= Charleston Gulls =

Charleston Seagulls / Sea Gulls / Gulls
- 1886–1919; (1886–1889, 1892–1894, 1898, 1904–1909, 1911, 1913–1917, 1919–1923); Charleston, South Carolina

Minor league affiliations
- Class: Independent (1886–1889, 1892); Class B (1893–1894, 1898); Class C (1904–1909, 1911, 1913–1917, 1919–1920); Class B (1921–1923)
- League: Southern League (1886–1889); South Atlantic League (1892); Southern League (1893–1894, 1898); South Atlantic League (1904–1909, 1911, 1913–1917, 1919–1923)

Major league affiliations
- Team: None

Minor league titles
- League titles (4): 1892; 1893; 1907; 1922
- Conference titles (3): 1914; 1917; 1923
- Wild card berths (0): None

Team data
- Name: Charleston Seagulls (1886–1889, 1893–1894); Charleston Sea Gulls (1892, 1904-1909, 1911, 1913–1917); Charleston Gulls (1919); Charleston Palmettos (1920); Charleston Pals (1922–1922)
- Ballpark: Ball Park Field (1886–1889, 1892–1894, 1898); Hampton Park/College Park (1904–1909, 1911, 1913–1917, 1919–1923)

The Charleston Gulls and the interchangeable Sea Gulls and Seagulls teams were a minor league baseball franchise based in Charleston, South Carolina from 1886 through 1923.

The 1886 Charleston Seagulls were the first minor league team in Charleston, playing as members of the Southern League between 1886 and 1898, with the 1892 Sea Gulls playing one season in the renamed South Atlantic League. Charleston teams then played as members of the South Atlantic League between 1904 and 1923. The 1904 Sea Gulls were charter members of the modern South Atlantic League.

The 1919 Charleston Gulls continued South Atlantic League membership, as the team became known as the Charleston Palmettos in 1920, followed by the shortened Palms who played in the league from 1921 to 1923. The early Charleston teams preceded today's Charleston RiverDogs in minor league play.

Besides their 1892 Southern League championship, Charleston teams captured South Atlantic League championships in 1893, 1907 and 1922. Charleston also won South Atlantic League regular season league pennants in 1914, 1917 and 1923.

Beginning in 1904, the Charleston teams hosted home minor league games at College Park, which lies within Hampton Park and is still in use today over a century later.

At age 22, Baseball Hall of Fame member Kiki Cuyler played for the 1922 Charleston Pals and joined the Pittsburgh Pirates at the end of the Charleston season.

== History ==
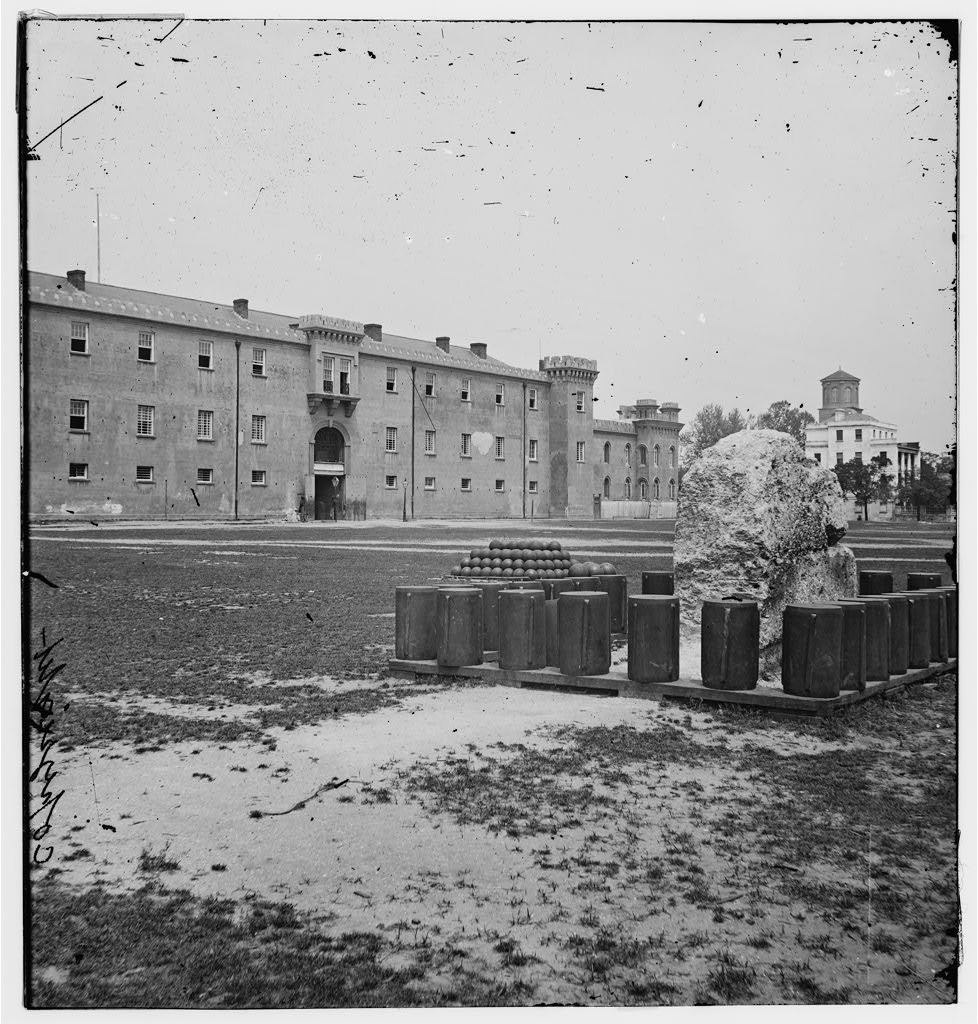
(1865) Citadel Green with the original Citadel building in the background. Charleston, South Carolina. Organized baseball was first played at the square in 1866.

Organized baseball play began in Charleston, South Carolina as early as 1866. In 1866, the "Palmetto Baseball Club" was formed in the city and the Palmetto team hosted their home baseball games at the Citadel Green, known today as the Marion Square.

The baseball site locale was first known as the Citadel Green as The Citadel Military College occupied the adjacent arsenal building from 1843 until 1922 when the Citadel physically relocated to a different location within Charleston. The Palmetto baseball team played their first home game at the Citadel Green on May 23, 1866.

On July 26, 1869, a riot occurred at the Marion Square site. The riot occurred after a baseball game between a Charleston team and a team from Savannah. The riot became known as the "1869 baseball riot."

=== 1886: First season / Southern League / Earthquake ===
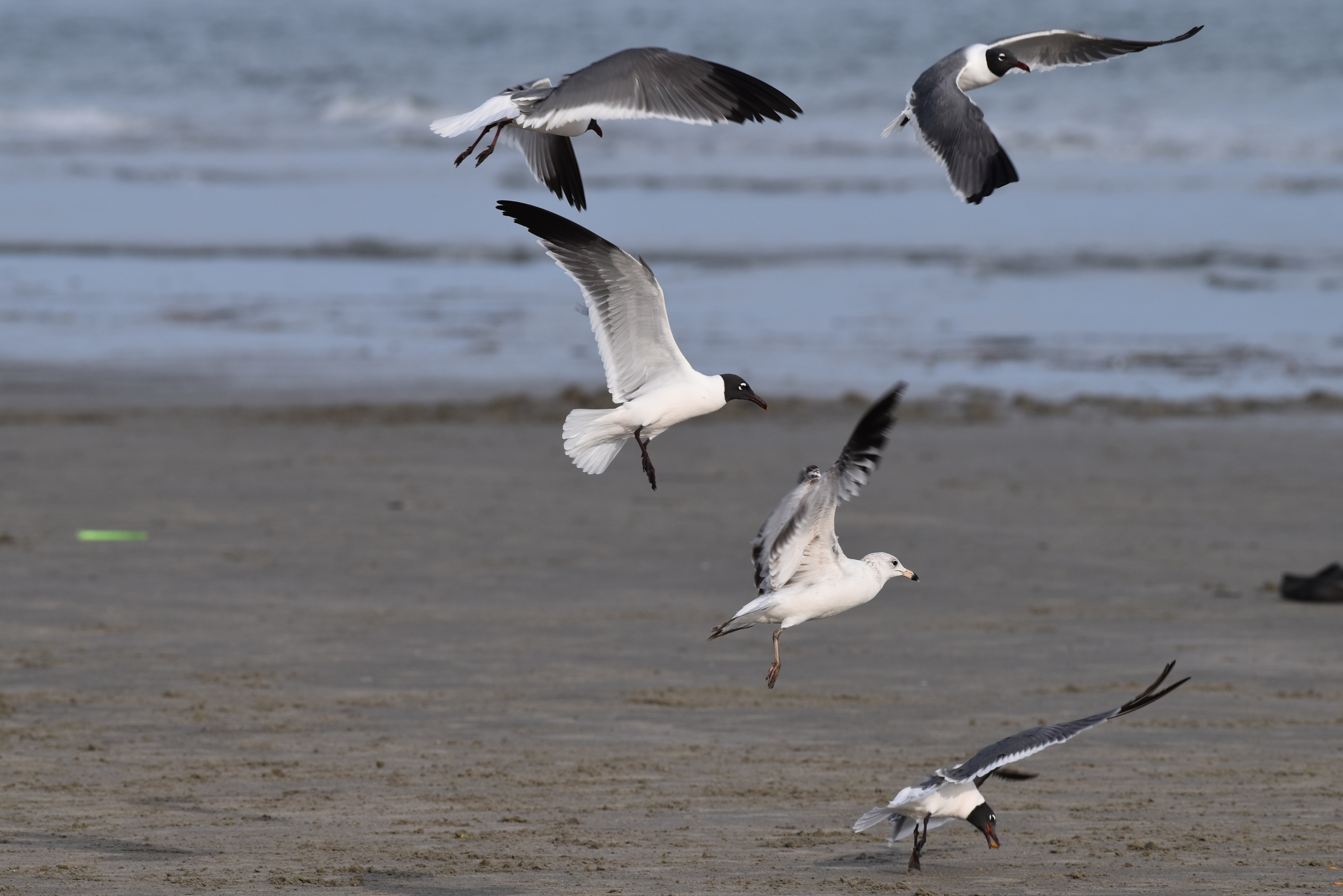
(2018) Four Laughing Gulls Leucophaeus atricilla and one immature Ring-billed Gull Larus delawarensis. Charleston, South Carolina.

Charleston began minor league play for the first time when the 1886 Charleston "Seagulls" were formed and became members of the Independent level Southern League. The Southern League began play on April 15, 1886, with Charleston joining the Atlanta Atlantas, Augusta Browns, Chattanooga Lookouts, Macon, Memphis Grays, Nashville Americans and Savannah teams as Southern League members.

The Seagulls, Gulls and related team nicknames reflect the local indigenous bird species of Charleston, which lies along the Atlantic Ocean. There are 13 types of gulls that are historically native to the Charleston area.

In the early baseball era, team nicknames were not official, and team nicknames were often created informally by local sportswriters or community leaders.

Charleston simultaneously hosted the Fulton Base Ball Club or Charleston Fultons in 1886. The Fultons played the season as a member of the ten-team Southern League of Colored Base Ballists league.

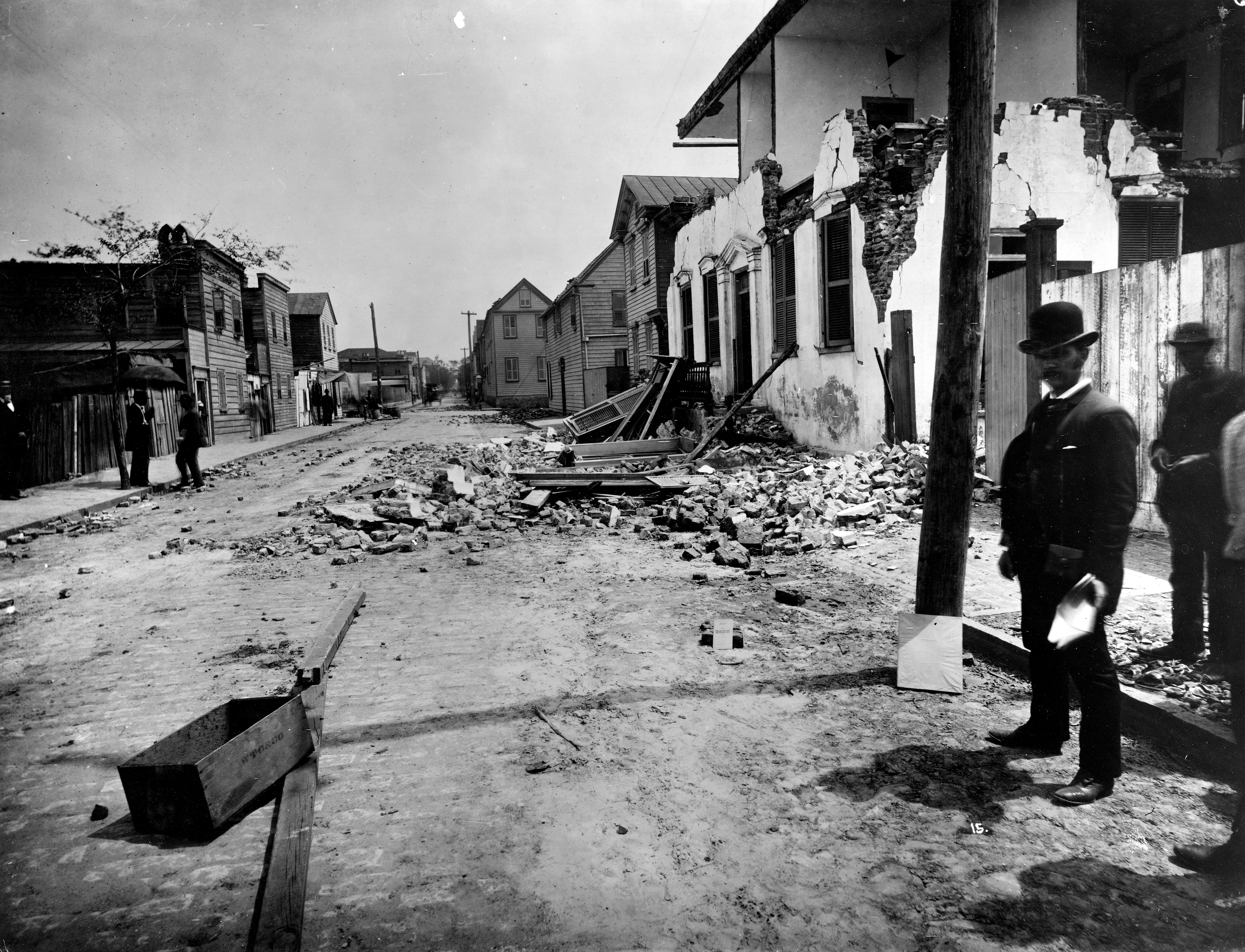
(1886) Tradd Street, Charleston, South Carolina. Damage from the 1886 Charleston earthquake.

The 1886 Southern League season was ended on September 4 because of the 1886 Charleston earthquake that struck the Charleston area on August 31, 1886, killing 60 people. In their first season of play Seagulls ended the 1886 season with a record of 44–49, placing fifth in the eight-team Southern League. Charleston played the season under managers Charlie Cushman and Jim Powell and finished 20.0 games behind the first place Atlanta Atlantas. Charlie Cushman was strictly a manager and not a player in his partial season tenure with Charleston. In replacing Cushman, Jim Powell began a three-season tenure as the Charleston player-manager. Jim Powell batted.240 with 33 stolen bases in 96 games for Charleston in his role as player-manager.

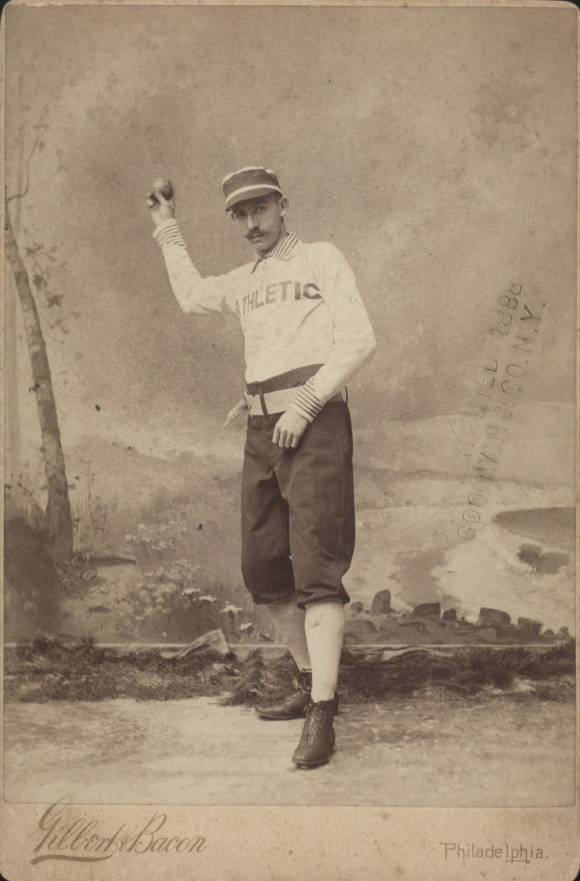
(1888) Gus Weyhing, Philadelphia Athletics. In 1886, Weyhing had 13 wins and a 0.76 ERA pitching 298 innings for Charleston at age 19. Weyhing won 262 major league games and hit a record 277 batters.

In his first professional season at age 19, pitcher Gus Weyhing played for Charleston in 1886. Weyhing compiled 13 wins and a 0.76 ERA, pitching in 32 games and throwing 298 total innings for the Seagulls. Following his strong showing with Charleston in 1886, Weyhing made his major league debut in 1887 with the Philadelphia Athletics, winning 26 games while pitching 466 total innings with 53 complete games in his rookie season for Philadelphia. In his 14-season major league career, Weyhing won 262 major league games with a 3.88 ERA, while pitching for 11 different teams. Weyhing still holds the major league record for most batters hit in a career, hitting 277 batters, the career leader by a large margin.

Outfielder Jimmy McAleer played for Charleston in 1886, batting.205 in 64 games at age 21. McAleer became a major league player, playing centerfield for the Cleveland Spiders (1889–1898), Cleveland Blues (1901) and St. Louis Browns (1902, 1907). He became a major league manager and served as manager of the Cleveland Blues (1901), St Louis Browns (1902–1909) and Washington Senators (1910–1911). He then became a co-owner of the Boston Red Sox from 1911 to 1913.

=== 1887 to 1889: Southern League ===
The Charleston Seagulls continued Southern League play in 1887 and ended the season in second place in the final standings of the eight-team league. The 1887 Charleson team was also known by the "Quakers" nickname. Charleston ended the season with a 65–38 record as Jim Powell returned for a second season as manager. No league playoffs were held, and Charleston finished 4.5 games behind the first place New Orleans Pelicans in the standings after four other league teams folded during the season. Serving as the player-manager, Jim Powell excelled as a player, batting.375 in 108 games.

Jim Powell began his third season as the Charleston manager in 1888 and the Southern League continued play as a four-team league. The league did not play the full season, folding before the season schedule was concluded. The league folded on July 8, 1888, with the Charleston Seagulls in fourth place. The Seagulls had a record of 20–28 as the league folded, finishing 9.0 games behind the first place Birmingham Maroons. Jim Powell was replaced as manager during the season by John Moran, in Moran's only documented season in baseball.

Despite folding the previous season, the seven-team Southern League returned to play in 1889 only to fold again during the season. On July 6, 1889, Charleston had compiled a 26–19 record and were in second place when the league folded. Managed by player-manager Jake Aydelott, Charleston finished 16.0 games behind the 45–9 New Orleans Pelicans. Charleston played some home games at Macon in 1889 after numerous league members folded and Charleston was renamed after the folded Atlanta team despite playing in Macon.

Player-manager Jake Aydelott had previously pitched briefly in the major leagues prior to his season with Charleston, logging 14 total appearances for the Indianapolis Hoosiers (1884) and Philadelphia Athletics (1886). Aydelott compiled a 1–4 record in 5 games pitching for Charleston at age 27.

Charleston native Pat Luby pitched for his hometown team in 1889. In his first professional season, Luby had a record of 9–5 with a 2.88 ERA pitching in 14 games at age 20. The next season, Luby made his major league debut with the Chicago Colts, winning 20 games as a rookie for Chicago. Having pitched 106 total games in the major leagues with the Colts (1890–1892) and the Louisville Colonels (1895), Luby died in Charleston of tuberculosis on April 24, 1899, at age 30.

=== 1892: South Atlantic League champions ===
In 1892, Charleston resumed minor league play as the Sea Gulls became charter members of the four-team South Atlantic League and won the league championship in a shortened season. The Winston Blue Sluggers, Columbia Senators and Charlotte Maroons teams joined the Charleston Sea Gulls in league play. The independent league played for six weeks before Winston folded causing the league to fold.

The South Atlantic League regular season schedule began on April 30, 1892. The league was short-lived and folded on June 10, 1892, after playing less than two months of the season. The Winston-Salem Blue Sluggers, who were in second place with an 18–14 record, folded, causing the league itself to fold with only three remaining teams. In the final standings, the Charleston Sea Gulls finished in first place with a 20–13 record, ending the shortened season 1.5 games ahead of second place Winston-Salem. Charleston was managed by "Passailaigue." A Charleston businessman, T.W. Passailaigue, was the superintendent of the Consolidated Company and owned the team.

Second baseman Tom Stouch played for Charleston in 1892. Competing in his first professional season at age 22, Stouch batted.261 on the season. After a brief major league career, Stouch became a long-time player-manager in the minor leagues. In 1907, while managing the Greenville Spinners, Stouch discovered Greenville native Shoeless Joe Jackson in an exhibition game and signed him to a contract with the Spinners, beginning Jackson's professional career.

=== Southern League: 1893 & 1894 ===
In 1893, the Charleston Seagulls rejoined the Class B level Southern League and won the league championship, playing in the 12-team league. The Atlanta Windjammers, Augusta Electricians, Birmingham Grays, Chattanooga Warriors, Macon Central City, Memphis Giants, Mobile Blackbirds, Montgomery Colts, Nashville Tigers, New Orleans Pelicans and Savannah Electrics teams joined with the Charleston Seagulls in beginning the league schedule on April 10, 1893.

On June 23, 1893, Charleston native Tom Colcolough pitched a no-hit game for the Seagulls. Pitching at home, Colcolough defeated Montgomery 7–0 in the contest. At age 22, Colcolough compiled a 16–11 record for Charleston on the season and pitched in the major leagues later in the 1893 season, making his major league debut with the Pittsburgh Pirates. He pitched in the majors with Pittsburgh (1893–1895) and the New York Giants (1899).

After beginning play, the 12-team league had numerous franchises in financial trouble and the league ended its season on August 12, 1893, with Charleston in first place in the overall standings. The league was also known as the interchangeable "Central Association." As the league folded, Charleston had a final record of 51–32, finishing the shortened season in first place, playing the season under player-manager Jack Carney. Charleston finished 2.0 games behind the second place Macon Central City team.

Jack Carney batted.308 for Charleston in 1893, playing first base and appearing in 85 games at age 26. Carney played in the early major leagues with the Washington Nationals (1889), Buffalo Bisons (1890), Cleveland Infants (1890), Cincinnati Kelly's Killers (1891) and Milwaukee Brewers (1891), batting.273 in 252 games. He later coached collegiately, serving as the baseball coach at both Boston University (1920) and Cornell University (1921–1924).

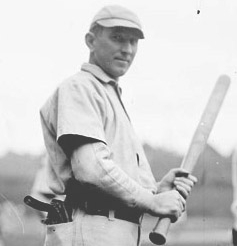
(1905) Jack McCarthy, Chicago Cubs McCarthy batted .310 playing for Charleston in 1893, before making his major league debut with the Cincinnati Reds at the end of the season.

Outfielder Jack McCarthy played for Charleston 1893, batting.310 in 85 games for the Seagulls. McCarthy made his major league debut with the Cincinnati Reds at the end of the 1893 season, following his stint with Charleston. In a lengthy major league career with the Cincinnati Reds (1893–1894), Pittsburgh Pirates (1898–1899), Chicago Orphans (1900), Cleveland Naps (1901–1903), Chicago Cubs (1903–1905) and Brooklyn Superbas (1906–1907), McCarthy appeared in 1,092 career games, batting.287 with a .365 OBP for his career. At the end of his major league, career, McCarthy had a then record 3,021 at-bats without a home run, hitting his last of his 8 career home runs during the 1899 season. Also during his career, in the 1904 season, McCarthy injured his ankle when he tripped over a broom used by the umpire to clean home plate. Afterwards, a rule was created, specifying that umpires clean home plate with a whisk broom and store it in their pocket. On April 26, 1905, while playing with the Chicago Cubs, McCarthy became the first outfielder to throw out three base runners at home plate in one game, achieving the feat in Chicago's game against the Pittsburgh Pirates.

Charleston returned to play in 1894 as the defending Southern League defending champions and were having a successful season when the Seagulls team folded. On June 27, 1884, Charleston had compiled a 33–22 record when they folded. Charleston played their partial season under the direction of player-manager Ollie Beard. As a player, Beard had a remarkable season for the Seagulls, batting .425 in his 1894 season (118–278) at age 32. An infielder, Beard had played in the major leagues prior to his season with Charleston. In his major league career, Beard batted .274 playing in 331 total games for the Cincinnati Reds (1889–1890) and Louisville Colonels (1891).

Pitcher George Blackburn played for Charleston in 1894 at age 24. In his brief major league career, Blackburn became a part of history in his only big-league season. On July 16, 1897, while pitching for the Baltimore Orioles against the Chicago Colts, today's Chicago Cubs, Blackburn surrendered a single to Chicago's Cap Anson, who became the first player in major league history to record 3,000 total hits with his hit off of Blackburn. Blackwell compiled a 13–9 record with 18 complete games for Charleston.

After folding in the 1894 season, the Charleston Seagulls did not return to the eight-team Southern League in 1895, replaced in the league membership by the Chattanooga Warriors.

=== 1898: Return to Southern League ===
After a four-year absence, the Charleston Seagulls returned to membership in the reformed eight-team Class B level Southern League in 1898. The league did not play in 1887 and formed in 1888 with the Atlanta Crackers, Augusta, Birmingham, Mobile Blackbirds, Montgomery Senators, New Orleans Pelicans and Savannah teams joining Charleston in the league. The Southern League began their league schedule on April 10, 1898.

However, the Southern League season was short lived, as the league folded on May 19, 1898. The Charleston Seagulls had a record of 20–10 on the day the league folded, finishing in second place behind first place Augusta (20–7). The second place Seagulls played their shortened season under manager Charles W. Boyer. Boyer later helped organize the South Atlantic League, serving as the league president from 1903 to 1908. In 1914 he became the founder and president of the Blue Ridge League.

After folding in 1898, the Southern League reformed in 1899 and played the season as a four-team league without Charleston as a member. The Mobile Blackbirds, Shreveport Tigers, New Orleans Pelicans and Montgomery Senators teams played in 1899, completing a 40-game season.

=== 1904: Charter members of South Atlantic League ===
After five seasons without a team, Charleston resumed minor league play in 1904 when the Charleston "Sea Gulls" became charter members of a new league. The South Atlantic League was founded in late 1903 by former Charleston manager Charles W. Boyer and J.B. Lucy as a six-team, Class C level minor league and the league began its first season of play in the spring of 1904. The South Atlantic League was nicknamed the SALLY League. The Augusta Tourists, Columbia Skyscrapers, Jacksonville Jays, Macon Highlanders and Savannah Pathfinders teams joined the Charleston Sea Gulls as charter members, beginning play in the new league on April 26, 1904.

The 1904 team was owned by Edward Ashenbach, who also served at Charleston's player-manager. Ashenbach, having helped develop the SALLY League, was nicknamed the "King of the Minors." In his minor league career as a player and manager from 1890 to 1911, Ashenbach claimed early discovery and development of Cy Young, Christy Mathewson, Ty Cobb, and Grover Alexander. In 1911 Ashenbach wrote a book titled "Humor among the Minors," which contains many stories from his lengthy baseball career. He died in February 1912 at age 40 from pneumonia while housed in a Cincinnati, Ohio mental hospital. Ashenbach came to Charleston after serving as the player-manager of the Evansville River Rats of the Central League in 1903.

To begin the 1904 South Atlantic League season, the Sea Gulls played against Ty Cobb in his first professional game for the Augusta Tourists against Charleston. Charleston ended the season in third place with a 59–50 record, finishing 6.5 games behind the first place Macon Highlanders in the final standings. Player-manager Edward Ashenbach managed the team for the entire season. Syd Smith of Charleston led the South Atlantic League with 137 total hits. Playing the outfield at age 32, Ashenbach batted .242 for Charleston, appearing in 52 games.

20-year-old catcher Syd Smith played Charleston in 1904, batting .282 while appearing in 118 games for the Sea Gulls. He returned to play for Charleston in 1905. Following his tenure with Charleston, Smith played in the major leagues with the Philadelphia Athletics (1908), St. Louis Browns (1908), Cleveland Naps (1910–1911) and Pittsburgh Pirates (1914–1915), batting .247 in 146 career major league games. Smith coached collegiately, remaining in Charleston and serving as the head football coach the first season of College football at The Citadel in 1905, following his second baseball season with the Sea Gulls. He later served as the head baseball coach at South Carolina in 1915.

=== 1905 to 1908: South Atlantic League ===
Sea Gulls team owner Ed Ashenbach returned to begin the 1905 season as the Charleson player-manager. During the 1904 season Ashenbach sold the Charleston franchise for a profit. Ashenbach then moved and became the manager of the Scranton Miners of the New York State League for the remainder of the 1904 season.

Continuing play in the six-team 1905 South Atlantic League, Charleston ended the season with a 53–70 record, having played the season under three different managers: Ashenbach, his replacement, Lee DeMontreville and finally Pat Tibald. No playoffs were held, as Charleston finished 23.5 games behind the first place Macon Brigands in the final standings of the Class C level league. An outfielder and shortstop, Lee DeMontreville had played in the major leagues in 1903 with the St. Louis Cardinals and batted .235 for Charleston in his last professional season at age 30. Playing third base, Pat Tibald batted .223 in 112 games and 403 at bats for Charleston.

At age 18, Ty Cobb of the Augusta Tourists led the 1905 South Atlantic League with a .326 batting average. Cobb joined the Detroit Tigers after the end of the South Atlantic League season.

Dan Lally played for Charleston in 1905, batting .185 in 42 games at age 37. Lally had played two season in the major leagues with the Pittsburgh Pirates (1891) and St. Louis Browns (1897), batting .267 with 3 home runs in 129 total games. Lally admittedly struggled with alcohol during his baseball career and was once fined $200 by the St. Louis Browns, after was reportedly drunk on the field during games in Brooklyn. Lally was often hospitalized in the final years of his life.

Charleston played the 1906 season under player-manager Robert Pender, who came to the Sea Gulls having managed the Baton Rouge Red Sticks for the previous three seasons, winning one Cotton States League championship. Pended had started his minor league playing career in 1886.

Continuing play in the Class C level South Atlantic League in 1906, Charleston ended the season placing fifth in the six-team league. With a final record of 48–61, Charleston ended the season 22.0 games behind the first place Savannah Indians in the final league standings as no playoff was held. Playing first base at age 39, player-manager Bob Pender batted .211 for the Sea Gulls in 109 games. Following the season, Pender left Charleston and became manager of the Norfolk Tars, where he led the Tars to the 1907 Virginia League championship. After serving as the player-manager the prior season, third baseman Pat Tibald remained with Charleston, where hd batted .170 with 15 stolen bases in 85 games and 305 at bats for Charleston at age 32.

Pitcher Roy Evans played for Charleston in 1906 at age 32. Prior to his season with the Sea Gulls, Evans had previously pitched in the major leagues. Evans won 29 games with a 3.66 ERA in 84 total major league games, appearing with the St. Louis Browns (1897), Louisville Colonels (1897), Washington Senators (1898–1899), New York Giants (1902), Brooklyn Superbas (1902–1903) and St. Louis Browns (1903). Following his baseball career, Evans was initially believed to have died in the 1915 Galveston Hurricane. However, in 1920 he was found and embroiled in legal troubles that saw him sentenced to prison for bigamy. Evans charged and convicted after he was evidently married to at least four different women simultaneously. He served less than two years in federal prison at Leavenworth before his release on June 22, 1922. His life after his release from prison is unknown.

==== 1907: South Atlantic League champions ====
Wilson Matthews became the Charleston manager in 1907 and would lead the team to a championship. Matthews came to Charleston in 1907 having managed in the 1906 South Atlantic League with the rival Savannah Indians. Matthews was strictly a manager and did not play for Charleston in beginning a three-season tenure as manager.

With Matthews beginning his tenure as manager, the Sea Gulls won the championship in the 1907 South Atlantic League season. The six-team South Atlantic League teams played a 130-game schedule, with the top team winning the championship as no playoffs were held. In winning the championship of the Class C level league, Charleston ended the season schedule with a record of 75–46, finishing a full 6.0 games ahead of the second place Jacksonville Jays, managed for the entire season by manager Wilson Matthews.

In 1907, Charleston's Tom Raftery won the South Atlantic League batting championship, hitting .301. In his third season with Charleston, Raftery played in 120 games and also led the South Atlantic League with both 128, hits (128), and 80 stolen bases. His 80 stolen bases were a South Atlantic League record at the time. In September 1907, Raftery was gifted a gold watch for being voted the team's most popular player. Raftery later played a partial season in the major leagues, appearing in 8 games for the 1909 Cleveland Naps.

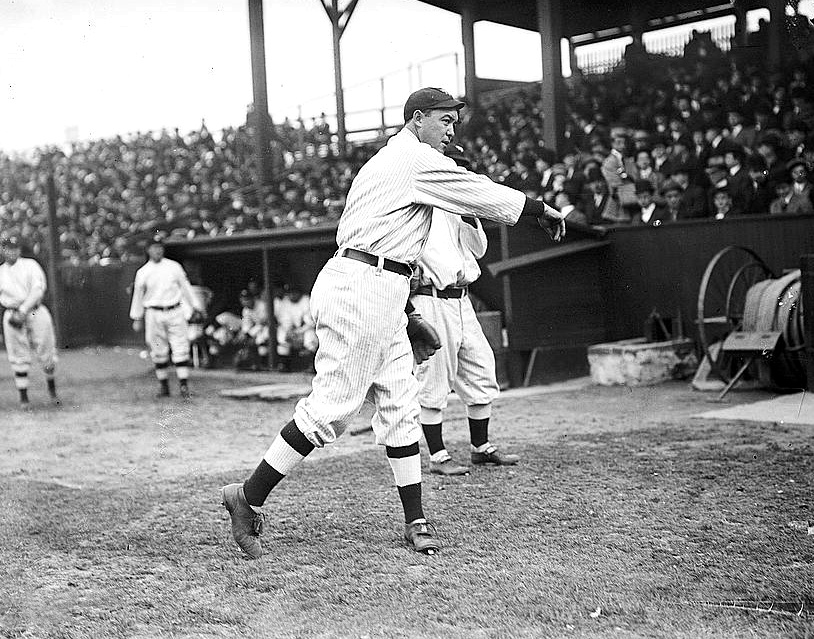
(1911) Bugs Raymond, New York Giants. Raymond won 35 games in 1907, helping Charleston to the league championship before embarking on his major league career to complete the 1907 season. Raymond had a troubled personal life and was murdered at age 30.

Charleston pitcher Bugs Raymond won 35 games in the 1907 minor league season, throwing 355 innings on the season in 51 pitching appearances. Raymond threw a no-hitter for Charleston at home on July 4, against Jacksonville, winning 4–0, with 1 walk and 8 strikeouts in the game. Raymond had previously pitched briefly in the major leagues for the 1904 Detroit Tigers. Following his 1907 season with Charleston, Raymond joined the St. Louis Cardinals for the end of the 1907 major league season, pitching in 8 games for St. Louis and finishing with a 1.67 ERA over 64 innings with 6 complete games. In his major league career, Raymond pitched for the Detroit Tigers (1904), St. Louis Cardinals (1907–1908) and New York Giants (1909–1911) with a lifetime 2.45 ERA and a 45–57 record. Reportedly, Raymond battled an alcohol problem that greatly affected his baseball career. In 1912, after playing with the Cincinnati Pippins of the United States League, Raymond was in a physical altercation in his native Chicago, Illinois. At Chicago's Hotel Valoy, Raymond's body was found and a subsequent autopsy revealed he was badly beaten with a baseball bat and died as the result of a fractured skull, his life ending at age 30. Fred Ciranz was arrested for the murder of Raymond, and he first admitted to Chicago police that he beat and kicked Raymond at a ballfield located at Elston Avenue and Lawrence Avenue. Before his death, Raymond told his brother that he had been hit in the head with a bat by Ciranz, which he later admitted. Raymond was first hospitalized following the incident and then released before collapsing and dying at the hotel after complaining of a headache.

As defending league champions, with manager Wilson Matthews returning, Charleston went from first place to finishing in last place in the six-team 1908 South Atlantic League final standings. The class C level league returned to a 120-game season, as the Jacksonville Jays won the league title by 12.0 games over the second place Savannah Indians, as Charleston ended the season with a 44–66 record. Playing again under manager Matthews, the Sea Gulls finished in sixth place in the six-team league. Charleston ended the season 32.5 games behind the first place Jacksonville in the final standings. As a team, the Sea Gulls batted .184 for the entire season with 262 total runs scored. Despite Charleston's last place finish, Sea Gull's manager Wilson Matthews was supported by the Charleston club owners and was highly sought after by numerous other minor league teams.

=== 1909 season: Charleston franchise relocated to Knoxville ===
The South Atlantic League expanded to an eight-team league in 1909, adding the Chattanooga Lookouts and Columbus Foxes teams to the Class C level league. On May 28, 1909, Charleston pitcher Pat Paige threw a no-hit game against the Macon, winning the game 2–0 with 1 base on balls. In his third season with Charleston at age 27, Paige compiled a 12–9 record with a 2.31 ERA in 1909. He later pitched briefly in the major leagues with the 1911 Cleveland Naps.

During the season, the Charleston team was taken over by the league at league meeting in July in which local reporters were "barred" from the meeting held in Augusta, Georgia. During the meeting it was decided that the Charleston franchise would be relocated to Knoxville, Tennessee and that the league would play a split-season, starting the standings over. Charleston was not represented at the meeting.

On July 5, 1909, the Charleston Sea Gulls relocated to Knoxville and continued South Atlantic League play as the Knoxville Appalachians. Managed by the returning Wilson Mathews to begin the season, it was noted that Charleston fans were saddened by Wilson's departure, as he was popular in the city. Wilson was succeeded by Steve Griffin after the team relocated, the team finished in fifth place. Charleston/Knoxville ended the regular season with a 52–61 overall record, finishing 28.5 games behind first place Chattanooga in the regular season standings. The Appalachians did not qualify for the post season final, where Chattanooga defeated the Augusta Tourists 4 games to 2. Griffin began the season with the Savannah Indians after having been the player-manager for the Portsmouth Truckers of the 1908 Virginia League in 1908. In 1909, Shoeless Joe Jackson of the Savannah Indians won the league batting title, hitting. 358.

In 1910, Charleston did not host minor league play and the Knoxville Appalachians left the South Atlantic League to become members of the newly formed Southeastern League. The 1910 South Atlantic League played as a six-team league, also without the Chattanooga Lookouts who became members of the Southern Association.

=== 1911: Ballpark destroyed / South Atlantic League ===
After the Charleston franchise did not return to play in the six-team, Class C level 1910 South Atlantic League, the Columbia Foxes won the league title.

Charleston rejoined the South Atlantic League in 1911. The Charleton franchise paid one-sixth of the $5,200 league treasury to rejoin the league. Ed Rasnick was named the Charleston manager for the team in 1911, having managed the Augusta team in 1907. He was hired by team owner Mr. L. W. Passailaigue, who was a local businessman, serving as the superintendent of the Consolidated Company.

The Charleston Sea Gulls returned to the South Atlantic League in 1911, as the league expanded from six teams to eight teams for the 1911 season, adding both Charleston and the Albany Babies teams to the Class C level league. The Charleson 1911 season was shortened when a hurricane hit the city from August 27 to August 29, damaging much of the city. Winds in the hurricane were at 106 mph and the storm lasted for 36 hours.

The South Atlantic League re-introduced the league schedule in which the winner of each half of the split season would compete in a playoff final to determine the league champion. On August 30, the Charleston Sea Gulls disbanded due to storms destroying Hampton Park Field. Charleston ended their shortened 1911 season with a record of 41–84 playing the season under managers Edward Ransick (through June 1), Kohly Miller (through June 12), Edward Sabrie (through June 25), James Durham (through July 28) and Charlie Luskey. The league schedule ended on September 8, 1911, and Charleston officially finished in last place in the eight-team league, ending the season 40.5 games behind the first place Columbus Foxes in the overall standings. The Columbus Foxes won the playoff over the Columbia Commies 4 games to 2, after Columbus won the first half pennant and Columbia won the second half pennant in the split season schedule.

Infielder Kohly Miller played for Charleston in his final season at age 38, having served as the player-manager for the Jacksonville Jays in 1910. Miller had briefly played in the major leagues in 1892 for both the Washington Senators and St. Louis Browns. He had a final three game stint with the 1897 Philadelphia Phillies. Miller batted .204 in his final season playing for Charleston.

Edward Sabrie played first base in 88 games and batted .264 for Charleston in 1911 at age 29. After his season with Charleston Sabrie played two seasons for the Pittsburgh Filipinos, who played in the 1912 United States Baseball League and 1913 Federal League. Sabrie returned to play for Charleston in both 1914 and 1915.

James Durham had pitched for the 1902 Chicago White Sox, appearing in three games with one win. Durham compiled a 3–7 record pitching for Charleston in 1911.

Playing in 100 games for Charleston at age 35, catcher Charlie Lusky was the final manager on the season and batted .216 in 320 at bats. Lusky had started 11 games in the major leagues for the 1901 Washington Senators in the first season of American League play.

After the destruction of their ballpark, Charleston did not return to the 1912 South Atlantic League. The South Atlantic League reduced from an eight-team league to a six-team league in 1912, dropping both Charleston and the Augusta Tourists. The Jacksonville Tarpons won the league championship in the Class C level league.

=== 1913: Return to South Atlantic League ===
After a one-season hiatus following the hurricane destruction of their home ballpark, Charleston again returned to South Atlantic League play in 1913. The Charleston Sea Gulls franchise replaced the Columbia Comers in the six-team Class C level league. With the league schedule starting on April 17, 1913, Charleston joined the Albany Babies, Columbus Foxes, Jacksonville Tarpons, Macon Peaches and Savannah Colts teams in the league.

George Needham became the 1913 Charleston player-manager after serving in the same role with the Guelph Maple Leafs of the Canadian League in 1912. The 1913 was Needham's final professional season at age 32.

At age 25, James "Jimmy" Hamilton became the Charleston player-manager during the 1913 season, following Needham. Hamilton would manage Charleston in four different seasons, leading the team to two championships in his tenure. Besides his time as a player, Hamilton managed 19 seasons in the minor leagues between 1912 and 1930. He managed the Traverse City Resorters of the Michigan State League in 1912 and had returned to the Resorters to begin the 1913 season before being replaced as manager and then joining Charleston.

The Sea Gulls ended the 1913 South Atlantic League season placing fifth in the six-team league. Charleston ended the season with a record of 48–68, playing the season under managers George Needham, Joe Kipp and James Hamilton. The Sea Gulls ended the season 30.0 games behind the first place Savannah Colts (78–38) in the final standings. No playoff was held as the Colts had the best record in the league in both halves of the split season schedule. Charleston player-manager George Needham played in 40 games as a second baseman, batting .194. Joe Kipp batted .216 in 92 games for Charleston, playing shortstop. At age 26, the 1913 season was Kipp's only career managerial role.

At age 20, Allen Sothoron played third base for Charleston in 1913, batting .205 in his tenure with the Sea Gulls. Sothoron left Charleston during the season and joined the Fall River Adopted Sons of the Class B level New England League, where he was turned into a pitcher. Making his major league debut as a pitcher in 1914, Sothoron went on to pitch 11 seasons in the major leagues with the St. Louis Browns (1914–1915, 1917–1921), Boston Red Sox (1921), Cleveland Indians (1921–1922) and St. Louis Cardinals (1924–1926). He had a lifetime 91–99 record, while appearing in 265 career games. As a player, he was a spitball pitcher. In 1919 Sothoron had compiled a 20–13 record with a 2.20 earned run average for the Cleveland when his pitch was banned following the season. After throwing the spitball was officially outlawed by major league baseball following the 1919 campaign, Sothoron at first was not permitted to throw it due to the rule change. Then in mid-1920s he was added to a list of 17 former spitball pitchers in the major leagues who were allowed to resume throwing the spitball. In 1933, following his playing career, and having served as a coach for the coached for the St. Louis Cardinals (1927), Boston Braves (1928), and St. Louis Browns beginning in 1929, Sothoron served briefly as the manager of the St. Louis Browns, with an 8-game interim tenure as a replacement for Bill Killefer before he was replaced by Baseball Hall of Fame member Rogers Hornsby.

After attending college, outfielder Earl Potteiger played for Charleston in 1913 in his first professional season, batting .194 for the Sea Gulls before being released. Potteiger had a lengthy career as a minor league player and manager through 1932. A multi-sport athlete, Potteiger also played in the National Football League. Potteiger was the player coach for the New York Giants in 1927 and 1928, leading the 1927 New York Giants to the NFL Championship as the head coach.

Pitcher Ed Foster returned to Charleston in 1913, having played for the team in 1906 and 1907. At age 28, Foster had a 16–19 record for the Sea Gulls and threw 313 innings while pitching in 37 games. Foster had pitched briefly in the major leagues for the 1908 Cleveland Naps, with a 1–0 record and 2.15 ERA with 2 saves, appearing in 6 games for the second place Clevland team.

=== 1914: South Atlantic League pennant ===
With Jimmy Hamilton returning as manager, the Charleston Sea Gulls won the league pennant in the 1914 South Atlantic League. The eight-team Class C level league played a split-season schedule and Charleston ended the season with an overall record of 78–46, which was the best overall record in the league. In the overall league standings, first place Charleston won the league pennant, finishing 5.0 games ahead of the second place Savannah Colts. However, despite finishing with the best record in the league, the Charleston Sea Gulls failed to qualify for the post-season as they did not finish in first place in either of the half season standings. The Savannah Colts won the first half pennant and the Albany Babies won the second half pennant before Savannah defeated Albany 4 games to 2 in the final.

During the 1914 season, Charleston pitcher Howard Cochran threw two separate no-hit games for the Sea Gulls. He threw his first no hitter on May 5, defeating Columbus 1–0 in a game held at Columbus. Cochran then defeated Jacksonville 5–0 in a home contest on July 11 for his second no-hitter of the season. During the season both Cochran (20–11) and his Charleston teammate Rube Eldridge (20–9) won 20 games for Charleston. Eldridge was aged 25 in 1914 and he went on to pitch in the minor leagues through the 1934 season when he was 45 years of age. Eldridge won 273 minor league games in his career, appearing in 573 games and pitching 4,164 innings.

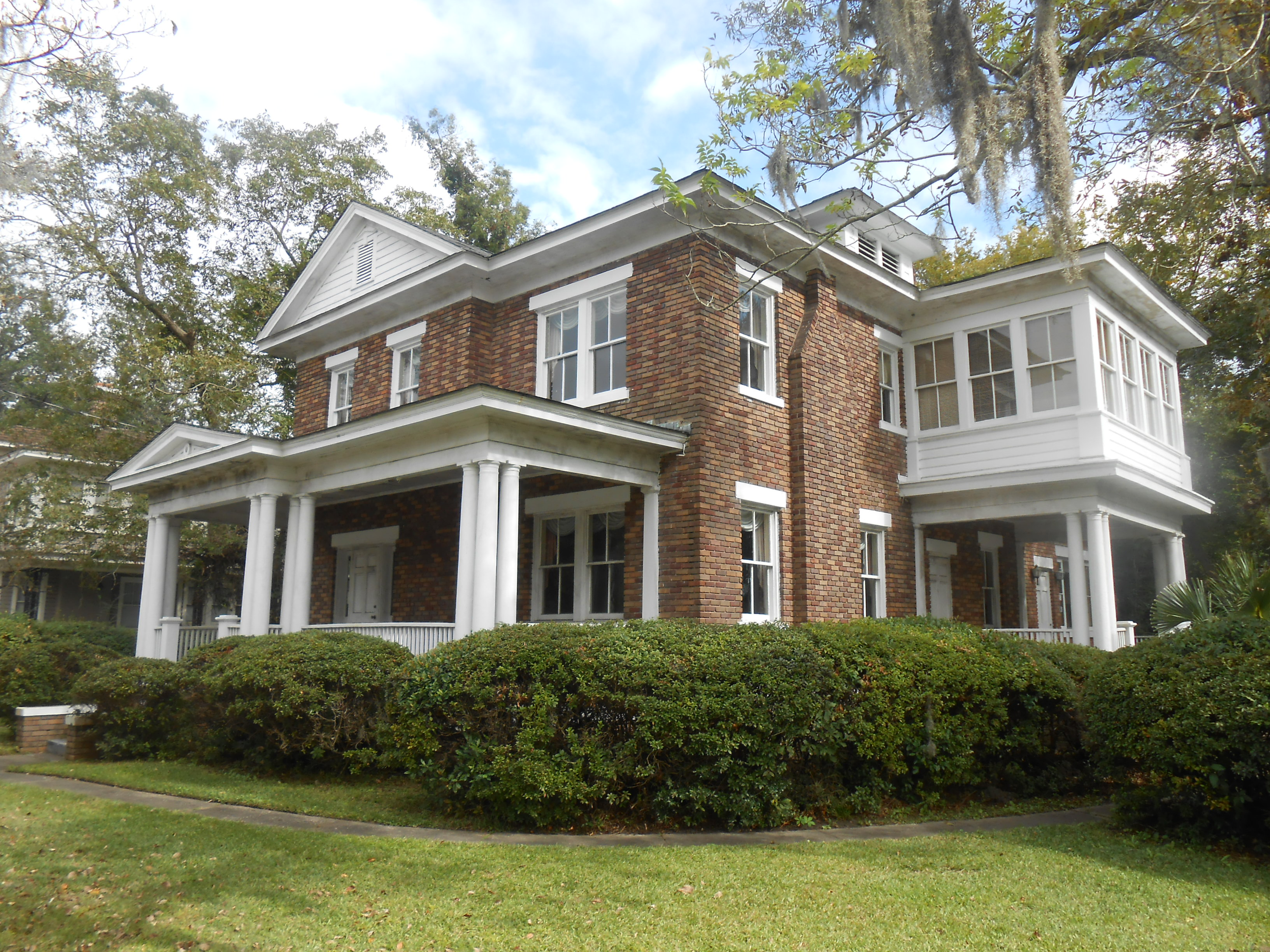
Thomas S. McMillan's former residence, 171 Moultrie Street, Charleston, South Carolina. National Register historic district.

Outfielder Thomas S. McMillan played for Charleston in 1913 and 1914, batting .248 while playing in 117 games for the Sea Gulls during their pennant winning season, which became his final season in professional baseball. McMillan also led the South Atlantic League with 46 stolen bases in 1914. McMillan had attended the University of South Carolina, graduating in 1912 and he was admitted to the Bar in 1913. McMillan began a law practice in Charleston in 1915. He then served in the South Carolina House of Representatives from 1917 to 1924, serving as speaker from 1923 to 1924. He was elected to the United States House of Representatives to represent the 1st congressional district in 1924 for the Sixty-ninth Congress. He was re-elected six more times and while in Congress was a member of the executive committee of the Inter-Parliamentary Union from 1937 to 1939. He was the head baseball coach at The Citadel from 1916 to 1919 in Charleston. McMillan and his wife built a residence in Charleston located at 171 Moultrie Street. Today, his house is a part of the Hampton Park Terrace National Register Historic District and serves as a faculty house for The Citadel.

=== 1915 to 1917: South Atlantic League ===
From 1915 to 1917, Charleston had success on the field, winning one South Atlantic League pennant with two second-place finishes.

Charleston continued play as the 1915 South Atlantic League played a split season schedule and in the midst of World War I, the league ended its season on July 20, 1915. The Sea Gulls ended the shortened season in second place in the overall standings Charleston had a record of 51–36, finishing in second place, while playing the season under managers Edward Reagan, Edward Sabrie and George Stinson. In the overall standings, Charleston finished just 0.5 game behind the first place Columbus Foxes (52–36) in the standings Charleston did not qualify for the playoff in the split season schedule, as the third place Macon Peaches won the first half title and Columbus won the second half pennant. The Foxes won their third South Atlantic League championship, defeating the Macon Peaches 4 games to 1 with the teams playing best of seven games in the final.

Infielder Ed Reagan came to Charleston in 1915 having been the player-manager for the Cordele Ramblers of the Georgia State League the prior two seasons. At age 30, Reagan played in 24 games for the Sea Gulls, batting .176. He finished the season as a player for the Griffin Lightfoots in the Georgia-Alabama League, before becoming Griffin's player-manager in 1916.

Playing first base in his only career player-manager role in 1915, Edward Sabrie batted .264 for Charleston in 89 games, at age 33. Outfielder George Stinson played for Charleston at age 38, batting .270 on the season, having begun the season as the player-manager of the league rival Macon Peaches, who won the first half pennant. Former Charleston pitcher Ed Foster replaced Stinson as the Macon player-manager.

Second basemen Harry Hartsell played for the Sea Gulls in 1915 at age 25, batting .310 for Charleston in 24 games before moving to play for the Fort Wayne Cubs of the Class B level Central League. In 1917, Hartsell began a tenure of collegiate coaching for North Carolina State University, that saw him coach baseball, basketball, and football through the 1923 seasons. He compiled coaching records of 16–18–4 as the head NC State Wolfpack football coach, 34–32 as the head NC State Wolfpack men's basketball coach, and 52–37–4 as the head NC State Wolfpack baseball coach. An alumnus of the university, Hartsell oversaw the entire athletic program and the school's "Wolfpack" nickname was begun during his tenure.

Jimmy Hamilton returned to manage the team, and the Charleston Sea Gulls were again the runner up, finishing in second place in the 1916 South Atlantic League standings. The South Atlantic League (SALLY) continued play as an eight-team, Class C level league. Despite their second-place finish, Charleston again missed the playoff in the split season schedule. The Sea Gulls ended the season with an overall record of 68–55, finishing in second place, playing the entire season under James Hamilton, as he returned to the franchise. Charleston ended the season 4.5 games behind the first place Columbia Comers in the overall season standings. In the spilt season schedule, third place Augusta won the first half title and Columbia won the second half title. In the playoff, the Augusta Tourists won their first South Atlantic League championship, sweeping the Columbia Comers 4 games to 0 in the final.

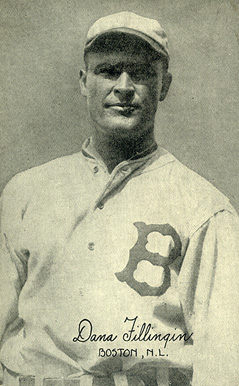
(1922) Dana Fillingim, Boston Braves. Fillingim compiled a 34–12 record in two seasons with Charleston, He threw a no-hitter pitching for Charleston in 1916.

Two Charleston pitchers threw no-hitters during the 1916 season. First, Dana Fillingim defeated Montgomery 5–1 in pitching his no-hit game on May 11 in the game at Charleston. Weeks later on June 5, Walter Norris defeated Macon 3–0 at home for his no-hitter. The 1916 season was Norris' only professional baseball season as he compiled an 11–11 record in 26 games. Fillingham had pitched with Charleston in 1915, compiling a 14–5 record before making his major league debut with the Philadelphia Athletics at the end of the season. Fillingim returned to Charleston in 1916 and had a 20–7 record with a 1.93 ERA while 242 innings in 33 games for the Sea Gulls, including his no-hitter. He later returned to the major leagues with the Boston Braves (1918–1923) and Philadelphia Phillies (1925). Finningim compiled a 47–73 career record, 10 saves, a 3.47 ERA in 200 career games with 59 career complete games and 57 games finished.

Pitcher Paul Des Jardien played for Charleston in 1916. A two-sport athlete, Des Jardien briefly pitched in the major leagues for the 1916 Cleveland Indians to begin the season before being acquired by Charleston later in the 1916 season, which became his only season of professional baseball. Des Jardien was with Cleveland to begin the season, and in June, he was sent by Cleveland to the Charleston Sea Gulls in exchange for the rights to Charleston pitcher Dana Fillingim. He debuted with the Gulls on June 16, in an 11–1 loss to the Jacksonville Tarpons. Shortly after, the Marshalltown Ansons obtained him from Charleston for $300.00. Following his only baseball season, he then played professional football for the football Cleveland Indians (1916), Hammond Pros (1919), Chicago Tigers (1920) and Minneapolis Marines (1922). Having played center in football for the University of Chicago, where the 1913 Chicago Maroons football team were National Champions, with Jardin named to the 1913 College Football All-America Team, Des Jardien was inducted into the College Football Hall of Fame in 1955.

In the era of World War I, the six-team South Atlantic League was one of just two Class C level leagues that played a season in 1917. Charleston won the league pennant in a shortened 1917 South Atlantic League season. On May 19, 1917, both the Columbus Foxes and Macon Tigers franchiseds folded, and the South Atlantic League continued play with the four remaining teams. Eventually, the league season was shortened to July 4 with approval from the National Association. Charleston ended the season with an overall record of 47–20, finishing in first place while playing the season manager Robert Crowell. In the standings, the Sea Gulls finished 7.5 games ahead of second place Columbia Comers. Playoffs were held as Charleston won the first half pennant and Columbia won the second half pennant after defeating Charleston 3 games to 0 to break a tie in the second half. After that series was held, both teams advanced to a final series, where Columbia beat Charleston. Columbia lost in the league finals as the Columbia Comers won their first South Atlantic League championship, defeating the Sea Gulls in 4 games to 2. Charleston's Howie Camp won the South Atlantic League batting title, hitting .357 on a league leading 105 hits. Charleston pitcher Johnny Meador won 13 games to lead the league.

Aaron Ward played for Charleston in 1917, batting .261 in 80 games while playing shortstop. At the end of the 1917 season, Ward made his major league debut with the New York Yankees. Playing as a starter on the infield, Ward remained with the Yankees through the 1926 season, playing in the lineup alongside Baseball Hall of Fame teammates Babe Ruth, Lou Gehrig, Tony Lazzeri, Earle Combs, Waite Hoyt, Herb Pennock in his tenure. Playing second base for the Yankees in three World Series from 1921 to 1923, Ward batted .286 with 3 home runs and 9 RBI in 19 world series games.

An infielder, Bob Crowell played in 76 games in his role as player-manager, batting .224 on the season at age 26. He played one more season in professional baseball.

The South Atlantic League did not play in 1918 due to World War I, as only 10 total minor leagues played a 1918 season in the United States.

=== 1919: South Atlantic League reforms ===
After a hiatus in 1918, the South Atlantic League reformed in 1919, following the conclusion of World War I. W. H. Walsh, who previously was the owner of the Charleston club for five seasons helped to organize the reformation of the league. Walsh was named as president, secretary and treasurer of the league, with Brian Bell of Columbia serving as vice-president.

The Charleston "Gulls" resumed play in 1919 as the South Atlantic League reformed as a six-team, Class C level league. After not playing in the 1918 season due to World War I, the league reformed. The league was also known in this incarnation as the interchangeable "South Atlantic Association." The Augusta Dollies, Charlotte Hornets, Columbia Comers, Greenville Spinners and Spartanburg Spartans teams joined with Charleston in resuming South Atlantic League play on May 19, 1919.

Before the season, it was reported that Charleston manager Jimmy Manes had assembled a roster of "experienced players."

The Gulls ended the 1919 South Atlantic League season with a final record of 49–48. Charleston finished in fourth place, playing under manager Jimmy Manes. No league playoff was held as Charleston ended the season 7.5 games behind the champion Columbia Comers in the final standings. Player-manager Jimmy Manes played first base in 88 games for Charleston batting .225 with 1 home run.

Pitcher Mutt Wilson played for the Gulls in 1919 and compiled a 19–11 record with a career-low 2.57 ERA for Charleston. Wison's teammate, Paul Johnson had a 16–11 record with a 1.93 ERA for Charleston.

A Charleston native, third baseman Fritz Von Kolnitz began a four-year tenure with the team in 1919, batting 273 on the season. Due to his Prussian-sounding surname, Von Kolnitz played under the name "R.H. Holmes" when first playing professional baseball in 1913, due to anti-German sentiment in the era. Von Kolnitz had previously played in the major league for the Cincinnati Reds (1914–1915) and the Chicago White Sox (1916), batting .212 in 115 career games.

=== 1920 & 1921: South Atlantic League ===
Charleston continued play in 1920 with a new nickname and a poor season on the field. For the first time, the minor league team was known by something other than a Gulls nickname.

In March 1920, pitcher Mutt Wilson re-signed with Charleston for the 1920 season. During the 1920 season, Wilson had a 15–17 record with a 2.78 ERA for Charleston and brought his win total to 34 in his two seasons pitching for Charleston. In July 1920, Wilson was purchased by the Detroit Tigers from Charleston with an agreement that he would report to the Tigers at the conclusion of Charleston's season. Wilson reported to the Tigers and appeared in three games for Detroit with a 1–1 win–loss record and an ERA of 3.46.

Charleston became the known as the "Palmettos" in 1920 and the team finished in last place in the South Atlantic League. The Palmettos ended the season record of 54–71, finishing in sixth place in the six team league. Charleston was often referred to as "The Palmetto City" in the era. Playing the season under managers Frank Matthews (25–41), Leo Townsend (3–7) and Ezra Midkiff (26–23), Charleston ended the season 24.5 games behind the first place Columbia Comers in the final standings. Pitcher Leo Townsend led the South Atlantic League with a 2.15 ERA after beginning the season as the player-manager. Like Mutt Wilson, Towsend ended the season with a major league team as he pitched in seven games with the Boston Braves at the end of the 1920 season. Townsend then pitched again for Charleston made one appearance with Boston in 1921 in the final season of his professional career at age 30.

Player-manager Ezra Midkiff had previously played as an outfielder in the major leagues for the Cincinnati Reds (1909) and the New York Highlanders/Yankees (1912–13), batting .207. In 1920, Midkiff played first base for Charleston and batted .240 in 46 games.

Third baseman Fritz Von Kolnitz also played 44 games at catcher for Charleston in 1920, batting .356 with 5 home runs for the season in 82 games and 292 at bats.

After pitching the 1919 season for a local team in Fredericktown, Missouri following a major league season in 1918, Tim McCabe joined Charleston in 1920. McCabe had played pitched for the St. Louis Browns from 1915 to 1918, compiling a 2.92 ERA and a 5–1 record in 22 major league games. In 1920, McCabe began the season with the Charleston Palmettos where he compiled a 2–3 record in 5 games. On June 15, 1920, McCabe was purchased from Charleston by the Rockford Rox of the Illinois–Indiana–Iowa League. The 1920 season was McCabe's final minor league season at age 25. Following his 1920 season with Charleston, McCabe played and managed independent teams in his native Missouri through the 1930s.

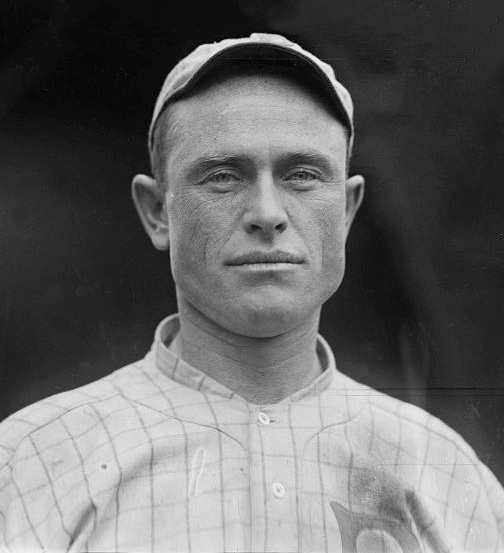
(1916) Larry Cheney, Brooklyn Robins. Cheney served as the Charleston player-manager in 1921, compiling a 19–5 record as a pitcher and leading the team to a second-place finish.

Charleston became known by another new nickname in 1921. The team became known by the "Pals" nickname, which was a shortened version of Palmettos. Charleston improved from their last place finish to become the runners up in the 1921 South Atlantic League, which became a Class B level league. Ezra Midkiff returned as player-manager to begin the season. The Pals ended the 1921 season with an 83–64 record, finishing in second place under managers Ezra Midkiff (23-23) and his replacement Larry Cheney (60–41). No South Atlantic League playoffs were held, and Charleston ended the season 11.5 games behind the first place Columbia Comers in the final standings. Charleston's Gus Felix led the league with 19 home runs and also had a league leading 44 doubles. Larry Cheney had a 19–5 record pitching for Charleston at age 35 and his partial season as manager for the Pals was his only managerial role. Chaney was previously a major league pitcher for the Chicago Cubs (1911–1915), Brooklyn Robins (1915–1919), Boston Braves (1919) and Philadelphia Phillies (1919) and was the NL wins leader in 1912 with 26 wins. Chaney had a career record of 116–100 with a 2.70 ERA in 313 career major league games.

Left-handed hitting outfielder Al Bridwell played for the Palms in 1921 in his final professional season at age 37, batting .286 in 93 games on the season. Bridwell had previously played 11 seasons in the major leagues with the Cincinnati Reds (1905), Boston Beaneaters (1906–1907), New York Giants (1908–1911), Boston Braves (1911–1912), Chicago Cubs (1913) and the Federal League's St. Louis Terriers (1914–1915). In his 1,252 career major league games played, Bridwell batted .255 with 1,064 total hits, 95 doubles, 32 triples, 2 home runs, 457 runs scored, 136 stolen bases and 350 RBIs in 4,196 at bats.

At age 28, Charleston native Fritz Von Kolnitz, batted .322 with 12 home runs for the season, playing third base for the Pals.

=== 1922 South Atlantic League champions ===
With a future Hall of Fame player on their roster, Charleston became the champions in the six-team, Class B level 1922 South Atlantic League as Jimmy Hamilton returned to rejoin the team as manager. The Pals ended the season with a record of 80–48, finishing the season schedule in first place, managed for the entire season by Hamilton. No playoffs were held, and Charleston was the league champion, ending the season 9.0 games ahead of the second place Charlotte Hornets in the final standings. Charleston pitcher Godfrey Brogan led the South Atlantic League with a 1.94 ERA and his teammate George Pipgras threw a league leading 260 innings pitched for the Pals.

Following his 1922 season with Charleston, George Pipgras went on to make his major league debut in 1923. He had a lengthy career, pitching for the New York Yankees (1923–1924, 1927–1933) and Boston Red Sox (1933–1935). Pipgras played on four Yankees World Series champion teams (1923, 1927, 1928, 1932) and was the AL wins leader in 1928. He compiled a 102–73 career record in the major leagues. Following his pitching career, Pipgras became a baseball umpire, working in the minor leagues before making his major league umpiring debut in 1938. He was nicknamed "The Danish Viking."

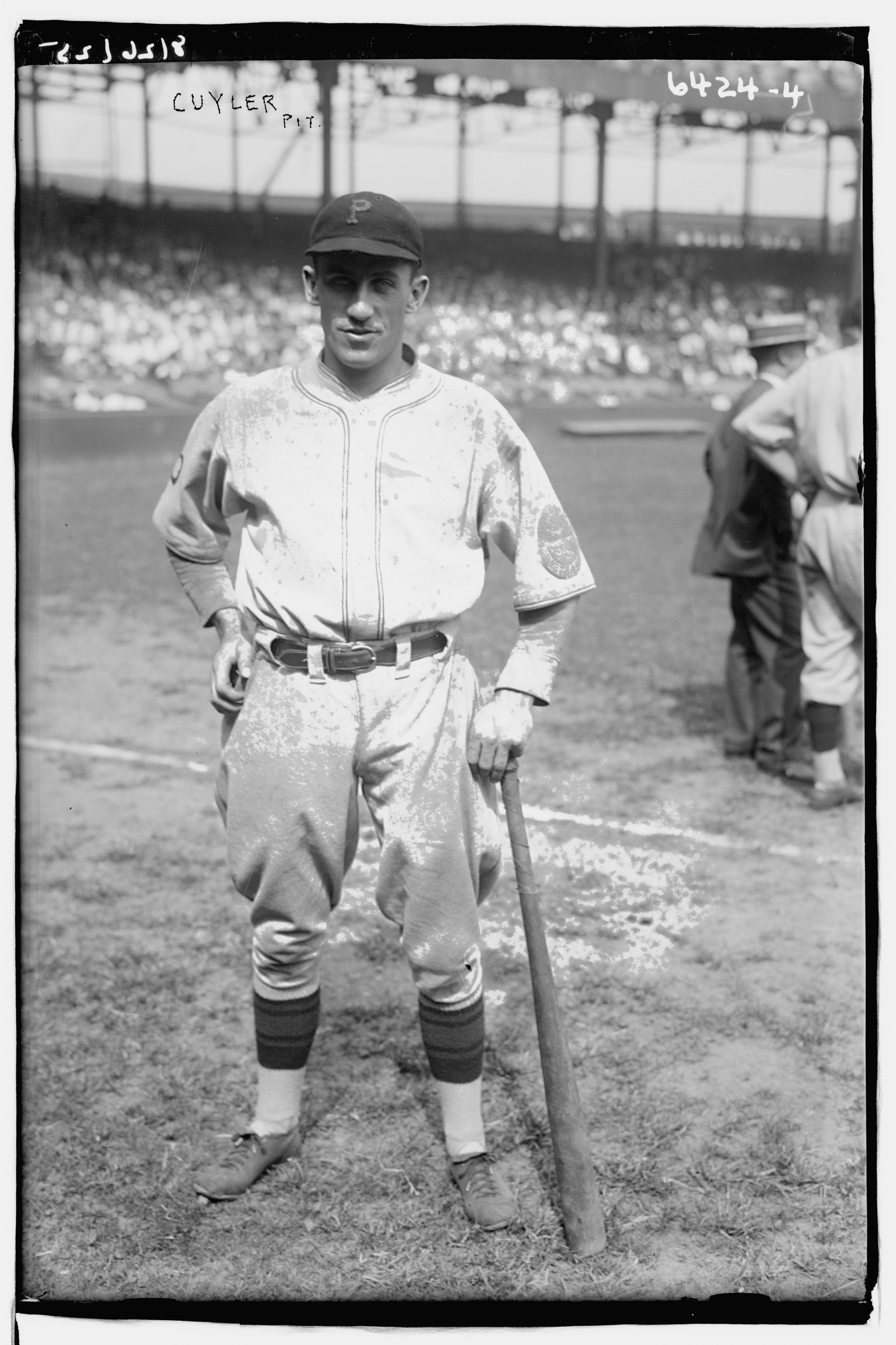
(1925) Baseball Hall of Fame member Kiki Cuyler, Pittsburgh Pirates. At age 22, Cuyler played for Charleston in 1922, joining Pittsburgh after the Pals' season concluded.

Baseball Hall of Fame member Kiki Cuyler played for the 1922 Charleston Pals at age 22. As an outfielder, Cuyler played in 131 games with Charleston, batting .309 with 12 home runs, 29 doubles and 12 triples on the season. Cuyler joined the Pittsburgh Pirates for a brief time following the end of the Charleston season, appearing in one game. In his 18-year major league career playing for the Pittsburgh Pirates (1921–1927), Chicago Cubs (1928–1935), Cincinnati Reds (1935–1937) and Brooklyn Dodgers (1938), Cuyler had a career batting average of .321 with a .389 OBP. Cuyler led the major leagues in stolen bases four times, and had the world series-winning hit in Game Seven of the 1925 World Series.

Lance Richbourg played 1B for Charleston in 1922 as a teammate of Cuyler, batting .286 in 90 games at age 24. Richbourg had played in 10 games with the Philadelphia Phillies at the end of the 1921 season. Richbourg would play in the major leagues with the Philadelphia Phillies (1921), Washington Senators (1924), Boston Braves (1927–1931) and Chicago Cubs (1932), batting .308 in 698 career games over eight seasons. In 1932, Richbourg and Cuyler were again teammates on the Chicago Cubs, who lost in the 1932 World Series to the New York Yankees with Babe Ruth and Lou Gehrig. In 1922, graduated from the University of Florida with a bachelor's degree and had played for the Florida Gators baseball team in 1919. Richbourg returned to Gainesville to coach the Florida Gators baseball team in the spring of 1922 (before joining Charleston) and 1923, and again in 1926. He compiled a win–loss record of 39–21 (.650) in his three seasons as the Florida Gators' head coach.

=== 1923: Relocation during South Atlantic League season ===
In defending their 1922 league championship, the Charleston Pals franchise relocated during the 1923 South Atlantic League season. To that point in the season, the Pals had compiled a record of 7–28 on May 28, 1923, when the team moved to Macon, Georgia and finished the season playing as the Macon Peaches. The team improved to a record 57-48 while based in Macon and made a late season run that included a playoff appearance. After starting poorly while based in Charleston, the Charleston/Macon team ended the Class B level South Atlantic League season with a final overall record of 64–76. The team played the entire season under manager Jack Coffey, who led the team while based in both locations. Charleston/Macon ended the season in fifth place in the six-team league in the overall standings, finishing 23.0 games behind the first place Charlotte Hornets in the final standings. However, with the South Atlantic League playing a split season schedule, Charlotte won the first half pennant and Macon won the second half pennant to qualify for the playoff. In the playoff, Charlotte defeated the Macon Peaches 4 games to 1 in the final series.

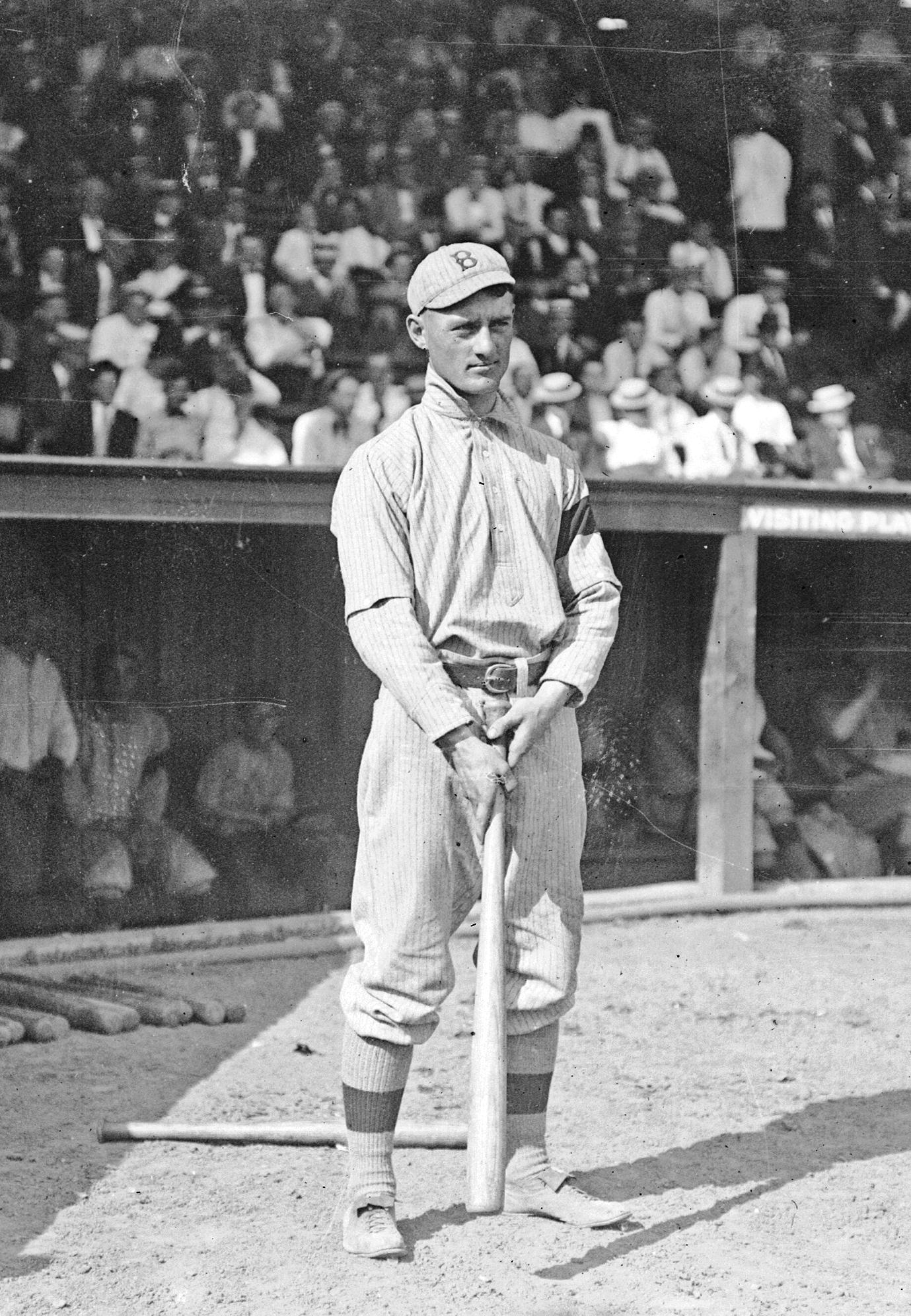
(1918) Jack Coffey, Boston Red Sox. Coffey was the player-manager for Charleston in 1923, leading the team to the playoff. He served as the Fordham Rams baseball coach and Fordham University athletic director from 1926 to 1958.

At age 36, the Charleston/Macon player-manager Jack Coffey batted .294 in 114 games playing the infield for Charleston. A long time minor league player from 1909 to 1924, Coffee played briefly in the major leagues with the Boston Doves (1909), Detroit Tigers (1918) and Boston Red Sox (1918), batting .188 in 110 total major league games. Following his playing career, Coffey became a successful collegiate coach and athletic administrator. Serving the school for over 20 years, Coffee is the namesake of Jack Coffey Field, which today is a multi-purpose stadium at Fordham University located in The Bronx, New York. The facility originally opened strictly for baseball in 1930, and in 1954 was the facility was named for Coffey, who had served as both the baseball coach and longtime athletic director at Fordham from 1926 to 1958. In his tenure leading the team, Coffey won 817 total games serving as the Fordham Rams baseball coach.

Following their move in 1923 to Macon, a Charleston team did not return to membership in the six-team 1924 South Atlantic League. The first place Augusta Tygers won the league championship and the Macon Peaches franchise continued their South Atlantic League membership, finishing in last place.

After a 16-season absence, Charleston next hosted minor league baseball in 1940 when the Charleston Rebels rejoined the South Atlantic League, beginning another tenue of Charleston's membership in the league that lasted through 2019.

Today, the Charleston RiverDogs continue minor league play in Charleston, playing as members of the Class A level Carolina League.

== The ballparks ==
The early Charleston minor league teams played home games at "Ball Park Field." The ballpark was located at the corner of Meeting Street and Shepherd Street in Charleston. The ballpark also hosted football games in the era.

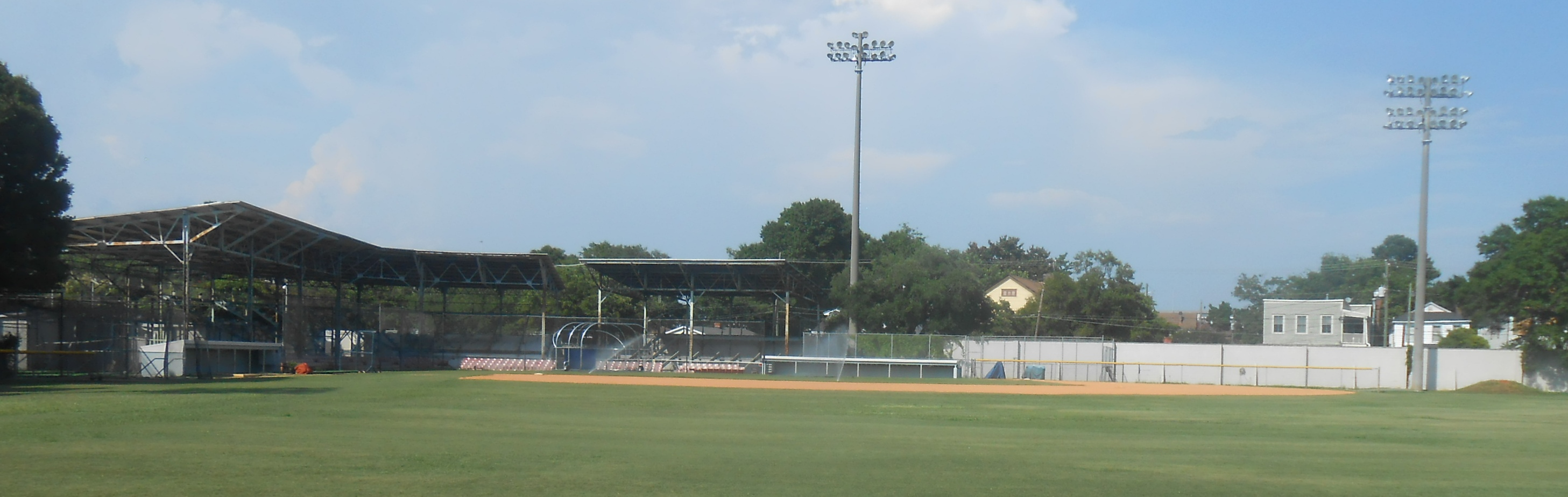
(2014) College Park, Charleston, South Carolina. The ballpark site hosted baseball teams beginning in 1904.

Beginning in 1904, Charleston began hosting minor league home games at the current College Park site. The site has been used as a collegiate athletic field since at least 1907, when the northeast section of Hampton Park was first leased by the City of Charleston to the College of Charleston for their use of the baseball field. The ballpark was called Hampton Park in the era. With its grandstand built at the stie in the 1940s the College Park ballpark is still in use today as a baseball practice field for The Citadel baseball team. College Park is located at 701 Rutledge Avenue in Charleston, situated between Grove Street & Cleveland Street.

Famed musician Elvis Presley played a concert at College Park on June 28, 1956, drawing a crowd of 4,000.

== Timeline ==
Year(s)	# Yrs.	Team	Level	League	Ballpark
1886–1889	4	Chaleston Seagulls	Independent	Southern League	Charleston Ball Park Field
1892	1	Chaleston Seagulls	Independent	South Atlantic League	Charleston Ball Park Field
1893–1894	2	Chaleston Seagulls	Class B	Southern League	Charleston Ball Park Field
1898	1	Chaleston Seagulls	Class B	Southern League	Charleston Ball Park Field
1904–1906	3	Charleston Sea Gulls	Class C	South Atlantic League	College Park
1907–1911	4	Charleston Sea Gulls	Class C	South Atlantic League	College Park
1913–1917	5	Charleston Sea Gulls	Class C	South Atlantic League	College Park
1919	1	Charleston Gulls	Class C	South Atlantic League	College Park
1920	1	Charleston Palmettos	Class C	South Atlantic League	College Park
1921–1923	3	Charleston Pals	Class B	South Atlantic League	College Park

== Year–by–year records ==
Year	Record	Finish	Manager	Playoffs/Notes
1886	44–49	5th	Charlie Cushman / Jim Powell	Season ended Sept 5 August 31 Charleston Earthquake
1887	65–38	2nd	Jim Powell	No playoffs held
1888	20–28	4th	Jim Powell / John Moran	League folded July 8
1889	26–19	2nd	Jake Aydelott	Charleston played home games at Macon; League folded July 6
1892	20–13	1st	T.W. Passailaigue	League folded June 10; League champions
1893	51–32	1st	Jack Carney	League champions
1894	33–22	NA	Ollie Beard	Team folded June 27
1898	20–10	2nd	Charles Boyer	League folded May 19
1904	59–50	3rd	Edward Ashenbach	No playoffs held
1905	53–70	5th	Edward Ashenbach / Lee DeMontreville; Pat Tibald	No playoffs held
1906	48–61	5th	Robert Pender	No playoffs held
1907	75–46	1st	Wilson Matthews	No playoffs held League champions
1908	44–66	6th	Wilson Matthews	No playoffs held
1909	52–61	5th	Wilson Matthews / Steve Griffin	No playoffs held Charleston moved to Knoxville July 5
1911	41–84	8th	Ed Ransick / Kohly Miller; Edward Sabrie / James Durham; Charlie Luskey	Team folded August 30 storm destroyed ballpark
1913	48–68	5th	George Needham / Joe Kipp; Jimmy Hamilton	No playoffs held
1914	78–46	1st	Jimmy Hamilton	Did not qualify Won league pennant
1915	51–36	2nd	Edward Reagan / Edward Sabrie; George Stinson	Did not qualify
1916	68–55	2nd	Jimmy Hamilton	Did not qualify
1917	47–20	1st	Bob Crowell	Won league pennant Lost in Finals
1919	49–48	4th	Jimmy Manes	No playoffs held
1920	54–71	6th	Frank Matthews (25–41) / Leo Townsend (3–7); Ezra Midkiff (26–23)	No playoffs held
1921	83–64	2nd	Ezra Midkiff (23-23) / Larry Cheney (60–41)	No playoffs held
1922	80–48	1st	Jimmy Hamilton	No playoffs held League champions
1923	64–76	5th	Jack Coffey	Charleston (7–28) moved to Macon May 28; Won second half pennant Lost in finals

== Notable alumni ==
- Kiki Cuyler (1922) Inducted Baseball Hall of Fame, 1968
- Spencer Abbott (1909)
- Varney Anderson (1894)
- Maurice Archdeacon (1919–1920)
- Jake Aydelott (1889, MGR)
- Bill Bankston (1915)
- Ollie Beard (1894, MGR)
- Rabbit Benton (1922)
- Elliot Bigelow (1923)
- George Blackburn (1894)
- Charlie Bohn (1888)
- Al Bridwell (1921)
- Howie Camp (1916–1917)
- Fred Carl (1887–1888)
- Jack Carney (1893, MGR)
- Larry Cheney (1921, MGR)
- Ed Clark (1886)
- Jack Coffey (1923, MGR)
- Ernie Cox (1915–1917)
- Tom Colcolough (1892–1893)
- Lem Cross (1893)
- Bill Crowley (1886)
- Jim Curtiss (1893)
- Charlie Cushman (1886, MGR)
- Paul Des Jardien (1916)
- Claud Derrick (1909)
- Lee DeMontreville (1905, MGR)
- Charles Doak (1916)
- Conny Doyle (1887)
- Jake Drauby (1887)
- James Durham (1911, MGR)
- Roy Evans (1906–1907)
- Gus Felix (1921)
- Jocko Fields (1894)
- Dana Fillingim (1915–1916)
- Pat Flaherty (1893)
- Ed Foster (1906–1907, 1913–1914)
- Gid Gardner (1886)
- Bill Geiss (1888)
- Bob Gilks (1909)
- Pit Gilman (1886)
- Tinsley Ginn (1915)
- Ed Glenn (outfielder) (1887–1888)
- Ed Glenn (shortstop) (1906)
- John Grady (1887)
- John Greenig (1886)
- Hal Haid (1917)
- Gil Hatfield (1893)
- Harry Hartsell (1915)
- Jack Heinzman (1889)
- Pete Henning (1921)
- Mike Hines (1886–1887)
- Shovel Hodge (1916–1917)
- Fred Hoffman (1913, 1917)
- Will Holland (1886)
- Charlie Hoover (1894)
- Sadie Houck (1888)
- Charlie Householder (1889)
- Mike Jacobs (1906)
- Otis Johnson (1907)
- Jim Jones (1898)
- Harry Kane (1909)
- Joe Kiefer (1922)
- Henry Killeen (1893)
- Billy Kinloch (1907)
- Rudy Kling (1898)
- Hi Ladd (1893)
- Grover Land (1922)
- Dan Lally (1905)
- Sam Langford (1923)
- Gene Lansing (1921)
- Sam LaRocque (1904)
- Harry LaRoss (1920)
- Bill Leard (1922)
- Hal Leathers (1923)
- Jim Long (1893)
- Pat Luby (1889)
- Con Lucid (1893)
- Charlie Luskey (1911, MGR)
- Vincent Maney (1913)
- Fred Mann (1888)
- Jimmy McAleer (1886)
- Tim McCabe (1920)
- Jack McCarthy (1893)
- Tom McCarthy (1908)
- Dan McFarlan (1894)
- Barney McLaughlin (1887)
- Thomas S. McMillan (1913–1914)
- Johnny Meador (1917)
- Lou Meyers (1888)
- Ezra Midkiff (1920–1921 MGR)
- Kohly Miller (1911, MGR)
- Willie Mills (1907)
- Walter Morris (1906, 1909)
- Red Munson (1905)
- Wilbur Murdoch (1905)
- Pat Newnam (1905)
- Joe Pate (1914)
- Elias Peak (1888)
- Pat Paige (1907–1909)
- George Payne (1913–1914)
- Robert Pender (1906, MGR)
- Marr Phillips (1886)
- George Pipgras (1922)
- Mark Polhemus (1894)
- Jim Poole (1917)
- Earl Potteiger (1913)
- Jim Powell (1886–1888, MGR)
- Tom Raftery (1905–1907)
- Bugs Raymond (1907)
- Jesse Reynolds (1904)
- Lance Richbourg (1922)
- John Richmond (1886)
- Jack Ridgway (1913)
- War Sanders (1911)
- Ralph Savidge (1905–1906)
- Lou Say (1886)
- Lou Schiappacasse (1907)
- Spike Shannon (1898)
- Allen Sothoron (1913)
- Fred Smith (1887)
- Syd Smith (1904–1905)
- Farmer Steelman (1898)
- Tom Stouch (1892)
- George Strief (1888)
- Con Strouthers (1886)
- Tony Suck (1887)
- Joe Sugden (1892–1893)
- Tom Sullivan (1886)
- Harry Swacina (1921)
- Monroe Swartz (1923)
- Billy Taylor (1887)
- Johnny Tillman (1917)
- Leo Townsend (1920, MGR; 1921)
- Tex Vache (1922)
- Fritz Von Kolnitz (1919–1921)
- Alex Voss (1888)
- Ernie Walker (1922–1923)
- Aaron Ward (1917)
- Piggy Ward (1905)
- Jack Wentz (1893–1894)
- Gus Weyhing (1886)
- Bobby Wheelock (1893)
- Mutt Wilson (1919–1920)
- Mellie Wolfgang (1920)
- Bill Wynne (1894)
- Fred Zahner (1894)

== See also ==
- Category:Charleston Gulls players
- Category:Charleston Sea Gulls players
- Category:Charleston Quakers players
- Category:Charleston Seagulls players
- Category:Charleston Palmettos players
- Category:Charleston Pals players
- Charleston (minor league baseball) players
