= 1914 South Atlantic League season =

- League: South Atlantic League
- Sport: Baseball
- Duration: April 9 – August 29
- Number of games: 130
- Number of teams: 8

Regular season
- League champions: Charleston Sea Gulls

Playoffs
- League champions: Savannah Colts
- Runners-up: Albany Babies

SAL seasons
- ← 1913 1915 →

The 1914 South Atlantic League was a Class C baseball season played between April 9 and August 29. Eight teams played a 130-game schedule, with the top team in each half of the season qualifying for the playoffs.

The Savannah Colts won the South Atlantic League championship, as they defeated the Albany Babies in the playoffs.

== Team changes ==
- The Augusta Tourists rejoin the league after they disbanded during the 1911 season.
- The Columbia Comers rejoin the league after a one-year absence.

== Teams ==
1914 South Atlantic League
Team	City	MLB Affiliate	Stadium
Albany Babies	Albany, Georgia	None	Albany Park
Augusta Tourists	Augusta, Georgia	None	Warren Park
Charleston Sea Gulls	Charleston, South Carolina	None	Hampton Park Field
Columbia Comers	Columbia, South Carolina	None	Comer Field
Columbus Foxes	Columbus, Georgia	None	Columbus Base Ball Grounds
Jacksonville Tarpons	Jacksonville, Florida	None	Dixieland Park
Macon Peaches	Macon, Georgia	None	Central City Park
Savannah Colts	Savannah, Georgia	None	Fairview Park

== Map of teams ==
South Atlantic League teams

== Regular season ==
=== Summary ===
- Despite finishing with the best record in the league, the Charleston Sea Gulls failed to qualify for the post-season as they did not finish in first place in either half of the season.

=== Standings ===
South Atlantic League
Team	Win	Loss	%	GB
Charleston Sea Gulls	78	46	.629	–
Savannah Colts	72	50	.590	5
Albany Babies	64	57	.529	12.5
Columbia Comers	60	66	.476	19
Jacksonville Tarpons	58	64	.475	19
Columbus Foxes	55	67	.451	22
Macon Peaches	52	68	.433	24
Augusta Tourists	52	73	.416	26.5

== League Leaders ==
=== Batting leaders ===
Stat	Player	Total
AVG	George Stinson, Macon Peaches	.322
H	Sam Mayer, Savannah Colts	162
R	Tim Bowden, Macon Peaches; Mike Handiboe, Savannah Colts	79
SB	Thomas S. McMillan, Charleston Sea Gulls	46

=== Pitching leaders ===
Stat	Player	Total
W	Joe Wiley, Albany Babies	24
IP	Joe Wiley, Albany Babies	357.0
SO	Phil Redding, Columbus Foxes	184

== Playoffs ==
- The Savannah Colts won their second consecutive South Atlantic League championship and third overall, defeating the Albany Babies in six games.

=== Playoff bracket ===
Finals
1	Savannah	4
2	Albany	2

== See also ==
- 1914 Major League Baseball season
