= 1913 South Atlantic League season =

- League: South Atlantic League
- Sport: Baseball
- Duration: April 17 – September 1
- Number of games: 120
- Number of teams: 6

Regular season
- League champions: Savannah Colts

Playoffs
- League champions: Savannah Colts

SAL seasons
- ← 1912 1914 →

The 1913 South Atlantic League was a Class C baseball season played between April 17 and September 1. Six teams played a 120-game schedule, with the top team in each half of the season qualifying for the playoffs.

The Savannah Colts won the South Atlantic League championship, as they finished in first place in both halves of the season.

== Team changes ==
- The Columbia Comers take a leave of absence from the league.
- The Charleston Sea Gulls rejoin the league after building a new stadium.
- The Savannah Indians are renamed to the Savannah Colts.

== Teams ==
1913 South Atlantic League
Team	City	MLB Affiliate	Stadium
Albany Babies	Albany, Georgia	None	Albany Park
Charleston Sea Gulls	Charleston, South Carolina	None	Hampton Park Field
Columbus Foxes	Columbus, Georgia	None	Columbus Base Ball Grounds
Jacksonville Tarpons	Jacksonville, Florida	None	Dixieland Park
Macon Peaches	Macon, Georgia	None	Central City Park
Savannah Colts	Savannah, Georgia	None	Fairview Park

== Map of teams ==
South Atlantic League teams

== Regular season ==
=== Summary ===
- The Savannah Colts finished with the best record in the regular season for the first time since 1906.

=== Standings ===
South Atlantic League
Team	Win	Loss	%	GB
Savannah Colts	78	38	.672	–
Columbus Foxes	60	55	.522	17½
Jacksonville Tarpons	60	58	.508	19
Macon Peaches	55	60	.478	22½
Charleston Sea Gulls	48	68	.414	30
Albany Babies	46	68	.404	31

== League Leaders ==
=== Batting leaders ===
Stat	Player	Total
AVG	Mike Handiboe, Savannah Colts	.314
H	Mike Handiboe, Savannah Colts	146

=== Pitching leaders ===
Stat	Player	Total
W	Dick Robertson, Savannah Colts	28
IP	Dick Robertson, Savannah Colts	331.2

== Playoffs ==
- The Savannah Colts won their second South Atlantic League championship.
- No playoffs were played as the Colts had the best record in the league in both halves of the season.

=== Playoff bracket ===
Finals
1	Savannah
2

== See also ==
- 1913 Major League Baseball season
