= 1915 South Atlantic League season =

- League: South Atlantic League
- Sport: Baseball
- Duration: April 12 – July 20
- Number of games: 90
- Number of teams: 8

Regular season
- League champions: Columbus Foxes

Playoffs
- League champions: Columbus Foxes
- Runners-up: Macon Peaches

SAL seasons
- ← 1914 1916 →

The 1915 South Atlantic League was a Class C baseball season played between April 12 and July 20. Eight teams played a 90-game schedule, with the top team in each half of the season qualifying for the playoffs.

The Columbus Foxes won the South Atlantic League championship, as they defeated the Macon Peaches in the playoffs.

== Teams ==
1915 South Atlantic League
Team	City	MLB Affiliate	Stadium
Albany Babies	Albany, Georgia	None	Albany Park
Augusta Tourists	Augusta, Georgia	None	Warren Park
Charleston Sea Gulls	Charleston, South Carolina	None	Hampton Park Field
Columbia Comers	Columbia, South Carolina	None	Comer Field
Columbus Foxes	Columbus, Georgia	None	Columbus Base Ball Grounds
Jacksonville Tarpons	Jacksonville, Florida	None	Dixieland Park
Macon Peaches	Macon, Georgia	None	Central City Park
Savannah Colts	Savannah, Georgia	None	Fairview Park

== Map of teams ==
South Atlantic League teams

== Regular season ==
=== Summary ===
- The Columbus Foxes finished with the best record during the season for the first time since 1910.

=== Standings ===
South Atlantic League
Team	Win	Loss	%	GB
Columbus Foxes	52	36	.591	–
Charleston Sea Gulls	51	36	.586	½
Macon Peaches	48	39	.552	3½
Columbia Comers	44	42	.512	7
Albany Babies	41	45	.477	10
Augusta Tourists	41	45	.477	10
Jacksonville Tarpons	35	51	.407	16
Savannah Colts	34	52	.395	17

== League Leaders ==
=== Batting leaders ===
Stat	Player	Total
AVG	Henry Chancey, Macon Peaches	.359
H	Henry Chancey, Macon Peaches	126

=== Pitching leaders ===
Stat	Player	Total
W	Phil Redding, Columbus Foxes	19
IP	Joe McManus, Augusta Tourists	274.1

== Playoffs ==
- The Columbus Foxes won their third South Atlantic League championship, defeating the Macon Peaches in five games.

=== Playoff bracket ===
Finals
1	Columbus	4
2	Macon	1

== See also ==
- 1915 Major League Baseball season
