= 1916 South Atlantic League season =

- League: South Atlantic League
- Sport: Baseball
- Duration: April 17 – September 4
- Number of games: 130
- Number of teams: 8

Regular season
- League champions: Columbia Comers

Playoffs
- League champions: Augusta Tourists
- Runners-up: Columbia Comers

SAL seasons
- ← 1915 1917 →

The 1916 South Atlantic League was a Class C baseball season played between April 17 and September 4. Eight teams played a 130-game schedule, with the top team in each half of the season qualifying for the playoffs.

The Augusta Tourists won the South Atlantic League championship, as they defeated the Columbia Comers in the playoffs.

== Team changes ==
- The Savannah Colts disband.
- The Montgomery Rebels join the league from the Southern Association.
- The Macon Peaches are renamed to the Macon Tigers.

== Teams ==
1916 South Atlantic League
Team	City	MLB Affiliate	Stadium
Albany Babies	Albany, Georgia	None	Albany Park
Augusta Tourists	Augusta, Georgia	None	Warren Park
Charleston Sea Gulls	Charleston, South Carolina	None	Hampton Park Field
Columbia Comers	Columbia, South Carolina	None	Comer Field
Columbus Foxes	Columbus, Georgia	None	Columbus Base Ball Grounds
Jacksonville Tarpons	Jacksonville, Florida	None	Dixieland Park
Macon Tigers	Macon, Georgia	None	Central City Park
Montgomery Rebels	Montgomery, Alabama	None	Montgomery Grounds

== Map of teams ==
South Atlantic League teams

== Regular season ==
=== Summary ===
- The Columbia Comers finish the season with the best record for the first time since 1911.
- On July 23, the Albany Babies and Montgomery Rebels disbanded.

=== Standings ===
South Atlantic League
Team	Win	Loss	%	GB
Columbia Comers	72	50	.590	–
Charleston Sea Gulls	68	55	.553	4½
Augusta Tourists	69	56	.552	4½
Columbus Foxes	62	62	.500	11
Montgomery Rebels	42	47	.472	14½
Jacksonville Tarpons	57	65	.467	15
Macon Tigers	55	67	.451	17
Albany Babies	30	53	.361	22½

== League Leaders ==
=== Batting leaders ===
Stat	Player	Total
AVG	Harry Purcell, Jacksonville Tarpons	.316
H	Bill Brazier, Augusta Tourists	150

=== Pitching leaders ===
Stat	Player	Total
W	Reid Zellars, Macon Tigers	22
IP	Reid Zellars, Macon Tigers	376.0

== Playoffs ==
- The Augusta Tourists won their first South Atlantic League championship, defeating the Columbia Comers in four games.

=== Playoff bracket ===
Finals
1	Columbia	0
2	Augusta	4

== See also ==
- 1916 Major League Baseball season
