= 1912 South Atlantic League season =

- League: South Atlantic League
- Sport: Baseball
- Duration: April 18 – September 2
- Number of games: 120
- Number of teams: 6

Regular season
- League champions: Jacksonville Tarpons

Playoffs
- League champions: Jacksonville Tarpons
- Runners-up: Columbus Foxes

SAL seasons
- ← 1911 1913 →

The 1912 South Atlantic League was a Class C baseball season played between April 18 and September 2. Six teams played a 120-game schedule, with the top team in each half of the season qualifying for the playoffs.

The Jacksonville Tarpons won the South Atlantic League championship, defeating the Columbus Foxes in the post-season.

== Team changes ==
- The Columbia Commies are renamed the Columbia Comers.

== Teams ==
1912 South Atlantic League
Team	City	MLB Affiliate	Stadium
Albany Babies	Albany, Georgia	None	Albany Park
Columbia Comers	Columbia, South Carolina	None	Comer Field
Columbus Foxes	Columbus, Georgia	None	Columbus Base Ball Grounds
Jacksonville Tarpons	Jacksonville, Florida	None	Dixieland Park
Macon Peaches	Macon, Georgia	None	Central City Park
Savannah Indians	Savannah, Georgia	None	Fairview Park

== Map of teams ==
South Atlantic League teams

== Regular season ==
=== Summary ===
- The Jacksonville Tarpons finished with the best record in the regular season for the first time since 1908, winning their second pennant in franchise history.

=== Standings ===
South Atlantic League
Team	Win	Loss	%	GB
Jacksonville Tarpons	70	41	.631	–
Savannah Indians	66	50	.569	6½
Columbus Foxes	61	51	.545	9½
Albany Babies	52	62	.456	19½
Macon Peaches	51	62	.451	20
Columbia Comers	41	75	.353	31½

== League Leaders ==
=== Batting leaders ===
Stat	Player	Total
AVG	Hardin Herndon, Albany Babies	.324
H	Red Massey, Savannah Indians	146
2B	Harry Matthews, Macon Peaches	25
3B	Sam Mayer, Savannah Indians	12
HR	Walton Cruise, Macon Peaches	8

=== Pitching leaders ===
Stat	Player	Total
W	Al Schulz, Savannah Indians	25
IP	Al Schulz, Savannah Indians	371.1

== Playoffs ==
- The Jacksonville Tarpons won their second South Atlantic League championship, defeating the Columbus Foxes in five games.

=== Playoff bracket ===
Finals
1	Jacksonville	4
2	Columbus	1

== See also ==
- 1912 Major League Baseball season
