= 1911 South Atlantic League season =

- League: South Atlantic League
- Sport: Baseball
- Duration: April 9 – September 9
- Number of games: 140
- Number of teams: 8

Regular season
- League champions: Columbia Commies

Playoffs
- League champions: Columbus Foxes
- Runners-up: Columbia Commies

SAL seasons
- ← 1910 1912 →

The 1911 South Atlantic League was a Class C baseball season played between April 9 and September 9. Eight teams played a 140-game schedule, with the top team in each half of the season qualifying for the playoffs.

The Columbus Foxes won the South Atlantic League championship, defeating the Columbia Commies in the post-season.

== League changes ==
- The South Atlantic League re-introduced a playoff system in which the winner of each half of the season would compete in the playoffs to determine the champion of the league.

== Team changes ==
- The Albany Babies joined the league as an expansion team.
- The Charleston Sea Gulls re-joined the league after the club moved to Knoxville, Tennessee during the 1909 season.
- The Columbia Gamecocks are renamed the Columbia Commies.
- The Jacksonville Jays are renamed the Jacksonville Tarpons.

== Teams ==
1911 South Atlantic League
Team	City	MLB Affiliate	Stadium
Albany Babies	Albany, Georgia	None	Albany Park
Augusta Tourists; South Atlantic League Orphans	Augusta, Georgia; None	None	Warren Park; None
Charleston Sea Gulls	Charleston, South Carolina	None	Hampton Park Field
Columbia Commies	Columbia, South Carolina	None	Comer Field
Columbus Foxes	Columbus, Georgia	None	Columbus Base Ball Grounds
Jacksonville Tarpons	Jacksonville, Florida	None	Dixieland Park
Macon Peaches	Macon, Georgia	None	Central City Park
Savannah Indians	Savannah, Georgia	None	Fairview Park

== Map of teams ==
South Atlantic League teams

== Regular season ==
=== Summary ===
- The Columbia Commies finished with the best record in the regular season, winning their first South Atlantic League regular season pennant.
- On July 26, the Augusta Tourists franchise was forfeited, but the club operated the club as the South Atlantic League Orphans until the team was disbanded on August 30.
- On August 30, the Charleston Sea Gulls disbanded due to storms destroying Hampton Park Field.

=== Standings ===
South Atlantic League
Team	Win	Loss	%	GB
Columbia Commies	87	49	.640	–
Columbus Foxes	86	50	.632	1
Albany Babies	82	53	.607	4½
Macon Peaches	72	62	.537	14
Jacksonville Tarpons	56	79	.415	30½
Augusta Tourists / South Atlantic League Orphans	52	74	.413	30
Savannah Indians	56	81	.409	31½
Charleston Sea Gulls	41	84	.328	40½

== League Leaders ==
=== Batting leaders ===
Stat	Player	Total
AVG	Scotty Alcock, Albany Babies	.333
H	Scotty Alcock, Albany Babies	178

=== Pitching leaders ===
Stat	Player	Total
W	Phil Douglas, Macon Peaches	28

== Playoffs ==
- The playoff round to determine the champion was a best-of-seven series.
- The Columbus Foxes won their second South Atlantic League championship, defeating the Columbia Commies in six games.

=== Playoff bracket ===
Finals
1	Columbia	2
2	Columbus	4

== See also ==
- 1911 Major League Baseball season
