= 1909 South Atlantic League season =

- League: South Atlantic League
- Sport: Baseball
- Duration: April 15 – September 7
- Number of games: 130
- Number of teams: 8

Regular season
- League champions: Chattanooga Lookouts

Playoffs
- League champions: Chattanooga Lookouts
- Runners-up: Augusta Tourists

SAL seasons
- ← 1908 1910 →

The 1909 South Atlantic League was a Class C baseball season played between April 15 and September 7. Eight teams played a 130-game schedule, with the top team winning the pennant.

The Chattanooga Lookouts won the South Atlantic League championship, defeating the Augusta Tourists in the post-season.

== League changes ==
- The South Atlantic League introduced a playoff system, the winner of each half of the season would compete in the playoffs to determine the champion of the league.

== Team changes ==
- The Chattanooga Lookouts join the league as an expansion team.
- The Columbus Foxes join the league as an expansion team.

== Teams ==
1909 South Atlantic League
| Team | City | MLB Affiliate | Stadium |
| Augusta Tourists | Augusta, Georgia | None | Warren Park |
| Charleston Sea Gulls; Knoxville Appalachians | Charleston, South Carolina; Knoxville, Tennessee | None | Hampton Park Field; Chilhowee Park |
| Chattanooga Lookouts | Chattanooga, Tennessee | None | Chamberlain Field |
| Columbia Gamecocks | Columbia, South Carolina | None | Comer Field |
| Columbus Foxes | Columbus, Georgia | None | Columbus Base Ball Grounds |
| Jacksonville Jays | Jacksonville, Florida | None | Dixieland Park |
| Macon Peaches | Macon, Georgia | None | Central City Park |
| Savannah Indians | Savannah, Georgia | None | Bolton Street Park |

== Map of teams ==
South Atlantic League teams

== Regular season ==
=== Summary ===
- On July 5, the Charleston Sea Gulls relocated to Knoxville, Tennessee, and were renamed the Knoxville Appalachians.
- The Chattanooga Lookouts finished with the best record in the regular season, winning their first South Atlantic League pennant.
- The Chattanooga Lookouts finished the first half of the season with the best record in the league, while the Augusta Tourists had the best record in the second half of the season.

=== Standings ===
South Atlantic League
| Team | Win | Loss | % | GB |
|---|---|---|---|---|
| Chattanooga Lookouts | 84 | 36 | .700 | – |
| Columbus Foxes | 73 | 50 | .593 | 12½ |
| Augusta Tourists | 65 | 48 | .575 | 15½ |
| Savannah Indians | 60 | 61 | .496 | 24½ |
| Charleston Sea Gulls / Knoxville Appalachians | 52 | 61 | .460 | 28½ |
| Macon Peaches | 50 | 68 | .424 | 33 |
| Jacksonville Jays | 47 | 70 | .402 | 35½ |
| Columbia Gamecocks | 41 | 78 | .345 | 42½ |

== League Leaders ==
=== Batting leaders ===
| Stat | Player | Total |
|---|---|---|
| AVG | Shoeless Joe Jackson, Savannah Indians | .358 |
| H | Wheeler Johnson, Chattanooga Lookouts | 166 |

=== Pitching leaders ===
| Stat | Player | Total |
|---|---|---|
| W | Roy Radebaugh, Columbus Foxes | 25 |

== Playoffs ==
- The playoff round to determine the champion was a best-of-seven series.
- The Chattanooga Lookouts won their second South Atlantic League championship, defeating the Augusta Tourists in seven games.

=== Playoff bracket ===
| Finals |
| 1 | Chattanooga | 4 |
| 2 | Augusta | 3 |

== See also ==
- 1909 Major League Baseball season
