= 1910 South Atlantic League season =

- League: South Atlantic League
- Sport: Baseball
- Duration: April 11 – August 27
- Number of games: 120
- Number of teams: 6

Regular season
- League champions: Columbus Foxes

SAL seasons
- ← 1909 1911 →

The 1910 South Atlantic League was a Class C baseball season played between April 11 and August 27. Six teams played a 120-game schedule, with the top team winning the pennant.

The Columbus Foxes won the South Atlantic League pennant, finishing in first place in the standings.

== Team changes ==
- The Chattanooga Lookouts left the league and joined the Southern Association.
- The Knoxville Appalachians left the league and joined the Southeastern League.

== Teams ==
1910 South Atlantic League
Team	City	MLB Affiliate	Stadium
Augusta Tourists	Augusta, Georgia	None	Warren Park
Columbia Gamecocks	Columbia, South Carolina	None	Comer Field
Columbus Foxes	Columbus, Georgia	None	Columbus Base Ball Grounds
Jacksonville Jays	Jacksonville, Florida	None	Dixieland Park
Macon Peaches	Macon, Georgia	None	Central City Park
Savannah Indians	Savannah, Georgia	None	Fairview Park

== Map of teams ==
South Atlantic League teams

== Regular season ==
=== Summary ===
- The Columbus Foxes finished with the best record in the regular season, winning their first South Atlantic League pennant.

=== Standings ===
South Atlantic League
Team	Win	Loss	%	GB
Columbus Foxes	70	49	.588	–
Macon Peaches	68	50	.576	1½
Jacksonville Jays	60	58	.508	9½
Savannah Indians	61	59	.508	9½
Augusta Tourists	51	68	.429	19
Columbia Gamecocks	46	72	.390	23½

== League Leaders ==
=== Batting leaders ===
Stat	Player	Total
AVG	Juan Violá, Augusta Tourists	.305
H	Al Lee, Macon Peaches	128

=== Pitching leaders ===
Stat	Player	Total
W	Sam Weems, Macon Peaches	25

== See also ==
- 1910 Major League Baseball season
