= 1904 South Atlantic League season =

- League: South Atlantic League
- Sport: Baseball
- Duration: April 26 – September 10
- Number of games: 120
- Number of teams: 6

Regular season
- League champions: Macon Highlanders

SAL seasons
- 1905 →

The 1904 South Atlantic League was a Class C baseball season played between April 26 and September 10. Six teams played a 120-game schedule, with the top team winning the pennant.

The Macon Highlanders won the South Atlantic League championship, as they finished the regular season in first place.

== Formation of league ==
The South Atlantic League was established in 1903 by Charles W. Boyer and J.B. Lucy as a Class C league in the Southeastern United States. The first season played was in 1904.

== Teams ==
1904 South Atlantic League
Team	City	MLB Affiliate	Stadium
Augusta Tourists	Augusta, Georgia	None	Warren Park
Charleston Sea Gulls	Charleston, South Carolina	None	Ball Park Field
Columbia Skyscrapers	Columbia, South Carolina	None	Comer Field
Jacksonville Jays	Jacksonville, Florida	None	Dixieland Park
Macon Highlanders	Macon, Georgia	None	Central City Park
Savannah Pathfinders	Savannah, Georgia	None	Bolton Street Park

== Map of teams ==
South Atlantic League teams

== Regular season ==
=== Summary ===
- The Macon Highlanders finished with the best record in the regular season in the first season of the league, winning the South Atlantic League pennant.

=== Standings ===
South Atlantic League
Team	Win	Loss	%	GB
Macon Highlanders	67	45	.598	–
Savannah Pathfinders	63	48	.568	3½
Charleston Sea Gulls	59	50	.541	6½
Jacksonville Jays	58	57	.504	10½
Columbia Skyscrapers	47	62	.431	18½
Augusta Tourists	41	73	.360	27

== League Leaders ==
=== Batting leaders ===
Stat	Player	Total
AVG	Billy Oyler, Savannah Pathfinders	.302
H	Syd Smith, Charleston Sea Gulls	137

=== Pitching leaders ===
Stat	Player	Total
W	Alvin Bayne, Macon Highlanders	30

== See also ==
- 1904 Major League Baseball season
