= 1906 South Atlantic League season =

- League: South Atlantic League
- Sport: Baseball
- Duration: April 16 – September 3
- Number of games: 120
- Number of teams: 6

Regular season
- League champions: Savannah Indians

SAL seasons
- ← 1905 1907 →

The 1906 South Atlantic League was a Class C baseball season played between April 16 and September 3. Six teams played a 120-game schedule, with the top team winning the pennant.

The Savannah Indians won the South Atlantic League championship, as they finished the regular season in first place.

== Team changes ==
- The Savannah Pathfinders are renamed to the Savannah Indians.

== Teams ==
1906 South Atlantic League
Team	City	MLB Affiliate	Stadium
Augusta Tourists	Augusta, Georgia	None	Warren Park
Charleston Sea Gulls	Charleston, South Carolina	None	Hampton Park Field
Columbia Gamecocks	Columbia, South Carolina	None	Comer Field
Jacksonville Jays	Jacksonville, Florida	None	Dixieland Park
Macon Brigands	Macon, Georgia	None	Central City Park
Savannah Indians	Savannah, Georgia	None	Bolton Street Park

== Map of teams ==
South Atlantic League teams

== Regular season ==
=== Summary ===
- The Savannah Indians finished with the best record in the regular season, winning their first South Atlantic League pennant.

=== Standings ===
South Atlantic League
Team	Win	Loss	%	GB
Savannah Indians	72	41	.637	–
Augusta Tourists	70	45	.609	3
Macon Brigands	58	53	.523	13
Columbia Gamecocks	52	59	.468	19
Charleston Sea Gulls	48	61	.440	22
Jacksonville Jays	36	77	.319	36

== League Leaders ==
=== Batting leaders ===
Stat	Player	Total
AVG	Eddie Sabrie, Savannah Indians	.290
H	Eddie Sabrie, Savannah Indians	117
R	Frank King, Savannah Indians	56
SB	Frank King, Savannah Indians	55

=== Pitching leaders ===
Stat	Player	Total
W	Nap Rucker, Augusta Tourists	27

== See also ==
- 1906 Major League Baseball season
