= Perry Lipe =

American baseball player and manager

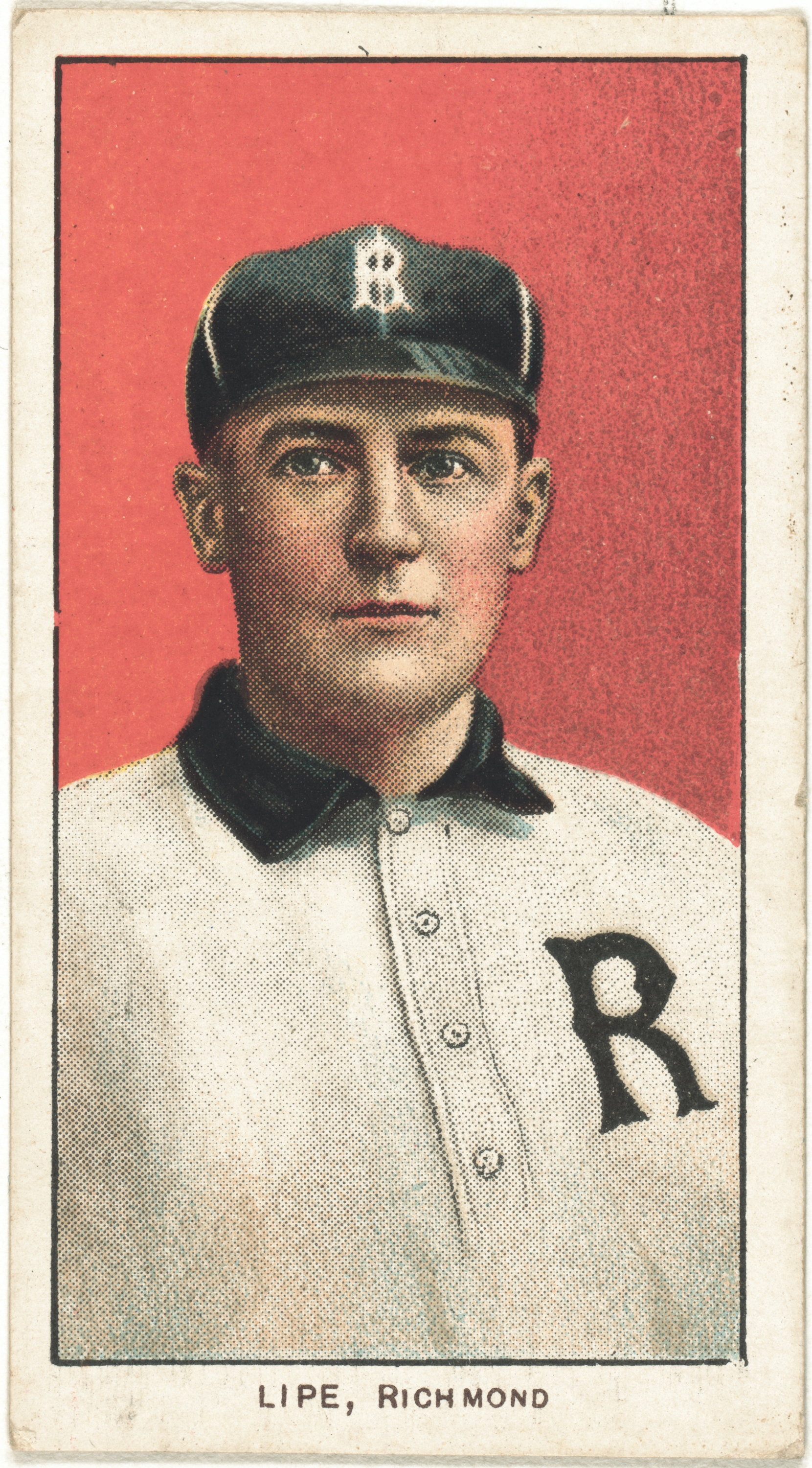

Perry Hamilton Lipe (February 14, 1875 – January 25, 1955 in Irving, Illinois, United States) was a long-time minor league baseball player and manager.

He played from 1898 to 1916, though a statistical record from 1901 to 1916 is all that is available. In that time, the third basemen perennially hit near the Mendoza Line, hitting below .200 at least three times. His highest-known season batting average was .249, which he accomplished with the Macon Brigands in 1905. Although he never played major league baseball, Lipe held the distinction of holding the record for most consecutive games in professional baseball at 1,127, until major leaguer Everett Scott bested the record on September 14, 1923. The streak was accumulated over seven years, 1903 to 1909, with three different teams (Greenville, Mississippi; Macon, Georgia; and Richmond, Virginia). Lipe missed only a single inning - the ninth inning of a game on June 10, 1909 - during the streak.

He managed the Brigands (1906-1907), Richmond Colts (1908-1909), Macon Peaches (1910-1911), Savannah Indians (1912), Savannah Colts (1913 to 1915) and Albany Babies (1916). He led the Richmond Colts (1908) and Savannah Colts (1914) to league championships.
