= James Durham (baseball) =

American baseball player (1881–1949)

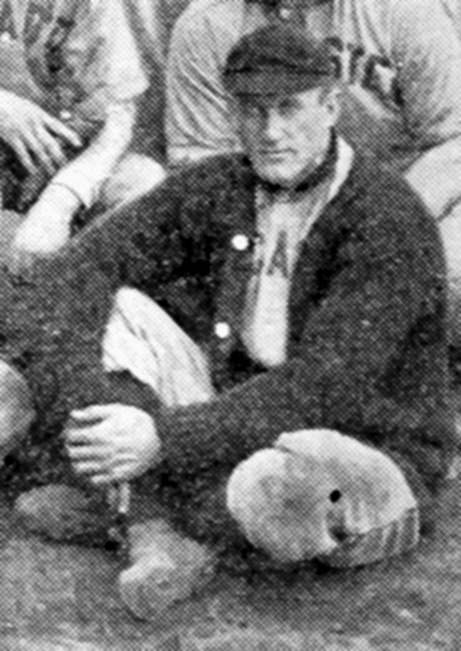
- Pitcher / Outfielder
- Born: October 7, 1881; Douglass, Kansas, U.S.
- Died: May 7, 1949 (aged 67); Coffeyville, Kansas, U.S.
- Batted: Right Threw: Right

MLB debut
- September 15, 1902, for the Chicago White Sox

Last MLB appearance
- September 28, 1902, for the Chicago White Sox

MLB statistics
- Win–loss record: 1–1
- Earned run average: 5.85
- Strikeouts: 3
- Stats at Baseball Reference

Teams
- Chicago White Sox (1902)

James Garfield Durham (October 7, 1881 – May 7, 1949) was an American professional baseball player, a pitcher in Major League Baseball. He played for the Chicago White Sox in 1902.
