= Leo Townsend (baseball) =

American baseball player (1891-1976)

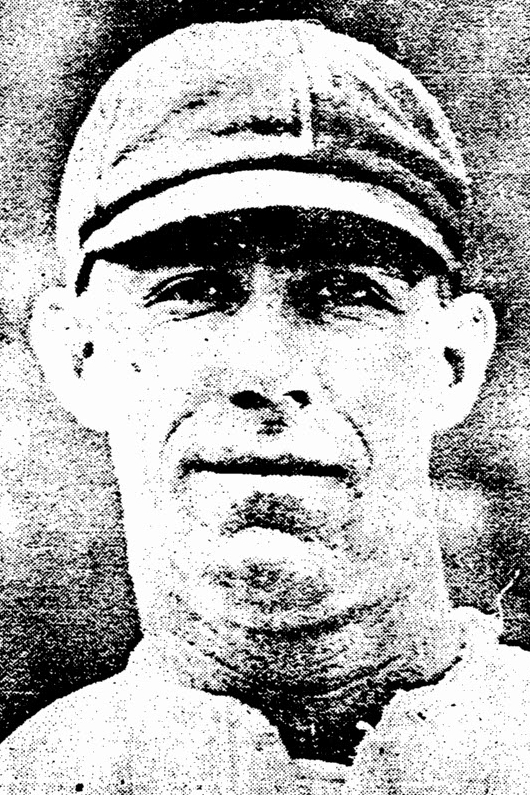
- Pitcher
- Born: January 15, 1891; Mobile, Alabama, U.S.
- Died: December 3, 1976 (aged 85); Mobile, Alabama, U.S.
- Batted: Left Threw: Left

MLB debut
- September 8, 1920, for the Boston Braves

Last MLB appearance
- May 27, 1921, for the Boston Braves

MLB statistics
- Win–loss record: 2–3
- Earned run average: 2.81
- Strikeouts: 0
- Stats at Baseball Reference

Teams
- Boston Braves (1920–1921)

Leo Alphonse Townsend (January 15, 1891 – December 3, 1976) was an American pitcher for the Boston Braves from 1920 to 1921. He is the only major league pitcher to pitch more than 19 innings without a strikeout. He threw 25 2/3 innings. Townsend had two wins, three losses, and a below-average 2.81 earned run average.
