= Charlie Luskey =

American baseball player (1876–1962)

- Outfielder
- Born: April 6, 1876; Washington, D.C., U.S.
- Died: December 20, 1962 (aged 86); Bethesda, Maryland, U.S.
- Batted: Right Threw: Right

MLB debut
- September 12, 1901, for the Washington Senators

Last MLB appearance
- September 23, 1901, for the Washington Senators

MLB statistics
- Batting average: .195
- Home runs: 0
- Runs batted in: 3
- Stats at Baseball Reference

Teams
- Washington Senators (1901)

Charles Melton Luskey (April 6, 1876 – December 20, 1962) was an American outfielder in Major League Baseball. He played for the Washington Senators in 1901.
