= Sam Mayer (baseball) =

Major League Baseball outfielder

- Outfielder
- Born: February 28, 1893; Atlanta, Georgia, U.S.
- Died: July 1, 1962 (aged 69); Atlanta, Georgia, U.S.
- Batted: Right Threw: Left

MLB debut
- September 4, 1915, for the Washington Senators

Last MLB appearance
- September 29, 1915, for the Washington Senators

MLB statistics
- Batting average: .241
- Home runs: 1
- Runs batted in: 4
- Stats at Baseball Reference

Teams
- Washington Senators (1915)

Samuel Frankel Mayer (February 28, 1893 – July 1, 1962) was an American outfielder in Major League Baseball. He played for the Washington Senators. He was Jewish.
