= Mike Handiboe =

American baseball player (1887-1953)

- Outfielder
- Born: July 21, 1887; Washington, D.C., U.S.
- Died: January 31, 1953 (aged 65); Savannah, Georgia, U.S.
- Batted: Left Threw: Left

MLB debut
- September 8, 1911, for the New York Highlanders

Last MLB appearance
- September 19, 1911, for the New York Highlanders

MLB statistics
- Batting average: .067
- Home runs: 0
- Runs batted in: 0
- Stats at Baseball Reference

Teams
- New York Highlanders (1911)

Aloysius James "Mike" Handiboe (July 21, 1887 – January 31, 1953), nicknamed "Coalyard Mike", was an American Major League Baseball outfielder. Handiboe played for the New York Highlanders in 1911. In five career games, he had one hit in 15 at-bats, with two walks. He batted and threw left-handed.

Handiboe was born in Washington, D.C.. He died at his home in Savannah, Georgia on January 31, 1953. He spent 33 years as an employee of the Central of Georgia Railway and served as a choir director at the Cathedral of St. John the Baptist in Savannah for 10 years. He composed his own piece for the choir known as "St. Patrick's Day in Savannah".
