= Scotty Alcock =

American baseball player (1885–1973)

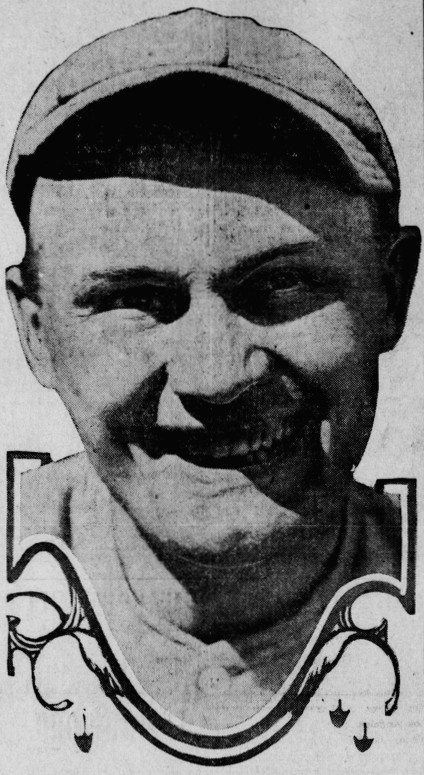
- Third baseman
- Born: November 29, 1885; Wooster, Ohio, U.S.
- Died: January 30, 1973 (aged 87); Wooster, Ohio, U.S.
- Batted: Right Threw: Right

MLB debut
- April 19, 1914, for the Chicago White Sox

Last MLB appearance
- August 2, 1914, for the Chicago White Sox

MLB statistics
- Batting average: .173
- Home runs: 0
- Hits: 27
- Runs batted in: 7
- Stats at Baseball Reference

Teams
- Chicago White Sox (1914)

John Forbes "Scotty" Alcock (November 29, 1885 – January 30, 1973) was an American Major League Baseball player who played one season with the Chicago White Sox in 1914.
