= Knoxville Reds =

- 1909–1914; Knoxville, Tennessee

Minor league affiliations
- Previous classes: Class D (1910–1914); Class B (1909)
- Previous leagues: Appalachian League (1911–1914); Southeastern League (1910); South Atlantic League (1909)

Major league affiliations
- Previous teams: Unaffiliated (1909–1914)

Minor league titles
- Pennants (1): 1910

Team data
- Name: Knoxville Reds (1912–1914); Knoxville Appalachians (1909–1911)
- Ballpark: Chilhowee Park (1909–1914)

The Knoxville Reds were a minor league baseball team that played in Knoxville, Tennessee, from 1909 to 1914. The team was known as the Knoxville Appalachians from 1909 to 1911 before adopting the Reds moniker. They were members of the Class B South Atlantic League (1909) and the Southeastern League (1910) and Appalachian League (1911–1914), both Class D circuits. They played their home games at Chilhowee Park.

The 1910 Appalachians won the Southeastern League pennant with a 50–30 first-place finish.

== Major leaguers ==
Seven Appalachians/Reds also competed for major league teams during their careers.

- Nick Cullop (1911), played for the Cleveland Naps (1914) Kansas City Packers (1914–15), New York Yankees (1916–17), and St. Louis Browns (1921).
- Dixie Davis (1911–12) played for the Cincinnati Reds (1912), Chicago White Sox (1915), Philadelphia Phillies (1918), and St. Louis Browns (1920–26).
- Pryor McElveen (1913) played for the Brooklyn Superbas/Dodgers (1909–1911).
- John Merritt (1913) played for the New York Giants (1913).
- Billy Meyer (1910–1912) played for the Chicago White Sox (1913) and Philadelphia Athletics (1916–17) and managed the Pittsburgh Pirates (1948–1952).
- Bill Morley (1912) played for the Washington Senators (1913)
- Fin Wilson (1911–12) played for the Brooklyn Tip-Tops (1914–15).
