= Savannah Colts =

1913-1915 baseball team

The Savannah Colts were a South Atlantic League baseball team based in Savannah, Georgia, United States that played from 1913 to 1915. Mainly under manager Perry Lipe, they won their league's championship in their first two years of existence.
