= Albany Babies =

- 1911–1916; Albany, Georgia

Minor league affiliations
- Previous classes: Class C
- League: South Atlantic League

The Albany Babies were a Class C league minor league baseball team located in Albany, Georgia. The team played in the South Atlantic League from 1911 to 1916.

== Notable players ==
- Erskine Mayer, pitcher

== Year-by-year record ==
Year	Record	Finish	Manager	Playoffs
1911	82-53	3rd	Harry Mathews / Bernie McCay	
1912	52-62	4th	Bernie McCay / Bill Duggleby	
1913	46-68	6th	Phil Wells	none
1914	64-57	3rd	Phil Wells / Frank Manush	Lost League Finals
1915	41-45	5th (t)	Frank Manush	
1916	30-53	--	Perry Lipe	Team disbanded July 23
