= South Atlantic League (1904–1963) =

American sports league in minor league baseball

- Classification: Class C (1904–1917, 1919–1920); Class B (1921–1930, 1936–1942); Class A (1946–1962); Double-A (1963)
- Sport: Baseball
- Founded: 1904
- Folded: 1963
- Replaced by: Southern League
- Country: United States

The South Atlantic League, nicknamed the SALLY League, was a Minor League Baseball league that operated in the Southern United States intermittently from 1904 to 1963. Initially Class C league, it was elevated to Class B in 1921, Class A in 1946, and Double-A in 1963. The circuit dissolved after the 1963 season and was refounded as the Southern League.

== History ==
The league first played a brief season under the "South Atlantic League" name in 1892. The Charleston Sea Gulls, Charlotte Hornets, Columbia Senators and Winston-Salem Blue Sluggers played in the 1892 independent league. The first South Atlantic League regular season schedule began on April 30, 1892. The league then folded on June 10, 1892. In the final standings, the Charleston Seagulls finished in first place with a 20–13 record, finishing 1.5 games ahead of second-place Winston-Salem.

The original South Atlantic League was founded in 1904 by Charles W. Boyer and J.B. Lucy as a Class C league, equivalent to an Advanced Rookie league in the pre-2021 minor league scheme. After a year of dormancy in 1918, it continued at that classification from 1919 to 1920 before being elevated to Class B (equivalent to short-season Class A before 2021 and a Class A league today)in 1921. The Great Depression caused the league to shut down from 1931 to 1935, but it returned at Class B from 1936 to 1942. Three more years of dormancy occurred during World War II, but the SALLY League was revived as a Class A circuit from 1946 to 1962.

In 1963, it was reclassified as a Double-A league along with the other Class A leagues. The circuit reorganized as the Southern League in 1964. Partly to distance itself from its history in the low minors, the newly-named league opted against claiming the SALLY League's history as its own. Thusly, the 51-year history and records of the league was retired with the South Atlantic League name.

In 1980, the Western Carolinas League resurrected the name as it became the current South Atlantic League.

== Cities represented 1904–1963 ==
- Albany, Georgia: Albany Babies (1911–1916)
- Asheville, North Carolina: Asheville Tourists (1924–1930, 1959–1963)
- Augusta, Georgia: Augusta Tourists (1904-1910, 1914–1917); Augusta Dollies (1919); Augusta Georgians (1920–1921); Augusta Tygers (1922–1929); Augusta Wolves (1930); Augusta Tigers (1936–1942, 1946–1952); Augusta Rams (1953–1954); Augusta Tigers (1955–1958); Augusta Yankees (1962–1963)
- Charleston, South Carolina: Charleston Sea Gulls (1904–1909, 1911, 1913–1917); Charleston Gulls (1919); Charleston Palmettos (1920); Charleston Pals (1921–1923); Charleston Rebels (1940–1942, 1946–1953); Charleston ChaSox (1959);Charleston White Sox (1960–1961)
- Charlotte, North Carolina: Charlotte Hornets (1919–1930, 1954–1963)
- Chattanooga, Tennessee: Chattanooga Lookouts (1963)
- Columbia, South Carolina: Columbia Skyscrapers (1904); Columbia Gamecocks (1905-1910); Columbia Commies (1911); Columbia Comers (1912, 1914–1917, 1919–1923, 1925–1930); Columbia Senators (1936–1937); Columbia Reds (1938–1942, 1946–1955, 1960–1961); Columbia Gems (1956–1957)
- Columbus, Georgia: Columbus Foxes (1909–1917); Columbus Red (1936–1942); Cardinals (1946–1955); Columbus Foxes (1956–1957); Columbus Pirates (1959)
- Gastonia, North Carolina: Gastonia Comers (1923); Gastonia Pirates (1959)
- Greenville, South Carolina: Greenville Spinners (1919–1930, 1938-1942, 1946–1950, 1961–1962)
- Jacksonville, Florida: Jacksonville Jays (1904–1910); Jacksonville Tarpons (1911–1916); Jacksonville Roses (1917); Jacksonville Tars (1936–1942, 1946–1952); Jacksonville Braves (1953–1960); Jacksonville Jets (1961)
- Knoxville, Tennessee: Knoxville Appalachians (1909); Knoxville Smokies (1925–1929, 1956–1963)
- Lynchburg, Virginia: Lynchburg White Sox (1962–1963)
- Macon, Georgia: Macon Highlanders (1904); Macon Brigands (1905–1907); Macon Peaches (1908–1915); Macon Tigers (1916–1917); Macon Peaches (1923–1930, 1936–1942, 1946–1955); Macon Dodgers (1956–1960); Macon Peaches (1962–1963)
- Montgomery, Alabama: Montgomery Rebels (1916, 1951, 1954–1956); Montgomery Grays (1952–1953)
- Nashville, Tennessee: Nashville Vols (1963)
- Portsmouth, Virginia & Norfolk, Virginia: Portsmouth-Norfolk Tides (1961–1962)
- Savannah, Georgia: Savannah Pathfinders (1904–1905); Savannah Indians (1906–1912); Savannah Colts (1913–1915) Savannah Indians (1936–1942, 1946–1953); Savannah Athletics (1954–1955); Savannah Redlegs (1956–1958); Savannah Reds (1959); Savannah Pirates (1960); Savannah White Sox (1962)
- South Atlantic League Orphans
- Spartanburg, South Carolina: Spartanburg Pioneers (1919–1921); Spartanburg Spartans (1922–1929, 1938–1940)

== Champions ==
League champions were determined by different means throughout the league's history. Playoffs were held in most seasons, while in others the champions were simply the regular season pennant winners.

Year	Champion	Score	Runner-up
1904	Macon Peaches	—	—
1905	Macon Peaches	—	—
1906	Savannah Indians	—	—
1907	Charleston Sea Gulls	—	—
1908	Jacksonville Jays	—	—
1909	Chattanooga Lookouts	4–3	Augusta Tourists
1910	Columbus Foxes	—	—
1911	Columbus Foxes	4–2	Columbia Commies
1912	Jacksonville Tarpons	4–1	Columbus Foxes
1913	Savannah Colts	—	—
1914	Savannah Colts	4–2	Albany Babies
1915	Columbia Comers	4–1–2	Macon Peaches
1916	Augusta Tourists	4–0	Columbia Comers
1917	Columbia Comers	4–2	Charleston Sea Gulls
1918	Not in operation		
1919	Columbia Comers	—	—
1920	Columbia Comers	—	—
1921	Columbia Comers	—	—
1922	Charleston Pals	—	—
1923	Charlotte Hornets	4–1	Macon Peaches
1924	Augusta Tygers	—	—
1925	Spartanburg Spartans	—	—
1926	Greenville Spinners	—	—
1927	Greenville Spinners	—	—
1928	Asheville Tourists	—	—
1929	Knoxville Smokies	—	Asheville Tourists
1930	Greenville Spinners	4–2	Macon Peaches
1931	Not in operation		
1932	Not in operation		
1933	Not in operation		
1934	Not in operation		
1935	Not in operation		
1936	Columbus Red Birds	4–2	Jacksonville Tars
1937	Savannah Indians	3–1	Macon Peaches
1938	Macon Peaches	4–3	Savannah Indians
1939	Augusta Tigers	4–0	Savannah Indians
1940	Columbus Red Birds	4–2	Macon Peaches
1941	Columbia Reds	4–2	Macon Peaches
1942	Augusta Tigers	4–0	Columbia Reds
1943	Not in operation		
1944	Not in operation		
1945	Not in operation		
1946	Augusta Tigers	—	—
1947	Savannah Indians	4–1	Augusta Tigers
1948	Greenville Spinners	4–1	Columbia Reds
1949	Macon Peaches	4–1	Greenville Spinners
1950	Macon Peaches	4–0	Columbia Reds
1951	Montgomery Rebels	4–0	Jacksonville Tars
1952	Montgomery Grays	4–2	Macon Peaches
1953	Columbia Reds	4–3	Jacksonville Braves
1954	Savannah Athletics	4–3	Jacksonville Braves
1955	Augusta Tigers	2–1	Montgomery Rebels
1956	Jacksonville Braves	2–0	Columbus Foxes
1957	Charlotte Hornets	2–1	Augusta Tigers
1958	Macon Dodgers	2–0	Jacksonville Braves
1959	Gastonia Pirates	3–0	Charleston ChaSox
1960	Savannah Pirates	3–0	Knoxville Smokies
1961	Asheville Tourists	—	—
1962	Macon Peaches	3–1	Knoxville Smokies
1963	Augusta Yankees	—	—
