= Columbia Comers =

- 1904–1930; (1904–12, 1914–17, 1919–23, 1925–30); Columbia, South Carolina

Minor league affiliations
- Previous classes: Class B (1921-1930); Class C (1904-1920)
- Previous leagues: South Atlantic League

Major league affiliations
- Previous teams: Pittsburgh Pirates (1927-1930)

Minor league titles
- League titles: 4 (1917, 1919, 1920, 1921)

Team data
- Previous names: Columbia Commies (1911); Columbia Comers (1912); Gastonia Combers (1923) (second half of season); Columbia Blues (1910); Columbia Palmettos (1909); Columbia Chicks (1908); Columbia Gamecocks (1904-1907); Columbia Skyscrapers (1903-1904); Columbia Senators (1892)

The Columbia Comers were a minor league baseball team, based in Columbia, South Carolina and played in the South Atlantic League.

Columbia's first professional team was known as the Senators and played in the short-lived first South Atlantic League season in 1892. The city did not have a professional baseball team again until 1903 when the Columbia Skyscrapers played a non-league season. In 1904, the Skyscrapers joined the new South Atlantic League and changed their name to the Columbia Gamecocks midway through the season, playing under that moniker for three and a half years. The team played as the Columbia Chicks in 1908, the Columbia Palmettos in 1909, and the Columbia Blues in 1910. In 1911, the club was finally named the Columbia Comers which was short for Commissioners. During their first year with the new name, the Comers won the second half of the South Atlantic League season before losing to the Columbus Foxes in the league championship playoff series.

In 1911, the club was finally named the Comers, and would eventually win four league titles. They briefly played part of their 1923 season in Gastonia, North Carolina as the Gastonia Combers. From 1927 until 1930, the team was an affiliate of the Pittsburgh Pirates.

== Season-by-season ==
Year	Record	Finish	Manager	Playoffs
1892	12-11	-	A. D. Palmer	
1903	35-16	-	W. E. Law	
1904	47-62	5th	John Grim / William Engle	
1905	52-75	6th	Billy Earle / Robert Wallace / Charlie Dexter	
1906	52-59	4th	Ed Granville	
1907	36-87	6th	Jay Kanzler / Bill Hallman / Edward Ransick	
1908	46-58	4th	Win Clark	
1909	41-78	8th	Arthur Granville	
1910	46-72	6th	William Breitenstein / Dred Cavender	
1911	87-49	1st	Dred Cavender / Langdon 'Bill' Clark	Lost League Finals to Columbus Foxes four games to two.
1912	41-75	6th	Langdon 'Bill' Clark / Ted McGrew / Herman 'Humpty' Badel	
1914	60-66	4th	Doug Harbison / Champ Osteen	
1915	44-42	4th	Connie Lewis / Doug Harbison	
1916	72-50	1st	Doug Harbison	Lost League Finals to the Augusta Tourists, four games to none.
1917	40-28	2nd	Jack Corbett	League Champs; No playoffs
1919	55-39	1st	Tom Clarke	League Champs; No playoffs
1920	76-44	1st	Zinn Beck	League Champs; No playoffs
1921	95-53	1st	Zinn Beck	League Champs; No playoffs
1922	72-59	3rd	Zinn Beck	
1923	44-96	6th	Scotty Alcock / Roxy Middleton	The Columbia Baseball Association folded mid-season in 1923 and forfeited its franchise rights. The team was taken over by the league on July 1 and played the remaining home games of the season in Gastonia, NC.
1925	47-82	7th	Olin Perrin / Babe Ganzel / Herbert Brenner	
1926	40-106	8th	Herbert Brenner / Billy Purtell	
1927	65-81	7th	Gabby Street	
1928	67-78	6th	Joe Kelly	
1929	68-79	7th	Joe Kelly	
1930	39-101	6th	Marty Fielder / Lee Stebbins	
