= Columbus Foxes =

- 1909–1958; (1909–1917, 1926–1932, 1936–1942, 1946–1959); Columbus, Georgia

Minor league affiliations
- Previous classes: Class D (1958); Class A (1946–1957); Class B (1926–1932, 1936–1942); Class C (1909–1917)
- League: South Atlantic League (1959)
- Previous leagues: Alabama–Florida League (1958); South Atlantic League (1936–1942, 1946–1958); Southeastern League (1926–1932); South Atlantic League (1909–1917)

Major league affiliations
- Previous teams: Pittsburgh Pirates (1959); Los Angeles Dodgers (1958); St. Louis Cardinals (1957); Baltimore Orioles (1956); St. Louis Cardinals (1936–1942, 1946–1955)

Minor league titles
- League titles (6): 1910; 1911; 1915; 1926; 1936; 1940

Team data
- Previous names: Columbus Pirates (1959); Columbus Foxes (1956–1958); Columbus Cardinals (1946–1955); Columbus Red Birds (1936–1942); Columbus Foxes (1909–1917, 1926–1932)
- Previous parks: Golden Park

The Columbus Foxes were a minor league baseball team that played in Columbus, Georgia. USA.

== History ==
The team originally played in the South Atlantic League from 1909 to 1917, then reformed in the Southeastern League from 1926 to 1932.

It resurfaced as a St. Louis Cardinals' affiliate known first as the Columbus Red Birds and then the Columbus Cardinals from 1936 to 1955 in the South Atlantic League. As the Red Birds, it won two league championships, first in 1936 under manager Eddie Dyer, and second in 1940 under manager Clay Hopper.

The team name returned to the Foxes after the Cardinals left in 1956 and became affiliated with the Baltimore Orioles in 1956, the Cardinals again in 1957, and the Los Angeles Dodgers in 1958. The team played in the Alabama–Florida League in 1958.

As a Pittsburgh Pirates' affiliate in 1959, they were known as the Columbus Pirates. It moved to Gastonia, North Carolina, on July 6, 1959, and became the Gastonia Pirates.

== The ballpark ==
Beginning in 1926, the Foxes played at Golden Park, located at 100 4th Street Columbus, Georgia 31901. Golden Park is still in use today and was renovated and used in the 1996 Olympic Games for softball.

== Notable alumni ==
=== Baseball Hall of Fame alumni ===
- Walter Alston (1939) inducted, 1983
- Bob Gibson (1957) inducted, 1981
- Enos Slaughter (1936) inducted, 1985

=== Notable alumni ===
- Luis Arroyo (1954) 2 x MLB All-Star
- Jackie Brandt (1954) 2 x MLB All-Star
- Hub Collins (1885) 1890 NL Hits Leader; Died Age 28
- Eddie Dyer (1936, MGR) Manager: 1946 World Series Champion St. Louis Cardinals
- Lenny Green (1956)
- Jim Hearn (1942) MLB All-Star; 1950 NL ERA Title
- Ray Jablonski (1950) MLB All-Star
- Oscar Judd (1936) MLB All-Star
- Eddie Kazak (1946) MLB All-Star
- George Kissell (1954)
- Clyde Kluttz (1940)
- Denny Lyons (1885)
- Skeeter Newsome (1956)
- Rip Repulski (1949–1950) MLB All-Star
- Dick Sisler (1941) MLB All-Star
- Dave Wickersham (1959)
