= Jacksonville Tarpons =

- 1904–1917; Jacksonville, Florida

Minor league affiliations
- Previous classes: Class-C
- League: South Atlantic League

Minor league titles
- League titles: 1908, 1912

Team data
- Previous names: Jacksonville Roses (1917); Jacksonville Tarpons (1911–1916); Jacksonville Jays (1904–1910)
- Previous parks: Dixieland Park

The Jacksonville Tarpons were a minor league baseball team based in Jacksonville, Florida. They played in the Class-C South Atlantic League from 1904 through 1917. They were originally named the Jacksonville Jays from 1904 to 1910, then were the Tarpons through 1916 before being the Jacksonville Roses their last season in 1917.
