= Macon Peaches =

- 1892–1967; (1892–1894, 1904–1917; 1923–1930; 1932; 1936–1942; 1946–1964; 1966–1967); Macon, Georgia

Minor league affiliations
- Previous classes: Double A (1963–1964; 1966–1967); Class A (1962); Class AA (1961); Class A (1946–1960); Class B (1923–1930; 1932; 1936–1942); Class C (1904–1917); Class B (1892–1894)
- Previous leagues: Southern League (1964; 1966–1967); South Atlantic League (1962–1963); Southern Association (1961); South Atlantic League (1936–1942; 1946–1960); Southeastern League (1932); South Atlantic League (1904–1917, 1923–1930); Southern League (1892–1894)

Major league affiliations
- Previous teams: Pittsburgh Pirates (1967); Philadelphia Phillies (1966); Cincinnati Reds (1962–1964); Brooklyn/Los Angeles Dodgers (1956–1960); Chicago Cubs (1941–1942, 1946–1949, 1952–1955); Brooklyn Dodgers (1939–1940); Cincinnati Reds (1936); Brooklyn Dodgers (1929–1930)

Minor league titles
- League titles (9): 1904; 1905; 1930; 1938; 1942; 1949; 1950; 1958; 1962
- Pennants (1): 1893 (2nd half)

Team data
- Previous names: Macon Peaches (1962–1964, 1966–1967); Macon Dodgers (1956–1960); Macon Peaches (1923–1930, 1932, 1936–1942, 1946–1955); Macon Tigers (1916–1917); Macon Peaches (1908–1915); Macon Brigands (1905–1907); Macon Highlanders (1904); Macon Hornets (1893–1894); Macon Central City (1892–1893)
- Previous parks: Luther Williams Field (1926–1967); Central City Park (1892–1926)

The Macon Peaches was the predominant name of the American minor league baseball franchise representing Macon, Georgia, during the 20th century.

== History ==
Although Macon did not field teams during and immediately after World War I, the height of the Great Depression and World War II, the name Peaches was used continuously between 1907 and 1955, except for 1916–1917. The Peaches nickname was also used from 1961–1964, 1966–1967, and 1980–1982. Much of that time, the Peaches played in the original South Atlantic "Sally" League, although they made brief appearances in the Southeastern League and the Southern Association. After 1929, the team played at Luther Williams Field.

Macon was represented by professional baseball teams in the 19th century and joined the Sally League in 1904 as the Highlanders. From 1956–1960, Macon's team was known as the Macon Dodgers, adopting the name of their parent club.

=== Reds' farm team produced Rose, Pérez, May and Helms ===
From 1962–1964, the Peaches were an important upper-level affiliate (Double-A after 1962) of the Cincinnati Reds, producing Pete Rose, Tony Pérez, Lee May and Tommy Helms. All four were members of Cincinnati's first "Big Red Machine" team, the 1970 National League champions. Rose and Pérez would be cornerstones of the dynasty, while May and Helms would be traded to the Houston Astros after 1971 to obtain Baseball Hall of Fame second baseman Joe Morgan, who would help lead the Reds to the NL pennant in 1972 and World Series titles in 1975 and 1976.

Macon was Rose's last minor league address before he launched his Major League career as the 1963 National League Rookie of the Year. He had batted .330 for the 1962 Peaches.

== After the Peaches ==
In 1980, a new Macon Peaches team formed in the South Atlantic League and after 1982, this franchise adopted the name Redbirds. This team relocated to Savannah, Georgia, and became the Savannah Cardinals, but were replaced in Macon by the relocated Greenwood Pirates, who renamed themselves the Macon Pirates. The Macon Pirates would move to Augusta, Georgia, after the 1987 season, where they played as the Augusta Pirates.

After the 1990 season, the South Atlantic League returned to Macon with the relocation of the Sumter Braves and the Sumter Braves became the Macon Braves, Macon's last affiliated team and last South Atlantic League team. Many well known major league players came from the Macon Braves, such as Chipper Jones, Andruw Jones, Rafael Furcal, Tony Graffanino, John Rocker, John Smoltz, and Marcus Giles. The Macon Braves relocated to Rome, Georgia and were renamed to the Rome Braves.

After losing the Macon Braves, Macon was home to an Independent professional team, the Macon Music in the South Coast League, for one season (2007) as well as a different independent league baseball team known as the Macon Pinetoppers (2010) that called Luther Williams Field "home".

An independent league baseball team called the Macon Peaches played in the 21st century Southeastern League in 2003.

== Notable alumni ==
- Al Lopez Inducted Baseball Hall of Fame, 1997
- Tony Pérez (1963) Inducted Baseball Hall of Fame, 2000
- Rube Benton (1910)
- Jim Brosnan (1966)
- Jackie Brown
- Smoky Burgess (1947) 9x MLB All-Star
- Al Campanis (1940)
- Bruce Dal Canton (1967)
- Abner Dalrymple (1893) 1885 NL Home Run Leader
- Dock Ellis (1967) MLB All-Star
- Raymond Doster (1967-1968)
- Phil Douglas (1911)
- Chick Fullis (1927)
- Tommy Helms (1962) 2x MLB All-Star; 1966 NL Rookie of the Year
- Wes Helms (1995)
- Bobo Holloman (1947–1948)
- Gordon Maltzberger
- Lee May (1963) 3x MLB All-Star; 1976 AL RBI Leader
- Pepper Martin (1955, MGR) 4x MLB All-Star
- Bob Moose (1963)
- Billy Muffett (1955)
- Bobo Newsom (1930) 4x MLB All-Star
- Al Oliver (1967) 7x MLB All-Star; 1982 AL Batting Champion
- Bob Oliver (1967)
- Andy Pafko (1942) 5x MLB All-Star
- Mel Queen (1962)
- Paul Richards (1929-1930)
- Pete Rose (1962) 17x MLB All-Star; 1963 NL Rookie of the Year; All-Time MLB Hits Leader
- Johnny Rucker
- Barney Schultz (1950)
- Art Shamsky (1962)
- John Smiley (1984-1985) 2x MLB All-Star
- Eddie Stanky (1939, 1941) 3x MLB All-Star
- Carl Taylor
- Hippo Vaughn (1909) 1918 NL ERA, Wins, Strikeout Leader

== See also ==
- Macon Bacon
