= List of Clemson Tigers head baseball coaches =

The Clemson Tigers baseball program is a college baseball team that represents Clemson University in the Atlantic Division of the Atlantic Coast Conference in the National Collegiate Athletic Association. The team has had 28 head coaches since it started playing organized baseball in the 1896 season. The current coach is Erik Bakich, who took over the head coaching position in 2023.

Bill Wilhelm is the all-time leader in games coached (1,707), seasons coached (36), and total wins (1,161). John Heisman has the highest winning percentage of any Tiger coach with a 28–6–1 record (.814) in his three years in Clemson. R. T. V. Bowman has the lowest winning percentage (.250 in two seasons).

In 2011, Wilhelm was inducted into the National College Baseball Hall of Fame.

== Key ==
General
#	Number of coaches (Note: A running total of the number of head coaches.)
GC	Games coached
†	Elected to the National College Baseball Hall of Fame

Overall
OW	Wins
OL	Losses
OT	Ties
O%	Winning percentage

Conference (Note: Clemson was a member of the Southern Intercollegiate Athletic Association from 1900 until 1923, but the conference did not sponsor baseball. The Southern Conference, of which Clemson was a member from 1924 until 1953, did not sponsor baseball until 1947. Since 1954, Clemson has been a member of the Atlantic Coast Conference.)
CW	Wins
CL	Losses
CT	Ties
C%	Winning percentage

Postseason (Note: Postseason play involving the NCAA Division I Baseball Championship.)
PA	Total Appearances (Note: Postseason appearances include seasons with NCAA Division I Baseball Championship bids since the tournament began in 1947.)
PW	Total Wins
PL	Total Losses
WA	College World Series appearances (Note: College World Series appearances include seasons with CWS bids since the tournament began in 1947.)
WW	College World Series wins
WL	College World Series losses

Championships
DC	Division regular season (Note: The Atlantic Coast Conference split into two divisions in 2006. Since then, regular season conference championships are no longer awarded.)
CC	Conference regular season
CT	Conference tournament (Note: The Southern Conference held a tournament from 1950 until 1953. The Atlantic Coast Conference began a baseball tournament in 1974. The tournament was not held in 1979.)

== Coaches ==
List of head baseball coaches showing season(s) coached, overall records, conference records, postseason records, championships and selected awards*Statistics correct as of the end of the 2019 NCAA Division I baseball season
#	Name	Term (Note: Clemson did not sponsor a baseball team in 1897 or 1944.)	GC	OW	OL	OT	O%	CW	CL	CT	C%	PA	PW	PL	WA	WW	WL	DCs	CCs	CTs	NCs	Awards (Note: National, regional and conference coach of the year awards.)
1	R. T. V. Bowman	1896, 1898	8	2	6	0	.250	—	—	—	—	—	—	—	—	—	—	—	—	—	0	—
2	Unknown	1899–1900	17	12	5	0	.706	—	—	—	—	—	—	—	—	—	—	—	—	—	0	—
3	John Heisman	1901–1903	35	28	6	1	.814	—	—	—	—	—	—	—	—	—	—	—	—	—	0	—
4	John McMakin	1904–1906	46	20	23	3	.467	—	—	—	—	—	—	—	—	—	—	—	—	—	0	—
5	Frank Shaughnessy	1907	17	9	7	1	.559	—	—	—	—	—	—	—	—	—	—	—	—	—	0	—
6	Robert Lynch	1908	17	6	11	0	.353	—	—	—	—	—	—	—	—	—	—	—	—	—	0	—
7	Jesse Reynolds	1909	22	10	12	0	.455	—	—	—	—	—	—	—	—	—	—	—	—	—	0	—
8	Joe Holland	1910	21	10	11	0	.476	—	—	—	—	—	—	—	—	—	—	—	—	—	0	—
9	Frank Dobson	1911–1913	58	37	21	0	.638	—	—	—	—	—	—	—	—	—	—	—	—	—	0	—
10	Thomas Robertson	1914	22	16	6	0	.727	—	—	—	—	—	—	—	—	—	—	—	—	—	0	—
11	Vet Sitton	1915–1916	45	26	18	1	.589	—	—	—	—	—	—	—	—	—	—	—	—	—	0	—
12	Country Morris	1917, 1920	45	17	28	0	.378	—	—	—	—	—	—	—	—	—	—	—	—	—	0	—
13	Edward Donahue	1918–1919	39	17	21	1	.449	—	—	—	—	—	—	—	—	—	—	—	—	—	0	—
14	Larry Conover	1921	19	5	14	0	.263	—	—	—	—	—	—	—	—	—	—	—	—	—	0	—
15	L. V. H. Durfee	1922–1924	56	29	26	1	.527	—	—	—	—	—	—	—	—	—	—	—	—	—	0	—
16	T. Everett May	1925	25	11	14	0	.440	—	—	—	—	—	—	—	—	—	—	—	—	—	0	—
17	Cul Richards	1926	19	8	11	0	.421	—	—	—	—	—	—	—	—	—	—	—	—	—	0	—
18	Tink Gillam	1927	25	11	13	1	.460	—	—	—	—	—	—	—	—	—	—	—	—	—	0	—
19	Joe Guyon	1928–1931	81	42	36	3	.537	—	—	—	—	—	—	—	—	—	—	—	—	—	0	—
20	Jess Neely	1932–1938	135	67	66	2	.504	—	—	—	—	—	—	—	—	—	—	—	—	—	0	—
21	Randy Hinson	1939–1940, 1946–1947	79	58	19	2	.747	13	2	0	.867	1	3	2	0	0	0	—	1	—	0	—
22	Tom Rogers	1941–1942	34	18	14	2	.558	—	—	—	—	—	—	—	—	—	—	—	—	—	0	—
23	Frank Howard	1943	15	12	3	0	.800	—	—	—	—	—	—	—	—	—	—	—	—	—	0	—
24	Walter T. Cox	1945, 1948–1951	119	70	48	1	.592	47	18	1	.720	1	0	2	0	0	0	—	0	0	0	—
25	Robert W. Smith	1952–1957	119	52	65	2	.445	39	50	2	.440 (Note: 21–16 (.568) against SoCon opponents and 18–34–2 (.352) against ACC opponents.)	2	3	4	—	—	—	—	1	0	0	—
26	Bill Wilhelm †	1958–1993	1707	1161	536	10	.683	378	158	1	.706	17	42	36	6	4	12	—	20	7	0	ACC (1988, 91); ABCA District III (1991)
27	Jack Leggett	1994–2015	1189	812	376	1	.683	304	166	1	.646	17	65	39	6	8	12	2	2	2	0	ACC (1994, 95, 2006); ABCA Atlantic Region (2002, 10)
28	Monte Lee	2016–2022	251	168	83	0	.669	70	50	0	.583	4	8	9	—	—	—	1	0	1	0	—
29	Erik Bakich	2023–Present	243	164	79	0	.675	68	52	0	.567	3	5	6	—	—	—	1	0	1	0	—
