= Spartanburg Peaches =

- 1946–1955; Spartanburg, South Carolina

Minor league affiliations
- Class: Class B (1946–1955)
- League: Tri-State League (1946–1951)

Major league affiliations
- Team: St. Louis Browns (1946); Cleveland Indians (1947–1955)

Minor league titles
- League titles (2): 1951; 1955
- Conference titles (2): 1947; 1953
- Wild card berths (5): 1949; 1950; 1951; 1952; 1954

Team data
- Name: Spartanburg Peaches (1946–1955)
- Ballpark: Duncan Park (1946–1955)

The Spartanburg Peaches were a minor league baseball franchise based in Spartanburg, South Carolina. From 1946 to 1955, the "Peaches" teams played exclusively as members of the Class B level Tri-State League, capturing league pennants in 1947 and 1953 and league championships in 1951 and 1955. The Peaches were a minor league affiliate of the St. Louis Browns in 1946 and the Cleveland Indians from 1947 to 1955. The Spartanburg Peaches hosted their home minor league games at Duncan Park, which is still in use today after opening in 1926.

== History ==
=== 1946 to 1950 Tri-State League ===
Minor league baseball began in Spartanburg, North Carolina in 1904, when the "Spartanburg" team played the season as members of the independent Carolina Interstate League. The Peaches were preceded in minor league play by the 1939 Spartanburg Spartans, who ended a tenure as members of the Class B level South Atlantic League.

In 1946, Spartanburg resumed minor league play as a minor league affiliate of the St. Louis Browns, when the "Peaches" became members of the six-team Class B level Tri-State League, which reformed. The Anderson A's, Asheville Tourists, Charlotte Hornets, Knoxville Smokies and Shelby Cubs teams joined the Spartanburg Peaches in beginning league play on April 24, 1946.

The Spartanburg "Peaches" nickname corresponds with local agriculture history. There were peach orchards in the region in the era and the orchards continue today. The Peaches began play at Duncan Park, which would remain the team's home ballpark for their duration.

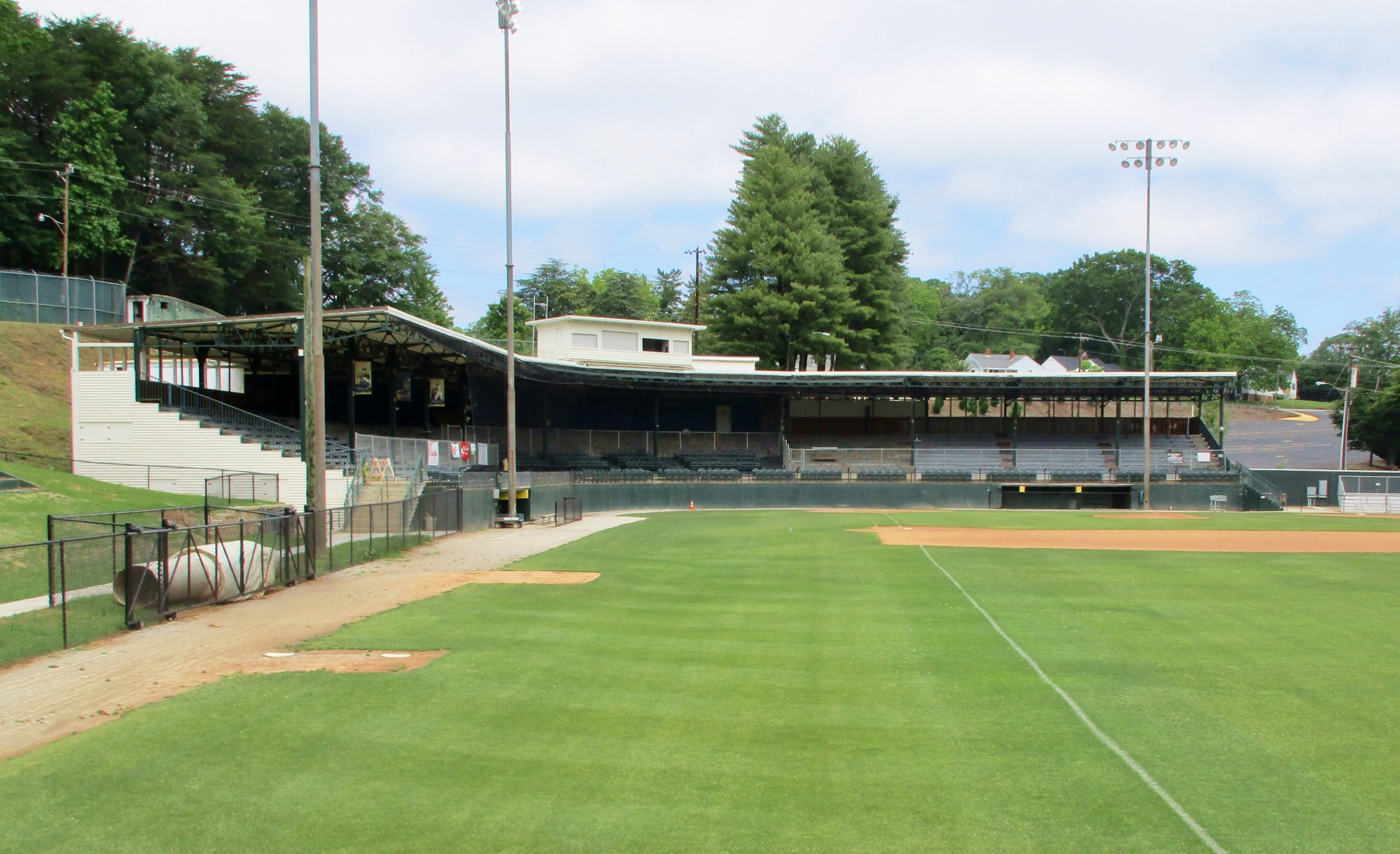
Duncan Park Stadium in 2016. The ballpark was listed on the National Register of Historic Places in 2016

The Peaches finished their first season of Tri-State League play in last place. With a 52–87 record in 1946, Spartanburg ended the season in sixth place in the six–team league regular season, finishing 41.0 games behind the first-place Charlotte Hornets. Spartanburg played the season under manager Ed Dancisak and did not qualify for the four team playoffs won by Charlotte. Pud Miller of Spartanburg led the Tri-State League with 19 home runs and pitcher Ralph Germano had 19 wins to lead the league.

The 1947 Spartanburg Peaches became a minor league affiliate of the Cleveland Indians and won the Tri-State League pennant, as the Class B level Tri-State League expanded to eight teams. After placing first with a 88–51 regular season record, finishing 4.0 games ahead of the second place Anderson Rebels, the Peaches qualified for the playoffs. Kerby Farrell managed the Peaches and began a tenure as the Spartanburg manager. In the first-round playoff series, the eventual champion Charlotte Hornets defeated the Peaches 4 games to 1. Pitcher James Kleckley of Spartanburg led the Tri-State League with 19 wins.

In 1948 Tri-State League play, the Peaches finished in next to last place in the regular season. With Kerby Farrell returning as manager, Spartanburg continued play as a Cleveland Indians affiliate and ended the 1948 season with a record of 68–77, placing seventh in the standings of the eight-team league. The Peaches finished 26.5 games behind the first place Asheville Tourists and did not qualify for the playoffs, won by the Fayetteville Cubs. Spartanburg's Len Cross hit 29 home runs to lead the Tri-State League.

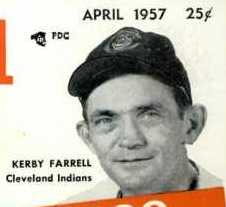
Kerby Farrell. April 1957 Baseball Digest cover (cropped). Farrell managed the Spartanburg Peaches from 1947 to 1950.

Continuing play as an affiliate of the Cleveland Indians, the 1949 Spartanburg Peaches advanced to the Tri–State League playoff finals. Spartanburg ended Tri–State League regular season with a record of 81–60, placing second in the eight-team league and finishing 2.0 games behind the first place Florence Steelers as Kerby Farrell returned as manager. In the playoffs, the Peaches defeated the Anderson Rebels 3 games to 1 and advanced. In the finals, Florence won the championship by defeating the Spartanburg Peaches 4 games to 2 in the finals.

In 1950, Spartanburg qualified for the 1950 Tri–State League playoffs, as Kerby Farrell again managed the team as a Cleveland Indians affiliate. The Peaches ended the 1950 Tri–State League regular season with a record of 80–63 to place third, finishing. 7.0 games behind the first place Knoxville Smokies. Spartanburg pitcher John Carmichael had 19 wins to lead the Tri-State League.

=== 1951 to 1955 Tri-State League, two championships ===
Playing under a new manager, the Spartanburg Peaches captured the 1951 Tri-State League championship. Under manager Harry Griswold, Spartanburg continued as a Cleveland Indians affiliate and placed fourth with a 73–67 record in the regular season, finishing 27.0 games behind the first place Charlotte Hornets. In the first-round playoff series, the Peaches defeated the pennant winning Charlotte team 3 games to 1 and advanced. In the finals, the Spartanburg Peaches swept the Ashville Tourists 4 games to 0 to win the Tri-State League championship. Spartanburg's Albert Neal led the Tri-State League with both 44 home runs and 154 RBI.

In 1952, Spartanburg continued play as a Cleveland Indians affiliate in the eight-team Class B level Tri-State League, qualified for the playoffs for a fourth straight season and advanced to the finals. The Peaches ended the Tri-State League regular season with a record of 83-55, placing third in the standings, 5.5 games behind the first place Gastonia Rockets. Merrill "Pinky" May served as the Spartanburg manager. In the first round of the four-team playoffs, the Spartanburg Peaches defeated the Gastonia three games to two. Advancing to the finals, the Peaches lost to the Charlotte Hornets 4 games to 1. Pitcher Bill Upton of Spartanburg had 21 wins to lead the Tri-state League.

Spartanburg won the Tri-State League pennant, remaining a Cleveland Indians affiliate, as the 1953 Tri-State League reduced to six teams. Playing under manager Jimmy Bloodworth, the Peaches won the regular season by a large margin, placing first the Tri-State League regular season standings with a 96–54 record, finishing 13.0 games ahead of the second place Ashville Tourists. In the first round of the four-team playoffs, the Charlotte Hornets swept Spartanburg in three games to end their season. The Peaches' Joe Fuller led the Tri-State League with both 228 total hits and 134 runs scored, while teammates James Finn Had 140 RBI and Lamar Bowen hit 26 home runs, both leading the league. Spartanburg pitcher Eugene Law had 24 wins to lead the Tri-State League.

Defending their Tri-State League championship in 1954, the Spartanburg Peaches qualified for the playoffs for a sixth straight season, as the league continued as a six-team Class B level league. With a final regular season record of 66–72, the Peaches placed fourth. Jimmy Bloodworth remained as manager as the Cleveland Indians affiliate Peaches ended the regular season 19.0 games behind the first place Ashville Tourists. In the four-team playoffs, Spartanburg lost in first round to the Knoxville Smokies 3 games to 2.

In the final season of the Tri-State League, the 1955 league was reduced to four teams and the Spartanburg Peaches were the 1955 Tri-State League champions. With the Ashville Tourists, Greenville Spinners and Rock Hill Chiefs teams in the league, the Peaches played a final season as a Cleveland Indians affiliate and ended their last season with a record of 74–44, playing under manager Spud Chandler. The Peaches won the league pennant, finishing 12.5 games ahead of second place Greenville in the overall standings. The Tri-State League played a split-season schedule in 1955, with Greenville winning the first half and Spartanburg winning the second half. The two teams then met in a final series, with Spartanburg winning the championship by sweeping Greenville in three games. Robert Jarvis of Spartanburg won the Tri-State batting title, hitting .361 with a league leading 157 total hits. Paul Jones had 18 home runs and scored 106 runs and William Kallas had 86 RBI, both league leaders.

The Tri-State League did not return to play in 1956. After an eight-season absence, minor league baseball returned to Spartanburg in 1963, when the Spartanburg Phillies began a second tenure as members of the South Atlantic League, returning to play in the league.

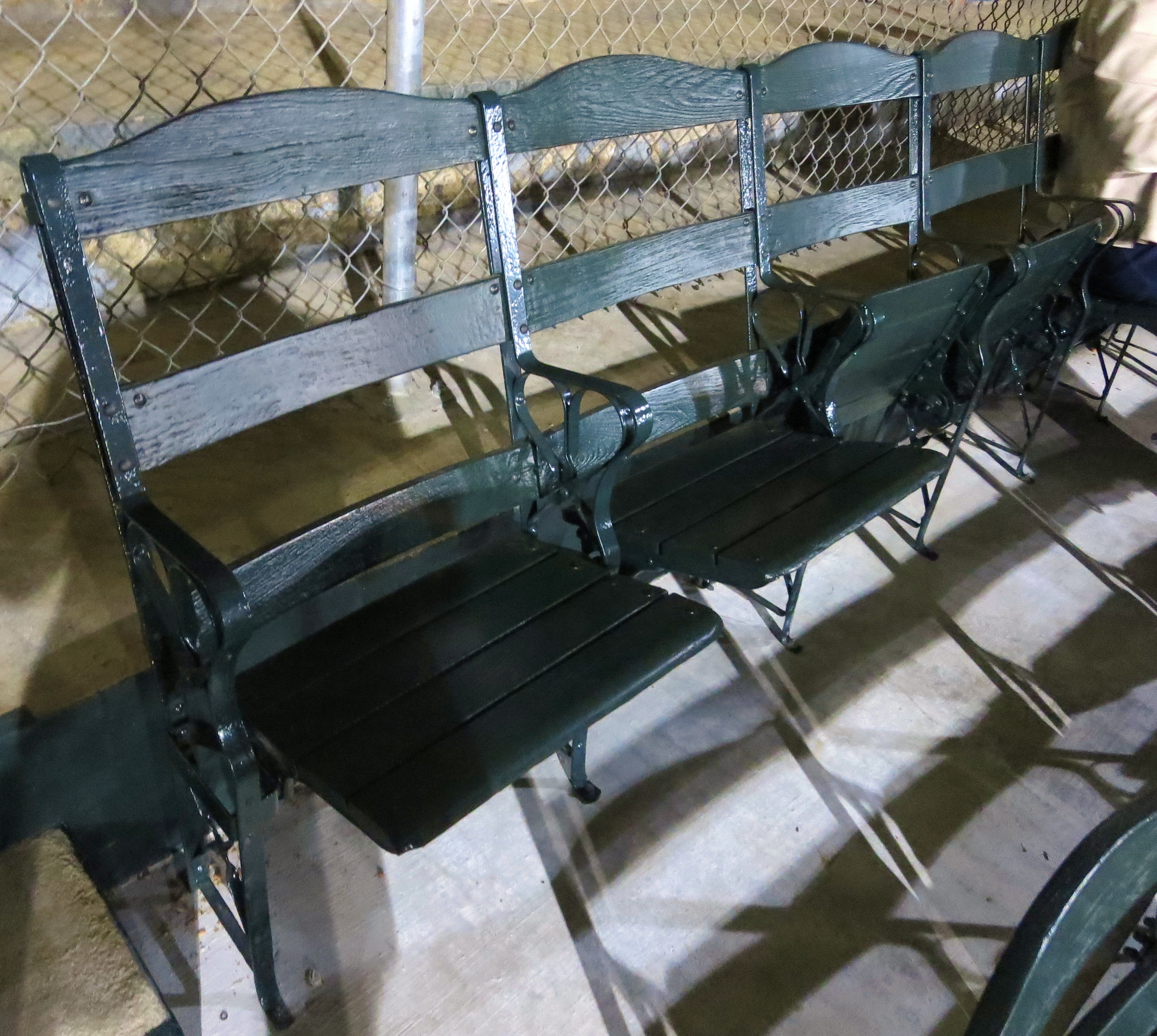
(2015) Shibe Park seats at Duncan Park Stadium

== The ballpark ==
The Spartanburg Peaches teams hosted home Tri-State League games at Duncan Park. The ballpark was listed on the National Register of Historic Places in 2016. The Duncan Park Stadium hosted its first game on July 8, 1926, when the minor league Spartanburg Spartans defeated the Macon Peaches by the score of 5-1.

In 1937, the New York Yankees, with six future members of the Baseball Hall of Fame: Lou Gehrig, Bill Dickey, Lefty Gomez, Tony Lazzeri, Red Ruffing and Joe DiMaggio, played an exhibition game at Duncan Park as the team was returning from their spring training. Negro league baseball teams played games Duncan Park, with Hank Aaron, Satchel Paige, Larry Doby, and Jackie Robinson playing in games at the ballpark. When Shibe Park in Philadelphia was demolished, Duncan Park received 582 seats from the old stadium.

The 102-acre Duncan Park was founded in 1926. Today, Duncan Park is still in use as a public park with the ballpark within. The park is located at 1000 Duncan Park Drive in Spartanburg, South Carolina.

== Timeline ==
Year(s)	# Yrs.	Team	Level	League	Affiliate	Ballpark
1946	1	Spartanburg Peaches	Class B	Tri-State League	St Louis Browns	Duncan Park
1947–1955	9	Spartanburg Peaches	Class B	Tri-State League	Cleveland Indians	Duncan Park

== Year–by–year records ==
Year	Record	Finish	Manager	Playoffs/Notes
1946	52–87	6th	Ed Dancisak	Did not qualify
1947	88–51	1st	Kerby Farrell	Won league pennant Lost in 1st round
1948	68–77	7th	Kerby Farrell	Did not qualify
1949	81–60	2nd	Kerby Farrell	Lost in finals
1950	80–63	3rd	Kerby Farrell	Lost in 1st round
1951	73–67	4th	Harry Griswold	Qualified for playoffs League champions
1952	83–55	3rd	Pinky May	Lost in finals
1953	96–54	1st	Jimmy Bloodworth	Won League pennant Lost in 1st round
1954	66–72	4th	Jimmy Bloodworth	Lost in 1st round
1955	74–44	1st	Spud Chandler	League champions

== Notable alumni ==
- Al Aber (1948–1949)
- Jimmy Bloodworth (1953–1954, MGR)
- Dick Brown (1954)
- Spud Chandler (1955, MGR) 4x MLB All-star
- Rocky Colavito (1952) Cleveland Guardians Hall of Fame
- Gordy Coleman (1954)
- Kerby Farrell (1947–1950, MGR)
- Jim Fridley (1949)
- Jerry Lynn (1946)
- Pinky May (1952, MGR) MLB All-star
- Pete Milne (1947)
- Billy Moran (1953)
- Dolan Nichols (1953)
- Dan Osinski (1955)
- Frankie Pack (1946)
- Ted Petoskey (1946)
- Stan Pitula (1951)
- Bill Upton (1952)
- Ken Wood (1946)
- George Zuverink (1948)
- Spartanburg Peaches players
