= Florence Steelers =

- 1948–1950; Florence, South Carolina

Minor league affiliations
- Class: Class B (1948–1950)
- League: Tri-State League (1948–1950)

Major league affiliations
- Team: None

Minor league titles
- League titles (1): 1949
- Conference titles (1): 1949

Team data
- Name: Florence Steelers (1948–1950)
- Ballpark: American Legion Stadium (1948–1950)

The Florence Steelers were a minor league baseball team based in Florence, South Carolina. From 1948 to 1950, the "Steelers" played as members of the Class B level Tri-State League, winning the 1949 league championship.

The Steelers hosted minor league home games at American Legion Stadium in Florence.

== History ==
Minor league baseball began in Florence, with the 1931 Florence "Pee Deans," who played as members of the Class D level Palmetto League, which folded after playing one partial season. Florence finished finishing 9.0 games behind the first place Augusta Wolves in the final standings with a 44–32 record.

On November 3, 1947, Florence was accepted into the Tri-State League. Former Cincinnati Red player Lee Gamble was initially named the manager and the American Legion Ballpark was to host the team. A team introduction dinner was held at the P and M Café (East Evans Street) in Florence. At the dinner, with C.M. Lewellyn, president of the Tri-State League in attendance, Florence general manager Ed Weingarten announced Lee Gamble had resigned and was being replaced. Gamble resigned because he would lose seniority with his Pennsylvania railroad job if he left the job to manage the Steelers. George Motto, an all-star player the season before with the Reidsville Luckies, was introduced as the Steelers' manager.

The Florence Steelers home business office was located in the building where the Hotel Florence is currently located, at 126 West Evans Street in Florence.

The Florence "Steelers" nickname corresponds to Florence being home to steel mills and manufacturing in the era.

In 1948, the Florence Steelers became members of the eight–team Class B level Tri–State League. The Steelers replaced the folded Reidsville Luckies franchise in the league. Florence joined the Anderson Rebels, Asheville Tourists, Charlotte Hornets, Fayetteville Cubs, Knoxville Smokies, Rock Hill Chiefs and Spartanburg Peaches teams in beginning Tri-State League play on April 15, 1948.

The Steelers' home–opener was on Friday, April 16, 1948, at American Legion Stadium. The McClenaghan High School band performed, and a first pitch was thrown out by Mayor James (Red) Maxwell in pre–game ceremonies. 2,591 were in attendance for the night game as the Steelers lost to Fayetteville Cubs by the score of 8–4. The Steelers defeated Fayetteville the next night 2–1, with 620 in attendance.

On June 12, 1948, the team was in last place with a record of 22–38, when George Motto was replaced as manager by James Martin.

In their first season of play, the Florence Steelers finished last in the Tri–State League regular season. The Steelers ended the 1948 season with a record of 50–95, placing eighth in the standings, with Motto and Martin serving as managers during the season. James Martin would remain manager for the remainder of the franchise. The Steelers finished 44.5 games behind the first place Asheville Tourists and did not qualify for the playoffs.

The 1949 Florence Steelers won both the Tri–State League regular season pennant and the league championship. Florence ended Tri–State League regular season with a record of 87–59, placing 1st and finishing 2.0 games ahead of the 2nd place Spartanburg Peaches as James Martin returned as manager. In the playoffs, Florence defeated the Rock Hill Chiefs 3 games to 2 and advanced. The Steelers won the championship by defeating the Spartanburg Peaches 4 games to 2 in the Finals.

Steeler pitcher Mel Fisher was named the Tri–State League Most Valuable player in 1949. Fisher won 31 total games: 27 in the regular season and 4 in the playoffs. Fisher threw 351 innings in the regular season, pitching in 55 games with 25 complete games.

Following their championship season of 1949, the Steelers' ownership announced the team was for sale. An effort by the citizens of Florence was organized to sell stock at $25.00 per share to purchase the team. Fred Martschink personally purchased the team in December 1949, before the local investor group raised enough capital to purchase the team from Martschink in February, 1950.

The 1950 season saw the franchise struggle financially and on August 31, 1950, the ownership group turned the franchise over to the league. The final game of the season was a home game that ended in a 10–2 win over the Sumter Chicks.

In their final season of play, the Steelers did not qualify for the 1950 Tri–State League playoffs. The Florence Steelers ended the 1950 Tri–State League regular season with a record of 63–83 to place seventh, finishing. 25.5 games behind the first place Knoxville Smokies. The Steelers scored 575 total runs, last in the league. Player/manager James Martin led the team with a .306 batting average.

Florence player/manager James Martin attended Furman University and was inducted into the Furman Athletics Hall of Fame in 1982.

The Florence Steelers folded following the 1950 season and were replaced by the Greenville Spinners in the 1951 Tri-State League.

Florence, South Carolina next hosted minor league baseball when the 1981 Florence Blue Jays began play as members of the South Atlantic League.

== The ballpark ==
The Florence Steelers hosted minor league home games at American Legion Stadium. The ballpark was located on Oakland Avenue. 1948 ticket prices were $0.85 for adults and $0.35 cents for children. Today, the site is named Iola Jones Park.

A replacement American Legion Field (Florence) was constructed in a new location in 1968 and housed minor league baseball with the Florence Blue Jays.

== Year–by–year records ==
Year	Record	Finish	Manager	Attend	Playoffs/Notes
1948	50–95	8th	George Motto / James Martin	72,569	Did not qualify
1949	87–59	1st	James Martin	60,124	Won pennant League champions
1950	63–83	7th	James Martin	34,991	Did not qualify

== Notable alumni ==
- Nate Andrews (1948)
- Connie Creeden (1948)
- Walt Dixon (1949)
- Lee Gamble (1948, MGR*)
- Preston Gómez (1948)
- Hank Gornicki (1948)
- Ed Lewinski (1950)
- Florence Steelers players
