= Palmetto League =

Class D level baseball league

- Classification: Class D (1931)
- Sport: Minor League Baseball
- First season: 1931
- Folded: July 23, 1931
- President: Charles H. Garrison (1931)
- No. of teams: 4
- Country: United States of America
- Most titles: 1 Augusta Wolves (1931)
- Related competitions: Georgia–Alabama League

The Palmetto League was a Class D level baseball minor league that played in 1931. The four–team Palmetto league had teams based in South Carolina and Georgia. The Palmetto League permanently folded midway through the 1931 season with the Augusta Wolves in first place.

== History ==
The Palmetto League formed for the 1931 season as a Class D level minor league. Under the direction of league president Charles H. Garrison, the Palmetto League began play as a four–team league, hosting franchises from Anderson, South Carolina (Anderson Electrics), Augusta, Georgia (Augusta Wolves), Florence, South Carolina (Florence Pee Deans) and Greenville, South Carolina (Greenville Spinners). The Palmetto League played a split–season schedule, with the winners of each portion meeting in a playoff final. After the first half of the season was completed, the Anderson Electricians moved to Spartanburg, South Carolina and played as the Spartanburg Spartans.

The Palmetto League's first season of play began on Monday, April 27, 1931. After the season began, Anderson (14–40) moved to Spartanburg on June 29, 1931, playing their first home game in Spartanburg on July 2, 1931. The Augusta Wolves won the first half of the season's split schedule.

On July 23, 1931, the Palmetto League folded with Augusta in first place of the second half standings. The Augusta Wolves led the final overall Palmetto League standings with a 53–23 record, finishing 9.0 games ahead of the second place Florence Pee Deans (44–32), followed by the Greenville Spinners (37–39) and the Anderson Electrics/Spartanburg Spartans (28–58) who finished 30.0 games behind. Notably, Bill McGhee of Augusta hit .405 for the season, to lead the league.

When the Palmetto League permanently folded on July 23, 1931, the league cited "financial difficulties" as the contributing factor.

== Palmetto League teams ==
Team name	City represented	Ballpark	Year(s) active
Anderson Electricians	Anderson, South Carolina	Unknown	1931
Augusta Wolves	Augusta, Georgia	Municipal Stadium	1931
Florence Pee Deans	Florence, South Carolina	Unknown	1931
Greenville Spinners	Greenville, South Carolina	Spinner's Park	1931
Spartanburg Spartans	Spartanburg, South Carolina	Duncan Park	1931

== Standings and statistics ==
1931 Palmetto League
Team standings	W	L	PCT	GB	Managers
Augusta Wolves	53	23	.697	–	Cat Milner
Florence Pee Deans	44	32	.579	9	Frank Walker / Carl East
Greenville Spinners	37	39	.487	16	Nelson Leach / Sherry Smith
Anderson Electrics / Spartanburg Spartans	28	58	.326	30	Joe Guyon/ Ken McNeill / Frank Walker

Anderson (14–10) moved to Spartanburg on June 29, 1931. First home game July 2, 1931.

Player statistics
Player	Team	Stat	Tot	Player	Team	Stat	Tot
Bill McGhee	Augusta	BA	.405	Jinx Harris	Augusta	W	17
Zachery Smith	Augusta	Runs	85	Jinx Harris	Augusta	SO	119
Bill McGhee	Augusta	Hits	133	Jim D. Ryan	Augusta	Pct	.846; 11–2
Bill McGhee	Augusta	RBI	73				
Charlie English	Florence	HR	11				
