= Mike Kelly (baseball, born 1896) =

- Catcher/Coach
- Born: May 1, 1896; Indianapolis, Indiana, U.S.
- Died: October 23, 1968 (aged 72); Indianapolis, Indiana, U.S.
- Batted: Right Threw: Right

Professional debut
- IL: 1916, for the St Mary's
- CL: 1917, for the South Bend/Peoria Benders/Distillers
- AA: 1918, for the Toledo

Last appearance
- 1929, for the Spartanburg Spartans

Teams
- St Mary's (1916) (IL); South Bend/Peoria Benders/Distillers (1917) (AA); Toledo (1918–1920) (SAL); Spartanburg Pioneers (1921) (SAL); Spartanburg Spartans (1922–1929) (SAL); As a coach in MLB: Chicago White Sox (1930–1931); Chicago Cubs (1934); Boston Bees (1938–1939); Pittsburgh Pirates (1940–1941)

Bernard Francis "Mike" Kelly (May 1, 1896 – October 23, 1968) was an American baseball player, coach and manager.

== Career ==
=== Player ===
Kelly made his playing debut in 1916 for St Mary's in the Interstate League. He played one season there before moving in 1917 to the Central League team South Bend/Peoria Benders/Distillers. He again lasted one year before moving to Toledo in the American Association. He played at Toledo until 1920.

=== Player/manager ===
In 1921, Kelly began his management career at the Spartanburg Pioneers while still a player. A year later, he continued with the renamed Spartanburg Spartans of the South Atlantic League and, between 1922 and 1929, played and managed the Spartans where he won a league championship in 1925.

=== Coach and manager ===
After retiring as a player, Kelly coached for the Chicago White Sox between 1930 and 1931.

In 1931 Kelly left the White Sox to coach the Newark Bears.

Kelly managed the Jersey City Skeeters in 1933.

In 1934, he moved to the Chicago Cubs where he was a coach.

Between 1936 and 1937, Kelly managed the Syracuse Chiefs.

He later coached with the Boston Braves and Pittsburgh Pirates.

In 1944, he managed the Indianapolis Indians in the American Association.

=== Scout ===
Between 1948 and 1950, he was a scout for the Pittsburgh Pirates.
