= Ed Lewinski =

American basketball and baseball player (1918–1962)

Personal information
- Born: September 10, 1918 Chicago, Illinois, U.S.
- Died: April 15, 1962 (aged 43) Chicago, Illinois, U.S.
- Listed height: 6 ft 4 in (1.93 m)
- Listed weight: 210 lb (95 kg)

Career information
- High school: Bowen (Chicago, Illinois)
- Position: Forward / center

Career history
- 1939–1941: Chicago Lindall Foundry
- 1946: Chicago American Gears
- 1946: Anderson Chiefs
- 1946–1947: Anderson Duffey Packers
- 1947–1949: Tri-Cities Blackhawks

Edmund B. Lewinski (September 10, 1918 – April 15, 1962) was an American professional basketball player. He played for the Chicago American Gears, Anderson Duffey Packers, and Tri-Cities Blackhawks in the National Basketball League and averaged 4.8 points per game. Due to the unique status of the first season of the Tri-Cities Blackhawks as a team, Lewinski would be one of nine players from the team's inaugural season to only play for the Blackhawks during that same season as opposed to either also or only playing for the Buffalo Bisons precursor team from 1946 as well.

Lewinski also played minor league baseball. He played for the following teams:

- 1946: Decatur Commodores and Winston-Salem Cardinals
- 1947: Houston Buffaloes and Omaha Cardinals
- 1948: Omaha Cardinals
- 1949: Miami Beach Flamingos
- 1950: Florence Steelers and Miami Beach Flamingos
- 1951: Augusta Tigers, Miami Beach Flamingos, and Lake Charles Lakers
