= Carolina Association =

Minor league baseball league

- Classification: Class D (1908–1912)
- Sport: Minor League Baseball
- First season: 1908
- Folded: 1912
- Replaced by: North Carolina State League
- President: George L. Hammond (1908); Joseph H. Wearn (1909–1912)
- No. of teams: 6
- Country: United States of America
- Most titles: 2 Greensboro Champs (1908) / Patriots (1909)

The Carolina Association was a minor league baseball league that played from 1908 to 1912. The Carolina Association played as a six–team Class D level league. The league consisted of teams based in North Carolina and South Carolina, with the same six franchises playing for the duration of the league.

== History ==
The Carolina Association began play as a six–team Class D level league in the 1908 season. The league president was George L. Hammond. The charter members were the Anderson Electricians of Anderson, South Carolina, Charlotte Hornets of Charlotte, North Carolina, Greensboro Champs of Greenville, South Carolina, Greenville Spinners of Greenville, South Carolina, Spartanburg Spartans of Spartanburg, South Carolina and Winston-Salem Twins of Winston-Salem, North Carolina. The same six franchises played for the duration of the league history. The Anderson Electrics name derived from a recently built hydro electric plant in Anderson.

In their first season of play, the 1908 Carolina Association played a regular season without playoffs, which continued throughout their existence. The 1908 final standings featured the Greensboro Champs (51–38), Spartanburg Spartans (49–39), Greenville Spinners (48–36), Winston-Salem Twins (41–48), Charlotte Hornets (40–47) and Anderson Electricians (32–53).

On May 9, 1908, Spartanburg turned a triple play against the Greensboro Champs.

A native of the Greenville, South Carolina area, Shoeless Joe Jackson played for the 1908 Greenville Spinners, hitting .346 to lead the Carolina Association. While earning a salary of $75.00 a month, Jackson also led the Carolina Association in hits (120) and RBI (72). In August, 1908, Jackson's contract was purchased by the Philadelphia Athletics for $900.00 and Jackson immediately made his major league debut. Today, there is a museum and monuments honoring Jackson in Greenville.

In 1909, Joseph H. Wearn became the Carolina Association president, a position he would hold for the remaining duration of the league. The 1909 Carolina Association final standings were won by for the second consecutive season by Greensboro. The Greensboro Patriots (65–44) were followed by the Anderson Electricians (63–48), Winston-Salem Twins (54–52), Greenville Spinners (61–51), Winston-Salem Twins (54–52) and Spartanburg Spartans (40–71).

The Greenville Spinners (63–40) were the 1910 Carolina Association Champions. Following Greenville in the standings were the Charlotte Hornets (56–50), Anderson Electricians (56–54), Winston-Salem Twins (51–57), Spartanburg Spartans (50–57) and Greensboro Champs (46–64).

In the 1911 Carolina Association, the Winston-Salem Twins (72–37) won the championship. The Greensboro Patriots (66–43), Charlotte Hornets (52–58), Anderson Electricians (48–59), Spartanburg Spartans (44–63) and Greenville Spinners (42–64) rounded out the 1911 final standings.

In their final season of play, the 1912 Carolina Association champions were the Anderson Electricians (66–44). Anderson was followed by the Winston-Salem Twins (63–47), Charlotte Hornets (61–46), Spartanburg Red Sox (54–55), Greensboro Patriots (51–59) and Greenville Spinners (34–78).

After the 1912 season, the Carolina Association evolved into the 1913 Class D level North Carolina State League. Joseph H. Wearn continued as president of the newly named league. The three North Carolina franchises continued play in the North Carolina State League without the three South Carolina franchises.

== Carolina Association teams ==
Team name(s)	City represented	Ballpark	Year(s) active
Anderson Electricians	Anderson, South Carolina	Unknown	1908 to 1912
Charlotte Hornets	Charlotte, North Carolina	Latta Park Baseball Field	1908 to 1912
Greensboro Champs (1908)/ Greensboro Patriots (1909–1912)	Greensboro, North Carolina	Cone Park	1908 to 1912
Greenville Spinners	Greenville, South Carolina	Furman Park	1908 to 1912
Spartanburg Spartans (1908–1911)/ Spartanburg Red Sox (1912)	Spartanburg, South Carolina	Unknown	1908 to 1912
Winston-Salem Twins	Winston-Salem, North Carolina	Prince Albert Park	1908 to 1912

== Standings & statistics ==
The Carolina Association had no playoffs. The regular season first place team was the league champion.

=== 1908 Carolina Association ===
Team name	W	L	PCT	GB	Managers
Greensboro Champs	51	38	.573	–	James McKevitt
Greenville Spinners	48	36	.571	½	Tom Stouch
Spartanburg Spartans	49	39	.557	1½	Carlton Buesse
Winston-Salem Twins	41	48	.461	10	Robert Carter
Charlotte Hornets	40	47	.460	10	Jess Reynolds / Philip Hinton / Danny Collins
Anderson Electricians	32	53	.376	17	Elmer Hines / Sam Woodward

No Playoffs.

Player statistics
Player	Team	Stat	Tot	Player	Team	Stat	Tot
Shoeless Joe Jackson	Greenville	BA	.346	Walt Hammersley	Greensboro	W	22
Shoeless Joe Jackson	Greenville	Hits	120	Phifer Fullenwider	Charlotte	Pct	.765; 13–4
Shoeless Joe Jackson	Greenville	RBI	72	Alvin Barre	Greenville	Runs	62

=== 1909 Carolina Association ===
Team name	W	L	PCT	GB	Managers
Greensboro Patriots	65	44	.596	–	James McKevitt
Anderson Electricians	63	48	.568	3	James Kelly
Greenville Spinners	61	51	.545	5½	Tom Stouch
Winston-Salem Twins	54	52	.509	9½	Robert Carter
Charlotte Hornets	46	63	.422	19	Dan Collins / Lave Cross
Spartanburg Spartans	40	71	.360	26	Carlton Beusse

No Playoffs.

Player statistics
Player	Team	Stat	Tot	Player	Team	Stat	Tot
Al Humphrey	Charlotte	BA	.296	Roxy Walters	Greensboro	W	25
James Kelly	Anderson	Hits	117	Roxy Walters	Greensboro	SO	148
James Kelly	Anderson	RBI	71	George Schmick	Anderson	Pct	.789: 15–4
Harvey Ritter	Spartanburg	HR	11	Charles Sisson	Greensboro	Runs	81

=== 1910 Carolina Association ===
schedule

Team name	W	L	PCT	GB	Managers
Greenville Spinners	63	40	.612	–	Tom Stouch
Charlotte Hornets	56	50	.528	8½	Lave Cross
Anderson Electricians	56	54	.509	10½	James Kelly
Winston-Salem Twins	51	57	.472	14½	James McKivettt
Spartanburg Spartans	50	57	.467	15	Andy Roth / Bob Wood
Greensboro Champs	46	64	.418	20½	Carlton Beusse / Pug Hicks

No Playoffs:

Player statistics
Player	Team	Stat	Tot	Player	Team	Stat	Tot
James Kelly	Anderson	BA	.325	Jim Redfern	Spartanburg	W	21
James Kelly	Anderson	Hits	132	O.W. Brazille	Charlotte	W	21
James Kelly	Anderson	RBI	66	Bert Gardin	Spartanburg	Pct	.750: 15–5
Red Smith	Anderson	HR	4	George Bausewine	Charlotte	SO	192

=== 1911 Carolina Association ===
Team name	W	L	PCT	GB	Managers
Winston-Salem Twins	72	37	.661	–	Charles Clancy
Greensboro Patriots	66	43	.581	6	Frank Doyle
Charlotte Hornets	52	58	.473	20½	Lave Cross / Jack Agnew
Anderson Electricians	48	59	.449	23	James Kelly
Spartanburg Spartans	44	63	.411	27	Bill Laval
Greenville Spinners	42	64	.396	28½	Tom Stouch

No Playoffs.

Player statistics
Player	Team	Stat	Tot	Player	Team	Stat	Tot
F.P. Wofford	Charlotte	BA	.392	Josh Swindell	Winston–Salem	W	29
Bill Schumaker	WWinston–Salem	Hits	145	Josh Swindell	Winston–Salem	Pct	.784; 29–8
Bill Schumaker	Winston–Salem	RBI	91	Walt Rickard	Greensboro	Runs	105
Red Smith	Greenville	HR	17				

=== 1912 Carolina Association ===
schedule

Team name	W	L	PCT	GB	Managers
Anderson Electricians	66	44	.600	–	George Ramsey
Winston-Salem Twins	63	47	.573	3	Charles Clancy
Charlotte Hornets	61	46	.570	3½	Champ Osteen
Spartanburg Red Sox	54	55	.495	11½	Bill Laval
Greensboro Patriots	51	59	.464	15	Frank Doyle
Greenville Spinners	34	78	.304	33	Tom Stouch / Glenn Colby

No Playoffs:

Player statistics
Player	Team	Stat	Tot	Player	Team	Stat	Tot
Ralph Young	Greensboro	BA	.326	Pete Boyle	Winston–Salem	W	16
Bill Schumaker	Winston–Salem	Hits	125	Pete Boyle	Winston–Salem	Pct	.762; 16–5
Bill Schumaker	Winston–Salem	RBI	106	Paul Fittery	Anderson	SO	191
Bill Schumaker	Winston–Salem	HR	16	Bill Schumaker	Winston–Salem	Runs	73
