= Jimmy Bloodworth =

American baseball player (1917–2002)

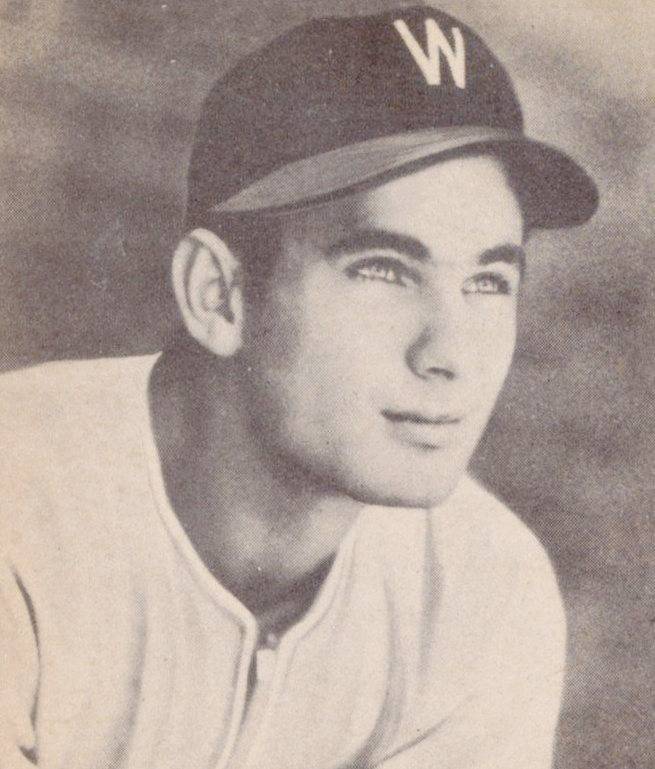
- Second baseman
- Born: July 26, 1917; Tallahassee, Florida, U.S.
- Died: August 17, 2002 (aged 85); Apalachicola, Florida, U.S.
- Batted: Right Threw: Right

MLB debut
- September 14, 1937, for the Washington Senators

Last MLB appearance
- August 19, 1951, for the Philadelphia Phillies

MLB statistics
- Batting average: .248
- Home runs: 62
- Runs batted in: 451
- Stats at Baseball Reference

Teams
- Washington Senators (1937, 1939–1941); Detroit Tigers (1942–1943, 1946); Pittsburgh Pirates (1947); Cincinnati Reds (1949–1950); Philadelphia Phillies (1950–1951)

James Henry Bloodworth (July 26, 1917 – August 17, 2002) was an American professional baseball second baseman who played in Major League Baseball (MLB) for the Washington Senators (1937 and 1939–41), Detroit Tigers (1942–43 and 1946), Pittsburgh Pirates (1947), Cincinnati Reds (1949–50), and Philadelphia Phillies (1950–51).

== Early life ==
Bloodworth was born in Tallahassee, Florida, and he grew up in Apalachicola. Bloodworth said that he strengthened his upper body as a youth by pulling boats across Apalachicola Bay. He played local baseball with an adult team. He was 17 when he started his minor-league career with affiliates of the Washington Senators.

== Career ==
Bloodworth made his major-league debut in 1937 and began to play regularly in 1939. In 1941, Bloodworth led AL second basemen in putouts and assists. That December, he was traded to the Detroit Tigers. He led the American League in grounding into double plays (29) in 1943. He served in the Florida Army National Guard. He missed the entire 1944 and 1945 seasons due to his military service, returning to the Tigers in 1946.

Bloodworth was traded to the Pirates in December 1946 and to the Dodgers about a year later. He was traded to the Reds in 1948 before being purchased by the Phillies in 1950. He was on the 1950 Phillies team that won the 1950 NL pennant. He played in one game in the 1950 World Series; as a ninth-inning defensive replacement, he did not get any plate appearances.

Bloodworth's last major-league season was with the 1951 Phillies. In 11 seasons, he played in 1,002 games and had a .248 batting average over 3,519 at bats with 62 home runs and 451 RBI. Bloodworth returned to the minor leagues, where he had stints as a player and player-manager for teams in Cedar Rapids and Spartanburg with the Spartanburg Peaches.

== Later life ==
Bloodworth, who lived in Apalachicola during the baseball offseasons, continued to live there after his baseball career. He began to experience heart failure in the late 1970s. He died in 2002.
