= Everett Springs, Georgia =

Unincorporated community in Georgia, U.S.

Coordinates: 34°29′41″N 85°06′50″W

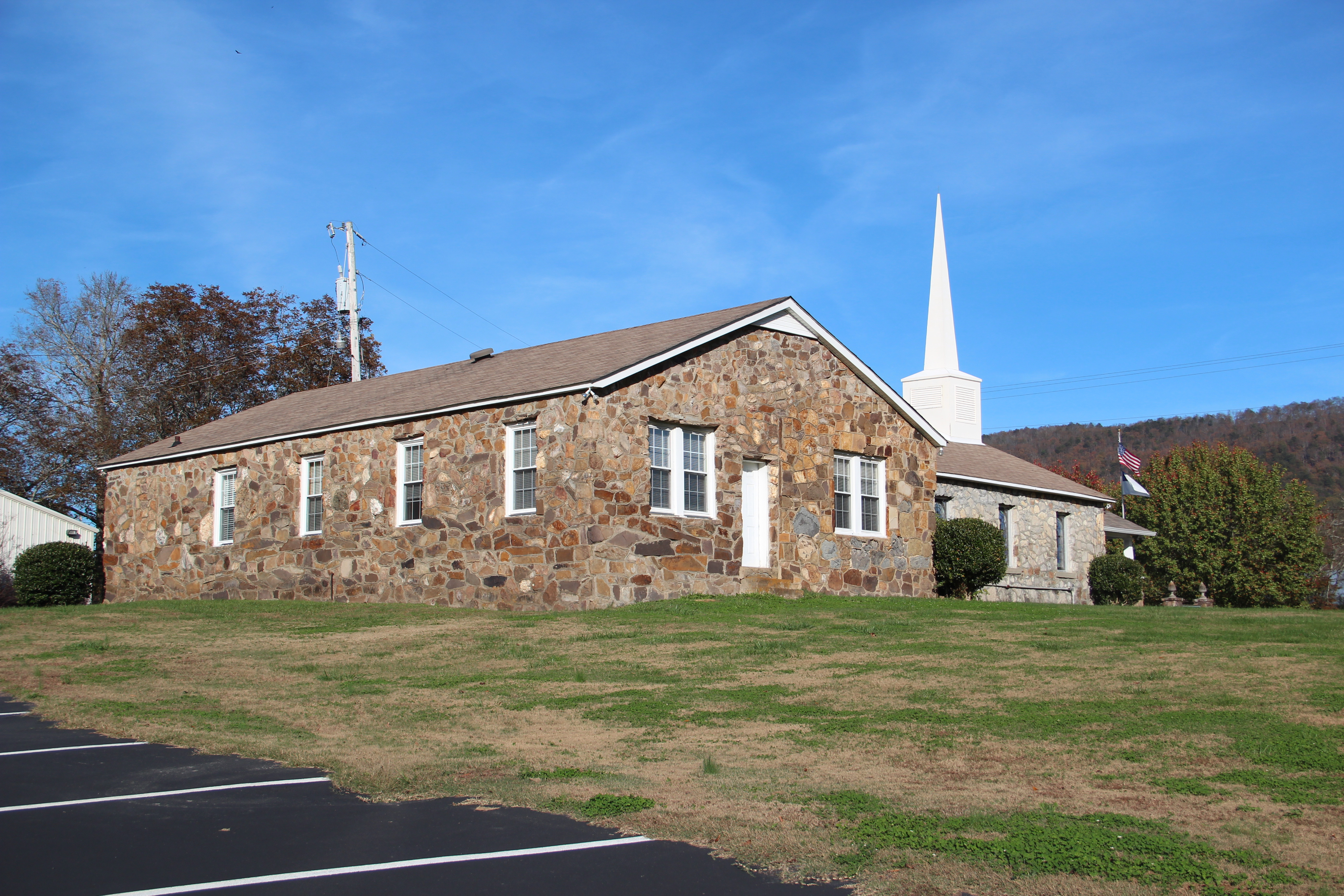
Everett Springs Baptist Church

Everett Springs is an unincorporated community in Floyd County, in the U.S. state of Georgia.

== History ==
A post office called Everett Springs was established in 1851, and remained in operation until it was discontinued in 1906. Elkanan Everett, a pioneer settler, gave the community its name.

== Notable people ==
- Parson Perryman, baseball player, born in Everett Springs
