= Parson Perryman =

American baseball player (1888-1966)

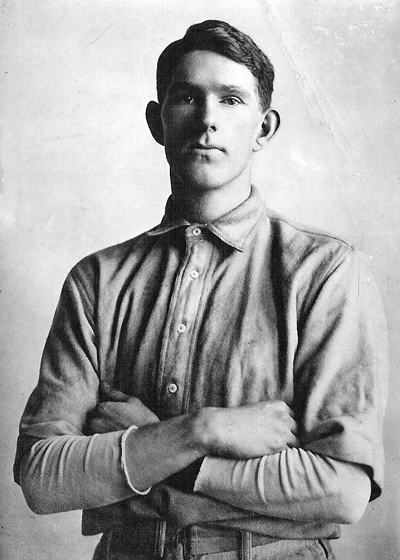
- Pitcher
- Born: October 24, 1888; Everett Springs, Georgia, U.S.
- Died: September 12, 1966 (aged 77); Starke, Florida, U.S.
- Batted: Right Threw: Right

MLB debut
- April 14, 1915, for the St. Louis Browns

Last MLB appearance
- July 13, 1915, for the St. Louis Browns

MLB statistics
- Win–loss record: 2–4
- Strikeouts: 19
- Earned run average: 3.93
- Stats at Baseball Reference

Teams
- St. Louis Browns (1915)

Emmett Key "Parson" Perryman (October 24, 1888 – September 12, 1966) was an American professional baseball player. He was a right-handed pitcher for one season (1915) with the St. Louis Browns, during which he compiled a 2-4 record, with a 3.93 earned run average, and 19 strikeouts in 50⅓ innings pitched.

An alumnus of Emory University (1913) when it was located in Oxford, Georgia, he was born in Everett Springs, Georgia and died in Starke, Florida at the age of 77. He was inducted into the Emory University Sports Hall of Fame in 1997.
