= Leon Pettit =

American baseball player (1902-1974)

- Pitcher
- Born: June 23, 1902; Waynesburg, Pennsylvania, U.S.
- Died: November 21, 1974 (aged 72); Columbia, Tennessee, U.S.
- Batted: Left Threw: Left

MLB debut
- April 18, 1935, for the Washington Senators

Last MLB appearance
- June 8, 1937, for the Philadelphia Phillies

MLB statistics
- Win–loss record: 8–6
- Earned run average: 5.18
- Strikeouts: 45
- Stats at Baseball Reference

Teams
- Washington Senators (1935); Philadelphia Phillies (1937)

Leon Arthur Pettit (June 23, 1902 – November 21, 1974) was an American pitcher in Major League Baseball. He played for the Washington Senators and Philadelphia Phillies.
