= Thomas Robertson (baseball) =

Thomas Griffin Robertson
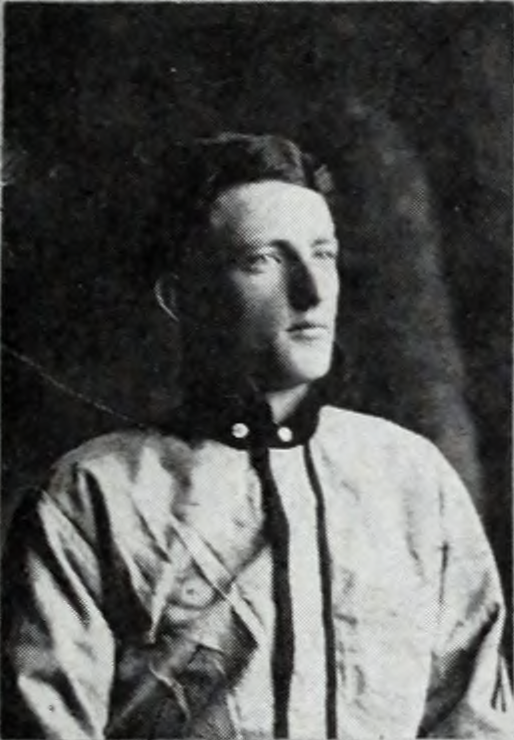
- Robertson in 1914

Biographical details
- Born: September 12, 1887; Clinton, South Carolina, U.S.
- Died: 1947 (aged 59–60)

Playing career
- 1905–1907: Clemson
- 1907: Spartanburg Spartans
- 1908: Roanoke Tigers
- 1908: Rock Hill Catawbas
- 1909: Roanoke Tigers
- Positions: 2B, SS, P, OF

Coaching career (HC unless noted)
- 1914: Clemson

Head coaching record
- Overall: 16–6

Thomas Griffin Robertson (September 12, 1887 – 1947) was an American merchant and baseball player and coach. Born in Clinton, South Carolina, Robertson attended Clemson College (now University). He played on the baseball team from 1905 through 1907, playing second base, shortstop, and pitcher. Robertson played minor league baseball from 1907 through 1909 for teams in the South Carolina and Virginia Leagues. He returned to Clemson to coach the team in 1914, leading the squad to a 16–6 record.
