= Bill McGhee =

American baseball player (1905-1984)

- First baseman / Outfielder
- Born: September 5, 1905; Shawmut, Alabama, U.S.
- Died: March 10, 1984 (aged 78); Decatur, Georgia, U.S.
- Batted: Left Threw: Left

MLB debut
- July 5, 1944, for the Philadelphia Athletics

Last MLB appearance
- September 16, 1945, for the Philadelphia Athletics

MLB statistics
- Batting average: .272
- Home runs: 1
- Runs batted in: 38
- Stats at Baseball Reference

Teams
- Philadelphia Athletics (1944–1945)

William Mac McGhee (September 5, 1905 – March 10, 1984), nicknamed "Fibber", was an American Major League Baseball (MLB) first baseman and outfielder who played for the Philadelphia Athletics during the 1944 and 1945 seasons.
