= John McMakin (baseball) =

American baseball player (1878-1956)

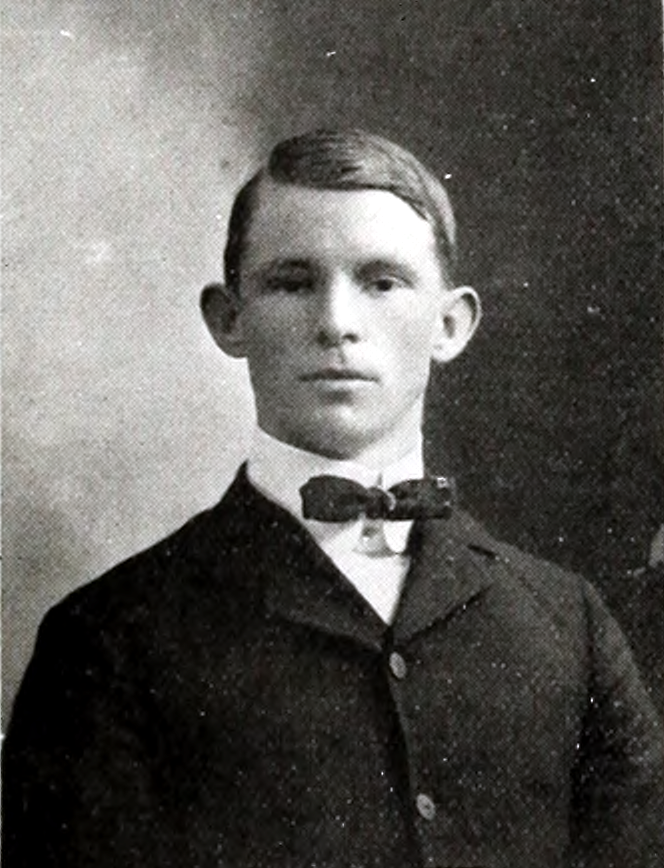
- Pitcher
- Born: March 6, 1878; Spartanburg, South Carolina, U.S.
- Died: September 25, 1956 (aged 78); Lyman, South Carolina, U.S.
- Batted: Right Threw: Left

MLB debut
- April 19, 1902, for the Brooklyn Superbas

Last MLB appearance
- May 31, 1902, for the Brooklyn Superbas

MLB statistics
- Win–loss record: 2–2
- Earned run average: 3.09
- Strikeouts: 6
- Stats at Baseball Reference

Teams
- Brooklyn Superbas (1902)

John Weaver McMakin (March 6, 1878 – September 25, 1956), nicknamed "Spartanburg John", was an American left-handed pitcher. McMakin played for the 1900 and 1901 Clemson Tigers. In Major League Baseball, he pitched in four games for the Brooklyn Superbas during the 1902 season, accumulating a record of 2-2 with a 3.09 earned run average. McMakin returned to Clemson to coach the team in the 1904 through 1906 seasons. Born in Spartanburg, South Carolina, he died at age 78 at his home near Lyman, South Carolina.

His grandsons, John McMakin and David McMakin, both became football players, with John going on to win Super Bowl IX with the Pittsburgh Steelers and David winning the 1973 College Football National Championship with the Alabama Crimson Tide.
