= Bob Wood (baseball) =

American baseball player (1865–1943)

- Wood with the Detroit Tigers in 1905
- Catcher
- Born: July 28, 1865; Glasgow, Scotland
- Died: May 22, 1943 (aged 77); Youngstown, Ohio, U.S.
- Batted: Right Threw: Right

MLB debut
- May 2, 1898, for the Cincinnati Reds

Last MLB appearance
- May 6, 1905, for the Detroit Tigers

MLB statistics
- Batting average: .281
- Home runs: 2
- Runs batted in: 168
- Stats at Baseball Reference

Teams
- Cincinnati Reds (1898–1900); Cleveland Blues/Bronchos (1901–1902); Detroit Tigers (1904–1905)

Robert Lynn Wood (July 28, 1865 – May 22, 1943) was a Scottish born professional baseball player. He played all or part of seven seasons in Major League Baseball, three with the Cincinnati Reds (1898–1900), and two each with the Cleveland Blues/Bronchos (1901–1902) and Detroit Tigers (1904–1905).

== Early years ==
Wood was born in 1865 at Glasgow, Scotland. He moved with his parents to the United States at age eight and was raised in Youngstown, Ohio.

== Baseball career ==
Wood began his professional baseball career with the Indianapolis Hoosiers of the Western League in 1895 at age 26. He remained with Indianapolis for three years.

Wood made his major-league debut in 1898 for the Cincinnati Reds. He played three years for the Reds from 1898 to 1900. In 1899, he hit .313 with a .404 on-base percentage with the Reds.

Wood jumped to the American League in 1900, appearing in 36 games for the Chicago Whitestockings. When the American League reached major-league status in 1901, Wood joined the Cleveland Blues. He spent the 1901 and 1902 seasons with Cleveland.

Wood spent the 1903 season with the Milwaukee Brewers of the American Association. He hit .324 in 121 games for Milwaukee.

Wood returned to the American League in 1904, appearing in 49 games for the Detroit Tigers. In 1905, he appeared in only eight games for the Tigers. His batting average collapsed in 1905 with only two hits in 24 at bats. He was sold to Buffalo in May 1905.

Wood concluded his playing career for Buffalo in 1905 and 1906, Toronto in 1906 and 1907, and Little Rock in 1907 and 1908.

He played the majority of his major league career (290 out of 382 games) as a catcher. Over his entire major league career, he had a .281 batting average with two home runs, 168 RBI and a .338 on-base percentage.

== Later years ==
During his time as a baseball player, Wood also owned two farms in Ohio.

Wood died at his home in Youngstown, Ohio, in May 1943.
