= Anderson Rebels =

- 1946–1954; Anderson, South Carolina

Minor league affiliations
- Previous classes: Class B
- League: Tri-State League

Major league affiliations
- Previous teams: New York Giants (1946); Pittsburgh Pirates (1948); St. Louis Browns (1951–1953); Baltimore Orioles (1954)

Team data
- Previous names: Anderson Electricians (1907–1912, 1931); Anderson A's (1946)
- Previous parks: Nardin Field

The Anderson Rebels were a minor league baseball club that existed between 1946 and 1954. The team, based in Anderson, South Carolina, was a member of the class-B Tri-State League. In 1946, the team was initially established as the Anderson A's and were affiliated with the New York Giants. The next season the club became an independent and was renamed the Anderson Rebels. The team later became affiliated with the Pittsburgh Pirates, St. Louis Browns and Baltimore Orioles before disbanding in 1954.

The Anderson Rebels and Anderson A's were preceded in Anderson by the Anderson Electricians who played as members of the South Carolina League (1907), Carolina Association (1908–1912) and Palmetto League (1931).

== Year-by-year records ==
Year	Record	Finish	Manager	Playoffs
1946	59-81	4th (t)	Ray Green	
1947	84-55	2nd	Bob Richards	Won in 1st Round vs. Knoxville Smokies (4-2); Lost League Finals vs. Charlotte Hornets (4-3)
1948	77-68	2nd	Bob Richards	Lost in 1st round vs. Fayetteville Cubs (3-1)
1949	62-83	8th	Bob Richards	
1950	65-79	6th	Bob Richards	
1951	59-80	6th	Len Schulte / Hillis Layne	
1952	67-72	4th	George Hausmann	Lost in 1st round vs. Charlotte Hornets (3-1)
1953	75-74	4th	Hillis Layne	Won in 1st round vs. Asheville Tourists (3-1); Lost League Finals vs. Charlotte Hornets (3-0)
1954	61-79	6th	Virgil Stallcup / Fred Boiko / Robert Knoke / Fred Boiko	
