= Greenville Spinners =

- 1907–1962; (1907–1912, 1919–1931, 1938–1942, 1946–1952, 1954–1955, 1961–1962); Greenville, South Carolina

Minor league affiliations
- Previous classes: Class A (1961–1962); Class B (1951–1955); Class A (1946–1950); Class B (1938–1942); Class D (1931); Class B (1921–1930); Class C (1919–1920); Class D (1907–1912)
- League: South Atlantic League (1961–1962)
- Previous leagues: Tri-State League (1951–1955); South Atlantic League (1938–1950); Palmetto League (1931); South Atlantic League (1919–1930); Carolina Association (1908–1912); South Carolina League (1907)

Major league affiliations
- Previous teams: Brooklyn/Los Angeles Dodgers (1947–1950, 1961–1962); Chicago White Sox (1946); Washington Senators (1939–1941)

Minor league titles
- League titles: 5 (1910, 1926, 1927, 1930, 1948)

Team data
- Previous names: Greenville Spinners (1908–1912, 1919–1931, 1938–1942, 1946–1955, 1961–1962); Greenville Edistoes (1907)
- Previous parks: Meadowbrook Park

The Greenville Spinners was a primary name of the minor league baseball teams located in Greenville, South Carolina between 1907 and 1962. Greenville teams played as members of the South Carolina League in 1907, Carolina Association (1908–1912), the South Atlantic League (1919–1930, 1946–1950 and 1961–1962), the Palmetto League in 1931, and the Tri-State League (1954–1955).

Greenville was an affiliate of the Washington Senators (1939–1941), Chicago White Sox (1946), Brooklyn Dodgers (1947–1950) and Los Angeles Dodgers (1961–1962).

Baseball Hall of Fame member Tommy Lasorda (1949) and Greenville native Shoeless Joe Jackson (1908) were both on the roster of the Spinners for one season each.

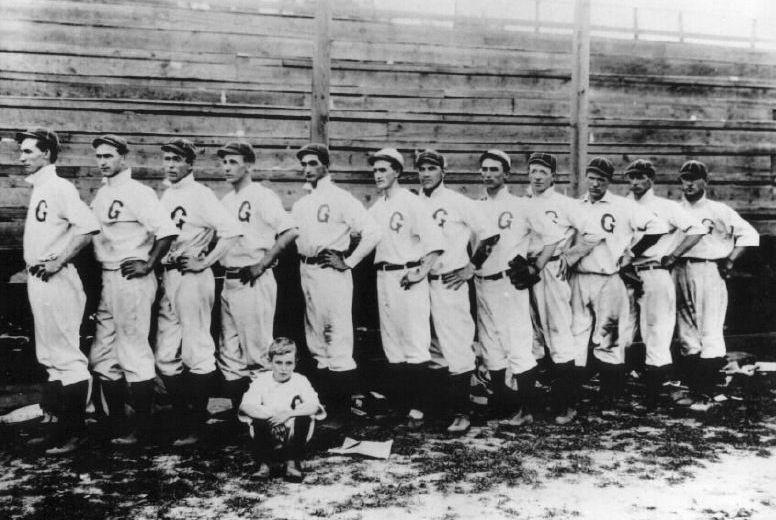
24 1908 Greenville Spinners Baseball Team

== Greenville Spinners ==
A native of the Greenville, South Carolina area, Shoeless Joe Jackson played for the 1908 Greenville Spinners. Jackson hit .346 to lead the Carolina Association, while earning a salary of $75.00 a month. In August, 1908, Jackson's contract was purchased by the Connie Mack of the Philadelphia Athletics for $900.00. Jackson immediately reported to the Athletics and made his major league debut. Today, there is a museum and numerous locales honoring Jackson in Greenville.

Tommy Lasorda pitched for the Greenville Spinners in 1949 at age 21. Lasorda compiled a 7–7 record and a 2.93 ERA with 138 walks and 158 strikeouts in 178 innings for the Brooklyn Dodgers affiliate.

== Notable alumni ==
- Tommy Lasorda (1949) Inducted Baseball Hall of Fame, 1997
- Rocky Bridges (1948) MLB All-Star
- Como Cotelle (1940)
- Oscar Grimes (1950) MLB All-Star
- Clem Labine (1947) 2 x MLB All-Star
- Pepper Martin (1947) 4 x MLB All-Star
- Ray Moore (1948)
- Sherry Robertson (1941)
- Mickey Vernon (1938) 7 x MLB All Star; 2 x NL Batting Title (1946, 1953)
- Dixie Walker (1930) 5 x MLB All-Star; 1944 NL Batting Title
- Harry Walker (1938) 2 x MLB All-Star; 1947 NL Batting Title
- Tillie Walker (1928–1929) 1918 Al Home Run Leader

== See also ==
Greenville Spinners players
