= 1955 South Atlantic League season =

- League: South Atlantic League
- Sport: Baseball
- Duration: April 12 – August 31
- Number of games: 140
- Number of teams: 8

Regular season
- League champions: Columbia Reds

Playoffs
- League champions: Augusta Tigers
- Runners-up: Montgomery Rebels

SAL seasons
- ← 1954 1956 →

The 1955 South Atlantic League was a Class A baseball season played between April 12 and August 31. Eight teams played a 140-game schedule, with the top four teams qualifying for the playoffs.

The Augusta Tigers won the South Atlantic League championship, defeating the Montgomery Rebels in the final round of the playoffs.

== Team changes ==
- The Augusta Rams begin an affiliation with the Detroit Tigers. The club is renamed to the Augusta Tigers.
- The Montgomery Rebels begin an affiliation with the Boston Red Sox.

== Teams ==
1955 South Atlantic League
Team	City	MLB Affiliate	Stadium
Augusta Tigers	Augusta, Georgia	Detroit Tigers	Jennings Stadium
Charlotte Hornets	Charlotte, North Carolina	Washington Senators	Clark Griffith Park
Columbia Reds	Columbia, South Carolina	Cincinnati Redlegs	Capital City Stadium
Columbus Cardinals	Columbus, Georgia	St. Louis Cardinals	Golden Park
Jacksonville Braves	Jacksonville, Florida	Milwaukee Braves	Jacksonville Baseball Park
Macon Peaches	Macon, Georgia	Chicago Cubs	Luther Williams Field
Montgomery Rebels	Montgomery, Alabama	Boston Red Sox	Municipal Field
Savannah Athletics	Savannah, Georgia	Kansas City Athletics	Grayson Stadium

== Map of teams ==
South Atlantic League teams

== Regular season ==
=== Summary ===
- The Columbia Reds finish the season with the best record for the first time since 1952.

=== Standings ===
South Atlantic League
Team	Win	Loss	%	GB
Columbia Reds	89	51	.636	–
Jacksonville Braves	79	61	.564	10
Augusta Tigers	76	64	.543	13
Montgomery Rebels	75	64	.540	13.5
Macon Peaches	67	73	.479	22
Savannah Athletics	61	79	.436	28
Columbus Cardinals	58	81	.417	30.5
Charlotte Hornets	54	86	.386	35

== League Leaders ==
=== Batting leaders ===
Stat	Player	Total
AVG	Marvin Williams, Columbia Reds	.328
H	George Toepfer, Montgomery Rebels	180
R	Ultus Alvarez, Columbia Reds	102
2B	Ultus Alvarez, Columbia Reds	35
3B	Bobo Osborne, Augusta Tigers	17
HR	Tommy Giordano, Savannah Athletics; Horace Garner, Jacksonville Braves; Tom Sarna, Augusta Tigers	18
RBI	Bobo Osborne, Augusta Tigers; William Thompson, Columbia Reds	94
SB	Sammy Drake, Macon Peaches	24

=== Pitching leaders ===
Stat	Player	Total
W	Charlie Rabe, Columbia Reds	21
ERA	Gus Keriazakos, Savannah Athletics	1.67
CG	Webbo Clarke, Charlotte Hornets; Charlie Rabe, Columbia Reds	23
SHO	Charlie Rabe, Columbia Reds	6
IP	Webbo Clarke, Charlotte Hornets	262.0
SO	Charlie Rabe, Columbia Reds	219

== Playoffs ==
- The semi-finals were reduced to a one-game series.
- The finals were reduced to a best-of-three series.
- The Augusta Tigers won their fifth South Atlantic League championship, defeating the Montgomery Rebels in three games.

=== Playoff bracket ===
Semi-finals
1	Columbia	0
3	Augusta	1
2	Jacksonville	0
4	Montgomery	1

Finals
3	Augusta	2
4	Jacksonville	1

== See also ==
- 1955 Major League Baseball season
