= 1949 South Atlantic League season =

- League: South Atlantic League
- Sport: Baseball
- Duration: April 18 – September 14
- Number of games: 154
- Number of teams: 8

Regular season
- League champions: Macon Peaches

Playoffs
- League champions: Macon Peaches
- Runners-up: Greenville Spinners

SAL seasons
- ← 1948 1950 →

The 1949 South Atlantic League was a Class A baseball season played between April 18 and September 14. Eight teams played a 154-game schedule, with the top four teams qualifying for the playoffs.

The Macon Peaches won the South Atlantic League championship, defeating the Greenville Spinners in the final round of the playoffs.

== Team changes ==
- The Charleston Rebels began an affiliation with the Chicago White Sox.

== Teams ==
1949 South Atlantic League
Team	City	MLB Affiliate	Stadium
Augusta Tigers	Augusta, Georgia	New York Yankees	Municipal Stadium
Charleston Rebels	Charleston, South Carolina	Chicago White Sox	College Park
Columbia Reds	Columbia, South Carolina	Cincinnati Reds	Capital City Stadium
Columbus Cardinals	Columbus, Georgia	St. Louis Cardinals	Golden Park
Greenville Spinners	Greenville, South Carolina	Brooklyn Dodgers	Meadowbrook Park
Jacksonville Tars	Jacksonville, Florida	New York Giants	Durkee Field
Macon Peaches	Macon, Georgia	Chicago Cubs	Luther Williams Field
Savannah Indians	Savannah, Georgia	Philadelphia Athletics	Grayson Stadium

== Map of teams ==
South Atlantic League teams

== Regular season ==
=== Summary ===
- The Macon Peaches finish the season with the best record for the first time since the 1941 season.

=== Standings ===
South Atlantic League
Team	Win	Loss	%	GB
Macon Peaches	96	58	.623	–
Savannah Indians	84	68	.553	11
Greenville Spinners	82	72	.532	14
Columbus Cardinals	80	73	.523	15.5
Jacksonville Tars	73	81	.474	23
Augusta Tigers	69	83	.454	26
Charleston Rebels	68	83	.450	26.5
Columbia Reds	59	93	.388	36

== League Leaders ==
=== Batting leaders ===
Stat	Player	Total
AVG	Bill Lutes, Jacksonville Tars	.313
H	Gene Faszholz, Columbus Cardinals	179
R	Gene Faszholz, Columbus Cardinals	109
2B	Bill Lutes, Jacksonville Tars	37
3B	Frederick Postolese, Greenville Spinners	16
HR	Ray Cash, Macon Peaches	19
RBI	Roy Peterson, Macon Peaches	100
SB	Maynard DeWitt, Greenville Spinners	48

=== Pitching leaders ===
Stat	Player	Total
W	Jim Atchley, Macon Peaches; Alfred Burch, Savannah Indians; Jack Faszholz, Columbus Cardinals; Bob Spicer, Macon Peaches	20
ERA	Sandy Silverstein, Savannah Indians	2.10
CG	Bob Spicer, Macon Peaches	23
SHO	Alfred Burch, Savannah Indians	6
IP	Jack Faszholz, Columbus Cardinals	254.0
SO	Ray Moore, Greenville Spinners	229

== Playoffs ==
- The Macon Peaches won their sixth South Atlantic League championship, defeating the Greenville Spinners in five games.

=== Playoff bracket ===
Semi-finals
1	Macon	4
4	Columbus	3
2	Savannah	3
3	Greenville	4

Finals
1	Macon	4
3	Greenville	1

== See also ==
- 1949 Major League Baseball season
