= 1952 South Atlantic League season =

- League: South Atlantic League
- Sport: Baseball
- Duration: April 16 – September 2
- Number of games: 154
- Number of teams: 8

Regular season
- League champions: Columbia Reds

Playoffs
- League champions: Montgomery Grays
- Runners-up: Macon Peaches

SAL seasons
- ← 1951 1953 →

The 1952 South Atlantic League was a Class A baseball season played between April 16 and September 2. Eight teams played a 154-game schedule, with the top four teams qualifying for the playoffs.

The Montgomery Grays won the South Atlantic League championship, defeating the Macon Peaches in the final round of the playoffs.

== Team changes ==
- The Montgomery Rebels are renamed to the Montgomery Grays.
- The Macon Peaches began an affiliation with the Chicago Cubs.

== Teams ==
1952 South Atlantic League
Team	City	MLB Affiliate	Stadium
Augusta Tigers	Augusta, Georgia	None	Municipal Stadium
Charleston Rebels	Charleston, South Carolina	Pittsburgh Pirates	College Park
Columbia Reds	Columbia, South Carolina	Cincinnati Reds	Capital City Stadium
Columbus Cardinals	Columbus, Georgia	St. Louis Cardinals	Golden Park
Jacksonville Tars	Jacksonville, Florida	New York Giants	Durkee Field
Macon Peaches	Macon, Georgia	Chicago Cubs	Luther Williams Field
Montgomery Grays	Montgomery, Alabama	None	Municipal Field
Savannah Indians	Savannah, Georgia	Philadelphia Athletics	Grayson Stadium

== Map of teams ==
South Atlantic League teams

== Regular season ==
=== Summary ===
- The Columbia Reds finish the season with the best record for the first time in franchise history.

=== Standings ===
South Atlantic League
Team	Win	Loss	%	GB
Columbia Reds	100	54	.649	–
Columbus Cardinals	87	67	.565	13
Montgomery Grays	86	68	.558	14
Macon Peaches	83	71	.539	17
Charleston Rebels	78	75	.510	21.5
Savannah Indians	74	79	.484	25.5
Jacksonville Tars	69	85	.448	31
Augusta Tigers	38	116	.247	62

== League Leaders ==
=== Batting leaders ===
Stat	Player	Total
AVG	Gill Daley, Columbus Cardinals	.365
H	Tom Hamilton, Savannah Indians	196
R	Bobby Wilson, Columbia Reds	112
2B	Tom Burgess, Columbus Cardinals; Bobby Wilson, Columbia Reds	40
3B	Gill Daley, Columbus Cardinals	12
HR	Dick Greco, Montgomery Rebels	24
RBI	Dick Greco, Montgomery Rebels	135
SB	Ross Passineau, Charleston Rebels	38

=== Pitching leaders ===
Stat	Player	Total
W	Barney Martin, Columbia Reds	23
ERA	George Dries, Charleston Rebels	1.93
CG	Bill Harrington, Savannah Indians; Barney Martin, Columbia Reds	25
SHO	Knowles Piercey, Macon Peaches	7
IP	Barney Martin, Columbia Reds	258.0
SO	Barney Martin, Columbia Reds	174

== Playoffs ==
- The Montgomery Grays won their second consecutive South Atlantic League championship, defeating the Macon Peaches in six games.

=== Playoff bracket ===
Semi-finals
1	Columbia	0
4	Macon	3
2	Columbus	2
3	Montgomery	3

Finals
4	Macon	2
3	Montgomery	4

== See also ==
- 1952 Major League Baseball season
