= 1951 South Atlantic League season =

- League: South Atlantic League
- Sport: Baseball
- Duration: April 18 – September 2
- Number of games: 140
- Number of teams: 8

Regular season
- League champions: Montgomery Rebels

Playoffs
- League champions: Montgomery Rebels
- Runners-up: Jacksonville Tars

SAL seasons
- ← 1950 1952 →

The 1951 South Atlantic League was a Class A baseball season played between April 18 and September 2. Eight teams played a 140-game schedule, with the top four teams qualifying for the playoffs.

The Montgomery Rebels won the South Atlantic League championship, defeating the Jacksonville Tars in the final round of the playoffs.

== Team changes ==
- The Greenville Spinners disband.
- The Montgomery Rebels join the league from the Southeastern League.
- The Augusta Tigers ended their affiliation with the Washington Senators.
- The Charleston Rebels ended their affiliation with the Chicago White Sox and began a new affiliation with the Pittsburgh Pirates.
- The Macon Peaches ended their affiliation with the Chicago Cubs.

== Teams ==
1951 South Atlantic League
Team	City	MLB Affiliate	Stadium
Augusta Tigers	Augusta, Georgia	None	Municipal Stadium
Charleston Rebels	Charleston, South Carolina	Pittsburgh Pirates	College Park
Columbia Reds	Columbia, South Carolina	Cincinnati Reds	Capital City Stadium
Columbus Cardinals	Columbus, Georgia	St. Louis Cardinals	Golden Park
Jacksonville Tars	Jacksonville, Florida	New York Giants	Durkee Field
Macon Peaches	Macon, Georgia	None	Luther Williams Field
Montgomery Rebels	Montgomery, Alabama	None	Municipal Field
Savannah Indians	Savannah, Georgia	Philadelphia Athletics	Grayson Stadium

== Map of teams ==
South Atlantic League teams

== Regular season ==
=== Summary ===
- The Montgomery Rebels finish the season with the best record for the first time in franchise history.

=== Standings ===
South Atlantic League
Team	Win	Loss	%	GB
Montgomery Rebels	85	55	.607	–
Jacksonville Tars	79	58	.577	4.5
Macon Peaches	75	63	.543	9
Charleston Rebels	75	65	.536	10
Columbus Cardinals	68	71	.489	16.5
Savannah Indians	64	74	.464	20
Augusta Tigers	62	76	.449	22
Columbia Reds	46	92	.333	38

== League Leaders ==
=== Batting leaders ===
Stat	Player	Total
AVG	Lou Kahn, Columbus Cardinals	.351
H	Rance Pless, Jacksonville Tars	185
R	William McDowell, Montgomery Rebels	121
2B	Rance Pless, Jacksonville Tars	37
3B	James Dickey, Columbus Cardinals	13
HR	Dick Greco, Montgomery Rebels	33
RBI	Billy Johnson, Montgomery Rebels	107
SB	Dick Smith, Charleston Rebels	28

=== Pitching leaders ===
Stat	Player	Total
W	Vince DiLorenzo, Jacksonville Tars	22
ERA	Sid West, Macon Peaches	2.31
CG	Harry Byrd, Savannah Indians	23
SHO	Pete Bryant, Columbus Cardinals; Charles Fowler, Jacksonville Tars; Al LaMacchia, Montgomery Rebels; Sid West, Macon Peaches	6
IP	Pete Bryant, Columbus Cardinals	254.0
SO	Harry Byrd, Savannah Indians	180

== Playoffs ==
- The Montgomery Rebels won their first South Atlantic League championship, defeating the Jacksonville Tars in four games.

=== Playoff bracket ===
Semi-finals
1	Montgomery	3
4	Charleston	2
2	Jacksonville	3
3	Macon	2

Finals
1	Montgomery	4
2	Jacksonville	0

== See also ==
- 1951 Major League Baseball season
