= 1947 South Atlantic League season =

- League: South Atlantic League
- Sport: Baseball
- Duration: April 14 – September 10
- Number of games: 154
- Number of teams: 8

Regular season
- League champions: Columbus Cardinals

Playoffs
- League champions: Savannah Indians
- Runners-up: Augusta Tigers

SAL seasons
- ← 1946 1948 →

The 1947 South Atlantic League was a Class A baseball season played between April 14 and September 10. Eight teams played a 154-game schedule, with the top four teams qualifying for the playoffs.

The Savannah Indians won the South Atlantic League championship, defeating the Augusta Tigers in the final round of the playoffs.

== Team changes ==
- The Greenville Spinners ended their affiliation with the Chicago White Sox and began a new affiliation with the Brooklyn Dodgers.

== Teams ==
1947 South Atlantic League
Team	City	MLB Affiliate	Stadium
Augusta Tigers	Augusta, Georgia	New York Yankees	Municipal Stadium
Charleston Rebels	Charleston, South Carolina	None	College Park
Columbia Reds	Columbia, South Carolina	Cincinnati Reds	Capital City Stadium
Columbus Cardinals	Columbus, Georgia	St. Louis Cardinals	Golden Park
Greenville Spinners	Greenville, South Carolina	Brooklyn Dodgers	Meadowbrook Park
Jacksonville Tars	Jacksonville, Florida	New York Giants	Durkee Field
Macon Peaches	Macon, Georgia	Chicago Cubs	Luther Williams Field
Savannah Indians	Savannah, Georgia	Philadelphia Athletics	Grayson Stadium

== Map of teams ==
South Atlantic League teams

== Regular season ==
=== Summary ===
- The Columbus Cardinals finish the season with the best record for the second consecutive season.

=== Standings ===
South Atlantic League
Team	Win	Loss	%	GB
Columbus Cardinals	88	65	.575	–
Savannah Indians	85	66	.563	2
Charleston Rebels	83	69	.546	4.5
Augusta Tigers	81	69	.540	5.5
Greenville Spinners	77	77	.500	11.5
Macon Peaches	70	82	.461	17.5
Jacksonville Tars	66	87	.431	22
Columbia Reds	59	94	.386	29

== League Leaders ==
=== Batting leaders ===
Stat	Player	Total
AVG	Ralph Brown, Augusta Tigers	.356
H	Ralph Brown, Augusta Tigers	228
R	Ralph Brown, Augusta Tigers	115
2B	Ralph Brown, Augusta Tigers	45
3B	Ed Mutryn, Savannah Indians	24
HR	Bill Hockenbury, Savannah Indians; Lloyd Lowe, Columbus Cardinals	19
RBI	Walter Schuerbaum, Augusta Tigers	118
SB	Eddie Pullins, Columbus Cardinals	52

=== Pitching leaders ===
Stat	Player	Total
W	Lou Brissie, Savannah Indians	23
ERA	Lou Brissie, Savannah Indians	1.91
CG	Lou Brissie, Savannah Indians	25
SHO	Mike Clark, Columbus Cardinals; Bobo Holloman, Macon Peaches; Lee Peterson, Columbus Cardinals	4
IP	Bobo Holloman, Macon Peaches	294.0
SO	Lou Brissie, Savannah Indians	278

== Playoffs ==
- The Savannah Indians won their fifth South Atlantic League championship, defeating the Augusta Tigers in five games.

=== Playoff bracket ===
Semi-finals
1	Columbus	2
4	Augusta	4
2	Savannah	4
3	Charleston	3

Finals
4	Augusta	1
2	Savannah	4

== See also ==
- 1947 Major League Baseball season
