= 1953 South Atlantic League season =

- League: South Atlantic League
- Sport: Baseball
- Duration: April 14 – September 2
- Number of games: 140
- Number of teams: 8

Regular season
- League champions: Jacksonville Braves

Playoffs
- League champions: Columbia Reds
- Runners-up: Jacksonville Braves

SAL seasons
- ← 1952 1954 →

The 1953 South Atlantic League was a Class A baseball season played between April 14 and September 2. Eight teams played a 140-game schedule, with the top four teams qualifying for the playoffs.

The Columbia Reds won the South Atlantic League championship, defeating the Jacksonville Braves in the final round of the playoffs.

== Team changes ==
- The Augusta Tigers are renamed to the Augusta Rams.
- The Jacksonville Tars end their affiliation with the New York Giants and began a new affiliation with the Milwaukee Braves. The club is renamed to the Jacksonville Braves.
- The Montgomery Grays begin an affiliation with the Detroit Tigers.

== Teams ==
1953 South Atlantic League
Team	City	MLB Affiliate	Stadium
Augusta Rams	Augusta, Georgia	None	Jennings Stadium
Charleston Rebels	Charleston, South Carolina	Pittsburgh Pirates	College Park
Columbia Reds	Columbia, South Carolina	Cincinnati Redlegs	Capital City Stadium
Columbus Cardinals	Columbus, Georgia	St. Louis Cardinals	Golden Park
Jacksonville Braves	Jacksonville, Florida	Milwaukee Braves	Durkee Field
Macon Peaches	Macon, Georgia	Chicago Cubs	Luther Williams Field
Montgomery Grays	Montgomery, Alabama	Detroit Tigers	Municipal Field
Savannah Indians	Savannah, Georgia	Philadelphia Athletics	Grayson Stadium

== Map of teams ==
South Atlantic League teams

== Regular season ==
=== Summary ===
- The Jacksonville Braves finish the season with the best record for the first time in franchise history.
- The Savannah Indians defeated the Macon Peaches in a tie-breaking game to finish in fourth place in the league standings and qualify for the post-season.

=== Standings ===
South Atlantic League
Team	Win	Loss	%	GB
Jacksonville Braves	93	44	.679	–
Columbia Reds	92	48	.657	2.5
Columbus Cardinals	67	70	.489	26
Savannah Indians	68	73	.482	27
Macon Peaches	67	74	.475	28
Augusta Rams	65	74	.468	29
Charleston Rebels	55	84	.396	39
Montgomery Grays	50	90	.357	44.5

== League Leaders ==
=== Batting leaders ===
Stat	Player	Total
AVG	Hank Aaron, Jacksonville Braves	.362
H	Hank Aaron, Jacksonville Braves	208
R	Hank Aaron, Jacksonville Braves	115
2B	Hank Aaron, Jacksonville Braves	36
3B	Jim Bolger, Columbia Reds	16
HR	Tommy Giordano, Savannah Indians	24
RBI	Hank Aaron, Jacksonville Braves	125
SB	Ev Joyner, Columbus Cardinals; Don Morrow, Montgomery Grays	19

=== Pitching leaders ===
Stat	Player	Total
W	Ray Crone, Jacksonville Braves; Larry Lassalle, Jacksonville Braves	19
ERA	Corky Valentine, Columbia Reds	2.11
CG	Joe Kuncl, Macon Peaches	21
SHO	Barney Martin, Columbia Reds	7
IP	Alfred Burch, Savannah Indians	254.0
SO	Larry Lassalle, Jacksonville Braves	185

== Playoffs ==
- The Columbia Reds won their second South Atlantic League championship, defeating the Jacksonville Braves in seven games.

=== Playoff bracket ===
Semi-finals
1	Jacksonville	3
4	Savannah	1
2	Columbia	3
3	Columbus	0

Finals
1	Jacksonville	3
2	Columbia	4

== See also ==
- 1953 Major League Baseball season
