= 1948 South Atlantic League season =

- League: South Atlantic League
- Sport: Baseball
- Duration: April 12 – September 8
- Number of games: 154
- Number of teams: 8

Regular season
- League champions: Charleston Rebels

Playoffs
- League champions: Greenville Spinners
- Runners-up: Columbia Reds

SAL seasons
- ← 1947 1949 →

The 1948 South Atlantic League was a Class A baseball season played between April 12 and September 8. Eight teams played a 154-game schedule, with the top four teams qualifying for the playoffs.

The Greenville Spinners won the South Atlantic League championship, defeating the Columbia Reds in the final round of the playoffs.

== Teams ==
1948 South Atlantic League
Team	City	MLB Affiliate	Stadium
Augusta Tigers	Augusta, Georgia	New York Yankees	Municipal Stadium
Charleston Rebels	Charleston, South Carolina	None	College Park
Columbia Reds	Columbia, South Carolina	Cincinnati Reds	Capital City Stadium
Columbus Cardinals	Columbus, Georgia	St. Louis Cardinals	Golden Park
Greenville Spinners	Greenville, South Carolina	Brooklyn Dodgers	Meadowbrook Park
Jacksonville Tars	Jacksonville, Florida	New York Giants	Durkee Field
Macon Peaches	Macon, Georgia	Chicago Cubs	Luther Williams Field
Savannah Indians	Savannah, Georgia	Philadelphia Athletics	Grayson Stadium

== Map of teams ==
South Atlantic League teams

== Regular season ==
=== Summary ===
- The Charleston Rebels finish the season with the best record for the first time since the 1942 season.

=== Standings ===
South Atlantic League
Team	Win	Loss	%	GB
Charleston Rebels	87	65	.572	–
Macon Peaches	86	68	.558	2
Greenville Spinners	84	69	.549	3.5
Columbia Reds	79	72	.523	7.5
Jacksonville Tars	78	75	.510	9.5
Columbus Cardinals	65	83	.439	20
Augusta Tigers	64	87	.424	22.5
Savannah Indians	63	87	.420	23

== League Leaders ==
=== Batting leaders ===
Stat	Player	Total
AVG	Hal Summers, Augusta Tigers	.331
H	Roy Marion, Charleston Rebels	197
R	Lloyd Merriman, Columbia Reds	120
2B	Edd Hartness, Macon Peaches	41
3B	Lloyd Merriman, Columbia Reds	18
HR	Hal Summers, Augusta Tigers	28
RBI	Hal Summers, Augusta Tigers	115
SB	Lloyd Merriman, Columbia Reds	44

=== Pitching leaders ===
Stat	Player	Total
W	Frank Smith, Columbia Reds	21
ERA	Alfred Boresh, Columbia Reds	2.13
CG	Augusto Zande, Columbus Cardinals	20
SHO	Alfred Boresh, Columbia Reds; Don Osborn, Macon Peaches	4
IP	Moe Burtschy, Savannah Indians	252.0
SO	Moe Burtschy, Savannah Indians	178

== Playoffs ==
- The Greenville Spinners won their fifth South Atlantic League championship, defeating the Columbia Reds in five games.

=== Playoff bracket ===
Semi-finals
1	Charleston	3
4	Columbia	4
2	Macon	3
3	Greenville	4

Finals
4	Columbia	1
3	Greenville	4

== See also ==
- 1948 Major League Baseball season
