= 1946 South Atlantic League season =

- League: South Atlantic League
- Sport: Baseball
- Duration: April 17 – September 4
- Number of games: 140
- Number of teams: 8

Regular season
- League champions: Columbus Cardinals

Playoffs
- League champions: Augusta Tigers
- Runners-up: Columbia Reds

SAL seasons
- ← 1942 1947 →

The 1946 South Atlantic League was a Class A baseball season played between April 17 and September 4. Eight teams played a 140-game schedule, with the top four teams qualifying for the playoffs.

The Augusta Tigers won the South Atlantic League championship, defeating the Columbia Reds in the final round of the playoffs.

== League changes ==
- At the end of the 1942 season, the South Atlantic League announced that the league would shutdown due to World War II. The league resumed play in 1946.
- The league was elevated from Class B to Class A beginning in 1946.

== Team changes ==
- The Columbus Red Birds are renamed to the Columbus Cardinals. The club remained affiliated with the St. Louis Cardinals.
- The Augusta Tigers ended their affiliation with the Detroit Tigers and began a new affiliation with the New York Yankees.
- The Greenville Spinners began an affiliation with the Chicago White Sox.
- The Savannah Indians began an affiliation with the Philadelphia Athletics.

== Teams ==
1946 South Atlantic League
Team	City	MLB Affiliate	Stadium
Augusta Tigers	Augusta, Georgia	New York Yankees	Municipal Stadium
Charleston Rebels	Charleston, South Carolina	None	College Park
Columbia Reds	Columbia, South Carolina	Cincinnati Reds	Capital City Stadium
Columbus Cardinals	Columbus, Georgia	St. Louis Cardinals	Golden Park
Greenville Spinners	Greenville, South Carolina	Chicago White Sox	Meadowbrook Park
Jacksonville Tars	Jacksonville, Florida	New York Giants	Durkee Field
Macon Peaches	Macon, Georgia	Chicago Cubs	Luther Williams Field
Savannah Indians	Savannah, Georgia	Philadelphia Athletics	Grayson Stadium

== Map of teams ==
South Atlantic League teams

== Regular season ==
=== Summary ===
- The Columbus Cardinals finish the season with the best record for the first time since 1939.

=== Standings ===
South Atlantic League
Team	Win	Loss	%	GB
Columbus Cardinals	79	60	.568	–
Columbia Reds	78	61	.561	1
Greenville Spinners	76	62	.551	2.5
Augusta Tigers	76	63	.547	3
Charleston Rebels	65	75	.464	14.5
Jacksonville Tars	65	75	.464	14.5
Macon Peaches	61	79	.436	18.5
Savannah Indians	55	81	.404	23.5

== League Leaders ==
=== Batting leaders ===
Stat	Player	Total
AVG	Ted Kluszewski, Columbia Reds	.352
H	Frank Baumholtz, Columbia Reds; Frank Boeck, Augusta Tigers	162
R	Frank Boeck, Augusta Tigers	103
2B	Frank Baumholtz, Columbia Reds	43
3B	Roy Broome, Columbus Cardinals	16
HR	Bob Erps, Columbus Cardinals	16
RBI	Roy Broome, Columbus Cardinals	99
SB	Roy Hartsfield, Charleston Rebels	18

=== Pitching leaders ===
Stat	Player	Total
W	Sheldon Jones, Jacksonville Tars; Dick Starr, Augusta Tigers	19
ERA	Dick Starr, Augusta Tigers	2.07
CG	Dick Starr, Augusta Tigers	24
SHO	Matthew Nolan, Greenville Spinners; Dick Starr, Augusta Tigers	5
IP	Dick Starr, Augusta Tigers	287.0
SO	Dick Starr, Augusta Tigers	233

== Playoffs ==
- The Augusta Tigers won their fourth South Atlantic League championship, defeating the Columbia Reds in four games.

=== Playoff bracket ===
Semi-finals
1	Columbus	1
4	Augusta	4
2	Columbia	4
3	Greenville	2

Finals
4	Augusta	4
2	Columbia	0

== See also ==
- 1946 Major League Baseball season
