= 1956 South Atlantic League season =

- League: South Atlantic League
- Sport: Baseball
- Duration: April 17 – September 5
- Number of games: 140
- Number of teams: 8

Regular season
- League champions: Jacksonville Braves

Playoffs
- League champions: Jacksonville Braves
- Runners-up: Columbus Foxes

SAL seasons
- ← 1955 1957 →

The 1956 South Atlantic League was a Class A baseball season played between April 17 and September 5. Eight teams played a 140-game schedule, with the top four teams qualifying for the playoffs.

The Jacksonville Braves won the South Atlantic League championship, defeating the Columbus Foxes in the final round of the playoffs.

== Team changes ==
- The Columbia Reds ended their affiliation with the Cincinnati Redlegs and began a new affiliation with the Kansas City Athletics. The club was renamed to the Columbia Gems.
- The Columbus Cardinals ended their affiliation with the St. Louis Cardinals and began a new affiliation with the Baltimore Orioles. The club was renamed to the Columbus Foxes.
- The Macon Peaches ended their affiliation with the Chicago Cubs and began a new affiliation with the Brooklyn Dodgers. The club was renamed to the Macon Dodgers.
- The Montgomery Rebels ended their affiliation with the Boston Red Sox and began a new affiliation with the Cleveland Indians.
- The Savannah Athletics ended their affiliation with the Kansas City Athletics and began a new affiliation with the Cincinnati Redlegs. The club was renamed to the Savannah Redlegs.

== Teams ==
1956 South Atlantic League
Team	City	MLB Affiliate	Stadium
Augusta Tigers	Augusta, Georgia	Detroit Tigers	Jennings Stadium
Charlotte Hornets	Charlotte, North Carolina	Washington Senators	Clark Griffith Park
Columbia Gems	Columbia, South Carolina	Kansas City Athletics	Capital City Stadium
Columbus Foxes	Columbus, Georgia	Baltimore Orioles	Golden Park
Jacksonville Braves	Jacksonville, Florida	Milwaukee Braves	Jacksonville Baseball Park
Macon Dodgers	Macon, Georgia	Brooklyn Dodgers	Luther Williams Field
Montgomery Rebels; Knoxville Smokies	Montgomery, Alabama; Knoxville, Tennessee	Cleveland Indians	Municipal Field; Knoxville Municipal Stadium
Savannah Redlegs	Savannah, Georgia	Cincinnati Redlegs	Grayson Stadium

== Map of teams ==
South Atlantic League teams

== Regular season ==
=== Summary ===
- The Jacksonville Braves finish the season with the best record for the first time since 1954.
- On June 18, the Montgomery Rebels relocated to Knoxville, Tennessee and were renamed to the Knoxville Smokies.

=== Standings ===
South Atlantic League
Team	Win	Loss	%	GB
Jacksonville Braves	87	53	.621	–
Columbus Foxes	79	61	.564	8
Charlotte Hornets	79	61	.564	8
Augusta Tigers	74	66	.529	13
Columbia Gems	64	76	.457	23
Macon Dodgers	64	76	.457	23
Savannah Redlegs	60	80	.429	27
Montgomery Rebels / Knoxville Smokies	53	87	.379	34

== League Leaders ==
=== Batting leaders ===
Stat	Player	Total
AVG	Lenny Green, Columbus Foxes	.318
H	Joseph Pahr, Columbia Gems	159
R	Lenny Green, Columbus Foxes	92
2B	Hank Moreno, Columbus Foxes; Joseph Pahr, Columbia Gems	28
3B	Danny Morejón, Savannah Redlegs	14
HR	Ed Barbarito, Jacksonville Braves	27
RBI	Ed Barbarito, Jacksonville Braves	99
SB	Danny Morejón, Savannah Redlegs	18

=== Pitching leaders ===
Stat	Player	Total
W	Juan Pizarro, Jacksonville Braves	23
ERA	John Tsitouris, Augusta Tigers	1.51
CG	Juan Pizarro, Jacksonville Braves	27
SHO	George Barker, Macon Dodgers; Evelio Hernández, Charlotte Hornets; Juan Pizarro, Jacksonville Braves	6
IP	Juan Pizarro, Jacksonville Braves	274.0
SO	Juan Pizarro, Jacksonville Braves	318

== Playoffs ==
- The Jacksonville Braves won their first South Atlantic League championship, defeating the Columbus Foxes in two games.

=== Playoff bracket ===
Semi-finals
1	Jacksonville	1
3	Charlotte	0
2	Columbus	1
4	Augusta	0

Finals
1	Jacksonville	2
2	Columbus	0

== See also ==
- 1956 Major League Baseball season
