= 1957 South Atlantic League season =

- League: South Atlantic League
- Sport: Baseball
- Duration: April 18 – September 8
- Number of games: 154
- Number of teams: 8

Regular season
- League champions: Augusta Tigers

Playoffs
- League champions: Charlotte Hornets
- Runners-up: Augusta Tigers

SAL seasons
- ← 1956 1958 →

The 1957 South Atlantic League was a Class A baseball season played between April 18 and September 8. Eight teams played a 154-game schedule, with the top four teams qualifying for the playoffs.

The Charlotte Hornets won the South Atlantic League championship, defeating the Augusta Tigers in the final round of the playoffs.

== Team changes ==
- The Columbus Foxes ended their affiliation with the Baltimore Orioles and began a new affiliation with the St. Louis Cardinals.
- The Knoxville Smokies ended their affiliation with the Cleveland Indians and began a new affiliation with the Baltimore Orioles.

== Teams ==
1957 South Atlantic League
Team	City	MLB Affiliate	Stadium
Augusta Tigers	Augusta, Georgia	Detroit Tigers	Jennings Stadium
Charlotte Hornets	Charlotte, North Carolina	Washington Senators	Clark Griffith Park
Columbia Gems	Columbia, South Carolina	Kansas City Athletics	Capital City Stadium
Columbus Foxes	Columbus, Georgia	St. Louis Cardinals	Golden Park
Jacksonville Braves	Jacksonville, Florida	Milwaukee Braves	Jacksonville Baseball Park
Knoxville Smokies	Knoxville, Tennessee	Baltimore Orioles	Knoxville Municipal Stadium
Macon Dodgers	Macon, Georgia	Brooklyn Dodgers	Luther Williams Field
Savannah Redlegs	Savannah, Georgia	Cincinnati Redlegs	Grayson Stadium

== Map of teams ==
South Atlantic League teams

== Regular season ==
=== Summary ===
- The Augusta Tigers finish the season with the best record for the first time since 1924.

=== Standings ===
South Atlantic League
Team	Win	Loss	%	GB
Augusta Tigers	98	56	.636	–
Charlotte Hornets	86	67	.562	11.5
Savannah Redlegs	81	72	.529	16.5
Knoxville Smokies	81	73	.526	17
Columbus Foxes	81	73	.526	17
Jacksonville Braves	76	78	.494	22
Columbia Gems	59	95	.383	39
Macon Dodgers	53	101	.344	45

== League Leaders ==
=== Batting leaders ===
Stat	Player	Total
AVG	Thomas St. John, Savannah Redlegs	.326
H	Ray Barker, Knoxville Smokies	174
R	Curt Flood, Savannah Redlegs	98
2B	Ray Barker, Knoxville Smokies	40
3B	Ray Barker, Knoxville Smokies	14
HR	Ray Barker, Knoxville Smokies; Lee Maye, Jacksonville Braves	23
RBI	Ray Barker, Knoxville Smokies	97
SB	Angelo Dagres, Knoxville Smokies	31

=== Pitching leaders ===
Stat	Player	Total
W	Artie Kay, Knoxville Smokies; Angel Oliva, Charlotte Hornets; Chi-Chi Olivo, Jacksonville Braves; Bob Saban, Charlotte Hornets; Bill Smith, Columbus Foxes	16
ERA	Ron Rozman, Augusta Tigers	1.64
CG	Robert Dobzanski, Savannah Redlegs; Garland Shifflett, Charlotte Hornets; Bill Smith, Columbus Foxes; Ben Swaringen, Columbia Gems	18
SHO	Bill Smith, Columbus Foxes	6
IP	Bill Smith, Columbus Foxes	242.0
SO	John Smith, Savannah Redlegs	196

== Playoffs ==
- The semi-finals are expanded to a best-of-three series.
- The Charlotte Hornets won their second South Atlantic League championship, defeating the Augusta Tigers in three games.

=== Playoff bracket ===
Semi-finals
1	Augusta	2
3	Savannah	0
2	Charlotte	2
4	Knoxville	0

Finals
1	Augusta	1
2	Charlotte	2

== See also ==
- 1957 Major League Baseball season
