= 1954 South Atlantic League season =

- League: South Atlantic League
- Sport: Baseball
- Duration: April 13 – September 1
- Number of games: 140
- Number of teams: 8

Regular season
- League champions: Jacksonville Braves

Playoffs
- League champions: Savannah Athletics
- Runners-up: Jacksonville Braves

SAL seasons
- ← 1953 1955 →

The 1954 South Atlantic League was a Class A baseball season played between April 13 and September 1. Eight teams played a 140-game schedule, with the top four teams qualifying for the playoffs.

The Savannah Athletics won the South Atlantic League championship, defeating the Jacksonville Braves in the final round of the playoffs.

== Team changes ==
- The Charleston Rebels fold.
- The Charlotte Hornets rejoin the league from the Tri-State League. The Hornets were affiliated with the Washington Senators and the club previously played in the South Atlantic League from 1919-1930.
- The Montgomery Grays ended their affiliation with the Detroit Tigers. The club was renamed to the Montgomery Rebels.
- The Savannah Indians are renamed to the Savannah Athletics. The club remained affiliated with the Philadelphia Athletics.

== Teams ==
1954 South Atlantic League
Team	City	MLB Affiliate	Stadium
Augusta Rams	Augusta, Georgia	None	Jennings Stadium
Charlotte Hornets	Charlotte, North Carolina	Washington Senators	Clark Griffith Park
Columbia Reds	Columbia, South Carolina	Cincinnati Redlegs	Capital City Stadium
Columbus Cardinals	Columbus, Georgia	St. Louis Cardinals	Golden Park
Jacksonville Braves	Jacksonville, Florida	Milwaukee Braves	Durkee Field
Macon Peaches	Macon, Georgia	Chicago Cubs	Luther Williams Field
Montgomery Rebels	Montgomery, Alabama	None	Municipal Field
Savannah Athletics	Savannah, Georgia	Philadelphia Athletics	Grayson Stadium

== Map of teams ==
South Atlantic League teams

== Regular season ==
=== Summary ===
- The Jacksonville Braves finish the season with the best record for the second consecutive season.

=== Standings ===
South Atlantic League
Team	Win	Loss	%	GB
Jacksonville Braves	83	57	.593	–
Savannah Athletics	80	60	.571	3
Macon Peaches	78	61	.561	4.5
Columbia Reds	77	62	.554	5.5
Montgomery Rebels	68	72	.486	15
Charlotte Hornets	62	77	.446	20.5
Augusta Rams	58	82	.414	25
Columbus Cardinals	51	86	.372	30.5

== League Leaders ==
=== Batting leaders ===
Stat	Player	Total
AVG	Al Pinkston, Savannah Athletics	.360
H	Al Pinkston, Savannah Athletics	180
R	Frank Robinson, Columbia Reds	112
2B	Jim Frey, Jacksonville Braves	40
3B	Carlos Paula, Charlotte Hornets	13
HR	James Dickey, Macon Peaches; Clarence Riddle, Jacksonville Braves	28
RBI	Clarence Riddle, Jacksonville Braves	112
SB	John Mitchell, Augusta Rams	22

=== Pitching leaders ===
Stat	Player	Total
W	Humberto Robinson, Jacksonville Braves	23
ERA	Humberto Robinson, Jacksonville Braves	2.41
CG	Humberto Robinson, Jacksonville Braves	23
SHO	Joe Stanka, Macon Peaches	5
IP	Humberto Robinson, Jacksonville Braves	276.0
SO	Humberto Robinson, Jacksonville Braves	243

== Playoffs ==
- The Savannah Athletics won their sixth South Atlantic League championship, defeating the Jacksonville Braves in seven games.

=== Playoff bracket ===
Semi-finals
1	Jacksonville	3
4	Columbia	1
2	Savannah	3
3	Macon	0

Finals
1	Jacksonville	3
2	Savannah	4

== See also ==
- 1954 Major League Baseball season
