= 1961 South Atlantic League season =

- League: South Atlantic League
- Sport: Baseball
- Duration: April 17 – September 5
- Number of games: 140
- Number of teams: 8

Regular season
- League champions: Asheville Tourists

SAL seasons
- ← 1960 1962 →

The 1961 South Atlantic League was a Class A baseball season played between April 17 and September 5. Eight teams played a 140-game schedule, with the top team winning the league pennant and championship.

The Asheville Tourists won the South Atlantic League pennant and championship, as they had the best record in the league.

== Team changes ==
- The Macon Dodgers leave the league and join the Southern Association.
- The Savannah Pirates disbanded.
- The Greenville Spinners are reactivated and the club rejoins the league, last playing in the Tri-State League in 1955. The Spinners last played in the South Atlantic League in 1950. The team begins an affiliation with the Los Angeles Dodgers.
- The Portsmouth-Norfolk Tides join the league as an expansion team. The club begins an affiliation with the Kansas City Athletics.
- The Asheville Tourists ended their affiliation with the Philadelphia Phillies and began a new affiliation with the Pittsburgh Pirates.
- The Jacksonville Braves ended their affiliation with the Milwaukee Braves and began a new affiliation with the Houston Colt .45s. The club was renamed the Jacksonville Jets.

== Teams ==
1961 South Atlantic League
Team	City	MLB Affiliate	Stadium
Asheville Tourists	Asheville, North Carolina	Pittsburgh Pirates	McCormick Field
Charleston White Sox	Charleston, South Carolina	Chicago White Sox	Hampton Park
Charlotte Hornets	Charlotte, North Carolina	Minnesota Twins	Clark Griffith Park
Columbia Reds	Columbia, South Carolina	Cincinnati Reds	Capital City Stadium
Greenville Spinners	Greenville, South Carolina	Los Angeles Dodgers	Meadowbrook Park
Jacksonville Jets	Jacksonville, Florida	Houston Colt .45s	Jacksonville Baseball Park
Knoxville Smokies	Knoxville, Tennessee	Detroit Tigers	Knoxville Municipal Stadium
Portsmouth-Norfolk Tides	Portsmouth, Virginia; Norfolk, Virginia	Kansas City Athletics	Frank D. Lawrence Stadium; High Rock Park

== Map of teams ==
South Atlantic League teams

== Regular season ==
=== Summary ===
- The Asheville Tourists finish the season with the best record in the league for the first time since 1928.

=== Standings ===
South Atlantic League
Team	Win	Loss	%	GB
Asheville Tourists	87	50	.635	–
Knoxville Smokies	75	64	.540	13
Greenville Spinners	72	66	.522	15.5
Columbia Reds	70	65	.519	16
Charleston White Sox	70	68	.507	17.5
Portsmouth-Norfolk Tides	66	72	.478	21.5
Charlotte Hornets	61	79	.436	27.5
Jacksonville Jets	51	88	.367	37

== League Leaders ==
=== Batting leaders ===
Stat	Player	Total
AVG	Teolindo Acosta, Columbia Reds	.343
H	Teolindo Acosta, Columbia Reds; Bill Roman, Knoxville Smokies	167
R	Gary Rushing, Asheville Tourists	108
2B	Wendell Antoine, Charlotte Hornets	37
3B	Bill Roman, Knoxville Smokies	17
HR	Gary Rushing, Asheville Tourists	25
RBI	Gary Rushing, Asheville Tourists	99
SB	Teolindo Acosta, Columbia Reds	40

=== Pitching leaders ===
Stat	Player	Total
W	Jack Taylor, Charlotte Hornets	17
ERA	Nick Willhite, Greenville Spinners	1.80
CG	Nick Willhite, Greenville Spinners	23
SHO	Nick Willhite, Greenville Spinners	6
IP	Nick Willhite, Greenville Spinners	230.0
SO	Nick Willhite, Greenville Spinners	161

== See also ==
- 1961 Major League Baseball season
