= 1942 South Atlantic League season =

- League: South Atlantic League
- Sport: Baseball
- Duration: April 20 – September 7
- Number of games: 140
- Number of teams: 8

Regular season
- League champions: Charleston Rebels

Playoffs
- League champions: Macon Peaches
- Runners-up: Charleston Rebels

SAL seasons
- ← 1941 1946 →

The 1942 South Atlantic League was a Class B baseball season played between April 20 and September 7. Eight teams played a 140-game schedule, with the top four teams qualifying for the playoffs.

The Macon Peaches won the South Atlantic League championship, defeating the Charleston Rebels in the final round of the playoffs.

== League changes ==
- At the end of the 1942 season, the South Atlantic League announced that the league would shutdown due to World War II. The league would resume play in 1946.

== Team changes ==
- The Greenville Spinners ended their affiliation with the Washington Senators.
- The Jacksonville Tars began an affiliation with the New York Giants.

== Teams ==
1942 South Atlantic League
Team	City	MLB Affiliate	Stadium
Augusta Tigers	Augusta, Georgia	Detroit Tigers	Municipal Stadium
Charleston Rebels	Charleston, South Carolina	None	College Park
Columbia Reds	Columbia, South Carolina	Cincinnati Reds	Dreyfus Park
Columbus Red Birds	Columbus, Georgia	St. Louis Cardinals	Golden Park
Greenville Spinners	Greenville, South Carolina	None	Meadowbrook Park
Jacksonville Tars	Jacksonville, Florida	New York Giants	Durkee Field
Macon Peaches	Macon, Georgia	Chicago Cubs	Luther Williams Field
Savannah Indians	Savannah, Georgia	None	Grayson Stadium

== Map of teams ==
South Atlantic League teams

== Regular season ==
=== Summary ===
- The Charleston Rebels finish the season with the best record for the first time in franchise history.

=== Standings ===
South Atlantic League
Team	Win	Loss	%	GB
Charleston Rebels	85	52	.620	–
Macon Peaches	81	57	.587	4.5
Jacksonville Tars	75	59	.560	8.5
Columbia Reds	66	68	.493	17.5
Savannah Indians	66	72	.478	19.5
Greenville Spinners	61	74	.452	23
Columbus Red Birds	58	80	.420	27.5
Augusta Tigers	54	84	.391	31.5

== League leaders ==
=== Batting leaders ===
Stat	Player	Total
AVG	Vic Bradford, Jacksonville Tars	.343
H	Vic Bradford, Jacksonville Tars	187
2B	Vic Bradford, Jacksonville Tars	45
3B	Andy Pafko, Macon Peaches	18
HR	Vic Bradford, Jacksonville Tars	13

=== Pitching leaders ===
Stat	Player	Total
W	Mack Stewart, Charleston Rebels	24
ERA	Jake Levy, Macon Peaches	1.85
IP	Jack Rager, Augusta Tigers; Burton Swift, Greenville Spinners	262.0

== Playoffs ==
- The Macon Peaches won their fifth South Atlantic League championship, defeating the Charleston Rebels in six games.

=== Playoff bracket ===
Semi-finals
1	Charleston	4
3	Jacksonville	1
2	Macon	4
4	Columbia	1

Finals
1	Charleston	2
2	Macon	4

== See also ==
- 1942 Major League Baseball season
