= 1941 South Atlantic League season =

- League: South Atlantic League
- Sport: Baseball
- Duration: April 21 – September 8
- Number of games: 140
- Number of teams: 8

Regular season
- League champions: Macon Peaches

Playoffs
- League champions: Columbia Reds
- Runners-up: Macon Peaches

SAL seasons
- ← 1940 1942 →

The 1941 South Atlantic League was a Class B baseball season played between April 21 and September 8. Eight teams played a 140-game schedule, with the top four teams qualifying for the playoffs.

The Columbia Reds won the South Atlantic League championship, defeating the Macon Peaches in the final round of the playoffs.

== Team changes ==
- The Augusta Tigers ended their affiliation with the New York Yankees and began a new affiliation with the Detroit Tigers.
- The Macon Peaches ended their affiliation with the Brooklyn Dodgers and began a new affiliation with the Chicago Cubs.

== Teams ==
1941 South Atlantic League
Team	City	MLB Affiliate	Stadium
Augusta Tigers	Augusta, Georgia	Detroit Tigers	Municipal Stadium
Charleston Rebels	Charleston, South Carolina	None	College Park
Columbia Reds	Columbia, South Carolina	Cincinnati Reds	Dreyfus Park
Columbus Red Birds	Columbus, Georgia	St. Louis Cardinals	Golden Park
Greenville Spinners	Greenville, South Carolina	Washington Senators	Meadowbrook Park
Jacksonville Tars	Jacksonville, Florida	None	Durkee Field
Macon Peaches	Macon, Georgia	Chicago Cubs	Luther Williams Field
Savannah Indians	Savannah, Georgia	None	Grayson Stadium

== Map of teams ==
South Atlantic League teams

== Regular season ==
=== Summary ===
- The Macon Peaches finish the season with the best record for the first time since 1930.

=== Standings ===
South Atlantic League
Team	Win	Loss	%	GB
Macon Peaches	90	50	.643	–
Columbia Reds	89	51	.636	1
Columbus Red Birds	68	69	.496	18.5
Augusta Tigers	64	74	.464	25
Jacksonville Tars	63	75	.457	26
Charleston Rebels	61	76	.445	27.5
Greenville Spinners	60	77	.438	28.5
Savannah Indians	57	80	.416	31.5

== League Leaders ==
=== Batting leaders ===
Stat	Player	Total
AVG	Cy Block, Macon Peaches	.357
H	Bobby Adams, Columbia Reds	195
2B	Lon Goldstein, Columbia Reds	48
3B	Johnny Ostrowski, Macon Peaches	20
HR	James Walsh, Jacksonville Tars; Clyde Vollmer, Columbia Reds	17

=== Pitching leaders ===
Stat	Player	Total
W	Sid West, Macon Peaches	23
ERA	Frank Manno, Macon Peaches	2.16
IP	Irv Stein, Charleston Rebels	284.0

== Playoffs ==
- The Columbia Reds won their first South Atlantic League championship, defeating the Macon Peaches in six games.

=== Playoff bracket ===
Semi-finals
1	Macon	4
3	Columbus	0
2	Columbia	4
4	Augusta	1

Finals
1	Macon	2
2	Columbia	4

== See also ==
- 1941 Major League Baseball season
