= 1950 South Atlantic League season =

- League: South Atlantic League
- Sport: Baseball
- Duration: April 12 – September 6
- Number of games: 154
- Number of teams: 8

Regular season
- League champions: Macon Peaches

Playoffs
- League champions: Macon Peaches
- Runners-up: Columbia Reds

SAL seasons
- ← 1949 1951 →

The 1950 South Atlantic League was a Class A baseball season played between April 12 and September 6. Eight teams played a 154-game schedule, with the top four teams qualifying for the playoffs.

The Macon Peaches won the South Atlantic League championship, defeating the Columbia Reds in the final round of the playoffs.

== Team changes ==
- The Augusta Tigers ended their affiliation with the New York Yankees and began a new affiliation with the Washington Senators.
- The Charleston Rebels ended their affiliation with the Chicago White Sox and began a new affiliation with the Pittsburgh Pirates.
- The Macon Peaches ended their affiliation with the Chicago Cubs.

== Teams ==
1950 South Atlantic League
Team	City	MLB Affiliate	Stadium
Augusta Tigers	Augusta, Georgia	Washington Senators	Municipal Stadium
Charleston Rebels	Charleston, South Carolina	Pittsburgh Pirates	College Park
Columbia Reds	Columbia, South Carolina	Cincinnati Reds	Capital City Stadium
Columbus Cardinals	Columbus, Georgia	St. Louis Cardinals	Golden Park
Greenville Spinners	Greenville, South Carolina	Brooklyn Dodgers	Meadowbrook Park
Jacksonville Tars	Jacksonville, Florida	New York Giants	Durkee Field
Macon Peaches	Macon, Georgia	None	Luther Williams Field
Savannah Indians	Savannah, Georgia	Philadelphia Athletics	Grayson Stadium

== Map of teams ==
South Atlantic League teams

== Regular season ==
=== Summary ===
- The Macon Peaches finish the season with the best record for the second consecutive season.

=== Standings ===
South Atlantic League
Team	Win	Loss	%	GB
Macon Peaches	90	63	.588	–
Savannah Indians	83	70	.542	7
Columbia Reds	83	70	.542	7
Charleston Rebels	79	72	.523	10
Columbus Cardinals	78	73	.517	11
Greenville Spinners	68	85	.444	22
Augusta Tigers	66	87	.431	24
Jacksonville Tars	63	90	.412	27

== League Leaders ==
=== Batting leaders ===
Stat	Player	Total
AVG	Pete Kraus, Charleston Rebels	.324
H	August Gregory, Macon Peaches	186
R	August Gregory, Macon Peaches	116
2B	Hal Keller, Augusta Tigers	37
3B	Mike Sichko, Greenville Spinners	16
HR	James Dickey, Columbus Cardinals	20
RBI	Lewis Davis, Macon Peaches	119
SB	Elwyn Rider, Augusta Tigers	27

=== Pitching leaders ===
Stat	Player	Total
W	Stan Karpinski, Macon Peaches	20
ERA	Moe Savransky, Columbia Reds	2.25
CG	Bill Seinsoth, Macon Peaches	27
SHO	Moe Savransky, Columbia Reds	5
IP	Fred Wollpert, Macon Peaches	281.0
SO	Bob Garber, Charleston Rebels	205

== Playoffs ==
- The semi-finals were shortened to a best-of-five series.
- The Macon Peaches won their seventh South Atlantic League championship, and second in a row, defeating the Columbia Reds in four games.

=== Playoff bracket ===
Semi-finals
1	Macon	3
4	Charleston	2
2	Savannah	2
3	Columbia	3

Finals
1	Macon	4
3	Columbia	0

== See also ==
- 1950 Major League Baseball season
