= 1962 South Atlantic League season =

- League: South Atlantic League
- Sport: Baseball
- Duration: April 13 – September 1
- Number of games: 140
- Number of teams: 8

Regular season
- League champions: Lynchburg White Sox

Playoffs
- League champions: Macon Peaches
- Runners-up: Knoxville Smokies

SAL seasons
- ← 1961 1963 →

The 1962 South Atlantic League was a Class A baseball season played between April 13 and September 1. Eight teams played a 140-game schedule, with the top four teams qualifying for the playoffs.

The Macon Peaches won the South Atlantic League championship, defeating the Knoxville Smokies in the final round of the playoffs.

== Team changes ==
- The Charleston White Sox relocated to Savannah, Georgia and were renamed to the Savannah White Sox.
- The Columbia Reds disbanded.
- The Jacksonville Jets disbanded.
- The Augusta Tigers rejoined the league, having last played in 1958. The club began an affiliation with the New York Yankees and were renamed to the Augusta Yankees.
- The Macon Dodgers rejoined the league after playing the 1961 season in the Southern Association and last played in the South Atlantic League in 1960. The club began an affiliation with the Cincinnati Reds and were renamed to the Macon Peaches.
- The Portsmouth-Norfolk Tides ended their affiliation with the Kansas City Athletics and began a new affiliation with the St. Louis Cardinals.

== Teams ==
1962 South Atlantic League
Team	City	MLB Affiliate	Stadium
Asheville Tourists	Asheville, North Carolina	Pittsburgh Pirates	McCormick Field
Augusta Yankees	Augusta, Georgia	New York Yankees	Jennings Stadium
Charlotte Hornets	Charlotte, North Carolina	Minnesota Twins	Clark Griffith Park
Greenville Spinners	Greenville, South Carolina	Los Angeles Dodgers	Meadowbrook Park
Knoxville Smokies	Knoxville, Tennessee	Detroit Tigers	Knoxville Municipal Stadium
Macon Peaches	Macon, Georgia	Cincinnati Reds	Luther Williams Field
Portsmouth-Norfolk Tides	Portsmouth, Virginia; Norfolk, Virginia	St. Louis Cardinals	Frank D. Lawrence Stadium; High Rock Park
Savannah White Sox; Lynchburg White Sox	Savannah, Georgia; Lynchburg, Virginia	Chicago White Sox	Grayson Stadium; City Stadium

== Map of teams ==
South Atlantic League teams

== Regular season ==
=== Summary ===
- The Lynchburg White Sox finish the season with the best record in the league for the first time in team history.
- On August 26, the Savannah White Sox relocated to Lynchburg, Virginia due to racial conflict. The club was renamed to the Lynchburg White Sox.

=== Standings ===
South Atlantic League
Team	Win	Loss	%	GB
Savannah White Sox / Lynchburg White Sox	92	47	.662	–
Knoxville Smokies	86	54	.614	6.5
Macon Peaches	80	59	.576	12
Asheville Tourists	70	70	.500	22.5
Greenville Spinners	65	75	.464	27.5
Augusta Yankees	57	83	.407	35.5
Portsmouth-Norfolk Tides	55	85	.393	37.5
Charlotte Hornets	54	86	.386	38.5

== League Leaders ==
=== Batting leaders ===
Stat	Player	Total
AVG	Tony Oliva, Charlotte Hornets	.350
H	Tommy Helms, Macon Peaches	195
R	Pete Rose, Macon Peaches	136
2B	Tommy Helms, Macon Peaches	38
3B	Pete Rose, Macon Peaches	17
HR	Duncan Campbell, Asheville Tourists; Elmo Plaskett, Asheville Tourists	27
RBI	Deacon Jones, Savannah / Lynchburg	101
SB	Chico Salmon, Knoxville Smokies	25

=== Pitching leaders ===
Stat	Player	Total
W	Camilo Estevis, Greenville Spinners	18
ERA	Dick Lines, Asheville Tourists	2.11
CG	Camilo Estevis, Greenville Spinners	23
SHO	Dick Lines, Asheville Tourists	9
IP	Leo Marentette, Knoxville Smokies	221.0
SO	Leo Marentette, Knoxville Smokies	205

== Playoffs ==
- The playoffs returned in 1962, with a best-of-five series for the semi-finals and the finals.
- The Macon Peaches won their ninth South Atlantic League championship, defeating the Knoxville Smokies in four games.

=== Playoff bracket ===
Semi-finals
1	Lynchburg	0
3	Macon	3
2	Knoxville	3
4	Asheville	1

Finals
3	Macon	3
2	Knoxville	1

== See also ==
- 1962 Major League Baseball season
