= 1958 South Atlantic League season =

- League: South Atlantic League
- Sport: Baseball
- Duration: April 15 – September 4
- Number of games: 140
- Number of teams: 6

Regular season
- League champions: Augusta Tigers

Playoffs
- League champions: Macon Dodgers
- Runners-up: Jacksonville Braves

SAL seasons
- ← 1957 1959 →

The 1958 South Atlantic League was a Class A baseball season played between April 15 and September 4. Six teams played a 140-game schedule, with the top four teams qualifying for the playoffs.

The Macon Dodgers won the South Atlantic League championship, defeating the Jacksonville Braves in the final round of the playoffs.

== Team changes ==
- The Columbia Gems disband.
- The Columbus Foxes moved to the Alabama-Florida League.

== Teams ==
1958 South Atlantic League
Team	City	MLB Affiliate	Stadium
Augusta Tigers	Augusta, Georgia	Detroit Tigers	Jennings Stadium
Charlotte Hornets	Charlotte, North Carolina	Washington Senators	Clark Griffith Park
Jacksonville Braves	Jacksonville, Florida	Milwaukee Braves	Jacksonville Baseball Park
Knoxville Smokies	Knoxville, Tennessee	Baltimore Orioles	Knoxville Municipal Stadium
Macon Dodgers	Macon, Georgia	Los Angeles Dodgers	Luther Williams Field
Savannah Redlegs	Savannah, Georgia	Cincinnati Redlegs	Grayson Stadium

== Map of teams ==
South Atlantic League teams

== Regular season ==
=== Summary ===
- The Augusta Tigers finish the season with the best record for the second consecutive season.

=== Standings ===
South Atlantic League
Team	Win	Loss	%	GB
Augusta Tigers	77	63	.550	–
Jacksonville Braves	76	64	.543	1
Macon Dodgers	70	70	.500	7
Charlotte Hornets	69	71	.493	8
Knoxville Smokies	67	73	.479	10
Savannah Redlegs	61	79	.436	16

== League Leaders ==
=== Batting leaders ===
Stat	Player	Total
AVG	George Alusik, Augusta Tigers	.325
H	Charlie Soraci, Macon Dodgers	170
R	Leo Burke, Knoxville Smokies	95
2B	Butch McCord, Macon Dodgers	37
3B	Angelo Dagres, Knoxville Smokies	14
HR	Carl Warwick, Macon Dodgers	22
RBI	George Alusik, Augusta Tigers; Harry Warner, Charlotte Hornets	88
SB	Mike Napoli, Macon Dodgers	29

=== Pitching leaders ===
Stat	Player	Total
W	Jerry Walker, Knoxville Smokies	18
ERA	Roberto Vargas, Macon Dodgers	1.79
CG	Garland Shifflett, Charlotte Hornets	18
SHO	Ross Carter, Jacksonville Braves	5
IP	Candido Andrade, Savannah Redlegs	257.0
SO	Chuck Estrada, Knoxville Smokies	181

== Playoffs ==
- The semi-finals are reduced to a one-game series.
- The Macon Dodgers won their eighth South Atlantic League championship, defeating the Jacksonville Braves in two games.

=== Playoff bracket ===
Semi-finals
1	Augusta	0
3	Macon	1
2	Jacksonville	1
4	Charlotte	0

Finals
3	Macon	2
2	Jacksonville	0

== See also ==
- 1958 Major League Baseball season
