= 1963 South Atlantic League season =

- League: South Atlantic League
- Sport: Baseball
- Duration: April 19 – September 2
- Number of games: 140
- Number of teams: 8

Regular season
- League champions: Macon Peaches

Playoffs
- League champions: Augusta Yankees
- Runners-up: Lynchburg White Sox

SAL seasons
- ← 1962

The 1963 South Atlantic League was a Class AA baseball season played between April 19 and September 2. Eight teams played a 140-game schedule, with the winner of each half of the season qualifying for the playoffs.

The Augusta Yankees won the South Atlantic League championship, defeating the Lynchburg White Sox in the final round of the playoffs.

== League changes ==
- The league was elevated from Class A to Class AA in 1963.
- Following the 1963 season, the South Atlantic League dissolved and was re-founded as the Southern League, maintaining a new set of records.

Following the 1963 season:

- The Asheville Tourists, Charlotte Hornets, Chattanooga Lookouts, Knoxville Smokies, Lynchburg White Sox and Macon Peaches joined the Southern League.
- The Augusta Yankees and Nashville Vols folded.

== Team changes ==
- The Greenville Spinners left the league and joined the Western Carolinas League.
- The Portsmouth-Norfolk Tides left the league and joined the Carolina League.
- The Chattanooga Lookouts joined the league after last playing in the Southern Association in 1961. The club began an affiliation with the Philadelphia Phillies.
- The Nashville Vols joined the league after last playing in the Southern Association in 1961. The club began an affiliation with the Los Angeles Angels.

== Teams ==
1963 South Atlantic League
| Team | City | MLB Affiliate | Stadium |
| Asheville Tourists | Asheville, North Carolina | Pittsburgh Pirates | McCormick Field |
| Augusta Yankees | Augusta, Georgia | New York Yankees | Jennings Stadium |
| Charlotte Hornets | Charlotte, North Carolina | Minnesota Twins | Clark Griffith Park |
| Chattanooga Lookouts | Chattanooga, Tennessee | Philadelphia Phillies | Engel Stadium |
| Knoxville Smokies | Knoxville, Tennessee | Detroit Tigers | Knoxville Municipal Stadium |
| Lynchburg White Sox | Lynchburg, Virginia | Chicago White Sox | City Stadium |
| Macon Peaches | Macon, Georgia | Cincinnati Reds | Luther Williams Field |
| Nashville Vols | Nashville, Tennessee | Los Angeles Angels | Sulphur Dell |

== Map of teams ==
South Atlantic League teams

== Regular season ==
=== Summary ===
- The Macon Peaches finish the season with the best record in the league for the first time since 1950.
- Despite finishing with the best record in the league, the Macon Peaches failed to qualify for the playoffs due to not having the best record in the league in either half of the season.

=== Standings ===
South Atlantic League
| Team | Win | Loss | % | GB |
|---|---|---|---|---|
| Macon Peaches | 81 | 59 | .579 | – |
| Lynchburg White Sox | 79 | 61 | .564 | 2 |
| Asheville Tourists | 79 | 61 | .564 | 2 |
| Augusta Yankees | 75 | 63 | .543 | 5 |
| Knoxville Smokies | 71 | 68 | .511 | 9.5 |
| Chattanooga Lookouts | 62 | 78 | .443 | 19 |
| Charlotte Hornets | 58 | 82 | .414 | 23 |
| Nashville Vols | 53 | 86 | .381 | 27.5 |

== League Leaders ==
=== Batting leaders ===
| Stat | Player | Total |
|---|---|---|
| AVG | Marv Staehle, Nashville Vols | .337 |
| H | Ike Futch, Augusta Yankees | 177 |
| R | Adolfo Phillips, Chattanooga Lookouts | 90 |
| 2B | Mel Corbo, Nashville Vols | 31 |
| 3B | Costen Shockley, Chattanooga Lookouts | 12 |
| HR | Frederick Loesekam, Lynchburg White Sox | 21 |
| RBI | Bert Barth, Charlotte Hornets | 80 |
| SB | Teolindo Acosta, Macon Peaches | 21 |

=== Pitching leaders ===
| Stat | Player | Total |
|---|---|---|
| W | Troy Giles, Asheville Tourists; Fred Talbot, Lynchburg White Sox | 18 |
| ERA | Thomas Richards, Lynchburg White Sox | 2.22 |
| CG | Troy Giles, Asheville Tourists | 19 |
| SHO | Jose Lizondro, Lynchburg White Sox | 7 |
| IP | Charlie Rabe, Macon Peaches | 221.0 |
| SO | Troy Giles, Asheville Tourists | 159 |

== Playoffs ==
- The Augusta Yankees won their sixth South Atlantic League championship, defeating the Lynchburg White Sox in five games.

=== Playoff bracket ===
| Finals |
| 1 | Lynchburg | 2 |
| 2 | Augusta | 3 |

== See also ==
- 1963 Major League Baseball season
