= Jerry Martin (baseball) =

American baseball player (born 1949)

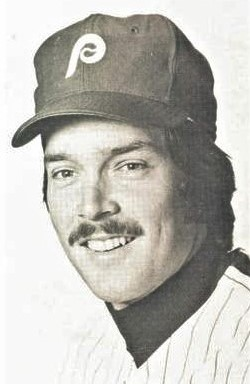
- Outfielder
- Born: May 11, 1949 (age 77); Columbia, South Carolina, U.S.
- Batted: Right Threw: Right

MLB debut
- September 7, 1974, for the Philadelphia Phillies

Last MLB appearance
- September 19, 1984, for the New York Mets

MLB statistics
- Batting average: .251
- Home runs: 85
- Runs batted in: 345
- Stats at Baseball Reference

Teams
- Philadelphia Phillies (1974–1978); Chicago Cubs (1979–1980); San Francisco Giants (1981); Kansas City Royals (1982–1983); New York Mets (1984)

Jerry Lindsey Martin (born May 11, 1949) is an American former professional baseball outfielder. He spent 11 years in Major League Baseball, from 1974 to 1984. On November 17, 1983, Martin and Kansas City Royals teammates Willie Aikens and Willie Wilson each received three-month prison terms on misdemeanor attempted cocaine possession charges. They became the first active major leaguers to serve jail time.

== Furman University Paladins basketball ==
Martin was born in Columbia, South Carolina, and attended Olympia High School there. He then attended Furman University in Greenville. He starred in basketball, and was named the All-Southern Conference Tournament Most Valuable Player in 1971 after leading the Furman Paladins to their first conference championship.

== Philadelphia Phillies ==
Despite his prowess in basketball, he decided to follow his father, Barney Martin, who pitched in the majors with the Cincinnati Reds, as well as his younger brother, Michael, a left handed pitcher selected fifth overall in the 1970 Major League Baseball draft by the Philadelphia Phillies. A year later, Jerry signed with the club as an amateur free agent. Despite having spent three seasons together in the same organization, the brothers were never teammates.

Martin earned Western Carolinas League MVP honors in 1972, when he batted .316 with twelve home runs and 112 runs batted in for the Spartanburg Phillies. Over four seasons in the Phillies' farm system, Martin batted .303 with 43 home runs and 290 RBIs to earn a September call-up to the majors in 1974. Making his major league debut as a late inning defensive replacement for Greg Luzinski on September 7, Martin did not log an at-bat. When given his first major league at bat two days later, he drove in Luzinski with the first run of the Phillies' 2-0 victory over the St. Louis Cardinals.

After splitting the 1975 season between the Phillies and the triple A Toledo Mud Hens, Martin spent the entire 1976 season serving as a late inning defensive replacement for Luzinski. He appeared in 130 games, but logged only 129 at-bats. He made just one plate appearance in the 1976 National League Championship Series against the Cincinnati Reds. He reached first base on an error, and scored on Jay Johnstone's triple in the ninth inning of the third game.

Despite having been a promising prospect for the Phillies, Martin would never rise above fourth outfielder status over his next two seasons with the Phillies. Just as pitchers and catchers were reporting to Spring training in 1979, Martin was sent to the Chicago Cubs in a blockbuster deal. He, Barry Foote, Ted Sizemore and minor leaguers Derek Botelho and Henry Mack went to the Cubs for Greg Gross, Dave Rader and Manny Trillo.

== Chicago Cubs ==
Finally given the opportunity to start, Martin had a career year his first season in Chicago. Playing centerfield and batting sixth in the Cubs' line-up, Martin clubbed nineteen home runs, and drove in 73 runs while scoring 74. He followed that up with a career high 23 home runs in 1980. After a contract dispute, Martin asked to be traded, and was sent to the San Francisco Giants with Jesús Figueroa and a player to be named later for Phil Nastu and Joe Strain at the 1980 Winter meetings.

== San Francisco Giants ==
Martin signed a five-year deal shortly after arriving in San Francisco, however, his tenure with the Giants ended up being shorter than expected. His numbers dipped in the strike shortened 1981 season, as he hit just four home runs and drove in 25 while batting .241. After just one season with the Giants, Martin was dealt to the Kansas City Royals for pitchers Rich Gale and Bill Laskey.

== Kansas City Royals ==
A new position came with his change of scenery, as Martin was shifted to right field with the Royals. He got off to a hot start in Kansas City, batting .304 with five home runs and 25 RBIs through May. Though he would cool off by the end of the season, his .266 batting average, fifteen home runs and 65 RBIs in 1982 was a marked improvement over his previous season.

He got off to a fast start in 1983 as well, but a muscle tear in his right wrist ended his season on April 24. Toward the end of the 1983 season, Martin and several of his Royals teammates were questioned by U.S. Attorney Jim Marquez in connection with a federal cocaine probe. Following the season, he, Willie Aikens and Willie Wilson pleaded guilty to attempting to purchase cocaine, while former teammate Vida Blue pleaded guilty to possession of three grams of cocaine. On November 17, Martin, Aikens, Blue and Wilson were all sentenced to a year in prison, with nine months of it suspended, and ordered to surrender to a Fort Worth, Texas, minimum security federal correctional institution on December 5 (Aikens was given until January 5 in order to complete a drug treatment program).

== New York Mets ==
Martin was released early from prison on February 23, 1984, however, Baseball commissioner Bowie Kuhn subsequently suspended all four players for the entire 1984 season. The suspensions were reduced after appeal, and the four were allowed to return to their teams on May 15. By then, Martin had signed with the New York Mets.

Martin joined the Mets on May 16 in San Francisco. Through 51 games with the Mets, Martin managed just a .154 batting average, three home runs and five RBIs, and was released on September 30.

A bid for a comeback in 1985 found no takers, so he retired. Martin took a coaching job in the Phillies' minor league system shortly after his retirement. He spent the first six weeks of the 2008 season as interim first base coach for the eventual World Champion Phillies while Davey Lopes was undergoing treatment for prostate cancer. Martin most recently served as hitting coach for the Detroit Tigers' double A affiliate, the Erie SeaWolves, in 2011 and 2012.

Tommy John called Martin "a strong defensive outfielder."

He is the son of Barney Martin, who pitched in a single game for the Cincinnati Reds in 1953.

== See also ==
- List of second-generation Major League Baseball players
