= Olympia Mill =

- U.S. National Register of Historic Places
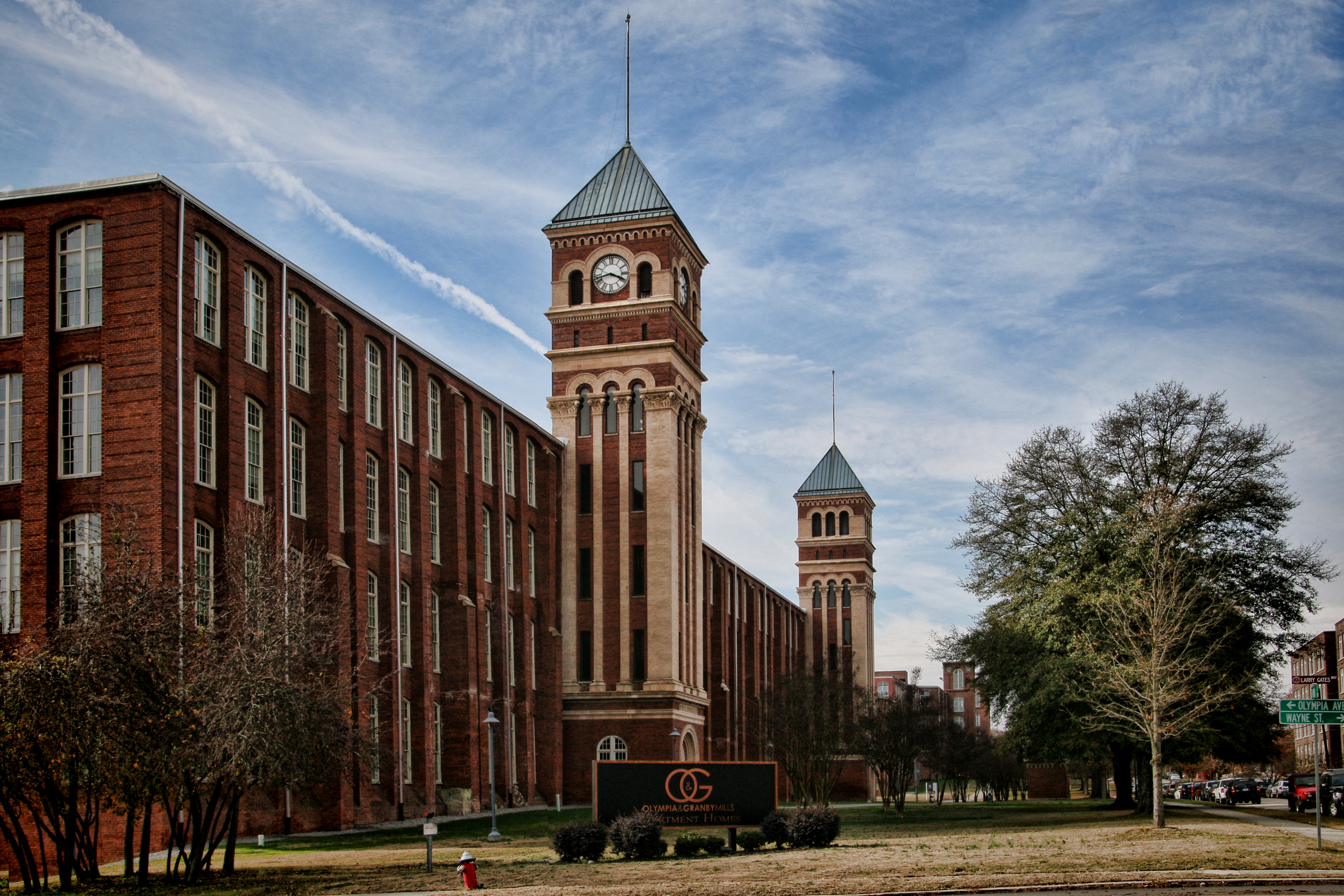

- Location within South Carolina Location within the United States
- Location: 500 Heyward St., Columbia, South Carolina
- Coordinates: 33°58′58″N 81°2′11″W
- Area: 6.7 acres (2.7 ha)
- Built: 1899
- Architect: Whaley, W.B. Smith & Co.
- Architectural style: Romanesque
- NRHP reference No.: 04001590
- Added to NRHP: February 2, 2005

Olympia Mill, also known as Pacific Mill, is a historic textile mill complex located at Columbia, South Carolina. It was built in 1899, and consists of a four-story, red brick, rectangular shaped, main mill building connected to a one and two-story red brick power plant. The main building is in the Romanesque Revival style and features terra cotta detailing, large segmental arched window openings, and twin pyramidal roofed towers. The complex also includes: a one-story brick power plant auxiliary building, a one-story storage building, and two small brick one-story gatehouses.

It was added to the National Register of Historic Places in 2005.
