= Bill Roman =

American baseball player (born 1938)

- First baseman
- Born: October 11, 1938 (age 86); Detroit, Michigan, U.S.
- Batted: Left Threw: Left

MLB debut
- September 30, 1964, for the Detroit Tigers

Last MLB appearance
- October 3, 1965, for the Detroit Tigers

MLB statistics
- Batting average: .143
- Home runs: 1
- Runs batted in: 1
- Stats at Baseball Reference

Teams
- Detroit Tigers (1964–1965)

Career highlights and awards
- Hit a home run in his first major league at-bat

William Anthony Roman (born October 11, 1938) is a retired Major League Baseball player who was a first baseman and pinch hitter during portions of the 1964 and 1965 seasons for the Detroit Tigers. The native of Detroit attended the University of Michigan, stood 6 feet 4 inches (1.93 m) tall and weighed 190 pounds (86 kg). He threw and batted left-handed.

Roman hit a home run in his first Major League at bat, as a pinch hitter on September 30, 1964, against Jim Bouton of the New York Yankees. Although a standout hitter (.290) in minor league baseball over six seasons between 1960 and 1965, Roman collected only five total hits in 35 at-bats during his two trials for the Tigers.

== See also ==
- List of players with a home run in first major league at bat
