= Dick Lines =

Canadian baseball player (born 1938)

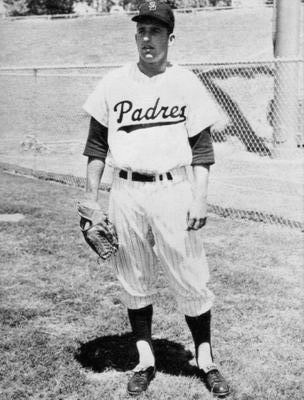
- Pitcher
- Born: August 17, 1938 (age 87); Montreal, Quebec, Canada
- Batted: Right Threw: Left

MLB debut
- April 16, 1966, for the Washington Senators

Last MLB appearance
- October 1, 1967, for the Washington Senators

MLB statistics
- Win–loss record: 7–7
- Earned run average: 2.83
- Strikeouts: 103
- Stats at Baseball Reference

Teams
- Washington Senators (1966–1967)

Richard George Lines (born August 17, 1938) is a Canadian former Major League Baseball relief pitcher who appeared in 107 games for the Washington Senators in 1966 and 1967.

Born in Montréal, Lines emigrated to the United States with his parents as a baby. He is a graduate of Manchester High School in Midlothian, Virginia and spent 13 years in professional baseball (1957–1969). He threw left-handed, batted right-handed, and was listed as 6 feet 1 inch (1.85 m) tall and 175 pounds (79 kg).

Lines was signed by the Pittsburgh Pirates before the 1957 season, and was a starting pitcher for eight years in the minor leagues before being converted to relief in 1965 with the Hawaii Islanders of the Triple-A Pacific Coast League.

In December 1965, he was working for a meat distributor in Fort Lauderdale, Florida when he dropped 30 pounds (14 kg) of frozen spare ribs on his left foot, fracturing his big toe. Fortunately for Lines, he was ready for spring training in 1966 and made the Washington club that April. He was an effective relief pitcher for the Senators during his two full seasons with them. He finished his brief major-league career with a total of seven wins, seven losses, six saves, 41 games finished, an excellent WHIP of 1.150, and an ERA of 2.83. In 1682/3 innings pitched, he permitted 146 hits and 48 bases on balls, striking out 103.
