= Ultus Álvarez =

Cuban baseball player

- Outfielder
- Born: May 2, 1933; Cumanayagua, Cienfuegos, Cuba
- Died: August 6, 2010 (aged 77); Miami, Florida, U.S.
- Batted: Right Threw: Right

Ultus Álvarez Suárez (May 2, 1933 – August 6, 2010) was a Cuban League baseball player who also spent 13 seasons in US minor league baseball.

== Cuban League career ==
Alvarez played for Cienfuegos in the 1950s, leading the league with 10 home runs in 1955–1956.

== Minor league career ==
Alvarez played in the minor leagues from 1952 to 1964. Beginning his career at 19 years old, he was a member of the Brooklyn Dodgers system in 1952 and 1953, the Cincinnati Reds system from 1955 to 1961, the Cleveland Indians system in 1962 and the Minnesota Twins system in 1964. In 1963, he played in the Mexican League. He was a Southern Association All-Star in 1959, hitting .297 with 15 home runs and 87 RBI in 132 games for the Nashville Volunteers.

In the affiliated minor leagues, Alvarez hit .278 with 142 home runs and 1,417 hits in 12 seasons. He spent part or all of five seasons at Triple-A, though he never reached the major leagues.
