= Barney Martin (baseball) =

American baseball player (1923-1997)

- Pitcher
- Born: March 3, 1923; Columbia, South Carolina, U.S.
- Died: October 30, 1997 (aged 74); Columbia, South Carolina, U.S.
- Batted: Right Threw: Right

MLB debut
- April 22, 1953, for the Cincinnati Redlegs

Last MLB appearance
- April 22, 1953, for the Cincinnati Redlegs

MLB statistics
- Win–los record: 0–0
- Earned run average: 9.00
- Strikeouts: 1
- Stats at Baseball Reference

Teams
- Cincinnati Redlegs (1953)

Barnes Robertson “Barney” Martin (March 3, 1923 – October 30, 1997) was an American professional baseball pitcher who had a "cup of coffee" with the Cincinnati Redlegs of Major League Baseball in 1953. Born in Columbia, South Carolina, he threw and batted right-handed and was listed as 5 feet 11 inches (1.80 m) tall and 170 pounds (77 kg).

== Career ==
Though Martin appeared in just one MLB game, he had a ten-year minor-league career. Originally signed by the New York Giants as an amateur free agent before the 1946 season, Martin compiled a 44–43 record and 4.06 earned run average in five seasons in their farm system. He was then acquired by Cincinnati sometime during the 1951 season, and posted a 23–7 record, 2.13 ERA, and a Sally League-leading 174 strikeouts for the Columbia Reds, who played in Martin's home town, in 1952.

That performance earned him a spot with the big league club for 1953. On April 22, the sixth game of the regular season, the Redlegs was already losing 6-2 to the St. Louis Cardinals with Stan Musial set to lead off the seventh inning, when manager Rogers Hornsby summoned Martin to relieve Bud Podbielan. Martin retired Musial, and got out of his first inning of work unscathed. In his second frame, however, he allowed a lead-off triple to Rip Repulski, followed by a double to Del Rice. After retiring the next two batters, it appeared Martin would escape with just the one run scored; however, Red Schoendienst followed with a double to drive in Rice, and bring Musial back to the plate. Musial grounded out to short to end the inning without further damage.

Five days later, Martin was optioned back to Columbia, where he would compile a 17–6 record with a 2.14 ERA. His overall minor league stats include 104 wins versus 74 losses in 245 games (128 starts). His minor league ERA was 3.35. While pitching for Columbia, he was the team's bus driver and was also a railroad engineer for Southern Railway.

== Family ==
Two of Martin's sons played professional ball. Michael, a left-handed pitcher, was selected fifth overall in the 1970 Major League Baseball draft by the Philadelphia Phillies, but ultimately was unable to make the major leagues. A year later, the Phillies signed older brother Jerry, an outfielder, as an undrafted free agent. Despite spending three seasons together in the same organization, Michael and Jerry were never teammates. Jerry went on to play 1,018 games in the majors for five clubs between 1974 and 1984.
