= Horace Garner =

- Outfielder
- Born: July 17, 1923
- Died: July 6, 1995 (aged 71)
- Batted: Right Threw: Right

Teams
- Indianapolis Clowns (1949)

Horace T. Garner (July 17, 1923 – July 6, 1995) was an American baseball outfielder. He played for the Indianapolis Clowns of the Negro American League in 1949 and played in minor league baseball for ten seasons, from 1951 to 1959 and in 1961.

In the minor leagues, Garner played in the Boston Braves (later the Milwaukee Braves) farm system. In 1953, the Braves sent Garner, along with fellow black teammates Hank Aaron and Félix Mantilla, to the Jacksonville Braves in the South Atlantic League. The team thus became one of the first two racially integrated teams in the South Atlantic League, and one of the first ever in Florida.

Garner spent ten seasons in the minor leagues, from 1951 to 1959 and in 1961. He hit .321 with 1,115 hits, 190 doubles, 37 triples and 157 home runs in 997 games.
