= Lou Brissie =

American baseball player (1924–2013)

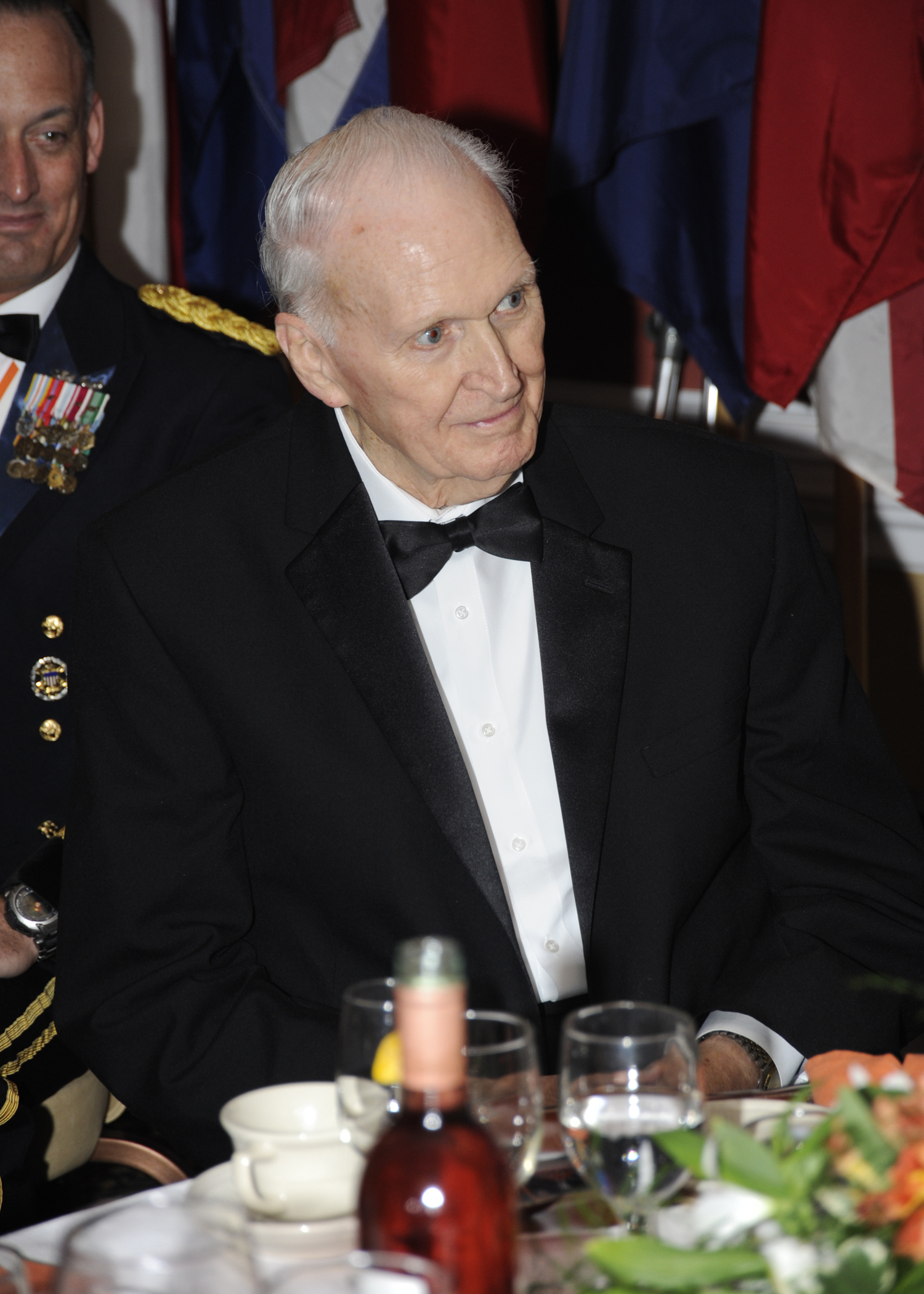
- Brissie in 2009
- Pitcher
- Born: June 5, 1924; Anderson, South Carolina, U.S.
- Died: November 25, 2013 (aged 89); Augusta, Georgia, U.S.
- Batted: Left Threw: Left

MLB debut
- September 28, 1947, for the Philadelphia Athletics

Last MLB appearance
- September 1, 1953, for the Cleveland Indians

MLB statistics
- Win–loss record: 44–48
- Earned run average: 4.07
- Strikeouts: 436
- Stats at Baseball Reference

Teams
- Philadelphia Athletics (1947–1951); Cleveland Indians (1951–1953)

Career highlights and awards
- All-Star (1949)

Leland Victor Brissie (June 5, 1924 – November 25, 2013) was an American professional baseball pitcher who played in Major League Baseball from 1947 to 1953 for the Philadelphia Athletics and Cleveland Indians.

== Youth and World War II ==
Brissie began his baseball career in 1940 when at the age of 16 he pitched for Ware Shoals in a textile baseball league. Brissie attracted the attention of Connie Mack and the Philadelphia Athletics in 1941; however his father insisted he finish school.

Brissie attended Presbyterian College before enlisting in the U.S. Army in December 1942. In November 1944, he found himself in heavy fighting in Italy with the 88th Infantry Division (Fighting Blue Devils). On December 2, 1944, his unit suffered an artillery barrage, and a shell exploded which shattered his left tibia and shinbone in 30 pieces. At the Army field hospital, doctors told Brissie that his leg would have to be amputated due to the severity of the injury. Brissie told the doctors that he was a ballplayer and insisted that the leg be saved even if it jeopardized his life.

Brissie's military citations included the Bronze Star Medal, Purple Heart with Oak Leaf Cluster, ETO and the American Campaign Medal.

== Major league career ==
After two years and 23 major operations, Brissie was able to return to baseball with a metal brace on his leg. He was signed by the Philadelphia A's Connie Mack on December 15, 1946. Mack earlier had encouraged Brissie to hold on to his dream of playing in the majors. Following spring training in 1947, he sent Brissie to the Athletics’ affiliate minor league team in Savannah in the AA Southern League where his baseball comeback began well when he won 25 games. The A's called him up to Philadelphia and on September 28, 1947, he realized his "life's ambition" of pitching in the major leagues.

Brissie's first start of the 1948 season was against the Boston Red Sox. During the course of the game, Ted Williams hit a ball up the middle of the field, striking Brissie's leg and causing him to collapse on the mound. "I hit a ball back to the box, a real shot, whack, like a rifle clap,” Williams recalled in his memoir My Turn at Bat (1969), written with John Underwood. “Down he goes, and everybody rushes out there, and I go over from first base with this awful feeling I’ve really hurt him. Here’s this war hero, pitching a great game. He sees me in the crowd, looking down at him, my face like a haunt. He says, ‘For chrissakes, Williams, pull the damn ball.’" Brissie went on to defeat the Red Sox 4–2, striking out Williams for the game's final out. Later on July 19, he gave up an extra-inning home run to Pat Seerey; it was Seerey's fourth home run of the game, tying a major league record then held by only four previous players.

Brissie's best seasons were with the A's: 1948 when he was 14–10 and 1949 when he was 16–11. He pitched three innings for the 1949 American League All Star team. Finishing fifth after a spectacular early start, the A's with pitchers Brissie, Alex Kellner, and with diminutive pitcher Bobby Shantz pitching effectively in relief finished fifth in the standings in 1949, one of their best post-World War II seasons.

Brissie was traded to the Cleveland Indians on April 30, 1951. This was part of a three-way trade between the Indians, Athletics and Chicago White Sox. A notable result of the trade was Cleveland utility player Minnie Miñoso going to the White Sox where he became the first black major league player in Chicago's history and soon became an All-Star. Gus Zernial and Dave Philley went to Philadelphia and were key players the following years for the A's. Brissie retired in September 1953 with a career record of 44–48, with 436 strikeouts and a 4.07 ERA.

== Life after baseball ==
Following his retirement from baseball, Brissie served as the National Director of the American Legion Baseball program. Subsequently, he served on the President's Physical Fitness Council, worked as a baseball scout and for a South Carolina state worker training agency. In his later years, Brissie relied on crutches and was in constant pain. He frequently spoke to veterans of wars in Iraq and Afghanistan. In 2010 Brissie, along with Yogi Berra, Jerry Coleman and John "Mule" Miles was honored in a ceremony at Washington, D.C.'s Nationals Park.

Brissie died at the Augusta VA Hospital in Augusta, Georgia, on November 25, 2013, aged 89. His first wife, Dorothy "Dot" Morgan, died in 1967 after 23 years of marriage. Their son, Ronald Brissie, died in 2002. His widow is the former Diana Ingate Smith, married for 38 years, and their daughter, Jennifer Brissie.
