= Dick Greco (baseball) =

American baseball player

Richard Anthony Greco (July 2, 1925 – July 5, 2012) was a minor league baseball player who hit over 300 home runs in a 12-year career that spanned from 1946 to 1957. He slugged at least 20 home runs a year from 1946 to 1952 - a stretch of seven campaigns - and had at least 30 home runs in a season five times. He hit .300 or better in 10 of the 12 years he played. He is considered, "the most prolific home run hitter from Tacoma" and was considered "the Babe Ruth of the bush leagues." Though he spent parts of four seasons at Triple-A, he never played in the major leagues.

== Personal life ==
He was born in Tacoma, Washington and graduated from Stadium High School. He served in the United States Navy during World War II. He died at the age of 87.

== Baseball career ==
He began his professional career as a 20-year-old in the Chicago Cubs system in 1946, hitting .332 with 26 home runs, a .626 slugging percentage and 249 total bases in 122 games between the Visalia Cubs and Tacoma Tigers. In 1947, he hit .313 with 21 home runs and 240 total bases in 133 games for Tacoma and in 1948, he batted .333 with a .552 slugging percentage, 25 home runs, 37 doubles, 11 triples, 203 hits and 337 total bases in 159 games between Tacoma - now an unaffiliated team - and the Triple-A San Diego Padres of the Pacific Coast League. 1949 was spent mostly with the still-unaffiliated Tacoma, though Greco also played briefly for the Oklahoma City Indians and San Diego Padres in the Cleveland Indians system as well. Overall, he hit .330 with a .604 slugging percentage, 33 home runs, 32 doubles and 179 hits in 156 games.

The slugger played 148 of his 149 games with Tacoma - now an Indians affiliate - in 1950, spending a lone game with San Diego as well. Between the two clubs, the 24-year-old hit .361 with 36 home runs, 30 doubles, 11 triples, 204 hits, a .644 slugging percentage and 364 total bases. He led the Western International League in home runs, total bases, hits and RBI (154). Between the Montgomery Rebels and Birmingham Barons, a Boston Red Sox affiliate, in 1951, Greco batted .312 with 36 home runs, a .618 slugging percentage and 285 total bases in 137 games. He led the South Atlantic League in home runs. He spent all of 1952 with the Montgomery Grays, hitting .298 with 24 home runs and a .499 slugging average in 151 games, pacing the South Atlantic League in dingers and winning the league's Most Valuable Player honor, and in 1953, he hit .258 with 12 home runs and .403 slugging mark in 133 games between the Williamsport A's and Triple-A Ottawa A's in the Philadelphia A's system.

He played for the unaffiliated Vancouver Capilanos in 1954, hitting .305 with a .615 slugging percentage and 19 home runs in 97 games. With the Baltimore Orioles-affiliated Thetford Mines Miners in 1955, Greco hit .305 with 22 home runs in 76 games. He hit .356 with 44 home runs, a .685 slugging percentage, 369 total bases, 192 hits and 39 doubles in 140 games for the Modesto Reds in 1956 and in 1957, his final campaign, he hit .364 with a 30 home runs and a .656 slugging percentage in 112 games for the Washington Senators-affiliated Missoula Timberjacks. He led the Pioneer League in home runs and batting average. He also spent some time with the Mexican League's Veracruz Aguila, hitting .367 with five home runs with them.

Overall, Greco hit around .328 with 333 home runs and at least 1,824 hits and 318 doubles in 1,565-plus games. He also made 26 pitching appearances, going 3-7. He managed the Modesto Reds briefly in 1956.

== Post-baseball life ==
He became an auditor Pierce County, Washington in 1969. He resigned from the position in 1986 and three months later was indicted on charges of bribery and of official misconduct for taking bribes. Though he fought the charges, he was convicted and sentenced to prison, serving four years before being released in 1998.

He was elected to the Tacoma-Pierce County Hall of Fame in 1989 and won the Cy Greenlaw Old-Timers Salute Award in 2009.
