= Wolfson Park =

Baseball park in Jacksonville, Florida

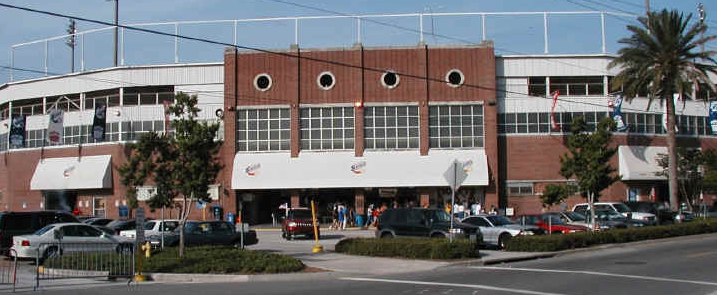
- Interactive map of Wolfson Park
- Full name: Samuel W. Wolfson Baseball Park
- Former names: New Jacksonville Baseball Park (planning/construction); Jacksonville Baseball Park (1955–1964)
- Location: 1201 East Duval Street; Jacksonville, Florida 32202
- Coordinates: 30.325888°N 81.639844°W
- Owner: City of Jacksonville
- Operator: SMG
- Capacity: 8,200

Construction
- Opened: March 16, 1955
- Closed: September 3, 2002
- Demolished: September 26, 2002
- Cost: US$400,000 (US$4.96 million in 2025 dollars)

Tenants
- Jacksonville Braves (South Atlantic) (1955–60); Jacksonville Jets (South Atlantic) (1961); Jacksonville Suns (International) (1962–68), (Southern) (1970–2002); Jacksonville Cyclones (USL A-League) (1998–99)

Samuel W. Wolfson Baseball Park (originally Jacksonville Baseball Park) was a baseball park in Jacksonville, Florida. It stood from 1954 until 2002, when it was demolished and replaced by the new Baseball Grounds of Jacksonville. During that time it was home to all of Jacksonville's minor league baseball teams, including the Jacksonville Braves (1955–1960), the Jacksonville Jets (1961), and the Jacksonville Suns (1962–1968 and 1970–2002). It had a seating capacity of 8,200 and was named for local baseball owner Samuel W. Wolfson.

== History ==
The facility, originally known as Jacksonville Baseball Park^{a}, was built in 1954 at a cost of $400,000 to replace the aging Durkee Field. It was intended to be the new home stadium of Jacksonville's minor league team, the Jacksonville Braves of the South Atlantic League. One of the major proponents of the stadium was Braves owner Samuel W. Wolfson, a local businessman. Wolfson had purchased the struggling Jacksonville Tars franchise and reorganized them as the Braves prior to the 1953 season.

The new park opened on March 16, 1955, with an exhibition game between the Washington Senators (now the Minnesota Twins) and the Cincinnati Redlegs. According to H. B. Richardson, Jacksonville Braves general manager at the time, "When the new park opened, it was the best park in the (Double-A) South Atlantic League and probably better than most (Triple-A) Southern League parks at the time. It was a showcase." Phil Niekro stated, "When I played there, Wolfson Park was one of the finest in the country. It made me feel like I was already in the big leagues." Although used primarily for baseball, the facility hosted other events until the Jacksonville Coliseum was built in 1961. A show in July 1955 featured a young Elvis Presley who hid out in a bathroom, then the ticket office, to avoid being mobbed by female fans.

After selling the team to Bill Terry in 1958, Wolfson became president of the South Atlantic League for a year. In 1962, he was named president of the Jacksonville Suns, a new Triple-A franchise. Wolfson died of bone cancer in 1963 and the Jacksonville Baseball Park was renamed Wolfson Park after him. The park continued to serve as the Suns' home stadium for the next four decades. However, age took its toll, and in 2000 plans were drawn up to replace it. The last exhibition game played at Wolfson Park was in 1998, when the Florida Marlins played the Detroit Tigers.

== Features ==
The park had several features that were unusual among ballparks.

- The infield and base paths outside of the mound, around home plate, and sliding pits around each base were grass, a configuration more commonly associated with artificial turf fields.
- The outfield wall was 25 feet high, all the way around. There were no seats in the outfield.
- The first three rows of seats were in front of the dugouts, permitting fans to look directly into them.
- The digital scoreboard from 1980 that replaced the original sun shaped scoreboard in center left field was not located inside the stadium—it was across a street from the outfield wall.
- The entire grandstand, including the lower boxes, was covered by a roof.

== Notable athletes ==
In late March 1955, 8,209 fans paid to watch the Milwaukee Braves and the Brooklyn Dodgers play an exhibition game that included numerous individuals who were eventually elected to the Baseball Hall of Fame in Cooperstown, New York. Among them: Hank Aaron, Walter Alston, Roy Campanella, Tommy Lasorda, Eddie Mathews, Pee Wee Reese, Jackie Robinson, Duke Snider and Warren Spahn.

Over the years, dozens of future stars played in the park before moving up to the majors. Those players include Tommie Aaron, Delino DeShields, Andrés Galarraga, Mark Gardner, Randy Johnson, Edgar Martínez, Tug McGraw, Phil Niekro, Dan Quisenberry, Alex Rodriguez, Nolan Ryan, Bret Saberhagen, Tom Seaver, Matt Stairs, Luis Tiant, Bob Uecker and Larry Walker. Michael Jordan, the NBA All-star who left basketball to attempt a pro baseball career with the Birmingham Barons, played in a three-game series in 1994 at Wolfson Park which generated the sale of 30,000 tickets. Attendance in the third game was 12,390 fans, the most since 1962.

== Demolition ==
The facility was demolished in 2002 and replaced with new practice fields for the Jacksonville Jaguars and a parking lot for TIAA Bank Field. The Suns moved two blocks west to the new Baseball Grounds of Jacksonville in 2003.

Sam W. Wolfson Baseball Park
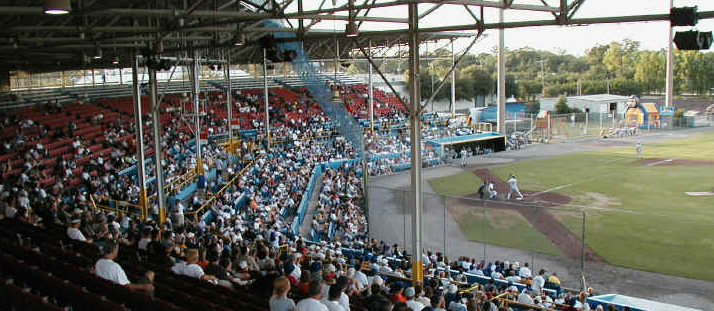
Box seats of Sam Wolfson Baseball Park

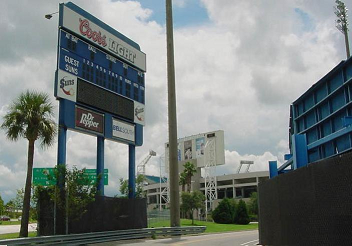
View of outfield wall & scoreboard outside the park

Preceded by Durkee Field	Jacksonville Baseball Park; Sam W. Wolfson Baseball Park; 1955–2002	Succeeded by Baseball Grounds of Jacksonville; 2003

== Notes ==
- ^aLocal newspaper, The Florida Times-Union shows the original name as "Municipal Stadium", while former operator SMG notates "Municipal Ballpark". However, it appears the name "Jacksonville Baseball Park" was more commonly used in the media from 1954 to 1960.
