= J. P. Small Memorial Stadium =

Baseball park in Jacksonville, Florida, US

- Jacksonville's First Municipal Baseball Stadium
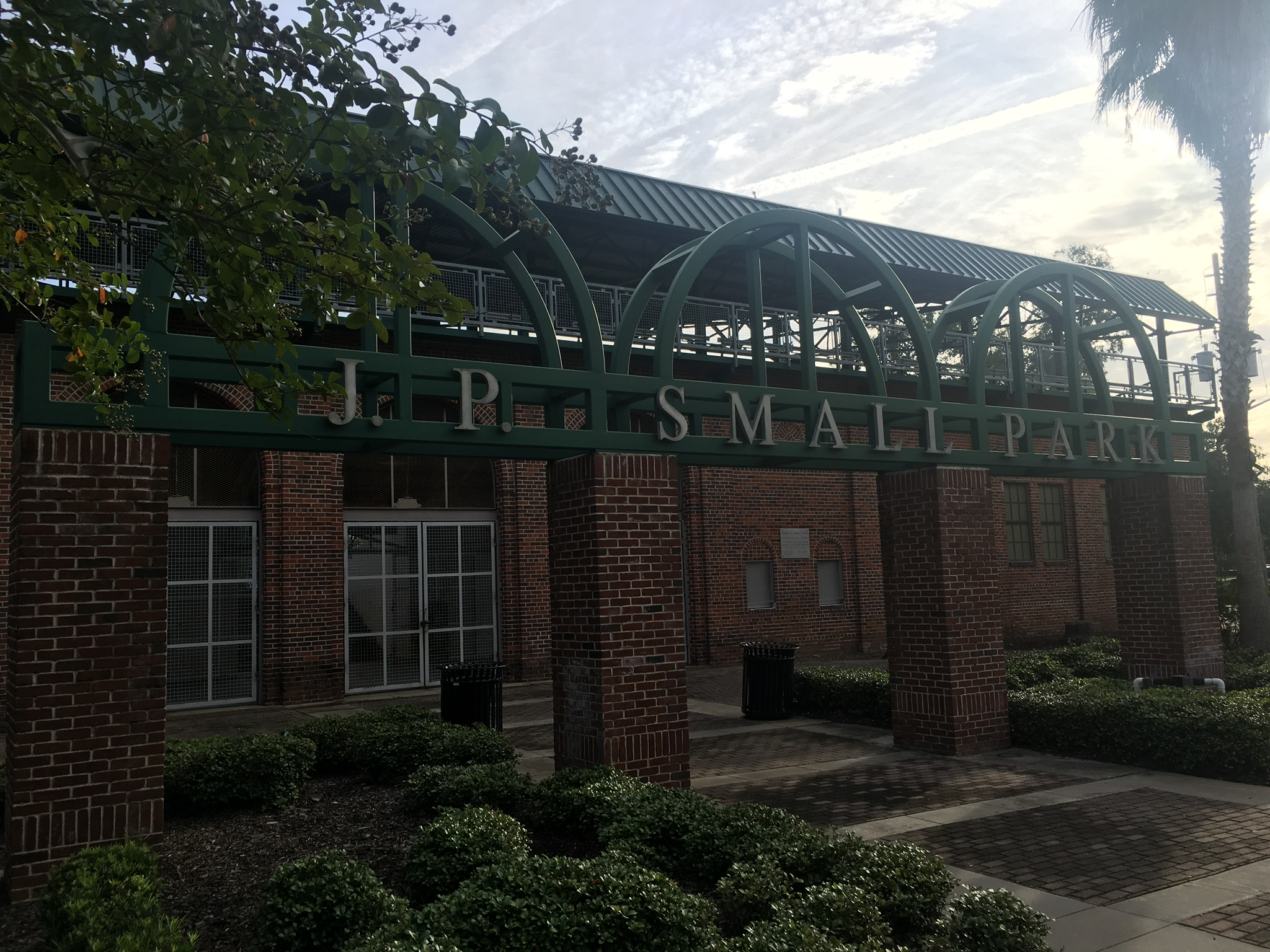
- Interactive map of J. P. Small Memorial Stadium
- Former names: Barrs Field (1912–1926); Joseph E. Durkee Athletic Field (1926–1985); Myrtle Avenue Ball Park (local name)
- Location: 1701 Myrtle Avenue Jacksonville, Florida, United States
- Coordinates: 30°20′47″N 81°40′30″W
- Owner: City of Jacksonville
- Operator: City of Jacksonville
- Surface: Grass
- Field size: Left Field: 337 ft Center Field: 375 ft Right Field: 285 ft

Construction
- Opened: 1912
- Renovated: 1936, 1985, 2006
- Demolished: 1936 (Fire); immediately rebuilt
- Cost: US$

Tenants
- Negro leagues: Jacksonville Red Caps (NAL) (1938,1941-42); Minor leagues: Jacksonville Braves (SAL) (1953); Jacksonville Jets (SAL) (1961); Jacksonville Tars (SEL) (1926–1930); Jacksonville Scouts/Indians (FSL) (1921–1922); Major League Spring Training: Brooklyn Dodgers (NL) (1919–1920, 1922); New York Yankees (AL) (1919–1920); Pittsburgh Pirates (NL) (1918); Philadelphia Athletics (AL) (1914–1918)
- Joseph H. Durkee Athletic Field
- U.S. National Register of Historic Places
- Location within Florida
- Location: Jacksonville, Florida
- Coordinates: 30°20′47″N 81°40′30″W
- NRHP reference No.: 13000484
- Added to NRHP: July 11, 2013

J. P. Small Memorial Stadium is a baseball park in Jacksonville, Florida. It is located in the Durkeeville community in northwest Jacksonville. Constructed in 1912 and rebuilt in 1936, it was the city's first municipal recreation field, and served as its primary baseball park before the construction of Wolfson Park in 1954. Throughout the years the stadium has been known at various times as Barrs Field, Durkee Field, and the Myrtle Avenue Ball Park.

== History ==
=== Barrs Field era ===
The original facility was constructed in 1911–1912 on a patch of land owned by Joseph H. Durkee, a former Union officer during the American Civil War who had settled in Jacksonville, where he became a prominent businessman and politician. In 1911, Durkee's son Jay Durkee turned control of the property over to Amander Barrs, a local businessman and President of the Jacksonville Baseball Association. Barrs ordered the construction of a recreational field to be used by local teams on the property. The facility was completed in 1912 and was known as Barrs Field, but was generally known as the Myrtle Avenue Ball Park to locals. One early tenant was the Jacksonville Athletics, an African-American club for which James Weldon Johnson played. One of the rare professional clubs was the Jacksonville Scouts of the Florida State League, who played in 1921. However, as the city had no municipal park, other teams used fields at the Jacksonville Fairgrounds or across the river in South Jacksonville during this time.

In addition to local teams, Major League clubs including the New York Giants and the Brooklyn Dodgers held their spring training at the field. The Philadelphia Athletics were the first major league team to use Barrs Field for spring training, from 1914 until 1918. In 1918, the Pittsburgh Pirates held their spring training at the ballpark. From 1919 until 1920, the New York Yankees and the Brooklyn Dodgers called Barrs Field their spring training home. The Dodgers would return for one last spring at Barrs in 1922.

=== Durkee Field era ===
The lack of a city park led both major and minor league teams to avoid Jacksonville after 1922. In 1926, the city government decided to purchase Barrs Field from Durkee in hopes of bringing back professional baseball. On March 13, 1926, the city signed a binder to purchase the park, which was renamed Durkee Field. Shortly after this, the city entered into negotiations to bring a Southeastern League franchise to the city. This was successful, and the original incarnation of the Jacksonville Tars was born.

In 1932, the city purchased Durkee Field for $348,000. The original stadium was destroyed in a fire in 1936, but the city immediately rebuilt it in 1936–1937. The new structure was larger, and included a section for African-American patrons in the era of segregation. In 1938 and from 1941 to mid-1942, Jacksonville's only Negro league franchise, the Jacksonville Red Caps of the Negro American League, used the park as their home field.

The Jersey City Giants held spring training at the ballpark in 1946. In that year, the Giants were scheduled to play against a Montreal Royals team that included Jackie Robinson and John Wright, who were in the process of integrating organized baseball. The Giants-Royals game was scheduled for On March 24, 1946, at Durkee Field; however, the Jacksonville Playground and Recreation Board, prohibited "white and Negro athletes" from playing together in their facilities, and George Robinson, the Board's executive secretary, said there would be no game with Robinson and Wright at the park. The Royals, with support from the Dodgers, refused to leave Robinson and Wright at Montreal's training camp in Daytona Beach, and they canceled the game.

In 1953, Jacksonville businessman Samuel W. Wolfson purchased the Jacksonville Tars franchise and reorganized the team as the Jacksonville Braves, a Class A affiliate of the Milwaukee Braves Major League Baseball club. Among the major changes Wolfson introduced was racial integration. Three black players from the Braves farm system – Hank Aaron, Félix Mantilla, and Horace Garner – came to Jacksonville, making the Braves one of the first integrated teams in the South Atlantic League and in the state of Florida. The following year, the city started construction on Wolfson Park, and the Braves moved out upon its completion.

=== Later use and renovation ===
After its replacement as the municipal ballpark, Durkee Field continued to be used by local high schools and colleges, including Edward Waters College, Raines High School, and Stanton High School. By the late 1970s the stadium was in disrepair, and it was scheduled for demolition. Local advocates pushed to save the park, and in 1980 Jacksonville City Council member Sallye B. Mathis sponsored legislation to renovate it and rename it for J. P. Small, who served as a teacher, band director, coach, and athletic director at Stanton High from 1934 to 1969. Renovations included structural repairs, a new roof, press box and dugouts, paving the parking lot, a new playscape, and lighted fields. Councilwoman Denise Lee and Mayor Jake Godbold hosted a rededication ceremony at the park.

Following the demolition of Wolfson Park in 2002, J. P. Small Ballpark became the last historic park in the city of Jacksonville. In May 2003 the Jacksonville City Government pushed forward legislation that would give J. P. Small Ballpark a permanent historical marker. Further renovation in 2006 included a small museum. In July 2013, the park was added to the National Register of Historic Places under the name Joseph E. Durkee Athletic Field.

Modern boundaries of the ball field are 8th Street West (north, left field); Wilcox Street (east, right field); 7th Street West (south, first base); and Myrtle Avenue North (west, third base).
