= Charleston Rebels =

- (1940–1942, 1946–1952); Charleston, South Carolina

Minor league affiliations
- Class: Class-A (1946–1952)
- Previous classes: Class-B (1940–1942)
- Previous leagues: South Atlantic League

Major league affiliations
- Previous teams: Pittsburgh Pirates (1950–1953); Chicago White Sox (1949)

Team data
- Ballpark: College Park

The Charleston Rebels were a minor league baseball club that existed between 1940 and 1952 in Charleston, South Carolina. The club was a member of the South Atlantic League and played its home games at College Park. The club was affiliated with the Pittsburgh Pirates and Chicago White Sox of Major League Baseball. However the club was also briefly affiliated with Atlanta Crackers in 1948.

== Seasons ==
Year	Record	Finish	Manager	Playoffs
1940	16-48 (44-106 overall)	8th	Cecil Rhodes	Spartanburg Spartans (28-58) moved to Charleston July 15, 1940
1941	61-76	6th	Cecil Rhodes	
1942	85-52	1st	Cecil Rhodes	Lost League Finals
1946	65-75	5th	Chick Autry	
1947	83-69	3rd	Chick Autry	Lost in 1st round
1948	87-65	1st	Herb Crompton	Lost in 1st round
1949	68-83	7th	Herb Crompton / Albert Fisher	
1950	79-72	4th	Rip Sewell	Lost in 1st round
1951	75-65	4th	Frank Oceak	Lost in 1st round
1952	78-75	5th	Frank Oceak	
1953	55-84	7th	Frank Oceak (8-30) / Norman Shope (4-5) / Larry Shepard (43-49)	
