= Capital City Stadium =

Stadium in Columbia, South Carolina, USA

- "The Cap"
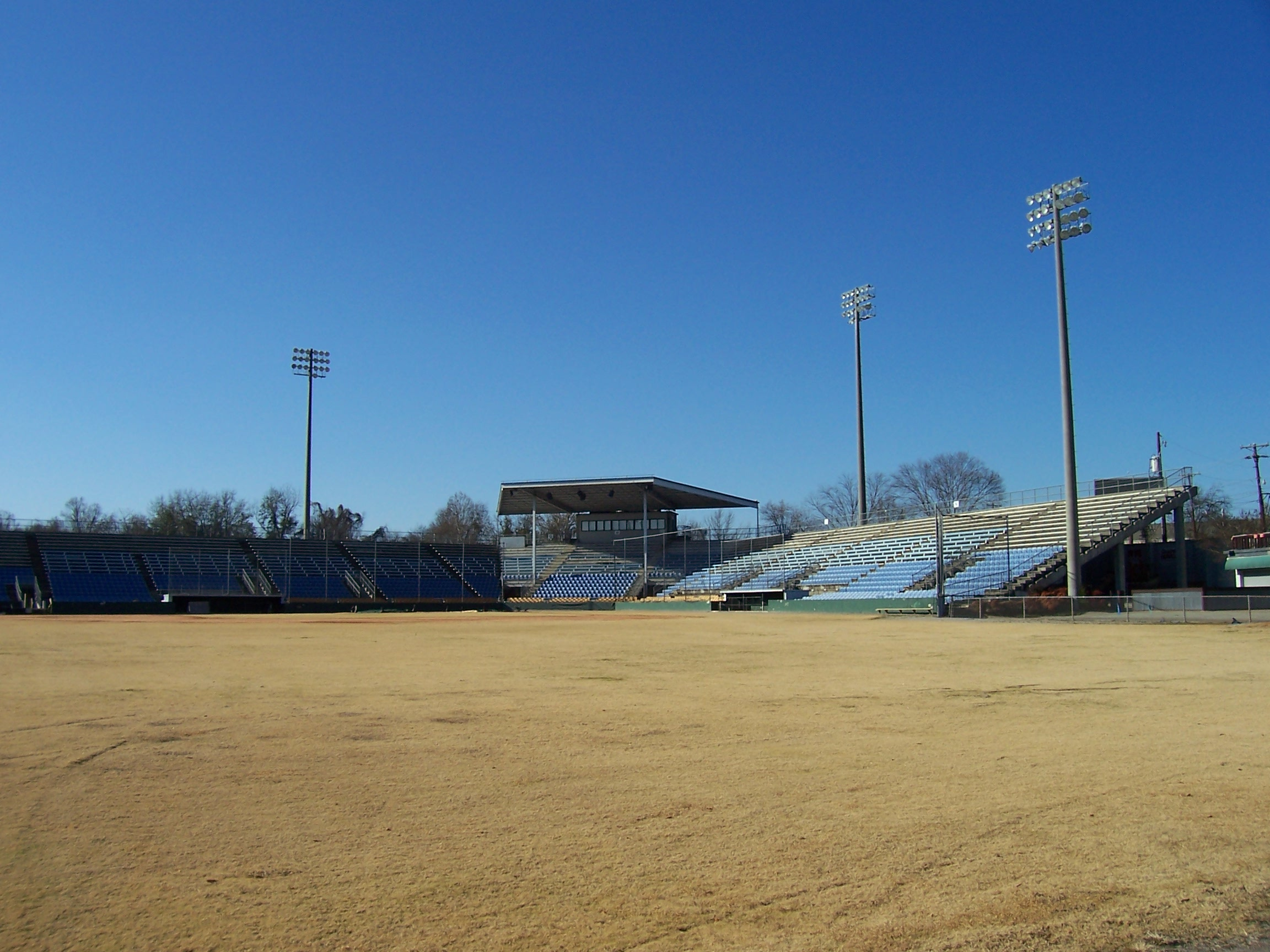

- Location within South Carolina Location within the United States
- Interactive map of Capital City Stadium
- Address: 301 S. Assembly St. Columbia, South Carolina
- Coordinates: 33°59′0.7″N 81°01′42″W
- Capacity: 6,000
- Field size: Left field: 330 ft (100 m); Center field: 400 ft (120 m); Right field: 320 ft (98 m)

Construction
- Opened: 1927
- Demolished: 2020 (planned)

Tenants
- Columbia Mets/Capital City Bombers (SAL) 1983-2004; Columbia Blowfish (CPL) 2006-2014; Benedict College Tigers (SIAC) ?-2014?

Capital City Stadium is a stadium in Columbia, South Carolina, United States. Originally built in 1927, it is primarily used for baseball and was the home for more than 20 years of the Capital City Bombers. It is situated in the Olympia section, near the old Olympia Mill.

While playing at "The Cap" the Bombers and their predecessors, the Columbia Mets, enjoyed a history of success, winning South Atlantic League Championships in 1986, 1991, and 1998.

The stadium was rebuilt in 1991, but in 2005 lost its main tenant, the Bombers. The Coastal Plain League's Columbia Blowfish used the stadium from 2006 until their new stadium was opened in 2015. It had also been used for college baseball by the NCAA Division II Benedict College Tigers, but they left around the same time. Hank Aaron played his last game as a minor league player at Capital City Stadium in 1953 before moving up to the Milwaukee Braves.

In 1995, Capital City Stadium hosted a concert by Hootie & the Blowfish (with Greenville's Edwin McCain, Clemson's Cravin' Melon, and Cowboy Mouth). In 1999, there was the Rock 93.5 Fallout concert there with UK's Bush, Sponge, and Train.

On February 4, 2019, City of Columbia officials announced that the stadium would be torn down "within the next two months" though it remained standing as of June 2019 and the demolition was still in the future as of September 2019. A "closing day event" was announced in March 2020 for April 4, with demolition to follow. The event was postponed due to the COVID-19 pandemic and had not been rescheduled as of August 2020. In October 2020, the Columbia City Council extended the deadline for developers to purchase the property until May 1, 2021, with demolition to follow. These plans eventually fell through, reportedly "after more than a dozen extensions".

The city issued a request for proposals on October 3, 2024, seeking plans to purchase the stadium from the city and redevelop it as a mixed-use project. The submission deadline was November 1.
