= Grayson Stadium =

Sports stadium in Savannah, Georgia, United States

Coordinates: 32°2′41″N 81°4′44″W

- Historic Grayson Stadium
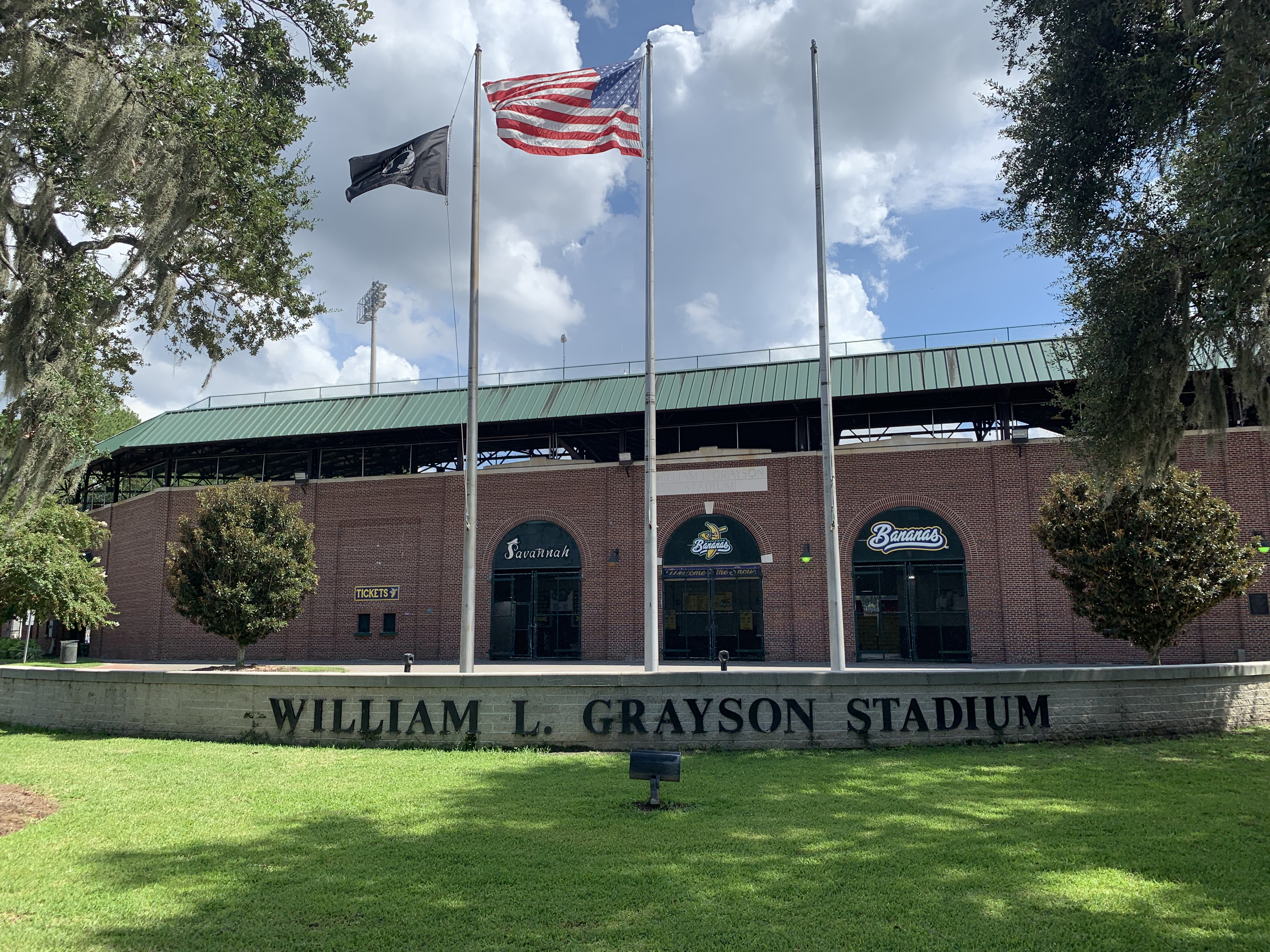
- Grayson Stadium in 2019
- Interactive map of Grayson Stadium
- Full name: William L. Grayson Stadium
- Former names: Municipal Stadium
- Location: 1401 East Victory Drive; Savannah, Georgia 31404
- Owner: City of Savannah
- Operator: Savannah Bananas
- Capacity: 5,000
- Surface: Astro Turf
- Field size: Left Field: 322 ft (98 m); Center Field: 400 ft (120 m); Right Field: 310 ft (94 m)

Construction
- Groundbreaking: 1925
- Built: April 1926
- Renovated: 1941; 2009; 2024
- Cost: $140,000 ($2.55 million in 2025 dollars)

Tenants
- Savannah Indians (SEL) 1926–1928; Savannah Indians (SL) 1936–1942; Savannah Indians (SL) 1946–1953; Savannah Athletics (SL) 1954–1955; Savannah Redlegs (SL) 1956–1958; Savannah Reds (SL) 1959; Savannah Pirates (SL) 1960; Savannah White Sox (SL) 1962; Savannah Senators (SL) 1968–1969; Savannah Indians (SL) 1970; Savannah Braves (SL) 1971–1983; Savannah Cardinals/Sand Gnats (SAL) 1984–2015; Savannah Bananas (BBCL) 2016–present

William L. Grayson Stadium is a stadium in Savannah, Georgia. It is primarily used for baseball, and is the home field of the Savannah Bananas, a baseball team. It was the part-time home of the Savannah State University college baseball team from 2009 to 2011. It was also used from 1927 until 1959 for the annual Thanksgiving Day game between Savannah High School and Benedictine Military School. Known as "Historic Grayson Stadium", it was built in 1926. It holds 5,000 people. It also served as the home of the Savannah Sand Gnats from 1984 to 2015 (known as the Cardinals until 1996).

== History ==
Originally known as Municipal Stadium, it first served as the home field of the minor league Savannah Indians. In 1932, it hosted the Boston Red Sox for spring training. The park underwent major renovations in 1941, following a devastating hurricane in 1940. Spanish–American War veteran General William L. Grayson led the effort to get the $150,000 needed to rebuild the stadium. Half of the funds came from the Works Progress Administration (WPA). In recognition of Grayson's work, the stadium was renamed in his honor.

The first integrated South Atlantic League game took place at Grayson Stadium on April 14, 1953.

The park went through a two-year renovation process that started prior to the 2007 season. Under the Bananas, another round of renovation happened in 2023-24 giving the stadium an additional 1,000 outfield seats - for a total of 5,000 overall and a modernized classic grandstand appearance in preparation for its centennial in 2026. At home plate level, the old bleacher seats in the grandstand used for many years were replaced by stadium-style bucket seating. A video wall is expected to be added in 2025 in the outfield area. In 2020, the Savannah Bananas removed all advertisements from Grayson Stadium.

Grayson Stadium was the venue for the 2017 GHSA Baseball Championships for Class 1A Private, Class 2A, Class 3A, and Class 5A. It was also used for the 2018 and 2019 GHSA Baseball Championships.
