= Savannah Indians =

Minor League baseball team

Savannah Pathfinders
- 1904–1970; (1904–1915; 1926–1928; 1936–1942; 1946–1960; 1962; 1968–1970); Savannah, Georgia

Minor league affiliations
- Previous classes: Double A (1968–1970); Class A (1946–1960; 1962); Class B (1926–1928; 1936–1942); Class C (1904–1915)
- League: Southern League (1968–1970)
- Previous leagues: South Atlantic League (1904–1915; 1936–1942; 1946–1960; 1962); Southeastern League (1926–1928)

Major league affiliations
- Previous teams: Cleveland Indians (1970); Washington Senators/Houston Astros (1969); Washington Senators (1968); Chicago White Sox (1962); Pittsburgh Pirates (1936–1938; 1960); Cincinnati Redlegs/Reds (1956–1959); Philadelphia/Kansas City Athletics (1946–1955)

Minor league titles
- League titles: 1906, 1913, 1914, 1937, 1947, 1954, 1960

Team data
- Previous names: Savannah Indians (1906–1912; 1926–1928; 1936–1942; 1946–1954; 1970); Savannah Senators (1968–1969); Savannah White Sox (1962); Savannah Pirates (1960); Savannah Redlegs/Reds (1956–1959); Savannah Athletics (1955); Savannah Colts (1913–1915); Savannah Pathfinders (1904–1905)
- Previous parks: Bolton Street Park (1904–1909)); Fairview Park (1910–1926); Grayson Stadium (1926–1970)

The Savannah Pathfinders was the original name of the American minor league baseball franchise that represented Savannah, Georgia, during the 20th century.

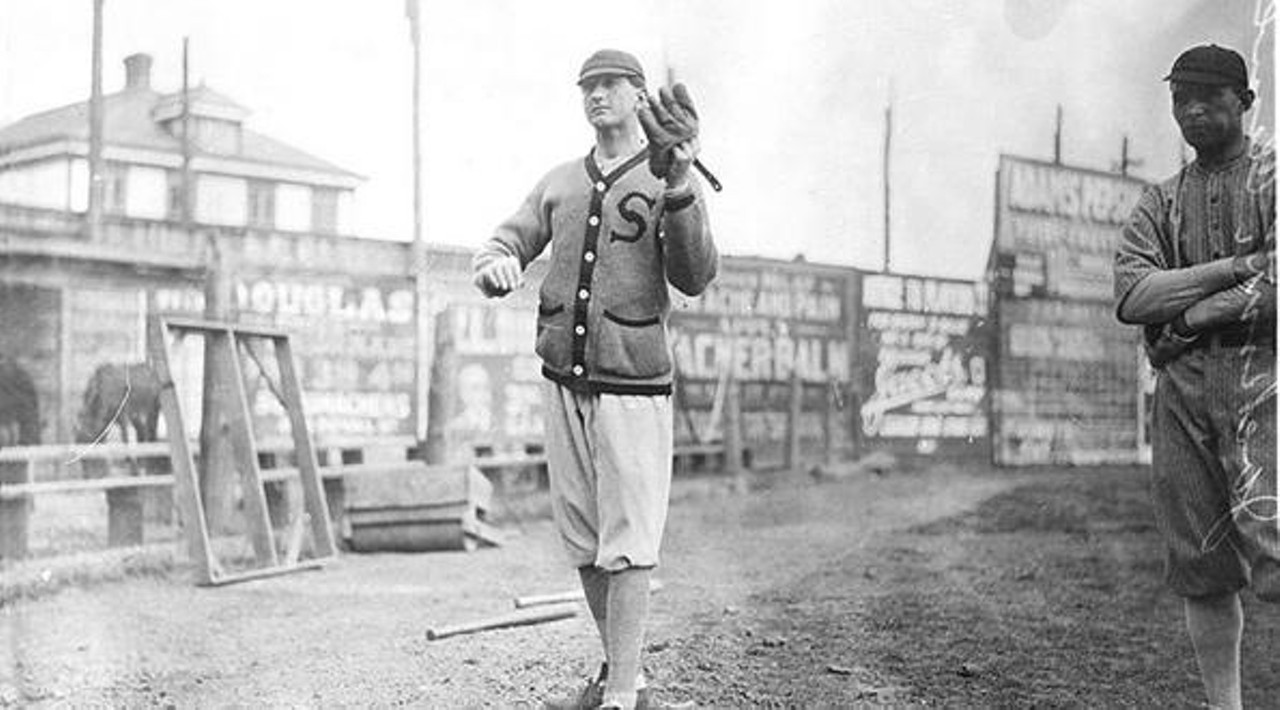
Shoeless Joe Jackson, Savannah Indians, warms up at Bolton Street Park during 1909 season.

While Savannah's minor league teams sported at least ten nicknames during the century, the predominant nickname was the Savannah Indians, which was used for 27 seasons (1906–1912; 1926–1928; 1936–1942; 1946–1954; 1970). The name was not derived from an association with the Cleveland Major League Baseball franchise until 1970, when Savannah served as the MLB Indians' Double-A farm system affiliate. In 1955–1960, 1962, and from 1968–1995, the Savannah team was named after its Major League parent. After 1926, the club played at Grayson Stadium.

For much of their existence, the Indians played in what became the Double-A Southern League, known before 1964 as the original South Atlantic League or "Sally" League. In 1926–1928, they competed in the Southeastern League. The Sally League franchise was founded as the Pathfinders in 1904 and dubbed the Colts from 1913–1915. From 1971–1983, Savannah's Southern League team was called the Savannah Braves, reflecting its link to the Atlanta Braves' organization. When this franchise relocated to Greenville in 1984, it was replaced by the Savannah Cardinals of the contemporary Single-A South Atlantic League; the Savannah team, known as the Savannah Sand Gnats since 1996, moved to Columbia, South Carolina in 2016, and was in turn replaced by a new, independent franchise, the Savannah Bananas.

Between 1904 and 1970, Savannah won seven Sally League championships.

== Notable alumni (1904–1970) ==
- Joe Astroth
- Joe Azcue
- Gene Bearden
- Lou Brissie
- Jack Brohamer
- Don Buford
- Leo Cárdenas
- Donn Clendenon
- Ripper Collins
- Dave DeBusschere
- Art Ditmar
- Bob Elliott
- Nick Etten
- Curt Flood
- Toby Harrah
- Shoeless Joe Jackson
- Ken Johnson
- Alex Kellner
- Al McBean
- Gene Michael
- Bugs Raymond
- Cookie Rojas
- Connie Ryan
- Bob Watson
