= Luther Williams Field =

Baseball stadium in Macon, Georgia

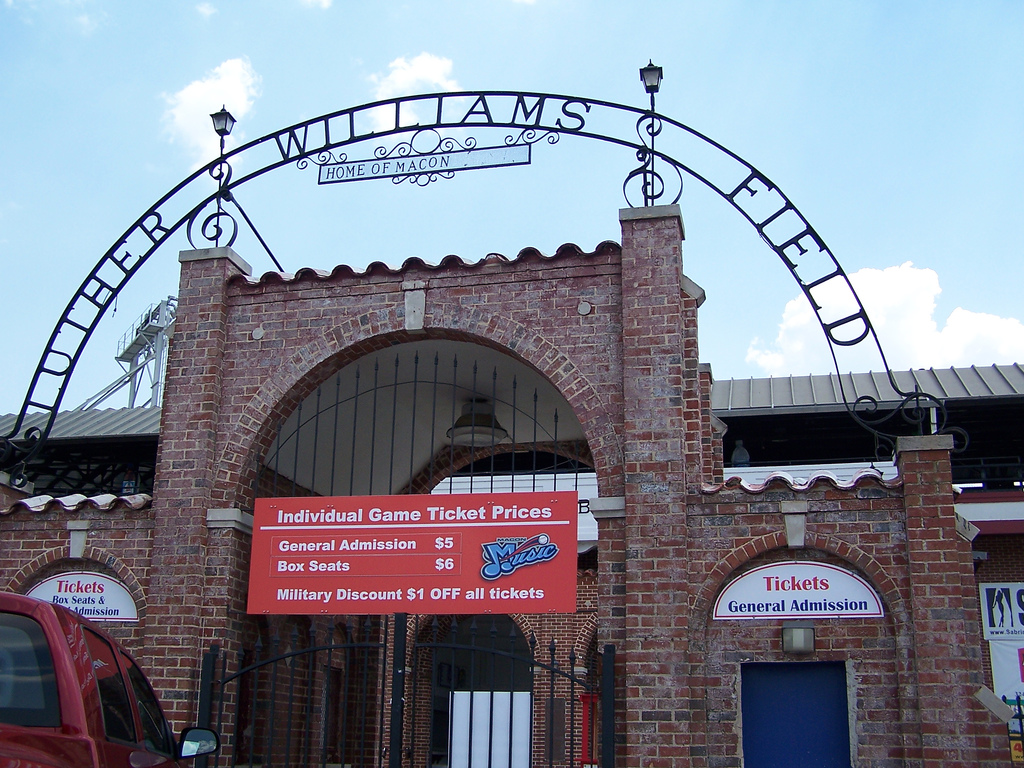
- Interactive map of Luther Williams Field
- Location: Central City Park; Macon, Georgia
- Owner: City of Macon
- Operator: City of Macon
- Capacity: 3,500
- Field size: Left Field: 338 ft (103 m); Center Field: 402 ft (123 m); Right Field: 338 ft (103 m)

Construction
- Opened: 1929

Tenants
- Macon Bacon (CPL) 2018–present Southern Intercollegiate Athletic Conference baseball tournament 2025, 2026; Macon State Blue Storm (club) 2011–2012; Macon Pinetoppers (PSL) 2010; Macon Music (SCL) 2007; Macon Peaches (SEL) 2003; Macon Braves (SAL) 1991–2002; Macon Pirates (SAL) 1984–1987; Macon Dodgers (SAL) 1956–1960
- Williams, Luther, Field
- U.S. National Register of Historic Places
- Location within Georgia Location within the United States
- Location: 225 Willie Smokey Glover Blvd., Central City Park, Macon, Georgia
- Coordinates: 32°49′44″N 83°36′51″W
- Area: 6.5 acres (2.6 ha)
- Built: 1929
- Architect: Curran R. Ellis
- Engineer: Watson Walker
- NRHP reference No.: 04000627
- Added to NRHP: June 24, 2004

Luther Williams Field is a baseball stadium in Macon, Georgia. It was built in 1929 on an earlier ballpark site and is the centerpiece of Central City Park in Macon. It is the home of the Macon Bacon, a wood-bat collegiate summer baseball team in the Coastal Plain League. The original covered grandstand is still in place, though a new tin roof has replaced the former wooden one. A black iron gate surrounds the field, the front of which says "Macon Base Ball Park."

== History ==
Luther Williams Field was home to the Macon Peaches (of the South Atlantic Association, South Atlantic League, and Southern League) on and off from 1929 to the 1980s, and another team by the same name from the Southeastern League in 2003. The Macon Dodgers of the South Atlantic League played at the stadium from 1956 to 1960; the Macon Redbirds in 1983; the Macon Pirates from 1984 to 1987; and the Macon Braves from 1991 to 2002. In 2007, the new South Coast League located its Macon Music franchise at Luther Williams. The team was managed by former major league player Phil Plantier. The General Manager was Ric Sisler, grandson of Baseball Hall of Famer George Sisler.

Luther Williams Field

The venue hosted the 1980 and 1982 Atlantic Sun Conference baseball tournaments, won by Georgia Southern and Hardin–Simmons, respectively.

Luther Williams Field was used for location shooting in the 1976 film The Bingo Long Traveling All-Stars & Motor Kings in which it stood in for a fictional Negro league ballpark in St. Louis, Missouri. It was also used as a location in 2012 for two motion pictures, the Harrison Ford movie 42, chronicling the baseball legend Jackie Robinson, and Clint Eastwood's Trouble with the Curve. It was also used to film baseball scenes in the television show Brockmire.

The stadium was named for Macon's mayor at its opening, Luther Williams, whose family had migrated from South Wales, UK, in the late 1800s. Having an ardent love for athletics, he worked to bring baseball to Macon and helped get the stadium built. Initially unnamed and costing $60,000, the city council soon named the new park after Williams. The first game held there was on April 18, 1929.

== Famous players ==
Numerous Major League stars have played at Luther Williams, whether on their way up the minor league system or as part of Major League teams' occasional stopovers to play their farm teams. Some notable players include:

- Pete Rose (1962 Peaches), MLB all-time hit leader
- Tony Pérez (1963 Peaches), Baseball Hall of Famer
- Vince Coleman (1983 Redbirds) 2× MLB all Star, 1985 NL Rookie of the Year, 6× NL Stolen Base Leader, Member of the Saint Louis Cardinals Hall of Fame.
- Chipper Jones (1991 Braves), Baseball Hall of Famer and 1999 National League Most Valuable Player
- Jermaine Dye (1994 Braves), 2005 World Series Most Valuable Player
- Andruw Jones, Sr. (1995 Braves), nine-time Gold Glove Award winner
