= Jacksonville Braves =

Coordinates: 30.3258°N 81.6398°W

- 1926–1961; (1926–1930, 1936–1942, 1946–1961); Jacksonville, Florida

Minor league affiliations
- Previous classes: Class A (1946–1961); Class-B (1926–1930, 1936–1942)
- League: South Atlantic League (1936–1942, 1946–1961); Southeastern League (1926–1930)

Major league affiliations
- Previous teams: Houston Colt .45s (1961); Milwaukee Braves (1953–1960); New York Giants (1942, 1946–1952); Washington Senators (1937)

Minor league titles
- League titles: 1926, 1956

Team data
- Previous names: Jacksonville Jets (1961); Jacksonville Braves (1953–1960); Jacksonville Tars (1926–1930, 1936–1942, 1946–1952)
- Previous parks: Wolfson Park; Durkee Field

The Jacksonville Braves were a minor league baseball team based in Jacksonville, Florida, U.S. The Class A affiliate of the Milwaukee Braves Major League Baseball team, they played in the South Atlantic League (the "Sally League") from 1953 to 1961. They played their home games at Durkee Field and then Wolfson Park.

The Braves were established in 1953 by Samuel W. Wolfson, replacing the Jacksonville Tars baseball club. They were a far more successful team than the Tars had been, winning the league championship in 1956 and making four other playoff appearances under manager Ben Geraghty. One of the first integrated professional baseball teams in the league and in Florida, the Braves fielded standout players such as Hank Aaron and Félix Mantilla. In 1961 an ownership deal changed the team's major league affiliation, and the Braves were replaced by the Jacksonville Jets for the 1961 season.

== History ==
Two teams named the Jacksonville Tars had played in Jacksonville since 1926, with the last incarnation playing in the Sally League from 1936. The Class A affiliate of the New York Giants, the Tars were described as an unprofessional outfit, and played mostly losing baseball during their run. In 1953 Jacksonville businessman Samuel W. Wolfson bought the Tars franchise, and signed an affiliation agreement with the Boston Braves (who became the Milwaukee Braves very shortly after). The team was reorganized and renamed the Jacksonville Braves. Wolfson retained manager Ben Geraghty, but little else of the Tars survived the transition.

Among the major changes included integration. Wolfson brought in black players from the Braves' farm system, including Hank Aaron, Félix Mantilla, and Horace Garner, making Jacksonville one of the first two integrated teams to play in the South Atlantic League. As such, they were also one of the first teams in Florida to field black players. Aaron in particular was a standout, and was named league MVP in 1953; both he and Mantilla were later called up to the major leagues after their success in Jacksonville.

The Braves drew strong crowds and performed well on the field, proving more successful than the Tars had ever been. They went to the South Atlantic League playoffs five times in eight years, advancing to the finals in 1953, 1954, and 1958, and winning the championship in 1956. They were the impetus for the construction of a new stadium, which opened in 1955 and replaced the aging Durkee Field. The new park was later named Wolfson Park after Samuel W. Wolfson.

In 1957 Wolfson, suffering from ill health, sold the team to a group of businessmen including Bill Terry, who in turn sold it to Texas millionaire Craig F. Cullinan, Jr. When Cullinan won a Major League Baseball expansion franchise in 1960, league rules required the Milwaukee Braves to pull their affiliation with Jacksonville. The Jacksonville Braves came to an end, and were replaced with the short-lived Jacksonville Jets, affiliates of Cullinan's new team, the Houston Colt .45s (now the Houston Astros).

The Jets were not nearly as successful as the Braves had been. They played in Jacksonville for only one year before Samuel Wolfson returned with a new Triple-A team, the Jacksonville Suns.
