= Columbia Senators =

- 1936–1961; (As Columbia Reds, 1938–1942; 1946–1955; 1960–1961; as Columbia Senators, 1936–1937; as Columbia Gems, 1956–1957); Columbia, South Carolina

Minor league affiliations
- Previous classes: Class A (1946–1957; 1960–1961); Class B (1936–1942)
- League: Sally League (1936–1942; 1946–1957; 1960–1961)

Major league affiliations
- Previous teams: Cincinnati Reds/Redlegs (1938–1942; 1946–1955; 1960–1961); Kansas City Athletics (1956–1957); Boston Bees (1937); Philadelphia Athletics (1936)

Minor league titles
- League titles: 1941; 1953

Team data
- Previous names: Reds (1938–1942; 1946–1955; 1960–1961); Gems, Senators
- Previous parks: Capital City Park

The Columbia Senators was the first name of an American minor league baseball franchise representing Columbia, South Carolina, in the original South Atlantic League. Currently, Columbia is home of the Columbia Fireflies in the South Atlantic League.

== History before 1938 ==
Columbia was represented in the SAL — popularly called the "Sally League" — as early as 1892 as the Senators, a reference to the city's status as capital of South Carolina. It fielded Sally League teams from 1904–1917, 1919–1923 and 1925–1930 under nicknames such as the Skyscrapers, Gamecocks, Comers and Commies. The SAL did not operate during 1918 at the height of World War I, and from 1931–1935 during the worst years of the Great Depression. When the league revived in 1936, the Columbia Senators also returned to the field. The team played at Capital City Park.

The franchise was renamed the Reds in 1938 when the Cincinnati Reds of Major League Baseball became its parent team. The team would be known as the Reds from 1938–1942, 1946–1955 and 1960–1961.

== Longtime Cincinnati farm team ==
The SAL shut down again during World War II, but returned to professional baseball in 1946, and was upgraded from Class B to Class A, then a mid- to higher-level classification. The Columbia Reds continued as a Cincinnati affiliate through 1955, but, unlike its MLB parent, the team did not change its name to Redlegs during the mid-1950s. Some of Cincinnati's biggest stars of the 1950s (including Baseball Hall of Famer Frank Robinson, slugger Ted Kluszewski and longtime pitcher/broadcaster Joe Nuxhall) came through Columbia on their way to Major League prominence. However, in 1956 Cincinnati shifted its Sally League affiliate to Savannah, and the Kansas City Athletics replaced them in Columbia with the team renamed the Columbia Gems. The Gems lasted only two seasons before the league contracted from eight to six teams and both Columbia and Columbus, Georgia, lost their franchises for 1958.

Columbia was without professional baseball until 1960, when the Reds came back from Savannah for two seasons before affiliating with the Macon Peaches in 1962. It never returned to the original Sally League (which was promoted to Double-A in 1963 and reorganized as the Southern League in 1964) but joined the modern Class A South Atlantic League in 1983 with the Columbia Mets (1983–1992) and the Capital City Bombers (1993–2004).

The Columbia Reds captured two league playoff championships (1941; 1953) during their history. The 1952 edition, managed by Ernie White, won 100 of 154 regular season games, but was toppled in the first playoff round by Macon.

== Notable alumni (1936–1961) ==
Hall of Fame alumni

- Frank Robinson (1954-1955) Inducted, 1982

Notable alumni

- Bobby Adams
- Joe Adcock
- Jack Baldschun
- Frank Baumholtz
- Jimmy Bloodworth (Columbia Senators)
- George Brunet (Columbia Gems)
- Vic Davalillo
- Sammy Ellis
- Kirby Higbe (Columbia Senators)
- Ted Kluszewski
- Roy McMillan
- Bob Nieman
- Joe Nuxhall
- Don Pavletich
- Harry Perkowski
- Wally Post
- Chico Ruiz
- Al Silvera
- Johnny Temple
- Gene Thompson
- Clyde Vollmer
- Herm Wehmeier

== See also ==
- Capital City Bombers
- Columbia Mets
