= 1959 South Atlantic League season =

- League: South Atlantic League
- Sport: Baseball
- Duration: April 13 – September 1
- Number of games: 140
- Number of teams: 8

Regular season
- League champions: Knoxville Smokies

Playoffs
- League champions: Gastonia Pirates
- Runners-up: Charleston ChaSox

SAL seasons
- ← 1958 1960 →

The 1959 South Atlantic League was a Class A baseball season played between April 13 and September 1. Eight teams played a 140-game schedule, with the top four teams qualifying for the playoffs.

The Gastonia Pirates won the South Atlantic League championship, defeating the Charleston ChaSox in the final round of the playoffs.

== Team changes ==
- The Augusta Tigers disbanded.
- The Asheville Tourists join the league from the Tri-State League, last playing in 1955. The club began an affiliation with the Philadelphia Phillies. Previously, the team played in the South Atlantic Association from 1924 to 1930.
- The Charleston ChaSox join the league as an expansion team.
- The Columbus Foxes re-join the league from the Alabama-Florida League. The club began an affiliation with the Pittsburgh Pirates and were renamed the Columbus Pirates.
- The Knoxville Smokies ended their affiliation with the Baltimore Orioles and began a new affiliation with the Detroit Tigers.
- The Savannah Redlegs are renamed the Savannah Reds. The club remained affiliated with the Cincinnati Reds.

== Teams ==
1959 South Atlantic League
Team	City	MLB Affiliate	Stadium
Asheville Tourists	Asheville, North Carolina	Philadelphia Phillies	McCormick Field
Charleston ChaSox	Charleston, South Carolina	Chicago White Sox	Hampton Park
Charlotte Hornets	Charlotte, North Carolina	Washington Senators	Clark Griffith Park
Columbus Pirates; Gastonia Pirates	Columbus, Georgia; Gastonia, North Carolina	Pittsburgh Pirates	Golden Park; Sims Legion Park
Jacksonville Braves	Jacksonville, Florida	Milwaukee Braves	Jacksonville Baseball Park
Knoxville Smokies	Knoxville, Tennessee	Detroit Tigers	Knoxville Municipal Stadium
Macon Dodgers	Macon, Georgia	Los Angeles Dodgers	Luther Williams Field
Savannah Reds	Savannah, Georgia	Cincinnati Reds	Grayson Stadium

== Map of teams ==
South Atlantic League teams

== Regular season ==
=== Summary ===
- The Knoxville Smokies finish the season with the best record in the league for the first time since 1929.
- On July 6, the Columbus Pirates relocated to Gastonia, North Carolina and were renamed the Gastonia Pirates.

=== Standings ===
South Atlantic League
Team	Win	Loss	%	GB
Knoxville Smokies	78	62	.557	–
Charlotte Hornets	75	65	.536	3
Charleston ChaSox	71	69	.507	7
Columbus Pirates / Gastonia Pirates	70	69	.504	7.5
Asheville Tourists	70	70	.500	8
Savannah Reds	67	73	.479	11
Jacksonville Braves	65	75	.464	13
Macon Dodgers	63	76	.453	14.5

== League Leaders ==
=== Batting leaders ===
Stat	Player	Total
AVG	Nathan Dickerson, Asheville Tourists	.363
H	Thomas St. John, Savannah Reds	148
R	Harry Warner, Charlotte Hornets	94
2B	Ben Tompkins, Asheville Tourists	30
3B	Jose Cesar, Macon Dodgers	14
HR	Cliff Cook, Savannah Reds	32
RBI	Cliff Cook, Savannah Reds	100
SB	Bill Fox, Macon Dodgers	29

=== Pitching leaders ===
Stat	Player	Total
W	Jack Taylor, Asheville Tourists	18
ERA	Jim Proctor, Knoxville Smokies	2.19
CG	Bob Botz, Jacksonville Braves; Jim Proctor, Knoxville Smokies; Duane Richards, Savannah Reds	15
SHO	William Dial, Columbus / Gastonia	4
IP	Bob Botz, Jacksonville Braves	244.0
SO	Ray Daviault, Macon Dodgers	169

== Playoffs ==
- The semi-finals and finals are extended to a best-of-five series.
- The Gastonia Pirates won their first South Atlantic League championship, defeating the Charleston ChaSox in three games.

=== Playoff bracket ===
Semi-finals
1	Knoxville	2
3	Charleston	3
2	Charlotte	2
4	Gastonia	3

Finals
3	Charleston	0
4	Gastonia	3

== See also ==
- 1959 Major League Baseball season
