= 1925 South Atlantic Association season =

- League: South Atlantic Association
- Sport: Baseball
- Duration: April 20 – September 9
- Number of games: 130
- Number of teams: 8

Regular season
- League champions: Spartanburg Spartans

SAL seasons
- ← 1924 1926 →

The 1925 South Atlantic Association was a Class B baseball season played between April 20 and September 9. Eight teams played a 130-game schedule, with the top team winning the pennant.

The Spartanburg Spartans won the South Atlantic Association championship, as they finished the season with the best record.

== Team changes ==
- The Columbia Comers rejoin the league after disbanding following the 1923 season.
- The Knoxville Smokies join the league from the Appalachian League.
- The Asheville Skylanders are renamed the Asheville Tourists.

== Teams ==
1925 South Atlantic Association
| Team | City | MLB Affiliate | Stadium |
| Asheville Tourists | Asheville, North Carolina | None | McCormick Field |
| Augusta Tygers | Augusta, Georgia | None | Warren Park |
| Charlotte Hornets | Charlotte, North Carolina | None | Wearn Field |
| Columbia Comers | Columbia, South Carolina | None | University Field |
| Greenville Spinners | Greenville, South Carolina | None | Spinner's Park |
| Knoxville Smokies | Knoxville, Tennessee | None | Caswell Park |
| Macon Peaches | Macon, Georgia | None | Central City Park |
| Spartanburg Spartans | Spartanburg, South Carolina | None | Wofford Park |

== Map of teams ==
South Atlantic Association teams

== Regular season ==
=== Summary ===
- The Spartanburg Spartans finish the season with the best record for the first time in team history.

=== Standings ===
South Atlantic Association
| Team | Win | Loss | % | GB |
|---|---|---|---|---|
| Spartanburg Spartans | 80 | 49 | .620 | – |
| Charlotte Hornets | 79 | 50 | .612 | 1 |
| Macon Peaches | 69 | 58 | .543 | 10 |
| Augusta Tygers | 69 | 59 | .539 | 10½ |
| Asheville Tourists | 66 | 63 | .512 | 14 |
| Greenville Spinners | 60 | 68 | .469 | 19½ |
| Columbia Comers | 47 | 82 | .364 | 33 |
| Knoxville Smokies | 44 | 85 | .341 | 36 |

== League Leaders ==
=== Batting leaders ===
| Stat | Player | Total |
|---|---|---|
| AVG | Art Ruble, Charlotte Hornets | .385 |
| H | Art Ruble, Charlotte Hornets | 192 |
| 2B | Dale Alexander, Charlotte Hornets; A. Jones, Augusta Tygers | 44 |
| 3B | Art Ruble, Charlotte Hornets; Everett Spikes, Asheville Tourists | 17 |
| HR | Pete Daniel, Greenville Spinners | 29 |

=== Pitching leaders ===
| Stat | Player | Total |
|---|---|---|
| W | Jack Killeen, Spartanburg Spartans | 27 |
| ERA | Harry Smythe, Augusta Tygers | 2.83 |
| IP | Jim Lyle, Augusta Tygers | 310.0 |

== See also ==
- 1925 Major League Baseball season
