= 1930 South Atlantic Association season =

- League: South Atlantic Association
- Sport: Baseball
- Duration: April 21 – September 6
- Number of games: 142
- Number of teams: 6

Regular season
- League champions: Macon Peaches

Playoffs
- League champions: Greenville Spinners
- Runners-up: Macon Peaches

SAL seasons
- ← 1929 1936 →

The 1930 South Atlantic Association was a Class B baseball season played between April 21 and September 6. Six teams played a 142-game schedule, with the winner of each half of the season qualifying for the playoffs.

The Greenville Spinners won the South Atlantic Association championship, defeating the Macon Peaches in the playoffs.

== League changes ==
- At the end of the 1930 season, the South Atlantic Association announced that the league would shut down due to the Great Depression. The league would return in 1936.

== Team changes ==
- The Knoxville Smokies disbanded.
- The Spartanburg Spartans disbanded.
- The Augusta Tygers are renamed the Augusta Wolves.
- The Columbia Comers became an affiliate for the Pittsburgh Pirates.

== Teams ==
1930 South Atlantic Association
| Team | City | MLB Affiliate | Stadium |
| Asheville Tourists | Asheville, North Carolina | None | McCormick Field |
| Augusta Wolves | Augusta, Georgia | None | Municipal Stadium |
| Charlotte Hornets | Charlotte, North Carolina | None | Wearn Field |
| Columbia Comers | Columbia, South Carolina | Pittsburgh Pirates | Dreyfus Park |
| Greenville Spinners | Greenville, South Carolina | None | Spinner's Park |
| Macon Peaches | Macon, Georgia | Brooklyn Robins | Luther Williams Field |

== Map of teams ==
South Atlantic Association teams

== Regular season ==
=== Summary ===
- The Macon Peaches finish the season with the best record for the first time since 1905.

=== Standings ===
South Atlantic Association
| Team | Win | Loss | % | GB |
|---|---|---|---|---|
| Macon Peaches | 87 | 52 | .626 | – |
| Greenville Spinners | 85 | 57 | .599 | 3½ |
| Asheville Tourists | 79 | 61 | .564 | 8½ |
| Augusta Wolves | 68 | 70 | .493 | 18½ |
| Charlotte Hornets | 61 | 78 | .439 | 26 |
| Columbia Comers | 39 | 101 | .279 | 48½ |

== League Leaders ==
=== Batting leaders ===
| Stat | Player | Total |
|---|---|---|
| AVG | Hal Sullivan, Asheville Tourists | .374 |
| H | Red Howell, Greenville Spinners | 193 |
| 2B | George Rhinehardt, Greenville Spinners | 42 |
| 3B | Earl Johnson, Columbia Comers | 25 |
| HR | Jimmy Hudgens, Greenville Spinners | 39 |

=== Pitching leaders ===
| Stat | Player | Total |
|---|---|---|
| W | ??? Harmon, Greenville Spinners | 25 |
| ERA | Phil Gallivan, Macon Peaches | 2.61 |
| IP | ??? Harmon, Greenville Spinners | 301.0 |

== Playoffs ==
- The Greenville Spinners won their third South Atlantic League championship, defeating the Macon Peaches in six games.

=== Playoff bracket ===
| Finals |
| 1 | Macon | 2 |
| 2 | Greenville | 4 |

== See also ==
- 1930 Major League Baseball season
