= 1922 South Atlantic Association season =

- League: South Atlantic Association
- Sport: Baseball
- Duration: April 17 – September 4
- Number of games: 140
- Number of teams: 6

Regular season
- League champions: Charleston Pals

SAL seasons
- ← 1921 1923 →

The 1922 South Atlantic Association was a Class B baseball season played between April 25 and September 24. Six teams played a 140-game schedule, with the top team winning the pennant.

The Charleston Pals won the South Atlantic Association championship, as they finished the season with the best record.

== Team changes ==
- The Augusta Georgians are renamed to the Augusta Tygers. The club was named after Ty Cobb, who played for Augusta in 1904 and 1905.
- The Spartanburg Pioneers are renamed to the Spartanburg Spartans.

== Teams ==
1922 South Atlantic Association
Team	City	MLB Affiliate	Stadium
Augusta Tygers	Augusta, Georgia	None	Warren Park
Charleston Pals	Charleston, South Carolina	None	University Field
Charlotte Hornets	Charlotte, North Carolina	None	Wearn Field
Columbia Comers	Columbia, South Carolina	None	Comer Field
Greenville Spinners	Greenville, South Carolina	None	McBee Field
Spartanburg Spartans	Spartanburg, South Carolina	None	Wofford Park

== Map of teams ==
South Atlantic Association teams

== Regular season ==
=== Summary ===
- The Charleston Pals finish the season with the best record for the first time since 1917.

=== Standings ===
South Atlantic Association
Team	Win	Loss	%	GB
Charleston Pals	80	48	.625	–
Charlotte Hornets	73	59	.553	9
Columbia Comers	72	59	.550	9½
Spartanburg Spartans	63	68	.481	18½
Augusta Tygers	54	76	.415	27
Greenville Spinners	50	82	.379	32

== League Leaders ==
=== Batting leaders ===
Stat	Player	Total
AVG	Ernie Padgett, Charlotte Hornets	.333
H	Ben Paschal, Charlotte Hornets	174
2B	Ernie Padgett, Charlotte Hornets	37
3B	Ben Paschal, Charlotte Hornets	19
HR	Ben Paschal, Charlotte Hornets	18

=== Pitching leaders ===
Stat	Player	Total
W	Charles Brown, Charlotte Hornets	21
ERA	Godfrey Brogan, Charleston Pals	1.94
IP	George Pipgras, Charleston Pals	260.0

== See also ==
- 1922 Major League Baseball season
