= 1960 South Atlantic League season =

- League: South Atlantic League
- Sport: Baseball
- Duration: April 18 – September 6
- Number of games: 140
- Number of teams: 8

Regular season
- League champions: Columbia Reds

Playoffs
- League champions: Savannah Pirates
- Runners-up: Knoxville Smokies

SAL seasons
- ← 1959 1961 →

The 1960 South Atlantic League was a Class A baseball season played between April 18 and September 6. Eight teams played a 140-game schedule, with the top four teams qualifying for the playoffs.

The Savannah Pirates won the South Atlantic League championship, defeating the Knoxville Smokies in the final round of the playoffs.

== Team changes ==
- The Gastonia Pirates leave the league and join the Western Carolinas League.
- The Columbia Gems rejoin the league after they disbanded after the 1957 season. The club began an affiliation with the Cincinnati Reds and was renamed the Columbia Reds.
- The Charleston ChaSox are renamed to the Charleston White Sox. The club remained affiliated with the Chicago White Sox.
- The Savannah Reds ended their affiliation with the Cincinnati Reds and began a new affiliation with the Pittsburgh Pirates. The club was renamed the Savannah Pirates.

== Teams ==
1960 South Atlantic League
Team	City	MLB Affiliate	Stadium
Asheville Tourists	Asheville, North Carolina	Philadelphia Phillies	McCormick Field
Charleston White Sox	Charleston, South Carolina	Chicago White Sox	Hampton Park
Charlotte Hornets	Charlotte, North Carolina	Washington Senators	Clark Griffith Park
Columbia Reds	Columbia, South Carolina	Cincinnati Reds	Capital City Stadium
Jacksonville Braves	Jacksonville, Florida	Milwaukee Braves	Jacksonville Baseball Park
Knoxville Smokies	Knoxville, Tennessee	Detroit Tigers	Knoxville Municipal Stadium
Macon Dodgers	Macon, Georgia	Los Angeles Dodgers	Luther Williams Field
Savannah Pirates	Savannah, Georgia	Pittsburgh Pirates	Grayson Stadium

== Map of teams ==
South Atlantic League teams

== Regular season ==
=== Summary ===
- The Columbia Reds finish the season with the best record in the league for the first time since 1955.

=== Standings ===
South Atlantic League
Team	Win	Loss	%	GB
Columbia Reds	83	56	.597	–
Charlotte Hornets	79	61	.564	4.5
Savannah Pirates	78	61	.561	5
Knoxville Smokies	71	67	.514	11.5
Jacksonville Braves	70	69	.504	13
Asheville Tourists	62	77	.446	21
Charleston White Sox	59	80	.424	24
Macon Dodgers	54	85	.388	29

== League Leaders ==
=== Batting leaders ===
Stat	Player	Total
AVG	Purnal Goldy, Knoxville Smokies	.342
H	Purnal Goldy, Knoxville Smokies	186
R	Dick McAuliffe, Knoxville Smokies	109
2B	Purnal Goldy, Knoxville Smokies	36
3B	Dick McAuliffe, Knoxville Smokies	21
HR	Donn Clendenon, Savannah Pirates	28
RBI	Leo Smith, Knoxville Smokies	111
SB	Chico Ruiz, Columbia Reds	55

=== Pitching leaders ===
Stat	Player	Total
W	Ken Hunt, Columbia Reds	16
ERA	Charlie Rabe, Columbia Reds	2.39
CG	Jack Lamabe, Savannah Pirates	16
SHO	Larry Foss, Savannah Pirates	5
IP	Jack Taylor, Asheville Tourists	211.1
SO	Ken Hunt, Columbia Reds	221

== Playoffs ==
- The Savannah Pirates won their seventh South Atlantic League championship, defeating the Knoxville Smokies in three games.

=== Playoff bracket ===
Semi-finals
1	Columbia	1
3	Savannah	3
2	Charlotte	1
4	Knoxville	3

Finals
3	Savannah	3
4	Knoxville	0

== See also ==
- 1960 Major League Baseball season
