= 1926 South Atlantic Association season =

- League: South Atlantic Association
- Sport: Baseball
- Duration: April 22 – September 15
- Number of games: 150
- Number of teams: 8

Regular season
- League champions: Greenville Spinners

SAL seasons
- ← 1925 1927 →

The 1926 South Atlantic Association was a Class B baseball season played between April 22 and September 15. Eight teams played a 150-game schedule, with the top team winning the pennant.

The Greenville Spinners won the South Atlantic Association championship, as they finished the season with the best record.

== Teams ==
1926 South Atlantic Association
Team	City	MLB Affiliate	Stadium
Asheville Tourists	Asheville, North Carolina	None	McCormick Field
Augusta Tygers	Augusta, Georgia	None	Warren Park
Charlotte Hornets	Charlotte, North Carolina	None	Wearn Field
Columbia Comers	Columbia, South Carolina	None	Comer Field
Greenville Spinners	Greenville, South Carolina	None	Spinner's Park
Knoxville Smokies	Knoxville, Tennessee	None	Caswell Park
Macon Peaches	Macon, Georgia	None	Central City Park
Spartanburg Spartans	Spartanburg, South Carolina	None	Duncan Park

== Map of teams ==
South Atlantic Association teams

== Regular season ==
=== Summary ===
- The Greenville Spinners finish the season with the best record for the first time in team history.

=== Standings ===
South Atlantic Association
Team	Win	Loss	%	GB
Greenville Spinners	98	50	.662	–
Asheville Tourists	80	66	.548	17
Augusta Tygers	80	67	.544	17½
Charlotte Hornets	77	72	.517	21½
Spartanburg Spartans	74	74	.500	24
Macon Peaches	71	74	.490	25½
Knoxville Smokies	68	79	.463	29½
Columbia Comers	40	106	.274	57

== League Leaders ==
=== Batting leaders ===
Stat	Player	Total
AVG	Billy Rhiel, Greenville Spinners	.386
H	Russ Scarritt, Greenville Spinners	243
2B	Russ Scarritt, Greenville Spinners	57
3B	Billy Rhiel, Greenville Spinners	19
HR	Roy Moore, Greenville Spinners	35

=== Pitching leaders ===
Stat	Player	Total
W	Wilcy Moore, Greenville Spinners	30
ERA	Wilcy Moore, Greenville Spinners	2.86
IP	Wilcy Moore, Greenville Spinners	305.0

== See also ==
- 1926 Major League Baseball season
