= 1928 South Atlantic Association season =

- League: South Atlantic Association
- Sport: Baseball
- Duration: April 19 – September 15
- Number of games: 150
- Number of teams: 8

Regular season
- League champions: Asheville Tourists

SAL seasons
- ← 1927 1929 →

The 1928 South Atlantic Association was a Class B baseball season played between April 19 and September 15. Eight teams played a 150-game schedule, with the top team winning the pennant.

The Asheville Tourists won the South Atlantic Association championship, as they finished the season with the best record.

== Teams ==
1928 South Atlantic Association
Team	City	MLB Affiliate	Stadium
Asheville Tourists	Asheville, North Carolina	None	McCormick Field
Augusta Tygers	Augusta, Georgia	None	Municipal Stadium
Charlotte Hornets	Charlotte, North Carolina	None	Wearn Field
Columbia Comers	Columbia, South Carolina	None	Dreyfus Park
Greenville Spinners	Greenville, South Carolina	None	Spinner's Park
Knoxville Smokies	Knoxville, Tennessee	None	Caswell Park
Macon Peaches	Macon, Georgia	None	Central City Park
Spartanburg Spartans	Spartanburg, South Carolina	None	Duncan Park

== Map of teams ==
South Atlantic Association teams

== Regular season ==
=== Summary ===
- The Asheville Tourists finish the season with the best record for the first time in franchise history.

=== Standings ===
South Atlantic Association
Team	Win	Loss	%	GB
Asheville Tourists	97	49	.664	–
Macon Peaches	80	68	.541	18
Augusta Tygers	75	69	.521	21
Spartanburg Spartans	73	72	.503	23½
Knoxville Smokies	73	75	.493	25
Columbia Comers	67	78	.462	29½
Charlotte Hornets	60	86	.411	37
Greenville Spinners	60	88	.405	38

== League Leaders ==
=== Batting leaders ===
Stat	Player	Total
AVG	Oscar Felber, Knoxville Smokies	.366
H	Holt Milner, Augusta Tygers	191
2B	Holt Milner, Augusta Tygers	42
3B	Dusty Cooke, Asheville Tourists	30
HR	Tillie Walker, Greenville Spinners	33

=== Pitching leaders ===
Stat	Player	Total
W	Norcum Rauch, Macon Peaches	26
ERA	Joe Heving, Asheville Tourists	2.46
IP	Roy Mahaffey, Columbia Comers	329.0

== See also ==
- 1928 Major League Baseball season
