= List of Nashville Vols no-hitters =

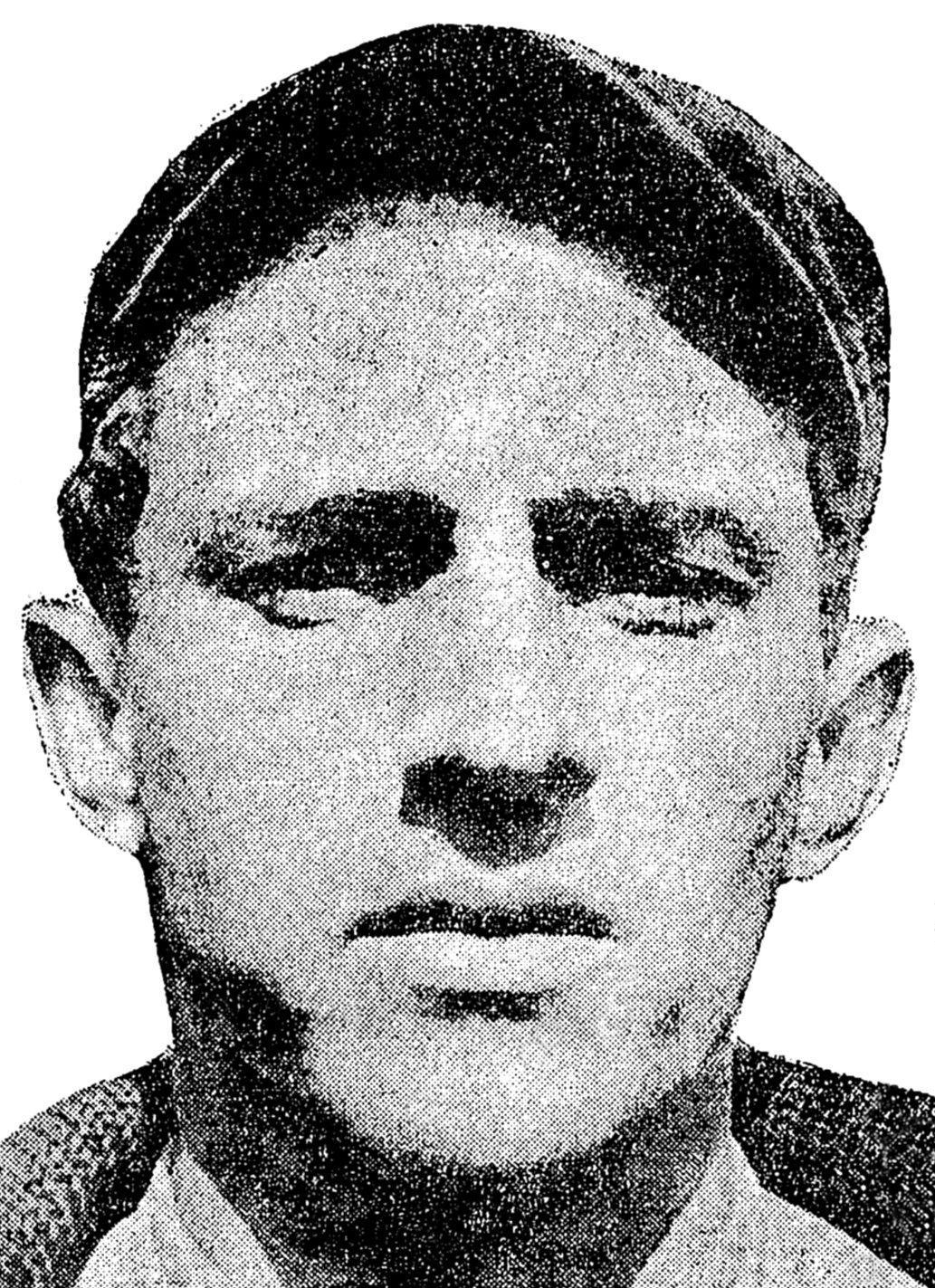
Tom Rogers pitched a perfect game for the Vols at Sulphur Dell in Nashville on July 11, 1916.

The Nashville Vols were a Minor League Baseball team that played in Nashville, Tennessee, from 1901 to 1963. They were established as charter members of the Southern Association in 1901. Known as the Nashville Baseball Club during their first seven seasons, they became the Nashville Volunteers (regularly shortened to Vols) in 1908. Nashville remained in the Southern Association until it disbanded after the 1961 season. The team sat out the 1962 campaign but returned for a final season in the South Atlantic League in 1963 before ceasing operations altogether.

Over the Vols' 62 seasons, their pitchers threw seven no-hitters, which includes one perfect game. A no-hit game occurs when a pitcher (or pitchers) allows no hits over the course of a game. A perfect game, a much rarer feat, occurs when no batters reach base by a hit or any other means, such as a walk, hit by pitch, or error. The feats were accomplished by a total of seven different pitchers. Four occurred at Nashville's home ballpark, Athletic Park, better known as Sulphur Dell from 1908. Three were pitched in road games. Six occurred while the team was a member of the Southern Association and one as a member of the South Atlantic League.

== History ==
The Nashville Baseball Club's first no-hitter was Bill Dammann's 8–0 win over the Shreveport Giants at Nashville's Athletic Park on July 9, 1902, in a rain-shortened five-inning game. The left-hander walked four batters in the first inning, and one Shreveport man reached first base on an error, accounting for the only base runners of the game.

John Duggan threw the Volunteers' second no-hit game on September 10, 1908, against the Little Rock Travelers at Sulphur Dell in Nashville. Only two Travelers reached base, one by a walk in the second inning and the other via a fielding error by third baseman Pryor McElveen in the third. The Vols scored their lone run in the 1–0 victory in the fifth inning when Doc Wiseman came home from third base on McElveen's slow infield hit to shortstop. The club's third no-hitter was tossed by Charlie Case on August 31, 1909, versus the New Orleans Pelicans at Pelican Park in New Orleans, Louisiana. Nashville's Harry Bay led off the game with a double to left field, advanced to third base on Doc Wiseman's out, and came home to score on Walter East's soft ground ball to second base for the only run of the 1–0 contest. Case hit a batter and walked three, while three others reached on errors.

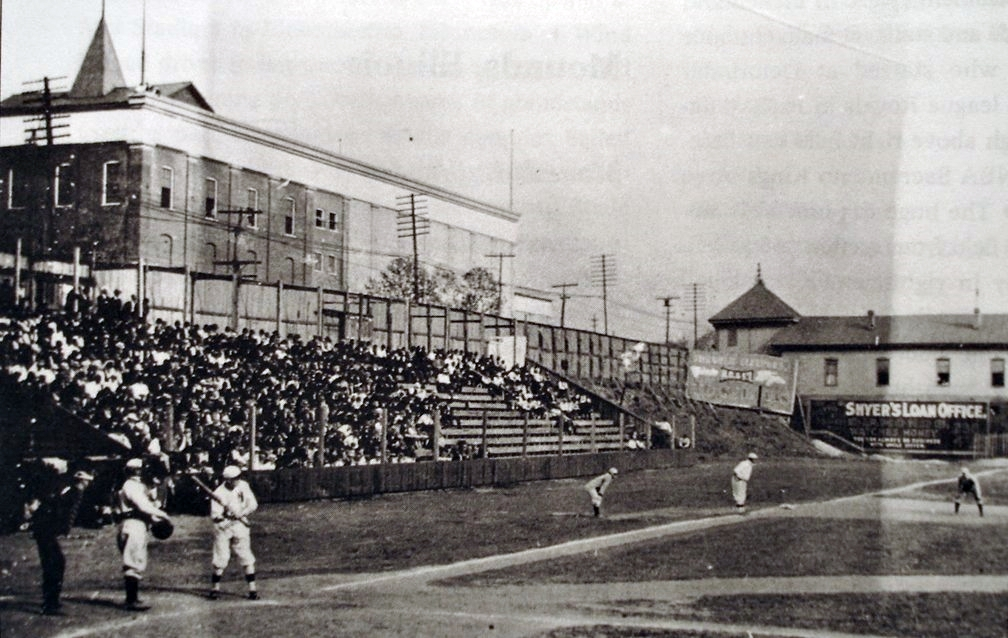
Four of the Vols' seven no-hitters occurred at Sulphur Dell in Nashville.

On July 11, 1916, Tom Rogers pitched the first and only perfect game in team history against the Chattanooga Lookouts at Sulphur Dell. The Lookouts nearly recorded a hit in the second inning when Joe Harris led off with a sharp line drive to right-center field. Center fielder Billy Lee made a diving catch half-way up the notorious Sulphur Dell right field incline, saving the perfect game bid in its early stages. A second defensive play was made by Vols left fielder Gus Williams in the top of the seventh when he crashed into the left field bleacher fence in the act of catching Jake Pitler's sharply hit ball to left. With two outs in the top of the ninth inning, John Peters came in to pinch hit for Chattanooga pitcher James Allen. He hit a soft fly ball to second base, which was fielded by Tom Sheehan for the final out. In all, Rogers struck out 4 of the 27 batters he faced. The game, a 2–0 Nashville victory, lasted 1 hour and 25 minutes.

Thomas "Shotgun" Rogers climbed yesterday to the proudest pinnacle in the baseball world. The Gallatin Gunner, in the most gallant exhibition of slab work ever unfurled in this section of the more or less United States, reported with that fondly cherished dream of every gent who makes the diamond his habitat—a perfect game. One unmarred by either a run, a hit, or a hostile son of swat reaching the initial corner.

— Blinkey Horn, The Nashville Tennessean (July 12, 1916)

Nashville's fifth no-hit game was pitched by Zeke Lohman on July 25, 1920, versus the Atlanta Crackers in the second game of a seven-inning doubleheader at the Dell. Lohman walked two and hit one batsman in the 6–0 win. The sixth occurred nearly 31 years later on July 21, 1951, when southpaw Umberto Flammini fired a 2–0 no-hitter against Atlanta, this time at Ponce de Leon Park in Atlanta, Georgia. He finished one base runner shy of perfection when Alvin Aucoin reached first base on an error after shortstop Joe Damato bobbled the ball in the second inning. Aucoin was retired after the next batter, Jack Dittmer, hit into a force out. Dittmer moved to second on a wild pitch, but the inning ended following a pop out and a strikeout. The game was scoreless until the ninth inning, when Jack Harshman drove in two runs off of Atlanta's Art Fowler.

The Vols' seventh and final no-hit game was Edward Kikla's gem on July 17, 1963, over the Augusta Yankees in game one of a seven-inning doubleheader at Jennings Stadium in Augusta, Georgia. The lefty allowed three runners in the fourth on a walk, an error, and a fielder's choice, but then retired the side and held Augusta hitless for the remainder of the 8–0 win.

== No-hitters ==
Key
Score	Game score with Vols runs listed first
BR	Number of base runners by the opposing team
(#)	Number of innings in a game that was shorter or longer than 9 innings
£	Pitcher was left-handed
†	Perfect game

No-hitters
No.	Date	Pitcher	Score	BR	Opponent	Location	Catcher	Notes	Ref.
1	July 9, 1902	Bill Dammann^{£}	8–0 (5)	5	Shreveport Giants	Athletic Park	Ike Fisher	First Vols no-hitter; First Vols no-hitter at Athletic Park; Largest margin of victory in a Vols no-hitter (tie; 8 runs)	
2	September 10, 1908	John Duggan	1–0	2	Little Rock Travelers	Sulphur Dell	Ed Hurlburt	Smallest margin of victory in a Vols no-hitter (tie; 1 run)	
3	August 31, 1909	Charlie Case	1–0	7	New Orleans Pelicans	Pelican Park	James Seabough	First Vols no-hitter in a road game; Smallest margin of victory in a Vols no-hitter (tie; 1 run); Shortest interval between Vols no-hitters (11 months and 21 days)	
4	July 11, 1916	Tom Rogers^{†}	2–0	0	Chattanooga Lookouts	Sulphur Dell	Gabby Street	Only Vols perfect game	
5	July 25, 1920	Zeke Lohman	6–0 (7)	3	Atlanta Crackers	Sulphur Dell	Bubber Jonnard	Game two of a doubleheader	
6	July 21, 1951	Umberto Flammini^{£}	2–0	1	Atlanta Crackers	Ponce de Leon Park	Bob Brady	Longest interval between Vols no-hitters (30 years, 11 months, and 26 days)	
7	July 17, 1963	Edward Kikla^{£}	8–0 (7)	3	Augusta Yankees	Jennings Stadium	Ray Bond	Final Vols no-hitter; Largest margin of victory in a Vols no-hitter (tie; 8 runs); Game one of a doubleheader	
