= 1939 South Atlantic League season =

- League: South Atlantic League
- Sport: Baseball
- Duration: April 19 – September 4
- Number of games: 140
- Number of teams: 8

Regular season
- League champions: Columbus Red Birds

Playoffs
- League champions: Augusta Tigers
- Runners-up: Savannah Indians

SAL seasons
- ← 1938 1940 →

The 1939 South Atlantic League was a Class B baseball season played between April 19 and September 4. Eight teams played a 140-game schedule, with the top four teams qualifying for the playoffs.

The Augusta Tigers won the South Atlantic League championship, defeating the Savannah Indians in the final round of the playoffs.

== Team changes ==
- The Macon Peaches began an affiliation with the Brooklyn Dodgers.
- The Savannah Indians ended their affiliation with the Pittsburgh Pirates.

== Teams ==
1939 South Atlantic League
Team	City	MLB Affiliate	Stadium
Augusta Tigers	Augusta, Georgia	New York Yankees	Municipal Stadium
Columbia Reds	Columbia, South Carolina	Cincinnati Reds	Dreyfus Park
Columbus Red Birds	Columbus, Georgia	St. Louis Cardinals	Golden Park
Greenville Spinners	Greenville, South Carolina	Washington Senators	Meadowbrook Park
Jacksonville Tars	Jacksonville, Florida	None	Durkee Field
Macon Peaches	Macon, Georgia	Brooklyn Dodgers	Luther Williams Field
Savannah Indians	Savannah, Georgia	None	Grayson Stadium
Spartanburg Spartans	Spartanburg, South Carolina	Cleveland Indians	Duncan Park

== Map of teams ==
South Atlantic League teams

== Regular season ==
=== Summary ===
- The Columbus Red Birds finish the season with the best record for the first time since 1937.

=== Standings ===
South Atlantic League
Team	Win	Loss	%	GB
Columbus Red Birds	83	55	.601	–
Augusta Tigers	83	56	.597	0.5
Savannah Indians	80	59	.576	3.5
Macon Peaches	71	64	.526	10.5
Greenville Spinners	64	76	.457	20
Jacksonville Tars	63	75	.457	20
Columbia Reds	58	81	.417	25.5
Spartanburg Spartans	51	87	.370	32

== League Leaders ==
=== Batting leaders ===
Stat	Player	Total
AVG	Hugh Todd, Jacksonville Tars	.384
H	Augie Bergamo, Columbus Red Birds	190
R	James Adlam, Augusta Tigers	130
2B	Robert Winters, Columbia Reds	58
3B	Augie Bergamo, Columbus Red Birds	18
HR	Danny Pavlovic, Savannah Indians	19
RBI	Hal Quick, Greenville Spinners	106
SB	James Adlam, Augusta Tigers	30

=== Pitching leaders ===
Stat	Player	Total
W	Leo Twardy, Augusta Tigers; Edward Wissman, Columbus Red Birds	21
ERA	Bill Seinsoth, Columbus Red Birds	2.41
CG	Roy Walker, Jacksonville Tars	23
IP	Leo Twardy, Augusta Tigers	274.0
SO	Roland Van Slate, Columbus Red Birds	170

== Playoffs ==
- The Augusta Tigers won their third South Atlantic League championship, defeating the Savannah Indians in four games.

=== Playoff bracket ===
Semi-finals
1	Columbus	3
3	Savannah	4
2	Augusta	4
4	Macon	3

Finals
3	Savannah	0
2	Augusta	4

== See also ==
- 1939 Major League Baseball season
