= 1921 South Atlantic Association season =

- League: South Atlantic Association
- Sport: Baseball
- Duration: April 25 – September 24
- Number of games: 150
- Number of teams: 6

Regular season
- League champions: Columbia Comers

SAL seasons
- ← 1920 1922 →

The 1921 South Atlantic Association was a Class B baseball season played between April 25 and September 24. Six teams played a 150-game schedule, with the top team winning the pennant.

The Columbia Comers won the South Atlantic Association championship, as they finished the season with the best record.

== League changes ==
- The South Atlantic Association was elevated from Class C to Class B beginning in 1921.

== Team changes ==
- The Charleston Palmettos are renamed to the Charleston Pals.

== Teams ==
1921 South Atlantic Association
Team	City	MLB Affiliate	Stadium
Augusta Georgians	Augusta, Georgia	None	Warren Park
Charleston Pals	Charleston, South Carolina	None	University Field
Charlotte Hornets	Charlotte, North Carolina	None	Wearn Field
Columbia Comers	Columbia, South Carolina	None	Comer Field
Greenville Spinners	Greenville, South Carolina	None	McBee Field
Spartanburg Pioneers	Spartanburg, South Carolina	None	Wofford Park

== Map of teams ==
South Atlantic Association teams

== Regular season ==
=== Summary ===
- The Columbia Comers finish the season with the best record for the third consecutive season.

=== Standings ===
South Atlantic Association
Team	Win	Loss	%	GB
Columbia Comers	95	53	.642	–
Charleston Pals	83	64	.565	11½
Augusta Georgians	78	68	.534	16
Greenville Spinners	71	76	.483	23½
Spartanburg Pioneers	61	86	.415	33½
Charlotte Hornets	52	93	.359	41½

== League Leaders ==
=== Batting leaders ===
Stat	Player	Total
AVG	Goose Goslin, Columbia Comers	.390
H	Goose Goslin, Columbia Comers	214
2B	Gus Felix, Charleston Pals	44
3B	Emil Huhn, Augusta Georgians	17
HR	Gus Felix, Charleston Pals	19

=== Pitching leaders ===
Stat	Player	Total
W	Paul Johnson, Columbia Comers	24
ERA	Cy Fowlkes, Augusta Georgians	1.70
IP	Paul Johnson, Columbia Comers	304.0

== See also ==
- 1921 Major League Baseball season
