= 1936 South Atlantic League season =

- League: South Atlantic League
- Sport: Baseball
- Duration: April 20 – September 7
- Games: 152
- Teams: 6

Regular season
- League champions: Columbus Red Birds

Playoffs
- League champions: Columbus Red Birds
- Runners-up: Jacksonville Tars

SAL seasons
- ← 1930 1937 →

The 1936 South Atlantic League was a Class B baseball season played between April 20 and September 7. Six teams played a 152-game schedule, with the winner of each half of the season qualifying for the playoffs.

The Columbus Red Birds won the South Atlantic League championship, defeating the Jacksonville Tars in the playoffs.

== League changes ==
- At the end of the 1930 season, the South Atlantic Association announced that the league would shut down due to the Great Depression. The league returned in 1936 with six teams.

Following the 1930 season:

- The Asheville Tourists , Augusta Wolves, and Charlotte Hornets joined the Piedmont League in 1931.
- The Columbia Comers disbanded in 1931.
- The Greenville Spinners joined the Palmetto League in 1931.
- The Macon Peaches disbanded in 1931. However, the club restarted and joined the Southeastern League in 1932 before disbanding once again.

== Team changes ==
- The Augusta Wolves returned to the South Atlantic League after disbanding following the 1931 season in the Palmetto League. The club would be renamed the Augusta Tigers and became an affiliate for the Detroit Tigers.
- The Columbia Senators joined the league as a new team and became an affiliate with the Boston Bees.
- The Columbus Red Birds joined the league after last playing in the Southeastern League during the 1932 season before disbanding. The club became an affiliate for the St. Louis Cardinals. The club previously played in the South Atlantic League from 1909–1917 as the Columbus Foxes.
- The Jacksonville Tars joined the league after last playing in the Southeastern League during the 1930 season before disbanding.
- The Macon Peaches returned to the South Atlantic League after disbanding following the 1932 season in the Southeastern League. The club became an affiliate for the Cincinnati Reds.
- The Savannah Indians joined the league after last playing in the Southeastern League during the 1928 season before disbanding. The club became an affiliate for the Pittsburgh Pirates. The club previously played in the South Atlantic League from 1904–1915.

== Teams ==
1936 South Atlantic League
Team	City	MLB Affiliate	Stadium
Augusta Tigers	Augusta, Georgia	Detroit Tigers	Municipal Stadium
Columbia Senators	Columbia, South Carolina	Boston Bees	Dreyfus Park
Columbus Red Birds	Columbus, Georgia	St. Louis Cardinals	Golden Park
Jacksonville Tars	Jacksonville, Florida	None	Durkee Field
Macon Peaches	Macon, Georgia	Cincinnati Reds	Luther Williams Field
Savannah Indians	Savannah, Georgia	Pittsburgh Pirates	Grayson Stadium

== Map of teams ==
South Atlantic League teams

== Regular season ==
=== Summary ===
- The Columbus Red Birds finish the season with the best record for the first time since 1916.

=== Standings ===
South Atlantic Association
Team	Win	Loss	%	GB
Columbus Red Birds	97	53	.647	–
Jacksonville Tars	88	57	.607	6½
Macon Peaches	87	64	.576	10½
Savannah Indians	64	84	.432	32
Augusta Tigers	56	94	.373	41
Columbia Senators	55	95	.367	42

== League Leaders ==
=== Batting leaders ===
Stat	Player	Total
AVG	William Prout, Macon Peaches	.342
H	Lee Gamble, Macon Peaches	216
R	James Gruzdis, Columbus Red Birds	147
2B	James Gruzdis, Columbus Red Birds	36
3B	Enos Slaughter, Columbus Red Birds	20
HR	Dee Moore, Macon Peaches	18
RBI	Stanley Tutaj, Columbus Red Birds	129
SB	Lee Gamble, Macon Peaches	51

=== Pitching leaders ===
Stat	Player	Total
W	Arthur Evans, Macon Peaches	21
ERA	John Sims, Columbus Red Birds	2.44
CG	Arthur Evans, Macon Peaches; Jake Levy, Savannah Indians	26
SHO	Arthur Evans, Macon Peaches	6
IP	Jake Levy, Savannah Indians	284.0
SO	Ralph Braun, Jacksonville Tars	172

== Playoffs ==
- The Columbus Red Birds won their fourth South Atlantic League championship, defeating the Jacksonville Tars in six games.

=== Playoff bracket ===
Finals
1	Columbus	4
2	Jacksonville	2

== See also ==
- 1936 Major League Baseball season
