= 1927 South Atlantic Association season =

- League: South Atlantic Association
- Sport: Baseball
- Duration: April 21 – September 14
- Number of games: 150
- Number of teams: 8

Regular season
- League champions: Greenville Spinners

SAL seasons
- ← 1926 1928 →

The 1927 South Atlantic Association was a Class B baseball season played between April 21 and September 14. Eight teams played a 150-game schedule, with the top team winning the pennant.

The Greenville Spinners won the South Atlantic Association championship, as they finished the season with the best record.

== Teams ==
1927 South Atlantic Association
Team	City	MLB Affiliate	Stadium
Asheville Tourists	Asheville, North Carolina	None	McCormick Field
Augusta Tygers	Augusta, Georgia	None	Warren Park
Charlotte Hornets	Charlotte, North Carolina	None	Wearn Field
Columbia Comers	Columbia, South Carolina	None	Dreyfus Park
Greenville Spinners	Greenville, South Carolina	None	Spinner's Park
Knoxville Smokies	Knoxville, Tennessee	None	Caswell Park
Macon Peaches	Macon, Georgia	None	Central City Park
Spartanburg Spartans	Spartanburg, South Carolina	None	Duncan Park

== Map of teams ==
South Atlantic Association teams

== Regular season ==
=== Summary ===
- The Greenville Spinners finish the season with the best record for the second consecutive season.

=== Standings ===
South Atlantic Association
Team	Win	Loss	%	GB
Greenville Spinners	92	56	.622	–
Spartanburg Spartans	81	67	.547	11
Knoxville Smokies	79	68	.537	12½
Asheville Tourists	76	73	.510	16½
Macon Peaches	76	73	.510	16½
Charlotte Hornets	72	78	.480	21
Columbia Comers	65	81	.445	26
Augusta Tygers	52	97	.349	40½

== League Leaders ==
=== Batting leaders ===
Stat	Player	Total
AVG	Virgil Barrett, Knoxville Smokies	.360
H	Teddy Kearns, Charlotte Hornets	191
2B	George Speirs, Greenville Spinners	38
3B	Chick Rossi, Columbia Comers	18
HR	Virgil Barrett, Knoxville Smokies	39

=== Pitching leaders ===
Stat	Player	Total
W	Bill Bayne, Greenville Spinners	26
ERA	Bill Bayne, Greenville Spinners	2.67
IP	Bill Bayne, Greenville Spinners	313.0

== See also ==
- 1927 Major League Baseball season
