= 1940 South Atlantic League season =

- League: South Atlantic League
- Sport: Baseball
- Duration: April 17 – September 15
- Number of games: 154
- Number of teams: 8

Regular season
- League champions: Savannah Indians

Playoffs
- League champions: Columbus Red Birds
- Runners-up: Macon Peaches

SAL seasons
- ← 1939 1941 →

The 1940 South Atlantic League was a Class B baseball season played between April 17 and September 15. Eight teams played a 154-game schedule, with the top four teams qualifying for the playoffs.

The Columbus Red Birds won the South Atlantic League championship, defeating the Macon Peaches in the final round of the playoffs.

== Team changes ==
- The Spartanburg Spartans ended their affiliation with the Cleveland Indians.

== Teams ==
1940 South Atlantic League
Team	City	MLB Affiliate	Stadium
Augusta Tigers	Augusta, Georgia	New York Yankees	Municipal Stadium
Columbia Reds	Columbia, South Carolina	Cincinnati Reds	Dreyfus Park
Columbus Red Birds	Columbus, Georgia	St. Louis Cardinals	Golden Park
Greenville Spinners	Greenville, South Carolina	Washington Senators	Meadowbrook Park
Jacksonville Tars	Jacksonville, Florida	None	Durkee Field
Macon Peaches	Macon, Georgia	Brooklyn Dodgers	Luther Williams Field
Savannah Indians	Savannah, Georgia	None	Grayson Stadium
Spartanburg Spartans; Charleston Rebels	Spartanburg, South Carolina; Charleston, South Carolina	None	Duncan Park; College Park

== Map of teams ==
South Atlantic League teams

== Regular season ==
=== Summary ===
- The Savannah Indians finish the season with the best record for the first time since 1938.
- On July 15, the Spartanburg Spartans relocated to Charleston, South Carolina and were renamed the Charleston Rebels.

=== Standings ===
South Atlantic League
Team	Win	Loss	%	GB
Savannah Indians	94	56	.627	–
Columbus Red Birds	88	63	.583	6½
Macon Peaches	84	67	.556	10½
Greenville Spinners	77	72	.517	16½
Augusta Tigers	77	73	.513	17
Columbia Reds	74	77	.490	20½
Jacksonville Tars	64	88	.421	31
Spartanburg Spartans / Charleston Rebels	44	106	.293	50

== League Leaders ==
=== Batting leaders ===
Stat	Player	Total
AVG	Hooper Triplett, Columbus Red Birds	.369
H	Harry Ashworth, Augusta Tigers	206
2B	Art Rebel, Augusta Tigers	47
3B	Billy Johnson, Augusta Tigers	20
HR	Beverly Ferrell, Greenville Spinners	21

=== Pitching leaders ===
Stat	Player	Total
W	James Davis, Augusta Tigers	23
ERA	Lefty Guise, Columbia Reds	2.06
IP	Alex Zukowski, Greenville Spinners	289.0

== Playoffs ==
- The Columbus Red Birds won their second South Atlantic League championship, defeating the Macon Peaches in six games.

=== Playoff bracket ===
Semi-finals
1	Savannah	2
3	Macon	4
2	Columbus	4
4	Greenville	0

Finals
3	Macon	2
2	Columbus	4

== See also ==
- 1940 Major League Baseball season
