= 1929 South Atlantic Association season =

- League: South Atlantic Association
- Sport: Baseball
- Duration: April 15 – September 7
- Number of games: 150
- Number of teams: 8

Regular season
- League champions: Knoxville Smokies

Playoffs
- League champions: Knoxville Smokies
- Runners-up: Asheville Tourists

SAL seasons
- ← 1928 1930 →

The 1929 South Atlantic Association was a Class B baseball season played between April 15 and September 7. Eight teams played a 150-game schedule, with the winner of each half of the season qualifying for the playoffs.

The Knoxville Smokies won the South Atlantic Association championship, defeating the Asheville Tourists in the playoffs.

== Team changes ==
- The Macon Peaches became an affiliate for the Brooklyn Robins.

== Teams ==
1929 South Atlantic Association
Team	City	MLB Affiliate	Stadium
Asheville Tourists	Asheville, North Carolina	None	McCormick Field
Augusta Tygers	Augusta, Georgia	None	Municipal Stadium
Charlotte Hornets	Charlotte, North Carolina	None	Wearn Field
Columbia Comers	Columbia, South Carolina	None	Dreyfus Park
Greenville Spinners	Greenville, South Carolina	None	Spinner's Park
Knoxville Smokies	Knoxville, Tennessee	None	Caswell Park
Macon Peaches	Macon, Georgia	Brooklyn Robins	Luther Williams Field
Spartanburg Spartans	Spartanburg, South Carolina	None	Duncan Park

== Map of teams ==
South Atlantic Association teams

== Regular season ==
=== Summary ===
- The Knoxville Smokies finish the season with the best record for the first time in franchise history.

=== Standings ===
South Atlantic Association
Team	Win	Loss	%	GB
Knoxville Smokies	85	61	.582	–
Asheville Tourists	84	62	.575	1
Charlotte Hornets	79	67	.541	6
Greenville Spinners	71	73	.493	13
Macon Peaches	69	79	.466	17
Augusta Tygers	68	78	.466	17
Columbia Comers	68	79	.463	17½
Spartanburg Spartans	59	84	.413	24½

== League Leaders ==
=== Batting leaders ===
Stat	Player	Total
AVG	Eric McNair, Knoxville Smokies	.391
H	Odie Strain, Augusta Tygers	202
2B	Abie Hood, Charlotte Hornets	41
3B	Gordon Johnson, Columbia Comers	20
HR	Frank Welch, Greenville Spinners	29

=== Pitching leaders ===
Stat	Player	Total
W	John Walker, Knoxville Smokies	25
ERA	Dick Niehaus, Spartanburg Spartans	2.80
IP	Harold Hillin, Spartanburg Spartans	305.0

== Playoffs ==
- The Knoxville Smokies won their first South Atlantic League championship, defeating the Asheville Tourists in five games.

=== Playoff bracket ===
Finals
1	Knoxville	4
2	Asheville	1

== See also ==
- 1929 Major League Baseball season
