= 1924 South Atlantic Association season =

- League: South Atlantic Association
- Sport: Baseball
- Duration: April 17 – September 9
- Number of games: 130
- Number of teams: 6

Regular season
- League champions: Augusta Tygers

SAL seasons
- ← 1923 1925 →

The 1924 South Atlantic Association was a Class B baseball season played between April 17 and September 9. Six teams played a 130-game schedule, with the top team winning the pennant.

The Augusta Tygers won the South Atlantic Association championship, as they finished the season with the best record.

== Team changes ==
- The Gastonia Comers disband.
- The Asheville Skylanders join the league as an expansion team.

== Teams ==
1924 South Atlantic Association
Team	City	MLB Affiliate	Stadium
Asheville Skylanders	Asheville, North Carolina	None	McCormick Field
Augusta Tygers	Augusta, Georgia	None	Academy Park
Charlotte Hornets	Charlotte, North Carolina	None	Wearn Field
Greenville Spinners	Greenville, South Carolina	None	McBee Field
Macon Peaches	Macon, Georgia	None	Central City Park
Spartanburg Spartans	Spartanburg, South Carolina	None	Wofford Park

== Map of teams ==
South Atlantic Association teams

== Regular season ==
=== Summary ===
- The Augusta Tygers finish the season with the best record for the first time in team history.

=== Standings ===
South Atlantic Association
Team	Win	Loss	%	GB
Augusta Tygers	74	47	.612	–
Charlotte Hornets	73	48	.603	1
Spartanburg Spartans	62	59	.512	12
Greenville Spinners	59	61	.492	14½
Asheville Skylanders	58	63	.479	16
Macon Peaches	37	85	.303	37½

== League Leaders ==
=== Batting leaders ===
Stat	Player	Total
AVG	George Rhinehardt, Greenville Spinners	.404
H	George Rhinehardt, Greenville Spinners	200
2B	George Rhinehardt, Greenville Spinners	45
3B	Cleo Carlyle, Charlotte Hornets	25
HR	Stuffy McCrone, Ashville Skylanders	28

=== Pitching leaders ===
Stat	Player	Total
W	Charles Fulton, Augusta Tygers	24
ERA	Charles Fulton, Augusta Tygers	2.98
IP	Sam Gibson, Asheville Skylanders	284.0

== See also ==
- 1924 Major League Baseball season
