= 1919 South Atlantic Association season =

- League: South Atlantic Association
- Sport: Baseball
- Duration: May 19 – September 1
- Number of games: 100
- Number of teams: 6

Regular season
- League champions: Columbia Comers

SAL seasons
- ← 1917 1920 →

The 1919 South Atlantic Association was a Class C baseball season played between May 19 and September 1. Six teams played a 100-game schedule, with the top team winning the pennant.

The Columbia Comers won the South Atlantic Association championship, as they finished the season with the best record.

== League changes ==
- Following a year of dormancy in 1918, the South Atlantic League returned under a new name, the South Atlantic Association.

== Team changes ==
- The Jacksonville Roses disband.
- The Charlotte Hornets join the league from the North Carolina State League after being dormant since 1917.
- The Greenville Spinners join the league from the Carolina League after being dormant since 1912.
- The Spartanburg Spartans join the league from the Carolina Association after being dormant since 1912.
- The Augusta Tourists are renamed to the Augusta Dollies.
- The Charleston Sea Gulls are renamed to the Charleston Gulls.

== Teams ==
1919 South Atlantic Association
Team	City	MLB Affiliate	Stadium
Augusta Dollies	Augusta, Georgia	None	Warren Park
Charleston Gulls	Charleston, South Carolina	None	Hampton Park Field
Charlotte Hornets	Charlotte, North Carolina	None	Wearn Field
Columbia Comers	Columbia, South Carolina	None	Comer Field
Greenville Spinners	Greenville, South Carolina	None	Furman Park
Spartanburg Pioneers	Spartanburg, South Carolina	None	Wofford Park

== Map of teams ==
South Atlantic Association teams

== Regular season ==
=== Summary ===
- The Columbia Comers finish the season with the best record for the first time since 1916.

=== Standings ===
South Atlantic Association
Team	Win	Loss	%	GB
Columbia Comers	55	39	.585	–
Charlotte Hornets	55	41	.573	1
Greenville Spinners	52	45	.536	4½
Charleston Gulls	49	48	.505	7½
Augusta Dollies	45	52	.464	11½
Spartanburg Pioneers	33	64	.340	23½

== League Leaders ==
=== Batting leaders ===
Stat	Player	Total
AVG	Walter Johnson, Columbia Comers	.362
H	Walter Johnson, Columbia Comers	150
2B	Warren Butts, Charlotte Hornets	27
3B	Warren Butts, Charlotte Hornets	14
HR	Al Wingo, Greenville Spinners	11

=== Pitching leaders ===
Stat	Player	Total
W	Rube Eldridge, Charlotte Hornets	20
IP	Rube Eldridge, Charlotte Hornets	295.0

== See also ==
- 1919 Major League Baseball season
