= 1937 South Atlantic League season =

- League: South Atlantic League
- Sport: Baseball
- Duration: April 17 – September 6
- Number of games: 140
- Number of teams: 6

Regular season
- League champions: Columbus Red Birds

Playoffs
- League champions: Savannah Indians
- Runners-up: Macon Peaches

SAL seasons
- ← 1936 1938 →

The 1937 South Atlantic League was a Class B baseball season played between April 17 and September 6. Six teams played a 140-game schedule, with the top four teams qualifying for the playoffs.

The Savannah Indians won the South Atlantic League championship, defeating the Macon Peaches in the playoffs.

== Team changes ==
- The Augusta Tigers ended their affiliation with the Detroit Tigers and began a new affiliation with the New York Yankees.
- The Jacksonville Tars began an affiliation with the Washington Senators.
- The Macon Peaches ended their affiliation with the Cincinnati Reds.

== Teams ==
1937 South Atlantic League
| Team | City | MLB Affiliate | Stadium |
| Augusta Tigers | Augusta, Georgia | New York Yankees | Municipal Stadium |
| Columbia Senators | Columbia, South Carolina | Boston Bees | Dreyfus Park |
| Columbus Red Birds | Columbus, Georgia | St. Louis Cardinals | Golden Park |
| Jacksonville Tars | Jacksonville, Florida | Washington Senators | Durkee Field |
| Macon Peaches | Macon, Georgia | None | Luther Williams Field |
| Savannah Indians | Savannah, Georgia | Pittsburgh Pirates | Grayson Stadium |

== Map of teams ==
South Atlantic League teams

== Regular season ==
=== Summary ===
- The Columbus Red Birds finish the season with the best record for the second consecutive season.

=== Standings ===
South Atlantic League
| Team | Win | Loss | % | GB |
|---|---|---|---|---|
| Columbus Red Birds | 79 | 59 | .572 | – |
| Macon Peaches | 77 | 59 | .566 | 1 |
| Savannah Indians | 78 | 60 | .565 | 1 |
| Jacksonville Tars | 65 | 73 | .471 | 14 |
| Augusta Tigers | 62 | 78 | .443 | 17 |
| Columbia Senators | 52 | 84 | .382 | 26 |

== League Leaders ==
=== Batting leaders ===
| Stat | Player | Total |
|---|---|---|
| AVG | Jack Bolling, Macon Peaches | .343 |
| H | David Smith, Columbus Red Birds | 184 |
| R | Arky Biggs, Savannah Indians | 106 |
| 2B | Ken Ouzts, Savannah Indians | 37 |
| 3B | Jack Bolling, Macon Peaches | 17 |
| HR | Nick Etten, Savannah Indians | 21 |
| RBI | Herb Bremer, Columbus Red Birds | 101 |
| SB | Cecil Garriott, Columbus Red Birds | 30 |

=== Pitching leaders ===
| Stat | Player | Total |
|---|---|---|
| W | Arthur Evans, Macon Peaches | 23 |
| ERA | Clarence Blethen, Savannah Indians | 2.29 |
| CG | Roy Walker, Jacksonville Tars | 28 |
| IP | Lakey Harkrader, Columbia Senators | 295.0 |
| SO | Lakey Harkrader, Columbia Senators | 133 |

== Playoffs ==
- The league expanded the playoffs to four teams.
- Both the semi-finals and finals were a best-of-five-series.
- The Savannah Indians won their fourth South Atlantic League championship, defeating the Macon Peaches in four games.

=== Playoff bracket ===
Semi-finals
1 | Columbus | 1
3 | Savannah | 3
2 | Macon | 3
4 | Jacksonville | 2

Finals
3 | Savannah | 3
2 | Macon | 1

== See also ==
- 1937 Major League Baseball season
