= 1920 South Atlantic Association season =

- League: South Atlantic Association
- Sport: Baseball
- Duration: April 22 – September 7
- Number of games: 130
- Number of teams: 6

Regular season
- League champions: Columbia Comers

SAL seasons
- ← 1919 1921 →

The 1920 South Atlantic Association was a Class C baseball season played between April 22 and September 7. Six teams played a 100-game schedule, with the top team winning the pennant.

The Columbia Comers won the South Atlantic Association championship, as they finished the season with the best record.

== Team changes ==
- The Augusta Dollies are renamed to the Augusta Georgians.
- The Charleston Gulls are renamed to the Charleston Palmettos.

== Teams ==
1920 South Atlantic Association
Team	City	MLB Affiliate	Stadium
Augusta Georgians	Augusta, Georgia	None	Warren Park
Charleston Palmettos	Charleston, South Carolina	None	University Field
Charlotte Hornets	Charlotte, North Carolina	None	Wearn Field
Columbia Comers	Columbia, South Carolina	None	Comer Field
Greenville Spinners	Greenville, South Carolina	None	McBee Field
Spartanburg Pioneers	Spartanburg, South Carolina	None	Wofford Park

== Map of teams ==
South Atlantic Association teams

== Regular season ==
=== Summary ===
- The Columbia Comers finish the season with the best record for the second consecutive season.

=== Standings ===
South Atlantic Association
Team	Win	Loss	%	GB
Columbia Comers	76	44	.633	–
Greenville Spinners	72	55	.567	7½
Spartanburg Pioneers	56	65	.463	20½
Charlotte Hornets	58	68	.460	21
Augusta Georgians	55	68	.447	22½
Charleston Palmettos	54	71	.432	24½

== League Leaders ==
=== Batting leaders ===
Stat	Player	Total
AVG	Jake Munch, Charlotte Hornets	.364
H	Norm McMillan, Greenville Spinners	148
2B	Lew Wendell, Columbia Comers	29
3B	Bud Davis, Augusta Georgians	17
HR	Norm McMillan, Greenville Spinners	14

=== Pitching leaders ===
Stat	Player	Total
W	Jess Doyle, Greenville Spinners	25
ERA	Leo Townsend, Charleston Palmettos	2.15
IP	Jess Doyle, Greenville Spinners	288.0

== See also ==
- 1920 Major League Baseball season
