= 1923 South Atlantic Association season =

- League: South Atlantic Association
- Sport: Baseball
- Duration: April 16 – September 9
- Number of games: 150
- Number of teams: 6

Regular season
- League champions: Charlotte Hornets

Playoffs
- League champions: Charlotte Hornets
- Runners-up: Macon Peaches

SAL seasons
- ← 1922 1924 →

The 1923 South Atlantic Association was a Class B baseball season played between April 16 and September 9. Six teams played a 150-game schedule, with the top team in each half of the season qualifying for the playoffs.

The Charlotte Hornets won the South Atlantic Association championship, defeating the Macon Peaches in the playoffs.

== Teams ==
1923 South Atlantic Association
Team	City	MLB Affiliate	Stadium
Augusta Tygers	Augusta, Georgia	None	Academy Park
Charleston Pals; Macon Peaches	Charleston, South Carolina; Macon, Georgia	None	University Field; Central City Park
Charlotte Hornets	Charlotte, North Carolina	None	Wearn Field
Columbia Comers; Gastonia Comers	Columbia, South Carolina; Gastonia, North Carolina	None	Comer Field; Gastonia High School
Greenville Spinners	Greenville, South Carolina	None	McBee Field
Spartanburg Spartans	Spartanburg, South Carolina	None	Wofford Park

== Map of teams ==
South Atlantic Association teams

== Regular season ==
=== Summary ===
- The Charlotte Hornets finish the season with the best record for the first time in team history.
- On June 5, the Charleston Pals relocated to Macon, Georgia and were renamed the Macon Peaches.
- On July 26, the Columbia Comers relocated to Gastonia, North Carolina and were renamed the Gastonia Comers.
- Despite finishing in fifth place with a record twelve-games under .500, the Macon Peaches qualified for the post-season as they had the best record in the second half of the season.

=== Standings ===
South Atlantic Association
Team	Win	Loss	%	GB
Charlotte Hornets	89	55	.618	–
Greenville Spinners	77	65	.542	11
Augusta Tygers	73	62	.541	11½
Spartanburg Spartans	74	66	.529	13
Charleston Pals / Macon Peaches	64	76	.457	23
Columbia Comers / Gastonia Comers	44	96	.314	43

== League Leaders ==
=== Batting leaders ===
Stat	Player	Total
AVG	Zinn Beck, Greenville Spinners	.370
H	George Rhinehardt, Greenville Spinners	212
2B	George Rhinehardt, Greenville Spinners	44
3B	George Rhinehardt, Greenville Spinners	28
HR	Ben Paschal, Charlotte Hornets	26

=== Pitching leaders ===
Stat	Player	Total
W	Lee Bolt, Charlotte Hornets	20
ERA	Rufe Clarke, Augusta Tygers	2.91
IP	Roy Meeker, Columbia Comers / Gastonia Comers	306.0

== Playoffs ==
- The Charlotte Hornets won their first South Atlantic League championship, defeating the Macon Peaches in five games.

=== Playoff bracket ===
Finals
1	Charlotte	4
2	Macon	1

== See also ==
- 1923 Major League Baseball season
