= 1938 South Atlantic League season =

- League: South Atlantic League
- Sport: Baseball
- Duration: April 26 – September 5
- Number of games: 144
- Number of teams: 8

Regular season
- League champions: Savannah Indians

Playoffs
- League champions: Macon Peaches
- Runners-up: Savannah Indians

SAL seasons
- ← 1937 1939 →

The 1938 South Atlantic League was a Class B baseball season played between April 26 and September 5. Eight teams played a 144-game schedule, with the top four teams qualifying for the playoffs.

The Macon Peaches won the South Atlantic League championship, defeating the Savannah Indians in the final round of the playoffs.

== Team changes ==
- The Greenville Spinners franchise is reactivated after the team disbanded following the 1931 season when they played in the Palmetto League. The club began an affiliation with the Washington Senators. Previously, the Spinners played in the South Atlantic Association from 1919-1930.
- The Spartanburg Spartans franchise is reactivated after the team disbanded following the 1931 season when they played in the Palmetto League. The club began an affiliation with the Cleveland Indians. Previously, the Spartans played in the South Atlantic Association from 1919-1929.
- The Columbia Senators ended their affiliation with the Boston Bees and began a new affiliation with the Cincinnati Reds. The club was renamed the Columbia Reds.
- The Jacksonville Tars ended their affiliation with the Washington Senators.

== Teams ==
1938 South Atlantic League
| Team | City | MLB Affiliate | Stadium |
| Augusta Tigers | Augusta, Georgia | New York Yankees | Municipal Stadium |
| Columbia Reds | Columbia, South Carolina | Cincinnati Reds | Dreyfus Park |
| Columbus Red Birds | Columbus, Georgia | St. Louis Cardinals | Golden Park |
| Greenville Spinners | Greenville, South Carolina | Washington Senators | Meadowbrook Park |
| Jacksonville Tars | Jacksonville, Florida | None | Durkee Field |
| Macon Peaches | Macon, Georgia | None | Luther Williams Field |
| Savannah Indians | Savannah, Georgia | Pittsburgh Pirates | Grayson Stadium |
| Spartanburg Spartans | Spartanburg, South Carolina | Cleveland Indians | Duncan Park |

== Map of teams ==
South Atlantic League teams

== Regular season ==
=== Summary ===
- The Savannah Indians finish the season with the best record for the first time since 1913.
- The Columbia Reds defeated the Augusta Tigers in a tie-breaker to clinch third place.

=== Standings ===
South Atlantic League
| Team | Win | Loss | % | GB |
|---|---|---|---|---|
| Savannah Indians | 81 | 60 | .574 | – |
| Macon Peaches | 81 | 61 | .570 | ½ |
| Columbia Reds | 74 | 66 | .529 | 6½ |
| Augusta Tigers | 74 | 66 | .529 | 6½ |
| Jacksonville Tars | 70 | 69 | .504 | 10 |
| Columbus Red Birds | 70 | 70 | .500 | 10½ |
| Spartanburg Spartans | 54 | 82 | .397 | 24½ |
| Greenville Spinners | 53 | 83 | .390 | 25½ |

== League Leaders ==
=== Batting leaders ===
| Stat | Player | Total |
|---|---|---|
| AVG | Nick Etten, Jacksonville Tars | .370 |
| H | William Prout, Columbus Red Birds | 196 |
| R | Charles Glock, Columbia Reds | 110 |
| 2B | Nick Etten, Jacksonville Tars; Milton Stroner, Columbia Reds | 40 |
| 3B | Joe Mitchell, Augusta Tigers | 20 |
| HR | Milton Stroner, Columbia Reds | 15 |
| RBI | William Prout, Columbus Red Birds | 110 |
| SB | Cecil Garriott, Columbus Red Birds | 57 |

=== Pitching leaders ===
| Stat | Player | Total |
|---|---|---|
| W | Pretzel Pezzullo, Savannah Pirates | 26 |
| ERA | Leo Twardy, Augusta Tigers | 1.96 |
| CG | Roy Walker, Jacksonville Tars | 25 |
| IP | Pretzel Pezzullo, Savannah Pirates | 288.0 |
| SO | Pretzel Pezzullo, Savannah Pirates | 218 |

== Playoffs ==
- Both the semi-finals and finals were expanded to a best-of-seven-series.
- The Macon Peaches won their fourth South Atlantic League championship, defeating the Savannah Indians in seven games.

=== Playoff bracket ===
Semi-finals
1 | Savannah | 4
3 | Columbia | 3
2 | Macon | 4
4 | Augusta | 2

Finals
1 | Savannah | 3
2 | Macon | 4

== See also ==
- 1938 Major League Baseball season
