= Okmulgee Drillers =

Minor league baseball team based in Okmulgee, Oklahoma

- 1920–1927; Okmulgee, Oklahoma

Minor league affiliations
- Class: Class C (1922–1927); Class D (1920–1921)
- League: Western Association (1920–1927)

Minor league titles
- League titles (2): 1920; 1924

Team data
- Name: Okmulgee Drillers (1920–1927)
- Ballpark: Petrolia Park (1920–1927)

The Okmulgee Drillers were a minor league baseball team that played in the Western Association from 1920 to 1927. They were based in Okmulgee, Oklahoma. They played in two ballparks during their eight years of existence, both of which came to be known as Petrolia Park.

Under managers Whitey Hensling and Ed Brennan in 1920, the Drillers went 83-46, finishing first in the standings. They tied for the league championship that season. In 1921, they had three or four different managers. One source says they were managed by Frank Herriott, Harry Womack and Johnny Wuffli, while other sources indicate that Ed Klepfer managed them as well. They finished seventh in the standings that season, going 71-76. Under managers Wuffli and Troy Agnew in 1922, the Drillers finished fifth in the standings, going 56-79. They improved drastically in 1923 under manager Agnew, going 81-63 and finishing third in the league. They made it to the league finals, but lost.

The Drillers' 1924 team is recognized as being the 49th greatest minor league team of all time. Under manager Agnew, they finished 110-48 that season, good for first in the league. They performed well in the postseason, winning the league championship. They were led offensively by Bud Davis and Cecil Davis, who hit .400 with 51 home runs and 190 RBI and .364 with 51 home runs and 162 RBI, respectively. Joe Bratcher hit .383 with 23 home runs and Bill Stellbauer hit .369 with 32 home runs as well. Their pitcher staff featured three twenty game winners: Guy Cantrell (21-7, 4.57 ERA), Jim Lyle (23-13, 3.97 ERA) and perhaps their best pitcher, Jim Walkup (23-3, 2.60 ERA). Wilcy Moore also went 17-6, and Walt Tauscher went 12-4.

The Drillers would never again match the success they had in 1924. In 1925, they finished with an 80-71 record under managers Roy Corgan and Red Snapp, placing third in the league. Under Chick Mattick in 1926, they finished fourth in the league with a 73-85 record, and in 1927 they finished fifth in the league with a 57-75 record under manager Troy Agnew.

== The ballparks ==
In their inaugural season, the Drillers began play at Petrolia Park, taking over after the diamond had been used as the spring training site for the Omaha Rourkes minor league team from the Class A Western League. Press reports show that this iteration of Petrolia Park, used by the Drillers in their first two seasons, was located on the former Okmulgee County, Oklahoma fairgrounds site on the east side of North Okmulgee Avenue. The fairgrounds grandstand used in 1921 was the same one used in the inaugural 1920 season, but the alignment of the field was tilted further to the right to address concerns that the fans' view of players was being obscured by the late afternoon sun. Although the ballpark sometimes was referenced in terms of its location at the fairgrounds, local press accounts also referred to this field as Petrolia Park.

In 1922, due to dissatisfaction with the fairgrounds site, construction began on a new athletic field to host both the Drillers and other sports activities. The new field was located between North Okmulgee and North Seminole Avenues, just north of what was then the City Hospital, on a parcel that was previously reserved for a park. The hospital was located between North Okmulgee and North Seminole Avenues on the south side of Belmont Street, placing this new field on the north side of Belmont, just a few blocks south of the fairgrounds. Although initially referenced as the town athletic park, the new field soon was being labeled in game announcements as Petrolia Park. The Drillers played at this new Petrolia Park site until the end of 1927, which was the last season of professional baseball in Okmulgee.

By 1952, the later Petrolia Park site had reverted back to use as a city park, known as Hospital Park. The Okmulgee Primary School was subsequently built on the site, and remains there today. The fairgrounds where the original Petrolia Park was located still featured a ballpark as of 1952. The fairgrounds were later altered by Works Progress Administration projects, and by the 1970s the county fair was moved to a different fairgrounds location further to the north. The land occupied by the former fairgrounds now is used as Hawthorn Park, whose amenities still include a baseball/softball diamond.

== Notable players ==
- Jack Mealey (born 1899) -- minor league baseball catcher, who also managed in the minor leagues and served as president of the Sooner State League
