= 1917 South Atlantic League season =

- League: South Atlantic League
- Sport: Baseball
- Duration: April 19 – July 4
- Number of games: 70
- Number of teams: 6

Regular season
- League champions: Charleston Sea Gulls

Playoffs
- League champions: Columbia Comers
- Runners-up: Charleston Sea Gulls

SAL seasons
- ← 1916 1919 →

The 1917 South Atlantic League was a Class C baseball season played between April 19 and July 4. Six teams played a 70-game schedule, with the top team in each half of the season qualifying for the playoffs.

The Columbia Comers won the South Atlantic League championship, as they defeated the Charleston Sea Gulls in the playoffs.

== Team changes ==
- The Jacksonville Tarpons are renamed to the Jacksonville Roses.

== Teams ==
1917 South Atlantic League
Team	City	MLB Affiliate	Stadium
Augusta Tourists	Augusta, Georgia	None	Warren Park
Charleston Sea Gulls	Charleston, South Carolina	None	Hampton Park Field
Columbia Comers	Columbia, South Carolina	None	Comer Field
Columbus Foxes	Columbus, Georgia	None	Columbus Base Ball Grounds
Jacksonville Roses	Jacksonville, Florida	None	Dixieland Park
Macon Tigers	Macon, Georgia	None	Central City Park

== Map of teams ==
South Atlantic League teams

== Regular season ==
=== Summary ===
- The Charleston Sea Gulls finish the season with the best record for the first time since 1914.
- On May 19, the Columbus Foxes and Macon Tigers disband.
- The season was shortened to July 4 with approval from the National Association.

=== Standings ===
South Atlantic League
Team	Win	Loss	%	GB
Charleston Sea Gulls	47	20	.701	–
Columbia Comers	40	28	.588	7½
Jacksonville Roses	33	35	.485	14½
Augusta Tourists	27	41	.397	20½
Columbus Foxes	8	19	.296	27
Macon Tigers	7	19	.269	27½

== League Leaders ==
=== Batting leaders ===
Stat	Player	Total
AVG	Howie Camp, Charleston Sea Gulls	.357
H	Howie Camp, Charleston Sea Gulls	105

=== Pitching leaders ===
Stat	Player	Total
W	Johnny Meador, Charleston Sea Gulls	13
IP	Johnny Tillman, Macon Tigers	185.2

== Playoffs ==
- The Columbia Comers won their first South Atlantic League championship, defeating the Charleston Sea Gulls in six games.

=== Playoff bracket ===
Finals
1	Charleston	2
2	Columbia	4

== See also ==
- 1917 Major League Baseball season
