= Bill Dammann =

American baseball player (1872–1948)

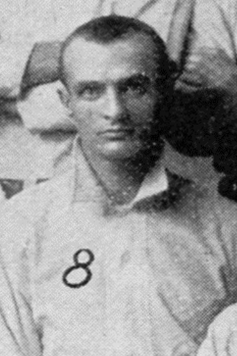
- Dammann with Nashville in 1902
- Pitcher
- Born: August 9, 1872; Chicago, Illinois, U.S.
- Died: December 6, 1948 (aged 76); Lynnhaven, Virginia, U.S.
- Batted: Left Threw: Left

MLB debut
- April 24, 1897, for the Cincinnati Reds

Last MLB appearance
- June 22, 1899, for the Cincinnati Reds

MLB statistics
- Win–loss record: 24–15
- Earned run average: 4.06
- Strikeouts: 74

Teams
- Cincinnati Reds (1897–1899)

William Henry ("Wee Willie") Dammann (August 9, 1872 – December 6, 1948) was an American left-handed Major League Baseball pitcher. A native of Chicago, he played for three seasons in Major League Baseball, all of them with the Cincinnati Reds. His major league debut was in 1897 and he last appeared in the Majors in 1899. In his three seasons, he went 24–15 in 60 games where, starting 38 games and completing 26 with four shutouts.

On July 9, 1902, Dammann, pitching for the Southern Association's Nashville Baseball Club, pitched a 5-inning no-hitter against the Shreveport Giants at Athletic Park in Nashville.
