= Troy Agnew =

- Catcher
- Born: August 8, 1890; Farmington, Missouri, U.S.
- Died: November 23, 1971 (aged 81); Augusta, Georgia, U.S.
- Batted: Right Threw: Right
- Stats at Baseball Reference

Troy Pipkin Agnew (August 8, 1890 – November 23, 1971) was an American Minor League Baseball manager and catcher. His brother was Sam Agnew.

== Playing career ==
Agnew began his playing career in 1914. He did not play in 1916, 1917 or 1918, and in his first year back in 1919 he hit only .144 in 222 at-bats. In ten minor league seasons, he hit above .250 only twice, in 1922 and 1924. He did not play in 1926, and 1927 was his final season. In May 1922, he bought his release from Augusta, with whom he had been playing, and headed to Okmulgee for his first managerial assignment.

== Managerial career ==
Agnew often served as a player-manager.

=== Year-by-Year Managerial Record ===
Year	Team	League	Record	Finish	Organization	Playoffs	
1922	Okmulgee Drillers	Western Association			none		replaced John Wuffli
1923	Okmulgee Drillers	Western Association	81-63	3rd	none	Lost League Finals	
1924	Okmulgee Drillers	Western Association	110-48	1st	none	League Champs	
1925	Augusta Tygers	South Atlantic League			none		replaced by Emil Huhn
1926	Richmond Colts	Virginia League			none		replaced by Guy Lacy
1927	Okmulgee Drillers	Western Association	57-75	5th	none		
1937	Augusta Tigers	South Atlantic League			none		replaced Jack Mealey

Agnew ran the Augusta franchise in the 1930s, buying the ballclub in 1929. Prior to owning it, he served as its business manager. His brother Sam managed. He would later buy the Palatka Azaleas and serve as the business manager of the Sumter Chicks. He served as vice-president of the South Atlantic League for a spell.
