= Jack Kralick =

American baseball player (1935–2012)

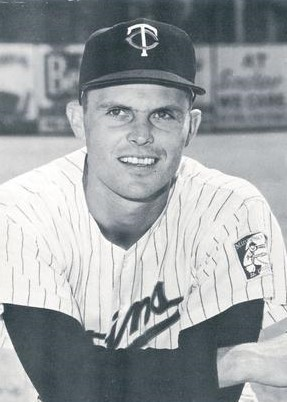
- Pitcher
- Born: June 1, 1935; Youngstown, Ohio, U.S.
- Died: September 18, 2012 (aged 77); San Blas, Mexico
- Batted: Left Threw: Left

MLB debut
- April 15, 1959, for the Washington Senators

Last MLB appearance
- April 23, 1967, for the Cleveland Indians

MLB statistics
- Win–loss record: 67–65
- Earned run average: 3.56
- Strikeouts: 668
- Stats at Baseball Reference

Teams
- Washington Senators / Minnesota Twins (1959–1963); Cleveland Indians (1963–1967)

Career highlights and awards
- All-Star (1964); Pitched a no-hitter on August 26, 1962

John Francis Kralick (/ˈkreɪlɪk/ KRAY-lik; June 1, 1935 – September 18, 2012) was an American professional baseball player who pitched in the Major Leagues from 1959 to 1967. He participated in 235 games in the course of an eight-year career that included stints with the Washington Senators / Minnesota Twins and Cleveland Indians. During that time, he earned 67 wins and 65 losses, accumulating a record of 668 strikeouts, with an ERA of 3.56 in 125 games and 1,218 innings pitched.

== Early years ==
Kralick was born in Youngstown, Ohio, an industrial town with a strong amateur baseball tradition, and attended Michigan State University. Early in his professional career, he gained recognition as a pitcher for a farm team connected to the Northern League. On August 8, 1956, Kralick pitched a 5–0 seven-inning no-hitter for the Duluth–Superior White Sox in a match against the Fargo–Moorhead Twins.

But the parent Chicago White Sox released Kralick during the middle of the 1958 minor-league season, and he was signed as a free agent by the Washington Senators' organization.

== Major league debut and no-hitter ==
Kralick made his Major League debut with the Senators on April 15, 1959. But he appeared in only five MLB games before being sent to the Double-A Chattanooga Lookouts for the bulk of the 1959 season. There he compiled a 3.53 earned-run average in 26 starts and 176 innings pitched. He got into one further Major League contest when the rosters expanded in September 1959 and pitched two hitless innings in relief against the Boston Red Sox on September 27.

He made the Senator staff for the entire 1960 season, posting a winning mark (8–6) and a (3.04) ERA in 35 games during the club's final year before its transfer to Minneapolis–St. Paul.

On August 20, 1961, he participated in the most recent of the six major league games in which two pitchers hit a home run for the same team, with the other pitcher being Al Schroll. Then, on August 26, 1962, he no-hit the Kansas City Athletics 1–0 at Metropolitan Stadium, the first no-hitter in the history of the Twins franchise subsequent to its relocation to Minnesota. He retired the first 25 batters before a walk to George Alusik spoiled his bid for a perfect game.

== Later career ==
Kralick was traded by the Minnesota Twins to the Cleveland Indians for Jim Perry on May 2, 1963. The transaction was made out of necessity for both teams. Kralick, along with Jim Kaat and Dick Stigman, had been one of three left-handers on the Twins' four-man starting rotation, while the Indians' only southpaw starter was Sam McDowell. Kralick was an All-Star in 1964. He played the final game of his major league career on April 23, 1967.

His contract was sold by the Indians eight days later on May 1 to the New York Mets, who were set to assign him to the Jacksonville Suns in preparation for a May 11 promotion to the majors. Instead, he was sidelined for the remainder of the campaign after he sustained a cerebral contusion and temporary diplopia when he lost control of his automobile which crashed into a retaining wall on the Memorial Shoreway near Cleveland Stadium in the early hours of May 2. The Mets offered him an invitation to its spring training camp prior to the 1968 season, but he chose to officially retire as an active player and begin working as an insurance salesman for The North American Life Assurance Company of Toronto.

In 1973, he moved to Alaska, eventually settling in Soldotna with his family, where he served as a pitching coach for the Anchorage Glacier Pilots. In 1988, he moved to San Blas, Mexico.

| Preceded by Bill Monbouquette | No-hitter pitcher August 26, 1962 | Succeeded by Sandy Koufax |
