= Glen Carbon, Pennsylvania =

Unincorporated community in Pennsylvania, US

Glen Carbon
- Populated place
- Location within the state of Pennsylvania Glen Carbon (the United States)
- Coordinates: 40°42′54″N 76°18′40″W
- Country: United States
- State: Pennsylvania
- County: Schuylkill
- Municipality: Foster Township
- Elevation: 1,148 ft (350 m)
- Time zone: UTC-5 (Eastern (EST))
  - Summer (DST): UTC-4 (EDT)
- ZIP code: 17901
- Area code: 570
- GNIS feature ID: 1203678

Glen Carbon is a populated place in Schuylkill County, Pennsylvania, United States.

== Notable person ==
- Jack Mealey (1899-1971) - minor league baseball catcher, who also managed in the minor leagues and served as president of the Sooner State League.
