= George Alusik =

American baseball player (1935–2018)

- Outfielder / First baseman
- Born: February 11, 1935; Ashley, Pennsylvania, U.S.
- Died: April 20, 2018 (aged 83); Woodbridge, New Jersey, U.S.
- Batted: Right Threw: Right

MLB debut
- September 11, 1958, for the Detroit Tigers

Last MLB appearance
- October 2, 1964, for the Kansas City Athletics

MLB statistics
- Batting average: .256
- Home runs: 23
- Runs batted in: 93
- Stats at Baseball Reference

Teams
- Detroit Tigers (1958, 1961–1962); Kansas City Athletics (1962–1964)

George Joseph Alusik (February 11, 1935 – April 20, 2018) was an American Major League Baseball (MLB) player who played five seasons with the Detroit Tigers (1958, 1961–1962) and Kansas City Athletics (1962–1964).

Born in Ashley, Pennsylvania, Alusik stood 6 feet 3 inches (1.91 m) tall and weighed 175 pounds (79 kg). Alusik was signed by the Tigers as an amateur free agent in 1953, but did not get substantial playing time until nine years later. He got two at-bats for the Tigers in 1958 and did not play in the big leagues again until 1961. In 1961, he had only 14 at-bats. In 1962, Alusik was traded to the Athletics and finally got substantial playing time. In 1962, he played in 92 games and had 11 home runs and 35 runs batted in with a .270 batting average. In 1963, he played in 87 games, and 102 in 1964. After the 1964 season, he was traded to the San Francisco Giants, but never played for the major league Giants. Instead, he ended his career hitting .206 in 53 games for the Tacoma Giants.

Until Frank Thomas broke the record for home runs in consecutive games by an Athletics player, Alusik was one of three Athletics players who held the record of hitting home runs in five consecutive games.

On August 26, 1962, Alusik broke up a perfect game in the 9th inning against Twins pitcher Jack Kralick. Alusik also beat Kralick with a two-run home run on August 8, 1962.

Alusik's Topps 1962 Rookie card was featured in the 2000 film Skipped Parts as part of a baby's mobile at the end of the film.

Alusik died on April 20, 2018.
