= Alton Biggs =

American baseball player

Carlos Alton Biggs (April 14, 1912 – May 14, 1981) was a long-time minor league baseball infielder who spent seven seasons as a player-manager. Nicknamed Arky, he was born in Greenbrier, Arkansas, United States.

According to Baseball Reference Minors, he first played professionally in 1924 at the age of 15. He next played in 1934 and last played in 1951, at the age of 42. As a player, he collected over 2,300 hits while hitting approximately .286.

He first managed the Augusta Tigers in 1941, replacing Ernie Jenkins partway through the season. He managed the Tigers again in 1942, being replaced by Wally Schang partway through that year. He next managed the Phoenix Senators in 1947 and 1948. In 1949, he returned to the Augusta Tigers, eventually begin replaced by Jim Pruett. He managed the Sumter Chicks in 1950, being replaced by Vance Carlson partway through the season. In 1951, he managed the Greenville Bucks, being replaced by Lawrence Bucynski partway through the year.
