= Petrolia Park =

Baseball park in Okmulgee, Oklahoma, U.S.

Petrolia Park was the name given to two ballparks located in Okmulgee, Oklahoma, United States. These ballparks served as the home fields of the Okmulgee Merchants, a Negro league baseball team, as well as the Okmulgee Drillers of the Western Association.

References to Petrolia Park appear as early as March 1920, when the Omaha Rourkes minor league team from the Class A Western League used Okmulgee's baseball field as a spring training site. Petrolia Park hosted several spring training games between Omaha and other upper-level professional teams during that time, including two contests against the St. Louis Browns of the American League. At the end of their 1920 spring training season, Omaha handed over use of Petrolia Park to the newly formed Okmulgee Drillers of the Class D Western Association.

Press reports show that the Petrolia Park facility used by the Okmulgee Drillers in their first two seasons was located on the former Okmulgee County, Oklahoma fairgrounds site on the east side of North Okmulgee Avenue. The fairgrounds grandstand used in 1921 was the same one used in the inaugural 1920 season, but the alignment of the field was tilted further to the right to address concerns that the fans' view of players was being obscured by the late afternoon sun. A 1920 map offering a partial view of the western side of the fairgrounds shows a grandstand for the race track, which faces east. Accounts of the 1921 field alignment, however, indicate that the Petrolia Park baseball grandstand faced west into the setting sun, and thus must have been separate from the race track grandstand depicted on the map. While sometimes referenced in terms of its location at the fairgrounds, local press accounts did also refer to this field as Petrolia Park.

In 1922, citing dissatisfaction with the fairgrounds site, the City of Okmulgee authorized construction of a new athletic field to host both the Drillers and other sports activities. The new field was located between North Okmulgee and North Seminole Avenues, just north of what was then the City Hospital, on a parcel that was previously reserved for a park. The hospital was located between North Okmulgee and North Seminole Avenues on the south side of Belmont Street, placing this new field on the north side of Belmont, just a few blocks south of the fairgrounds. Although initially referenced as the town athletic park, the new field soon was being labeled in game announcements as Petrolia Park. When not in use for baseball, the new Petrolia Park hosted football and track and field events for the local high school.

In 1926, the Okmulgee Board of Education acquired land at the intersection of East 12th Street and Creek Avenue from New York philanthropist William E. Harmon and a local citizen, where it developed a new athletic field for high school sports. That field, which originally was outfitted with wooden bleachers, was later improved by the Works Progress Administration by adding a stone grandstand and other buildings. That complex comprises today's Harmon Athletic Field, which is listed on the National Register of Historic Places and still hosts Okmulgee High School football games. A year later, in 1927, the Okmulgee Drillers played their final game at Petrolia Park, completing the last season of professional baseball in Okmulgee.

Although Petrolia Park was no longer used for Drillers games or high school sporting events after 1927, it did continue to host home games for the Okmulgee Merchants for a few additional years. In 1929, the Merchants won the Okmulgee-Hughes-Okfuskee (O-H-O) Tri-County league championship, claiming the crown after the league was disbanded in August of that year. The Merchants also hosted exhibition games at Petrolia Park against the Kansas City Monarchs of the Negro National League, including a 1929 game in which the league champion Merchants defeated the Monarchs in extra innings. The 1929 Monarchs, whom the Merchants defeated, were led by player-manager Bullet Rogan, a member of the Major League Baseball Hall of Fame, and were champions of the Negro National League. The 1930 Monarchs, who got revenge with a 11-1 defeat of the Merchants at Petrolia Park, were managed by Rogan and Dink Mothell and finished second in their league that year. Mothell also played in the 1929 exhibition game and helped turn a triple play in the field.

By 1952, the later Petrolia Park site had reverted back to use as a city park, known as Hospital Park. The Okmulgee Primary School was subsequently built on the site, and remains there today. The fairgrounds where the original Petrolia Park was located still featured a ballpark as of 1952. The fairgrounds were later altered by Works Progress Administration projects, and by the 1970s the county fair was moved to a different fairgrounds location further to the north. The land occupied by the former fairgrounds now is used as Hawthorn Park, whose amenities still include a baseball/softball diamond.
