= Ernie Jenkins (baseball) =

Ernest Lafayette "Lefty" Jenkins (December 26, 1906 – February 12, 1978) was a minor league baseball pitcher and manager. He managed in the New York Yankees system from 1935 to 1939. He died in California, aged 71.

== Career ==
=== Baseball player ===
Jenkins was born in Gastonia, North Carolina. As a pitcher, he spent 10 non-consecutive seasons playing from 1930 to 1946, going 77–51 in that time. In 1935 with the Bassett Furnituremakers, he went 21–9 in 44 appearances. He also managed for the first time that season, leading the Furnituremakers to the playoffs, though they lost the league finals. At the helm again in 1936, he led the Furnituremakers to a league championship - the first year of four in a row in which he led his team to the championship. In 1937 to 1938 it was the Butler Yankees and in 1939 it was the Augusta Tigers.

=== Baseball manager ===
He managed the Utica Braves in 1940 and the Tigers again in 1941, getting replaced by Alton Biggs. His last managerial stint was in 1950, being replaced by Lyle Judy.
