= Jack Mealey =

- Catcher
- Born: April 28, 1899; Glen Carbon, Pennsylvania, U.S.
- Died: August 1971 (aged 72)
- Batted: Right Threw: Right

debut
- 1922, for the Joplin Miners

Last appearance
- 1944, for the Muskogee Reds
- Stats at Baseball Reference

Career highlights and awards
- Western League All Star (Wichita Aviators; 1930); Manager ( Galveston Buccaneers (1935–36); Augusta Tigers (1937); Jackson Senators (1937); Muskogee Reds (1940–42); President of the Sooner State League

Maurice F. "Jack" Mealey (April 28, 1899 – August 1971) was an American long-time minor league baseball catcher, who also managed in the minor leagues and served as president of the Sooner State League for five years. He was born in Glen Carbon, Pennsylvania.

== Playing career ==
Mealey began his professional career in 1922, playing for the Okmulgee Drillers and Joplin Miners, hitting a combined .248 in 73 games. In 1923, he played for Okmulgee again, upping his batting average to .264 in 70 games. From 1924 to 1926, he played for the Asheville Tourists, hitting .276 in 99 games in 1924, .304 with a career high 13 home runs in 103 games in 1925 and .258 with 10 home runs in 113 games in 1926. Back with Okmulgee in 1927, he hit .337 with 10 home runs in 111 games.

He split 1928 between the Independence Producers and Dallas Steers, hitting .269 in 65 games overall, and garnering a tryout with the White Sox in the fall. With the Steers again in 1929, he hit only .239 in 72 games, but according to The Pittsburgh Press he "had a lot to do with that club's winning the Texas League pennant", and had a .983 fielding percentage. In 1930, Mealey played for the Wichita Aviators, hitting .279 in 84 games, earning a spot on the Western League All-Star team. The Pittsburgh Press described him in 1931 as a "Western League luminary", who had "earned a high reputation in the Western League for his cleverness and cool-headedness.... it is in gauging just what is best for his battery partner that Mealey shines."

Mealey made it to the Major Leagues in 1931 with the Pittsburgh Pirates, but did not officially play in any games for almost two months. On June 13, Mealey was released by the Pirates. He played the rest of the season with the San Francisco Seals, hitting .242. With the San Antonio Indians in 1932, Mealey hit .246 in 84 games.

From 1933 to 1936 he played for the Galveston Buccaneers and later became a player-manager in 1935. From 1933 to 1934 he served as assistant to the previous coach, Billy Webb. He hit only .218 in 1933. In 1934, he upped his batting average to .233, and in 1935 he raised it again to .281.

Mealey resigned from his position as manager on after being suspended for a melee on May 29, 1936, where Mealey tried to help teammate Jack Jakucki fight several fans in the stands. Mealey finished the 1936 season with the Tulsa Oilers, hitting a combined .270 in 56 games that season. He played for the Jackson Senators and Augusta Tigers in 1937, hitting a combined .270 in 87 games. With the Oilers again in 1938, he hit only .173 in 33 games.

He didn't play professionally in 1939, although he played from 1940 to 1942 for the Muskogee Reds. In 1940, he hit .228 in 80 games, in 1941 he hit .268 in 76 games, and in 1942 he hit .299 in 31 games. He retired from professional baseball after 1942, at age 43.

Overall, Mealey spent 20 seasons in the minors, hitting .263 in 1,538 games. In 4,857 at-bats, he collected 1,279 hits – 263 of which were doubles, 52 of which were triples and 77 of which were home runs.

== Managerial career ==
Mealey spent a few years as a player-manager.

=== Year-by-Year Managerial Record ===
Year	Team	League	Record	Finish	Organization	Playoffs	
1935	Galveston Buccaneers	Texas League	86–75	3rd	none	Lost in 1st round	
1936	Galveston Buccaneers	Texas League	15–27	–	none	–	replaced by Jake Atz (42–69) May 29
1937	Augusta Tigers	South Atlantic League		–	New York Yankees	–	replaced by Troy Agnew
	Jackson Senators	Southeastern League		4th	New York Yankees	Lost in 1st round	replaced Ike Boone
1940	Muskogee Reds	Western Association	90–49	1st	none	Lost in 1st round	
1941	Muskogee Reds	Western Association	64–69	5th	Chicago Cubs		
1942	Muskogee Reds	Western Association	76–58	2nd	none		
