= Bob Botz =

American baseball player (born 1935)

- Pitcher
- Born: April 28, 1935 (age 91); Milwaukee, Wisconsin, U.S.
- Batted: Right Threw: Right

MLB debut
- May 8, 1962, for the Los Angeles Angels

Last MLB appearance
- September 29, 1962, for the Los Angeles Angels

MLB statistics
- Win–loss record: 2–1
- Earned run average: 3.43
- Strikeouts: 24
- Stats at Baseball Reference

Teams
- Los Angeles Angels (1962)

Robert Allen Botz (born April 28, 1935) is an American former Major League Baseball relief pitcher. The 5 ft 11 in (1.80 m), 170 lb (77 kg) right-hander was signed by the Milwaukee Braves as an amateur free agent before the 1955 season. He was acquired by the Los Angeles Angels from Milwaukee on May 3, 1962, and played for the Angels the rest of that season.

== Career ==
Botz made his major league debut on May 8, 1962, against the Detroit Tigers at Dodger Stadium. He pitched three scoreless innings in the 10–1 Angels loss. He struck out two batters, Bill Bruton and Al Kaline. He earned his first big league save on June 20 in a road game against the Kansas City Athletics, and got his first win exactly one month later in a home game vs. the Cleveland Indians.

Season and career totals include 35 games pitched, all in relief, a 2–1 record, 13 games finished, and 2 saves. In 63 innings pitched he allowed 71 hits and only 11 walks for a WHIP of 1.302. He struck out 24 and had an earned run average of 3.43.

In April 1963 Botz was traded to the St. Louis Cardinals for relief pitcher Bob Duliba, and never again pitched in a major league game.
