= Jack Bolling =

American baseball player (born 1917)

- First baseman
- Born: February 20, 1917; Mobile, Alabama, U.S.
- Died: April 13, 1998 (aged 81); Panama City, Florida, U.S.
- Batted: Left Threw: Left

MLB debut
- June 10, 1939, for the Philadelphia Phillies

Last MLB appearance
- September 20, 1944, for the Brooklyn Dodgers

MLB statistics
- Batting average: .313
- Home runs: 4
- Runs scored: 48
- Stats at Baseball Reference

Teams
- Philadelphia Phillies (1939); Brooklyn Dodgers (1944)

John Edward Bolling (February 20, 1917 – April 13, 1998) was an American first baseman in Major League Baseball during the 1939 and 1944 seasons.

In 125 games over two seasons, Bolling posted a .313 batting average (107-for-342) with 48 runs, 4 home runs, 38 RBIs and 25 bases on balls. He finished his major league career with a .985 fielding percentage.
