= Sam Agnew =

American baseball player (1887–1951)

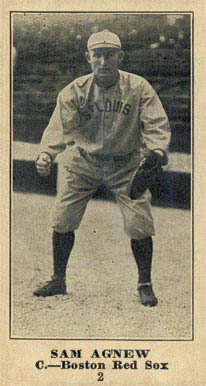
- Agnew in 1916
- Catcher
- Born: April 12, 1887; Farmington, Missouri, U.S.
- Died: July 19, 1951 (aged 64); Sonoma, California, U.S.
- Batted: Right Threw: Right

MLB debut
- April 10, 1913, for the St. Louis Browns

Last MLB appearance
- September 28, 1919, for the Washington Senators

MLB statistics
- Batting average: .204
- Home runs: 2
- Runs batted in: 98
- Stats at Baseball Reference

Teams
- St. Louis Browns (1913–1915); Boston Red Sox (1916–1918); Washington Senators (1919)

Career highlights and awards
- World Series champion (1918)

Samuel Lester "Slam" Agnew (April 12, 1887 – July 19, 1951) was an American professional baseball catcher. He played in Major League Baseball from 1913 through 1919 for the St. Louis Browns, Boston Red Sox and Washington Senators. Agnew batted and threw right-handed.

== Life ==
He was born in Farmington, Missouri on April 12 1887.

Agnew debuted with the St. Louis Browns on April 10, 1913. In 105 games his rookie season, Sam hit .208 with 2 home runs and 24 RBI, stealing 11 bases, in 307 at bats. In 1914, Agnew hit .212 with 16 RBI in 115 games. That season he finished 23rd in the balloting for Most Valuable Player, losing out to Eddie Collins of the Philadelphia Athletics. In 1915, he slipped down to a .203 average with 19 RBI in 104 games.

On December 16, 1915, the Boston Red Sox purchased Agnew from the St. Louis Browns. Serving as the backup to regular backstop Pinch Thomas, Agnew hit .209 (14-for-67) with 7 RBI in 40 games. During a late season Red Sox game, a fight broke out after Carl Mays hit a Washington player with a pitch. The benches emptied and subsequently Agnew punched out Senators manager Clark Griffith. Agnew was arrested and was suspended by the American League President for five days.

Splitting time behind the plate with Thomas in 1917, Agnew hit .208 with 16 RBI in 85 games. Although he was considered the regular catcher in 1918, Agnew struggled at the plate, hitting just .166 with a career-low 6 RBI in 72 games. His offensive woes continued during the 1918 World Series, as he went hitless in nine at bats over four games against the Chicago Cubs.

In January 1919, Agnew was purchased from the Boston Red Sox by the Washington Senators. In just 42 games, Agnew hit a career-high .235 with 10 RBI. He played his final major league game on September 28, 1919. After his playing career, he went on to become a pitching coach for the Cubs and also a minor league coach.

In a seven-season career, Agnew posted a .204 batting average with two home runs and 98 RBI in 563 games played. Agnew died in Sonoma, California, at the age of 64.

After his Major League career ended, he continued to play in the minor leagues with the San Francisco Seals and Hollywood Stars of the Pacific Coast League until 1929.

He was later a manager in the minors for the San Diego Aces of the California State League (1929), Augusta Wolves of the South Atlantic League (1930 & 1938) and Palatka Azaleas of the Florida State League (1937).

He died on July 19, 1951, and is buried in the Chapel of the Chimes in Santa Rosa, California.

== Family ==
His brother was Troy Agnew.
