= Purnal Goldy =

American baseball player (1937–2009)

- Outfielder
- Born: November 28, 1937; Camden, New Jersey, U.S.
- Died: September 21, 2009 (aged 71); Denver, Colorado, U.S.
- Batted: Right Threw: Right

MLB debut
- June 12, 1962, for the Detroit Tigers

Last MLB appearance
- September 28, 1963, for the Detroit Tigers

MLB statistics
- Batting average: .231
- Home runs: 3
- Runs batted in: 12
- Stats at Baseball Reference

Teams
- Detroit Tigers (1962–1963)

Purnal William Goldy (November 28, 1937 – September 21, 2009) was an American professional baseball outfielder. Goldy was a right fielder in Major League Baseball who played for portions of the 1962 and 1963 seasons for the Detroit Tigers. Listed at 6 feet 5 inches (1.96 m) tall and 200 pounds (91 kg), Goldy batted and threw right-handed. The native of Camden, New Jersey, was signed by Detroit out of Temple University.

During his two MLB trials, Goldy was a .231 hitter (18 hits in 78 at bats) with three home runs and 12 RBI in 29 games, including nine runs, one double and one triple.

A veteran of seven Minor league seasons, Goldy hit a combined .299 batting average with 70 home runs and 409 RBI in 790 games for six different teams between 1959 and 1965. In 1960, he led the Class A Sally League in batting (.342) and hits, and was named to the league's all-star team.

Goldy died in Denver, Colorado, at the age of 71.
