= Art Ruble =

American baseball player (1903–1983)

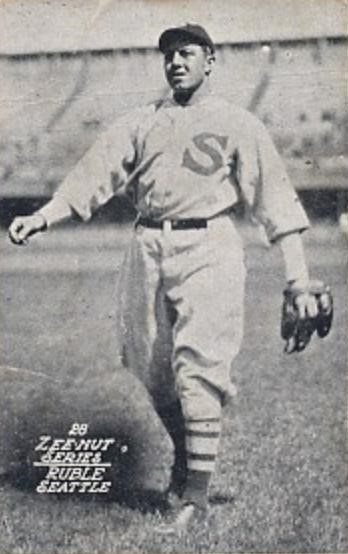
- Outfielder
- Born: March 11, 1903; Knoxville, Tennessee, U.S.
- Died: November 1, 1983 (aged 80); Maryville, Tennessee, U.S.
- Batted: Left Threw: Right

MLB debut
- April 18, 1927, for the Detroit Tigers

Last MLB appearance
- May 13, 1934, for the Philadelphia Phillies

MLB statistics
- Batting average: .207
- Home runs: 0
- Runs batted in: 19
- Stats at Baseball Reference

Teams
- Detroit Tigers (1927); Philadelphia Phillies (1934)

William Arthur Ruble (March 11, 1903 – November 1, 1983) was an American professional baseball player. Nicknamed "Speed", he was an outfielder over parts of two seasons (1927, 1934) with the Detroit Tigers and Philadelphia Phillies. For his career, he compiled a .207 batting average in 145 at-bats, with 19 runs batted in.

An alumnus of Maryville College, he was born in Knoxville, Tennessee and died in Maryville, Tennessee at the age of 80.
