= Billy Rhiel =

American baseball player (1900–1946)

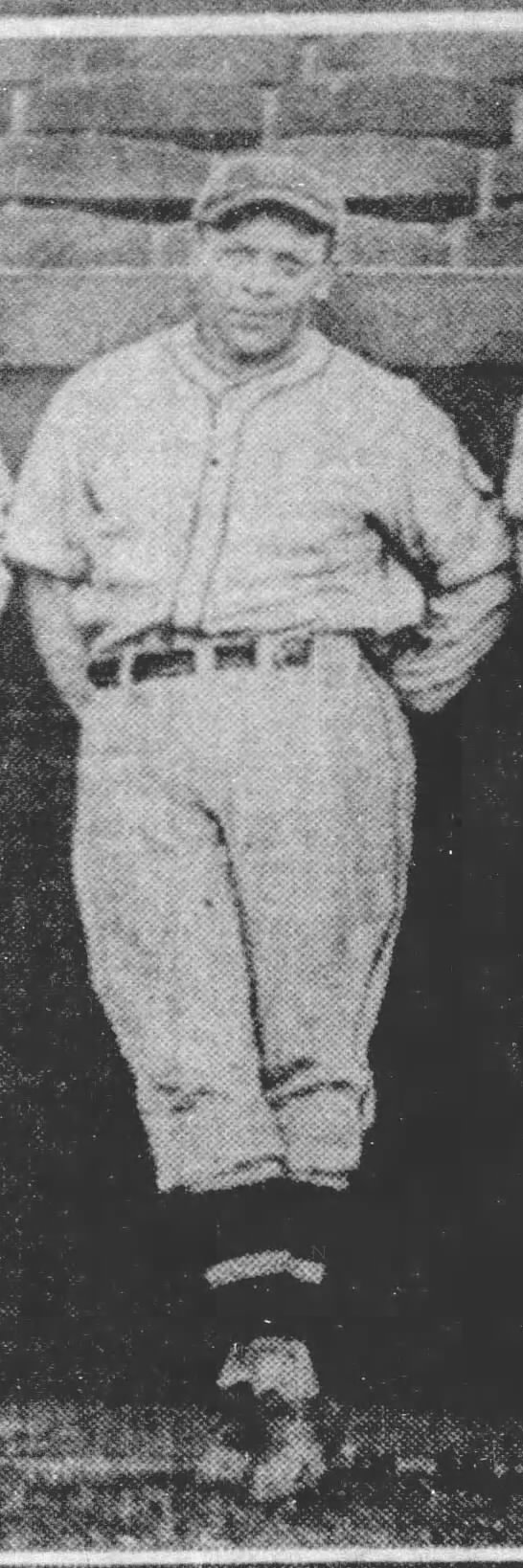
- Second baseman/Third baseman
- Born: August 16, 1900; Youngstown, Ohio
- Died: August 16, 1946 (aged 46); Youngstown, Ohio
- Batted: Right Threw: Right

MLB debut
- April 20, 1929, for the Brooklyn Robins

Last MLB appearance
- July 9, 1933, for the Detroit Tigers

MLB statistics
- Batting average: .266
- Home runs: 7
- Runs batted in: 68
- Stats at Baseball Reference

Teams
- Brooklyn Robins (1929); Boston Braves (1930); Detroit Tigers (1932–1933)

William Joseph Rhiel (August 16, 1900 – August 16, 1946) was a second and third baseman in Major League Baseball who played four seasons with the Brooklyn Robins, Boston Braves, and Detroit Tigers in the late 1920s and early 1930s.

== Early years ==
Rhiel was born in Youngstown, Ohio, to William J. and Mary Lyden Rhiel. He attended local schools including Immaculate Conception Elementary School and Rayen High School. Rhiel gained early recognition as a player for a semi-professional football team associated with St. Edward's Church, in Youngstown. After graduating from Newberry College, in South Carolina, where he was a star football player, Rhiel joined an Atlanta farm team, where he took the position of second baseman.

== Professional career ==
Rhiel made his professional debut with the Brooklyn Robins on April 20, 1929. In July of that year, The New York Times reported that Rhiel smacked a seventh-inning home run in a match with the Pittsburgh Pirates that gave the Robins a 10–7 victory. He moved to the Boston Braves the following year. Rhiel also played with Portland, Oregon, in the Coast League, and Montreal, in the International League. He spent his final two seasons with the Detroit Tigers and played his final major league game on July 9, 1933. He played briefly for the minor league Toledo Mud Hens before ending his professional baseball career.

== Later years ==
After ending his career as a ballplayer, Rhiel returned to his native Ohio, where he settled in the city of Warren. There, he served for 10 years as director of the Junior Baseball League of the American Legion and manager of Warren's Class D baseball team. He also managed the V.F.W. Canteen in Warren, a position he held for 10 years at the time of his death.

Rhiel suffered a fatal heart attack at the home of his sister in 1946. His funeral Mass was held at St. Brendan's Church, in Youngstown.
