= 1905 South Atlantic League season =

- League: South Atlantic League
- Sport: Baseball
- Duration: April 19 – September 16
- Number of games: 130
- Number of teams: 6

Regular season
- League champions: Macon Brigands

SAL seasons
- ← 1904 1906 →

The 1905 South Atlantic League was a Class C baseball season played between April 19 and September 16. Six teams played a 130-game schedule, with the top team winning the pennant.

The Macon Brigands won the South Atlantic League championship, as they finished the regular season in first place.

== Team changes ==
- The Columbia Skyscrapers are renamed the Columbia Gamecocks.
- The Macon Highlanders are renamed the Macon Brigands.

== Teams ==
1905 South Atlantic League
Team	City	MLB Affiliate	Stadium
Augusta Tourists	Augusta, Georgia	None	Warren Park
Charleston Sea Gulls	Charleston, South Carolina	None	Hampton Park Field
Columbia Gamecocks	Columbia, South Carolina	None	Comer Field
Jacksonville Jays	Jacksonville, Florida	None	Dixieland Park
Macon Brigands	Macon, Georgia	None	Central City Park
Savannah Pathfinders	Savannah, Georgia	None	Bolton Street Park

== Map of teams ==
South Atlantic League teams

== Regular season ==
=== Summary ===
- The Macon Brigands finished with the best record in the regular season in the second consecutive season.
- Eighteen year old Ty Cobb of the Augusta Tourists led the league with a .326 batting average. He would join the Detroit Tigers late in the season.

=== Standings ===
South Atlantic League
Team	Win	Loss	%	GB
Macon Brigands	75	45	.625	–
Savannah Pathfinders	71	56	.559	7½
Jacksonville Jays	68	59	.535	10½
Augusta Tourists	57	71	.445	22
Charleston Sea Gulls	53	70	.431	23½
Columbia Gamecocks	52	75	.409	26

== League Leaders ==
=== Batting leaders ===
Stat	Player	Total
AVG	Ty Cobb, Augusta Tourists	.326
H	Paul Sentell, Macon Brigands	137

=== Pitching leaders ===
Stat	Player	Total
W	Bob Spade, Macon Brigands	25

== See also ==
- 1905 Major League Baseball season
