= Augie Bergamo =

American baseball player (1917–1974)

- Outfielder
- Born: February 14, 1917; Detroit, Michigan, U.S.
- Died: August 19, 1974 (aged 57); Grosse Pointe, Michigan, U.S.
- Batted: Left Threw: Left

MLB debut
- April 25, 1944, for the St. Louis Cardinals

Last MLB appearance
- September 30, 1945, for the St. Louis Cardinals

MLB statistics
- Batting average: .304
- Home runs: 5
- Runs batted in: 63
- Stats at Baseball Reference

Teams
- St. Louis Cardinals (1944–1945)

Career highlights and awards
- World Series champion (1944)

August Samuel Bergamo (February 14, 1917 – August 19, 1974) was an American Major League Baseball outfielder who played for the St. Louis Cardinals in 1944 and 1945. A native of Detroit, Michigan, he stood 69 inches (180 cm) tall and weighed 165 pounds (75 kg).

Bergamo is one of many ballplayers who only appeared in the major leagues during World War II. He was a valuable reserve on the 1944 World Series Champions, batting .286 in 80 games. He was the starting left fielder in World Series Game 2 against the St. Louis Browns, won by the Cards 3–2 in 11 innings. Bergamo, the leadoff hitter, was 0-for-5 in the game but hit an RBI grounder in the third that plated the first Cardinal run. For the Series he appeared in three games, going 0-for-6 with one RBI and two walks.

In 1945, he batted .316 in 94 games, but St. Louis finished second that year, three games behind the Chicago Cubs.

Career totals for 174 games played include a .304 batting average (151-for-496), 5 home runs, 63 runs batted in, 86 runs scored, a .400 on-base percentage, and a slugging average of .401. Defensively, he recorded a .977 fielding percentage.

After baseball, Bergamo served as a representative for a manufacturing company in Michigan. Bergamo died at Bon Secours Hospital in Grosse Pointe Farms, Michigan on August 19, 1974.
