= Shreveport Giants =

Minor league baseball team

The Shreveport Giants were a minor league baseball team based in Shreveport, Louisiana. The team played from 1901 to 1903 in the Southern Association. The team became the Shreveport Pirates in 1904.
