= Jim Pruett =

American baseball player (1917-2003)

- Catcher
- Born: December 16, 1917; Nashville, Tennessee, U.S.
- Died: July 29, 2003 (aged 85); Waukesha, Wisconsin, U.S.
- Batted: Right Threw: Right

MLB debut
- September 26, 1944, for the Philadelphia Athletics

Last MLB appearance
- May 30, 1945, for the Philadelphia Athletics

MLB statistics
- Batting average: .231
- Home runs: 0
- Runs batted in: 0
- Stats at Baseball Reference

Teams
- Philadelphia Athletics (1944–1945)

James Calvin Pruett (December 16, 1917 – July 29, 2003) was an American professional baseball player. He was a catcher over parts of two seasons (1944–45) with the Philadelphia Athletics. For his career, he compiled a .231 batting average in 13 at-bats.

He was born in Nashville, Tennessee and died in Waukesha, Wisconsin at the age of 85.
