= Gastonia Pirates =

- 1959–1972; (1959, 1963-1970, 1972); Gastonia, North Carolina

Minor league affiliations
- Previous classes: Class-A
- Previous leagues: Western Carolinas League (1963-1972); South Atlantic League (1959)

Major league affiliations
- Previous teams: Pittsburgh Pirates

Minor league titles
- League titles (1): 1959

Team data
- Previous names: Gastonia Pirates (1959, 1962-1972); Gastonia Rippers (1960)
- Previous parks: Sims Legion Park I

The Gastonia Pirates were a minor league baseball team, based in Gastonia, North Carolina, between 1959 and 1972. The club was a Class-A affiliate of the Pittsburgh Pirates and played primarily in the Western Carolinas League. The club was originally named the Columbus Pirates prior to 1959 and were based in Columbus, Georgia, as a member of the South Atlantic League. On July 6, 1959 the Pirates moved to Gastonia and became the Gastonia Pirates. In 1960 the Pirates were not an affiliate of the Gastonia team and the void was filled by the Gastonia Rippers in the Western Carolinas League.

After the Pirates folded after the 1972 season, the Gastonia Rangers, an affiliate of the Texas Rangers became the city's representative in the Western Carolinas League.

== Season-by-season ==
Year	Record	Finish	Manager	Playoffs
1959*	70-69	4th	Ray Hathaway	League Champs
1960	36-62	8th	Billy Queen / Jack Falls	
1963	73-52	1st	Bob Clear	
1964	60-68	5th	Bob Clear (32-46) / Ray Hathaway (28-22)	
1965	70-54	3rd	Clyde Sukeforth / Don Osborn	
1966	67-57	4th	Bob Clear	No playoffs
1967	61-59	2nd	Don Leppert	No playoffs
1968	68-55	4th	Frank Oceak	
1969	67-58	2nd	Frank Oceak	
1970	55-75	6th	Ed Hobaugh	No playoffs
1972	60-70	4th	Tom Saffell	

* Columbus Pirates moved to Gastonia on July 6, 1959

== Notable alumni ==
- Tony Armas (1972) 2 x MLB All-Star
- Dave Cash (1967) 3 x MLB All-Star
- Bob Moose (1966)
- Omar Moreno (1972) 2 x NL Stolen Base Leader (1978-1979)
- Al Oliver (1965) 7 x MLB All-Star; 1982 AL Batting Title
- Freddie Patek (1966) 3 x MLB All-Star
- Craig Reynolds (1972) 2 x MLB All-Star
- Bob Robertson (1965)
- Rennie Stennett (1969)
- Frank Taveras (1969-1970) 1977 NL Stolen Base Leader
- Milt May (1969)
- Richie Zisk (1968) 2 x MLB All-Star
