= Charleston White Sox =

- 1959–1961; Charleston, South Carolina

Minor league affiliations
- Class: Class A (1959–1961)
- League: South Atlantic League (1959–1961)

Major league affiliations
- Team: Chicago White Sox (1959–1961)

Minor league titles
- League titles (0): None

Team data
- Name: Charleston White Sox (1960–1961); Charleston ChaSox (1959)
- Ballpark: Hampton Park (1959–1961)

The Charleston White Sox were a Minor League Baseball team that played in the Class A South Atlantic League from 1959 to 1961. They were located in Charleston, South Carolina, and played their home games at Hampton Park. Known as the Charleston ChaSox in 1959 and renamed the White Sox in 1960, the team was named in reference to their Major League Baseball affiliate, the Chicago White Sox.
