= Jennings Stadium =

Baseball stadium in Augusta, Georgia

Jennings Stadium was a South Atlantic League baseball stadium in Augusta, Georgia. Built in 1928, it was home to the Augusta Tygers, Augusta Tigers, Augusta Wolves and Augusta Yankees.
