= Wearn Field =

Ballpark in Charlotte, North Carolina, US

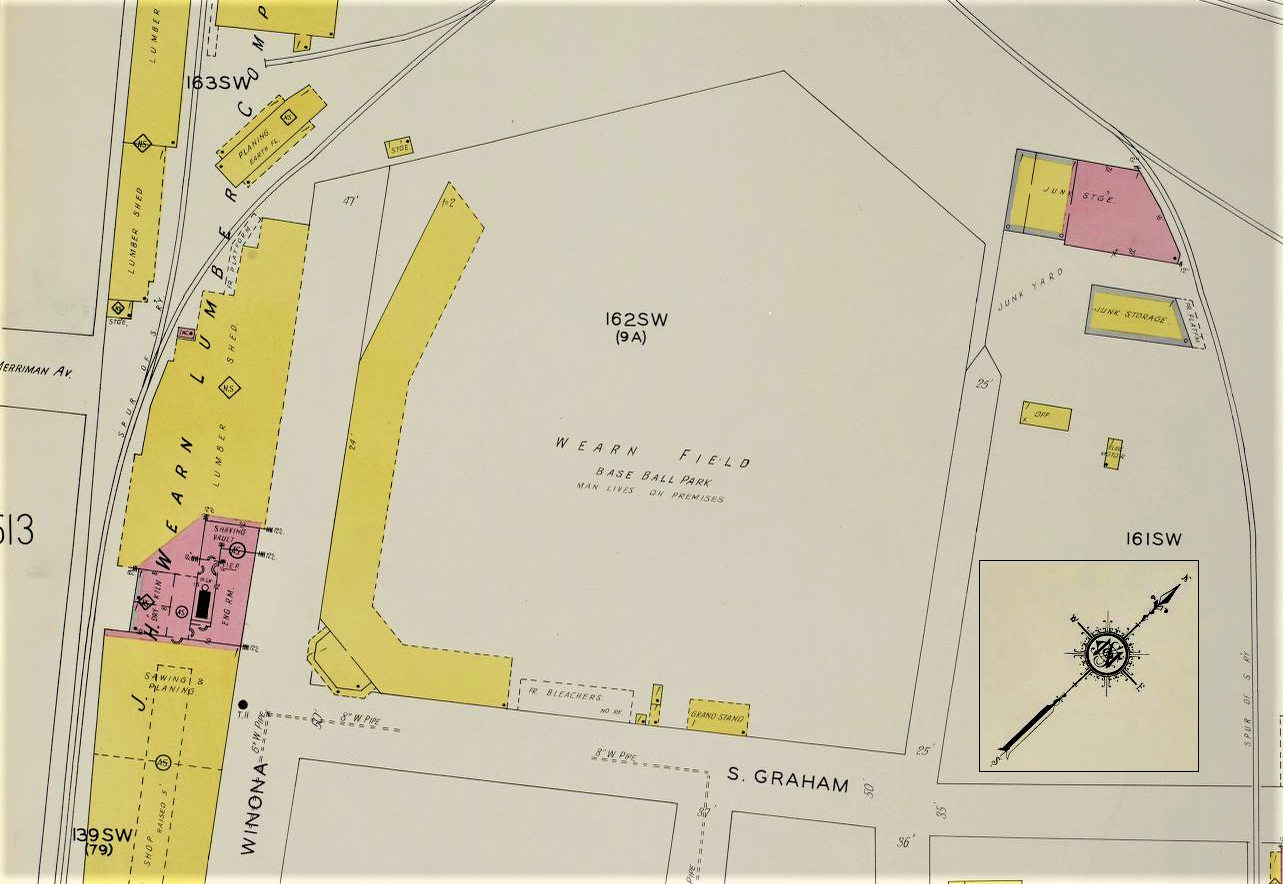
- Wearn Field, 1929 Sanborn Insurance Map
- Former names: Hayman Park
- Location: S Graham St & Winona St, Charlotte, North Carolina 28203
- Owner: J.H. Wearn
- Surface: Grass
- Field size: Left Field – ft Center Field – ft Right Field – ft

Construction
- Opened: 1912
- Closed: 1940

Tenants
- Charlotte Hornets (1912-1940); Buffalo Bisons (IL) (spring training) (1913); Philadelphia Phillies (NL) (spring training) (1919); Syracuse Chiefs (IL) (spring training) (1935, 1937)

Wearn Field was a ballpark located in Charlotte, North Carolina and home to amateur and professional baseball in Charlotte from 1912 to 1940. Wearn Field was built and owned by Hornets club owner J. H. Wearn alongside his lumber mill. Home plate was at the corner of South Graham and Winona Streets; the right field corner was at South Graham and Commerce.

Wearn Field was home to the Charlotte Hornets minor-league baseball team, the Charlotte Red Sox negro league team, and was the spring training home of the Buffalo Bisons in 1913, the Philadelphia Phillies in 1919, and the Syracuse Chiefs in 1935 and 1937.

== History ==
The Charlotte Red Sox negro league club attracted many fans from the area. On Labor Day 1918, the team hosted a fundraiser where they played against Camp Greene’s Black soldiers at Wearn Field and the proceeds donated to support the soldiers.

In April 1926, Babe Ruth led the Yankees to a win over the Brooklyn Dodgers in a preseason exhibition game before 4,000 fans at Wearn Field.

The first integrated baseball game in Charlotte was played at Wearn Field on July 8, 1933 when Highland Park, a white mill team, beat the North Charlotte Black Yankees. Contemporary news accounts differ on the game’s winner.

The Charlotte Hornets were purchased by the Washington Senators in 1937. In 1940, the Senators's Calvin Griffith constructed a new 3,200-seat ballpark in Charlotte's Dilworth neighborhood on Magnolia Avenue, naming it Clark Griffith Park. The Hornets played their last season at Wearn Field in 1940 before moving to Clark Griffth Park in 1941.

In March 2014, the Charlotte Knights unveiled four murals at its Truist Field along the S Graham Street side to commemorate the former Charlotte-area homes of professional baseball including Wearn Field.
