= Charlotte Hornets (baseball) =

Minor-league baseball team in Charlotte, North Carolina

The Charlotte Hornets were an American minor-league baseball franchise based in Charlotte, North Carolina. The club was founded in 1901 and lasted in some form until 1973, capturing 11 league titles during its history. From 1937 to 1942 and 1946 to 1972, the Hornets were a farm system affiliate of the original Washington Senators franchise and its post-1960 successor, the Minnesota Twins. The 1931 and 1951 Hornets have been recognized as being among the 100 greatest minor-league teams of all time.

== Early history (1892, 1901–1936) ==
The earliest "Charlotte Hornets" team was founded in 1892, according to Minor League Baseball records. The team played in the 19th-century South Atlantic League for one season. Their nickname was the "Maroons" because of the maroon colour of the stockings and caps for their uniforms, while the jersey and pants were probably gray, with CHARLOTTE written across the jersey in maroon. Later in 1900, the Charlotte "Presbyterians" played a 27-game season in the North Carolina Association. In 1901, the former "lads in gray and green" Portsmouth Boers relocated from Virginia to Charlotte. Their uniforms were re-used with the "P" being replaced with a "C" on the jersey. Under the name Hornets, a professional baseball team played in 1901 and 1902 in the Virginia–North Carolina League and the North Carolina League, respectively, both Class C leagues (roughly equivalent to Short Season Class A today). In 1905 the Hornets again played in the Virginia–North Carolina League (then a Class D operation, equivalent to a Rookie-level league today).

In 1908, the Hornets were a founding member of the Carolina Association (Class D), where they played through 1913. In 1912, the Hornets moved from the Latta Park Baseball Field to a new ballpark built by J. H. Wearn, called "Wearn Field", also called "Hayman Park" in the 1920s and 1930s and "Robbies Field" in the 1930s. The Hornets moved to the North Carolina State League in 1913, another Class D League, remaining there until 1917, when the team folded because of World War I. In 1919, the Hornets moved to the South Atlantic League (Class C 1919–1920, Class B after 1921), where they remained through the 1930 season. From 1931 to 1935, the "Bees" played in the Piedmont League, which was elevated from Class C to Class B in 1932. In 1935, the Bees were the Piedmont League affiliate of the Boston Red Sox, and in 1936, the Bees briefly left Charlotte and became the "Rocky Mount Red Sox" in Rocky Mount, North Carolina. For just one season in 1936, the Charlotte Hornets were a member of the independent Carolina League with players like "Alabama Pitts" and "Struttin Bud Shaney", who was quite a character.

== Affiliation with the Senators/Twins (1937–1972) ==
The team was purchased by the Washington Senators in 1937. The club would remain affiliated with the Senators/Twins franchise for 35 years. In 1938 the team was managed by Calvin Griffith, the adopted son of Senators owner Clark Griffith. In 1940, Calvin Griffith built a 3,200-seat park on Magnolia Avenue in Charlotte's Dilworth neighborhood and named it Clark Griffith Park. It officially opened in 1941, and was the home of the Hornets for the next 31 years. The ballpark would keep the name Griffith Park for the Charlotte Orioles inaugural season in 1976, before being renamed Jim Crockett Memorial Park (often simply referred to as "Crockett Park") in 1977, after Jim Crockett, husband of O's owner Francis Crockett.

Following a three-year break during World War II, the Hornets returned to competition by joining the Tri-State League (Class B) through the 1953 season, after which they rejoined the Class-A South Atlantic League. They remained in the league upon its being upgraded to Class AA in 1963 and renamed the Southern League the following year, through 1972. (In 1971 the Hornets played in the Dixie Association, a merger of the Texas and Southern leagues.) In 1972, the Twins also placed a Class A Western Carolinas League franchise, the Charlotte Twins, alongside the Double-A Hornets' franchise; it lasted only one season. Through the years, the Hornets won championships in the North Carolina League (1902, 1916 and 1923), Piedmont League (1931 and 1938), Tri-State League (1946, 1947 and 1952), and Southern League (1969 and 1971).

The mainstay of the Hornets through the years was Phillip "Phil" Howser, who became Charlotte General Manager in 1935 and except for three years in the early 1940s when he worked in the Washington Senator's front office, ran the Charlotte operation until January 1970. Sometimes he served both as president and general manager of the club. Howser worked his entire 39-year baseball career for the Griffith family, beginning in 1935 in Chattanooga. From 1971 until his death in 1974 he was southern scouting supervisor for the Twins.

In 1962 Howser was named "King of Baseball", by the National Association of Minor League Baseball and in 1969 he was named minor league baseball's executive of the year. From 1967 to 1969 he was named the Southern League's baseball executive of the year.

In 1972 / maybe or maybe not 1973, there was plans to bring a current affiliate of the Reds? from maybe Tennessee or Kentucky? to Charlotte, called the "Charlotte Pines", but unfortunately, the plans fell through, and thus failing to bring baseball back to Charlotte, for the time being.

== Memorable teams and players ==
The 1931 team won 100 games and lost 37 with a winning percentage of .730. The club was managed by 33-year-old player/manager Oceola Guy Lacy of Cleveland, Tenn., whose playing career spanned a quarter-century, 1916–1941. The Hornets finished 13 1/2 games ahead of the second place Raleigh, which was beaten four games to two in the championship series. The team had several .300 hitters, including Frank "What-A-Man" Packard (.366 with 21 home runs and 123 RBIs); Vern Brandes (.335 with 144 RBIs and a league high 44 stolen bases) and George Rhinehardt (.325). Jimmy Hudgens batted (.290) and was the only one of the group to play in the major leagues. The team's top pitcher was right-hander Charles "Struttin' Bud" Shaney, who led the league with a 24–10 record. Shaney never played in the majors, but won 230 games during his lengthy minor league career. In 1954 at age 54 he played in his annual Tri-State Leaguye game with the Asheville Tourists and was still good enough to pitch five innings of four-hit shutout ball for a victory. In 1942, Donald O'Dell "Red" Barbary, a second-string catcher, pitched and won a 22-inning game.

In 1951 the Hornets also won 100 games, while losing 40 with a .714 winning percentage record. The team took first place in the league on May 15 and remained there for the rest of the season, finishing 15 games ahead of Asheville. However, Charlotte was eliminated in the opening round of the league playoffs, losing three games to one to Spartanburg, which had finished 27 games behind the Hornets in regular league play. The Hornets were managed by 27-year-old Cal Ermer, who also hit. 297 and led the league's second basemen in fielding (.971) in his last season as an active player. Later he served for nearly two years (1967 and 1968) as manager of the Minnesota Twins.

The Hornets' Francisco "Frank" Campos led the league in batting (.368) with only 20 strike outs in 566 plate appearances. Catcher Bob Oldis and outfield Bruce Barmes also were standouts. Bob Oldis played parts of seven seasons in the Major Leagues as a catcher, and later was a longtime MLB coach and scout.

A host of major league stars played for the Charlotte Hornets including Van Lingle Mungo (1929), Early Wynn (1939), Harmon Killebrew (1956), Tony Oliva (1962) and Graig Nettles (1967). Another player, Archibald "Moonlight" Graham, appeared as a right fielder in a single major league game on June 29, 1905, but he never had an at bat, nor a fielding play. His unusual story came to the attention of author W. P. Kinsella and was popularized by his novel Shoeless Joe and the subsequent 1988 film Field of Dreams. Graham's character was played by Burt Lancaster and Frank Whaley as older and younger Graham.

In 2001 as part of the 200th anniversary celebration of Minor League Baseball, Bill Weiss and Marshall Write, two veteran chroniclers of minor league teams, researched and rated the best Minor League teams of the Twentieth Century. The 1951 Charlotte Hornets ranked 36th and the 1931 Hornets 56th.

== History since 1976 ==
The next era of Charlotte baseball began in 1976, however the three years prior, (1973–75) the stadium sat empty and deteriorating. In an effort to save the iconic stadium from being knocked down for warehouse space, and return baseball to Charlotte, Wrestling promoter Jim Crockett, Jr. and the Crockett family, bought the Asheville Orioles, the AA Southern League affiliate of the Baltimore Orioles, and renamed them the "Charlotte" Orioles. The stadium was refurbished in time for the 1976 season. In 1977 the ballpark was renamed Jim Crockett, Sr. Memorial Park (more commonly known as Crockett Park), after the patriarch of the Crockett family. The team, (known as the " O's "), won Southern League titles in 1980 and 1984. Eventual major-league superstars Eddie Murray (the first baseman of the 1974-75 Asheville O's, then 1976 Charlotte O's) and Cal Ripken (1979–80) played for the O's during this period.

On March 17, 1985, Crockett Park (mostly wood-framed) was destroyed by a massive fire after a high school baseball game. An investigation revealed that the cause of the fire was arson. (either a juvenile set flame to the park, or Jim Crockett Sr. had some wrestling debts unpaid.) The Crockett family built a 5,500-seat makeshift stadium immediately afterward, which served as the O's home for the next two seasons. After the 1987 season concluded, George Shinn, owner and founder of the NBA Charlotte Hornets, bought the team from the Crockett family. He renamed the team the Charlotte Knights out of a naming contest. The Knights played in the makeshift stadium on Magnolia for the 1988 season, with future Major League players like Curt Schilling, Gregg Olson, Steve Finley, Pete Harnisch, Jeff Tackett, and a host of other players. This however was just a temporary measure in Shinn's big plan to build a bigger ballpark, and after failed plans to construct it next to the new Hornets arena on Independence Blvd., he decided on building it in Fort Mill, SC. The Knights switched the team's affiliation to the Chicago Cubs in 1989, playing at "Knights Castle" which was demolished after the season ended, as the new ballpark "Knights Stadium" opened in 1990, and would be the home of a Knights franchise for the following 23 years, but Shinn didn't stop there. What do you need in a bigger ballpark? A bigger level team, AAA level that is, so in 1992, the AA Knights franchise was sold to Nashville when the '92 season ended (the Knights became the Nashville Express 1993-94 (Nashville TN), Port City Roosters 1995-96 (Wilmington NC, AA - SL of the Mariners), then Mobile Bay Bears 1997-201? (Alabama) ) In 1993, Charlotte got apor new AAA International League expansion franchise, which was affiliated with the Cleveland Indians from 1993 to 1994, the Florida Marlins from 1995 to 1998 and the Chicago White Sox from 1999–Present. The team played in York County, South Carolina until 2013, when BB&T Ballpark was built in uptown Charlotte.
