= Augusta Tigers =

- 1884–1963; (1884–1886, 1893, 1898, 1904–1911, 1914–1917, 1919–1931, 1936–1942, 1946–1958, 1962–1963); Augusta, Georgia

Minor league affiliations
- Previous classes: Class AA (1963); Class A (1946–1958, 1962); Class B (1936–1942); Class D (1931); Class B (1921–1930); Class C (1904–1911, 1914–1917, 1919–1920); Class B (1886, 1893, 1898)
- League: South Atlantic League (1936–1942, 1946–1958, 1962–1963); Palmetto League (1931); South Atlantic League (1904–1911, 1914–1917, 1919–1930); Southern League (1885–86, 1893, 1898); Georgia State League (1886); Georgia State League (1884)

Major league affiliations
- Previous teams: New York Yankees (1962–1963); Detroit Tigers (1955–1958); Washington Senators (1950); New York Yankees (1946–1949); Detroit Tigers (1941–1942); New York Yankees (1937–1940); Detroit Tigers (1936)

Minor league titles
- League titles (6): 1916; 1924; 1939; 1946; 1955; 1963
- Pennants (2): 1893 (1st Half); 1898

Team data
- Previous names: Augusta Yankees (1962–1963); Augusta Tigers (1955–1958); Augusta Rams (1953–1954); Augusta Tigers (1936–1942, 1946–1952); Augusta Wolves (1930–1931); Augusta Tygers (1922–1929); Augusta Georgians (1920–1921); Augusta Dollies (1919); Augusta Tourists (1903–1917); Augusta (1898); Augusta Electricians (1893); Augusta (1886); Augusta Browns (1884–1886); Augusta Clinchs (1884)
- Previous parks: Jennings Stadium

The Augusta Tigers was the primary moniker of the minor league baseball teams in Augusta, Georgia. Beginning in 1884, Augusta has hosted numerous teams in various leagues. Baseball Hall of Fame charter member Ty Cobb played for the Augusta Tourists in 1904 and 1905.

== History ==
The Augusta Yankees were a South Atlantic League minor league baseball team based in Augusta, Georgia that played from 1962 to 1963. The team was managed by Ernie White in 1962 and Rube Walker in 1963. It played its home games at Jennings Stadium. Notable players include Pete Mikkelsen, Dooley Womack and Roger Repoz.

The Augusta Tigers were a minor league baseball team that existed on-and-off from 1936 to 1958. Based in Augusta, Georgia, they played in the South Atlantic League from 1936 to 1942, from 1946 to 1952 and from 1955 to 1958. They were affiliated with the Detroit Tigers in 1936, from 1941 to 1942 and from 1955 to 1958. From 1937 to 1940 and from 1946 to 1949 they were affiliated with the New York Yankees. In 1950, they were affiliated with the Washington Senators. They played their home games at Jennings Stadium.

The Augusta Wolves were a South Atlantic League (1930) and Palmetto League (1931) minor league baseball team based in Augusta, Georgia. The team played its home games at Jennings Stadium. Multiple notable players spent time with the team, including Debs Garms and Wally Moses.

The Augusta Tygers were a minor league baseball team based in Augusta, Georgia, USA. They played in the South Atlantic League from 1922 to 1929. In 1926, under manager Johnny Nee, they were the league champions.

They were named after Ty Cobb, who began his professional career in Augusta in 1904.

They played their home games at Jennings Stadium.

The Augusta Georgians were a minor league baseball team that played from 1920 to 1921 in the South Atlantic League. Based in Augusta, Georgia, USA, they were managed by Dolly Stark in 1920 and by Emil Huhn in 1921. Under Stark, they went 55–68, and under Huhn they went 78–68.

Notable players include Troy Agnew, Bud Davis, Doc Knowlson, Curt Walker, Doc Bass, Don Songer, and Stark himself.

== Year-by-year records ==
Year	Record	Finish	Manager	Playoffs
1936	56-94	5th	Dixie Parker / Herb Thomas	Did not qualify
1937	62-78	5th	Jack Mealey / Troy Agnew	Did not qualify
1938	74-66	4th	Sam Agnew	Lost in 1st round
1939	83-56	2nd	Ernie Jenkins	League Champs
1940	77-73	5th	Phil Page / Ray White	Did not qualify
1941	64-74	4th	Lefty Jenkins / Alton Biggs	Lost in 1st round
1942	54-84	8th	Alton Biggs / Wally Schang	Did not qualify
1946	76-63	4th	Dibrell Williams	League Champs
1947	81-69	4th	Dibrell Williams / Bill Cooper	Lost League Finals
1948	64-87	7th	Bill Cooper / Mike Garbark / Ernie Jenkins	Did not qualify
1949	69-83	6th	Alton Biggs / Jim Pruett	Did not qualify
1950	66-87	7th	Pete Appleton	Did not qualify
1951	62-76	7th	Ivy Griffin	Did not qualify
1952	38-116	8th	Bob Latshaw / Burl Storie / Walter Snider / Chip Marshall	Did not qualify
1955	76-64	3rd	Charlie Metro	League Champs
1956	74-66	4th	Frank Skaff / Willis Hudlin / Bill Norman	Lost in 1st round
1957	98-56	1st	Bill Adair	Lost League Finals
1958	77-63	1st	Bill Adair (30-21) / Stan Charnofsky / Wayne Blackburn	Lost in 1st round

== Notable alumni ==
- Ty Cobb (1904-1905) Inducted Baseball Hall of Fame, 1936
- Pete Appleton (1950)
- Jim Bagby (1910) 1920 AL Wins Leader
- Eddie Cicotte (1905) Black Sox Scandal
- Clint Courtney (1948)
- Jerry Denny (1983)
- Debs Garms (1930) 1940 NL Batting Title
- Fred Gladding (1958)
- George Harper (1936)
- Don Heffner (1929)
- John Hofford (1885)
- Ralph Houk (1941) Manager: 1960-1961 World Series Champion New York Yankees
- Matt Kilroy (1885) 1887 AA Wins leader.
- Jack Mealey (1937)
- Wally Moses (1931) 2 x MLB All-Star
- Joe Page (1941) 3 x MLB All-Star
- Mel Queen (1940)
- Nap Rucker (1906)
- Gabby Street (1926) Manager: 1931 World Series Champion St. Louis Cardinals
- Bill Swift (1929)
- Bob Swift (1936)
- George Thomas (1958)
- John Tsitouris (1956)
- Curt Walker (1919-1920)
- Rube Walker (1963)
- Hal Woodeshick (1957) 2 x MLB All-Star
