= Western Carolinas League =

Former American league in minor league baseball

- Most recent season or competition: 1979 Western Carolinas League season
- Sport: Baseball
- Founded: 1963
- Folded: 1979
- Replaced by: South Atlantic League
- No. of teams: 14
- Country: USA
- Last champion: Greenwood Braves
- Most titles: 5 Greenwood Braves, Spartanburg Phillies

The Western Carolinas League was a Class D level (1948–52; 1960–62) and a low Class A level (1963–79) full-season league in American minor league baseball. The Western Carolinas League changed its name prior to the 1980 season and has been known since as the South Atlantic League, a Class A level circuit with teams up the Eastern Seaboard from Georgia to New York.

Originally called the "Western Carolina League", the 1948–52 Western Carolinas League was a Class D level league (equivalent to a Rookie-level league today) composed exclusively of teams located in the Piedmont and Blue Ridge sections of western North Carolina. It merged with the North Carolina State League to form the short-lived Class D Tar Heel League, which lasted only 1½ seasons (1953–54) before folding.

In 1960, the WCL was revived as a Class D circuit intended to house farm teams of the member clubs of a planned third major league, the Continental League. It featured teams in eight North Carolina locales: Gastonia, Hickory, Lexington, Newton–Conover, Rutherford County, Salisbury, Shelby and Statesville, but soon expanded to sites in South Carolina.

When the Continental League was torpedoed by the Major League Baseball expansion in 1961 and 1962, the member teams of the Western Carolinas League became affiliates of American and National League clubs. It was upgraded to Class A in the 1963 reorganization of the minor leagues. The first professional baseball team based in Monroe, North Carolina, came into being when the Statesville Indians moved into town on June 20, 1969 and finished the year as the Monroe Indians. The team lasted just one season before moving to Sumter.

For nearly 60 years, 1948 through 2007, the WCL/SAL's dominant figure was founder and president John Henry Moss, who started the Western Carolina League as a young man in 1948, revived it in 1960, and then led the circuit into the new century. Moss, also the longtime mayor of Kings Mountain, North Carolina, retired at the close of the 2007 Sally League season and died, at age 90, on July 1, 2009.

== Member teams ==
=== Western Carolina League (1948–1952) ===
- Forest City Owls
- Gastonia Browns
- Granite Falls Graniteers
- Hendersonville Skylarks
- Hickory Rebels
- Lenoir Red Sox
- Lincolnton Cardinals
- Marion Marauders
- Morganton Aggies
- Newton-Conover Twins
- Rutherford County Owls
- Shelby Farmers

=== Western Carolinas League (1960–1979) ===
- Anderson, South Carolina: Anderson Senators (1970–1971); Anderson Giants (1972); Anderson Tigers (1973); Anderson Mets (1974); Anderson Rangers (1975)
- Asheville, North Carolina: Asheville Tourists (1976–1979)
- Belmont, North Carolina: Belmont Chiefs (1961)
- Charleston, South Carolina: Charleston Pirates (1973–1975); Charleston Patriots (1976–1977); Charleston Pirates (1978)
- Charlotte, North Carolina: Charlotte Twins (1972)
- Gastonia, North Carolina: Gastonia Rippers (1960); Gastonia Pirates (1963-1970, 1972); Gastonia Rangers (1973–1974); Gastonia Cardinals (1977–1979)
- Greensboro, North Carolina: Greensboro Hornets (1979)
- Greenville, South Carolina: Greenville Braves (1963–1964); Greenville Mets (1965–1966); Greenville Red Sox (1967–1971); Greenville Rangers (1972)
- Greenwood, South Carolina: Greenwood Braves (1968–1979)
- Hickory, North Carolina: Hickory Rebels (1960)
- Lexington, North Carolina: Lexington Indians (1960–1961); Lexington Giants (1963–1966); Lexington Braves (1967)
- Monroe, North Carolina: Monroe Indians 1969; Monroe Pirates (1971)
- Newton, North Carolina & Conover, North Carolina: Newton-Conover Twins (1960–1962)
- Orangeburg, South Carolina: Orangeburg Cardinals (1973); Orangeburg Dodgers (1974)
- Rock Hill, South Carolina: Rock Hill Wrens (1963); Rock Hill Cardinals (1964–1966; Rock Hill Indians (1967-1968)
- Salisbury, North Carolina: Salisbury Braves (1960–1962); Salisbury Dodgers 1963-1964; Salisbury Astros (1965-1966); Salisbury Senators 1968
- Shelby, North Carolina: Shelby Colonels (1960–1963); Shelby Yankees (1964); Shelby Rebels (1965); Shelby Senators (1969); Shelby Reds (1977-1978; Shelby Pirates (1979
- Spartanburg, South Carolina: Spartanburg Phillies (1963–1979)
- Spindale, North Carolina: Rutherford County Owls (1960)
- Statesville, North Carolina: Statesville Owls (1960–1963); Statesville Colts (1964); Statesville Tigers (1966–1967); Statesville Indians (1969)
- Sumter, South Carolina: Sumter Indians (1970); Sumter Astros (1971)
- Thomasville, North Carolina: Thomasville Hi-Toms (1965–1966)

== League champions ==
- 1963 Greenville Braves
- 1964 Salisbury Dodgers
- 1965 Rock Hill Cardinals
- 1966 Spartanburg Phillies
- 1967 Spartanburg Phillies
- 1968 Greenwood Braves
- 1969 Greenwood Braves
- 1970 Greenville Red Sox
- 1971 Greenwood Braves
- 1972 Spartanburg Phillies
- 1973 Spartanburg Phillies
- 1974 Gastonia Rangers
- 1975 Spartanburg Phillies
- 1976 Greenwood Braves
- 1977 Gastonia Cardinals
- 1978 Greenwood Braves
- 1979 Greenwood Braves

== South Atlantic Hall of Fame ==
- The South Atlantic League Hall of Fame was founded in 1994 and includes Western Carolinas League alumni.
