= Newton–Conover Twins =

- 1937–1962; (1937–1940, 1948–1952, 1960–1962); Newton, North Carolina

Minor league affiliations
- Class: Class D (1937–1940, 1948–1952, 1960–1962)
- League: North Carolina State League (1937–1938); Tar Heel League (1939–1940); Western Carolina League (1948–1952, 1960–1962)

Major league affiliations
- Team: Cleveland Indians (1937); Milwaukee Braves (1961)

Minor league titles
- League titles (0): None
- Conference titles (2): 1949; 1950
- Wild card berths (3): 1948; 1951; 1960

Team data
- Name: Newton–Conover Twins (1937–1940, 1948–1952, 1960–1962)
- Ballpark: Newton-Conover High School Stadium (1937–1939); American Legion Field (1940, 1948–1952, 1960–1962)

The Newton–Conover Twins were a minor league baseball team based in Newton, North Carolina. The team was operated in partnership with neighboring Conover, North Carolina. Newton–Conover Twins teams played as members of the North Carolina State League in 1937 and 1938, Tar Heel League in 1939 and 1940 and the Western Carolina League from 1948 to 1951 and again from 1961 to 1963.

The Twins first played home minor league games at Newton-Conover High School Stadium through 1939 and before moving to American Legion Field beginning in 1940. Both ballparks were located in Newton, Carolina and are still in use today.

Newton–Conover teams played as a minor league affiliate of the Cleveland Indians in 1937 and Milwaukee Braves in 1961.

== History ==
=== 1937 to 1940: North Carolina State League / Tar Heel League ===
The professional baseball partnership between Newton, North Carolina and Conover, North Carolina began on January 18, 1937, when the Newton–Conover "Twins" franchise was accepted into the North Carolina State League. The "Twins" moniker was in reference to the two cities. Twins games were broadcast locally on WNNC radio, with Earl Holder serving as announcer for seven of the teams' seasons.

Minor league baseball play began for Newton and Conover in the 1937 season, when the Newton–Conover Twins began play as members of the eight–team Class D level North Carolina State League. The North Carolina State League had reformed for the 1937 season, with the Newton–Conover franchise joining the Cooleemee Weavers, Landis Sens, Lexington Indians, Mooresville Moors, Thomasville Chair Makers, Salisbury Bees and Shelby Cardinals in league play.

In their first season of play, the 1937 Newton–Conover Twins were minor league affiliate of the Cleveland Indians. The Twins finished last in the 1937 North Carolina State League standings. Playing under managers Phil Lundeen, Buz Phillips and Ray Lindsey, Newton–Conover had a final record of 36–73 to finish in eighth place. The Twins ended the season 38.0 games behind the first place Mooresville Moors in the final regular season standings. Newton–Conover did not qualify for the playoffs, which were won by Mooresville.

Continuing North Carolina State League play in 1938, the Newton–Conover Twins did not qualify for the playoffs. Finishing with a 46–66 record, the Twins placed sixth in the regular season standings. Led by managers Rube Wilson, Clarence (Gracie) Allen and Mack Arnette, Newton–Conover ended the season 29.5 games behind the first place Thomasville Tommies. The Twins did not qualify for the playoffs, in which Thomasville and Mooresville were declared co–champions. After the 1938 season, the Twins left the North Carolina State League and moved to a new league.

In 1939, Newton–Conover continued hosting minor league play, joining a newly formed Class D level league. The Twins became charter members of the six–team Class D level Tar Heel League. The Gastonia Cardinals, Hickory Rebels, Lenoir Indians, Shelby Nationals and Statesville Owls teams joined Newton–Conover in beginning league play as charter members.

The 1939 Newton–Conover Twins finished last in their first season of Tar Heel League play. Newton–Conover placed sixth with a 36–69 record. Mack Arnette, Chick Suggs and Red Matheson served as managers as the Twins finished 34.5 games behind the first place Gastonia Cardinals in the final regular season standings. The Twins did not qualify for the playoff won by Gastonia. Pitcher Ralph Fox of the Twins, led the Tar Heel League with 17 wins on the season.

In 1940, the Twins folded before the completion of the Tar Heel League season. On July 19, 1940, the Newton–Conover Twins and Shelby Nationals folded from the six–team league. The Twins had compiled a 27–45 record under managers Charles Hager and Ginger Watts at the time the team folded. The Tar Heel League permanently folded following the 1940 season. Twins pitcher Frank Motley led the Tar Heel League with 174 strikeouts.

=== 1948 to 1962: Western Carolina League ===
In 1948, Newton–Conover resumed minor league play in another newly formed league. The "Twins" were reformed and joined as charter members of the eight–team Class D level Western Carolina League. The Forest City Owls, Hendersonville Skylarks, Lenoir Red Sox, Lincolnton Cardinals, Marion Marauders, Morganton Aggies and Shelby Farmers teams joined the Twins as charter franchises in beginning league play on April 30, 1948.

In their first Western Carolina League season, the 1948 Twins placed second and advanced to the league finals. Newton–Conover ended the regular season with a 67–43 record to finish the regular season in second place. Manager Eddie Yount began a four-season stint with the team as the Twins finished 2.0 games behind the Lincolnton Cardinals. In the playoffs, the Twins defeated the Forest City 4 games to 2. Advancing, Newton–Conover lost in the Finals 4 games to 3 to Lincolnton. The Twins' player/manager Eddie Yount led the Western Carolina League with both 43 home runs and 140 RBI as teammate Ray Lindsey led the league with 21 wins and 255 strikeouts.

The 1949 Newton–Conover Twins won the Western Carolina League pennant. The Twins ended the regular season with a record of 72–36 to capture first place in the regular season standings, playing under returning manager Eddie Yount. Newton–Conover finished 4.0 games ahead of second place Lincolnton Cardinals in the regular season standings. The Twins lost in first round of the playoffs to the Rutherford County Owls, 4 games to 2.

The Newton–Conover Twins won their second consecutive Western Carolina League pennant in 1950 and advanced to the finals. Playing under returning manager Eddie Yount, the Twins ended the regular season with a 69–41 record. Finishing in first place, Newton–Conover ended the regular season 0.5 games ahead of the second place Lenoir Red Sox in the final standings. In the playoffs, Newton–Conover defeated the Rutherford County Owls 4 games to 2. The Twins lost in the league Finals to the Lenoir Red Sox, 4 games to 3. Twins pitcher John White led the Western Carolina League with both 21 wins and a 3.05 ERA.

In 1951, the Twins qualified for the Western Carolina League playoffs for the fourth consecutive season under manager Eddie Yount. Newton–Conover ended the regular season with a 63–48 record to finish in fourth place. The Twins finished 8.5 games behind first place Morganton Aggies in the final regular season standings. Newton–Conover lost in the first round of the playoffs to the eventual champion Shelby Farmers, 4 games to 2. Newton–Conover folded after the 1951 season, along with the Lenoir Red Sox, as the Western Carolina League reduced to six teams in 1952. The league folded following the 1952 season, before returning to play in 1960.

After an eight-season absence, the 1960 Newton–Conover Twins returned to minor league play, rejoining the reformed eight–team Class D level Western Carolina League. Returning to play the Twins qualified for the playoffs with a fourth-place finish. Playing the 1960 season under manager John Isaac, the Twins ended the regular season with a 47–52 record, finishing 23.0 games behind the first place Lexington Indians. Newton–Conover lost in first round, 2 games to 1 to the Salisbury Braves. Manager John Isaac also was a pitcher for the Twins, leading the Western Carolina League with 177 strikeouts.

The Newton–Conover Twins became a minor league affiliate of the Milwaukee Braves in 1961. Continuing Western Carolina League play as the league reduced from eight teams to six teams. The Newton–Conover Twins finished last in the regular season standings, playing under manager Joe Abernethy. The Twins finished in sixth place, ending the season 24.0 games behind the first place Salisbury Braves with a final record of 36–58. Newton–Conover did not qualify for the playoffs, which were won by the Shelby Colonels.

In their final season of minor league play, the 1962 Newton–Conover Twins placed third in the four–team Western Carolina League, which again reduced teams. The Twins ended the season with a record of 42–57 record, finishing 22.5 games behind the champion Statesville Owls. The Twins played under player/manager Henry Nichols, who led the league with 66 RBI. No playoffs were held as Statesville won both half–season titles.

The Western Carolina League evolved into the 1963 Western Carolinas League, without the Newton–Conover Twins franchise, which permanently folded following the 1962 season. Newton, North Carolina and Conover, North Carolina have not hosted another minor league team.

== The ballparks ==
For their first three seasons of play, from 1937 to 1939, the Newton–Conover Twins hosted minor league home games at the Newton-Conover High School Stadium. Today, the high school is located at 338 West 15th Street, Newton, North Carolina.

Beginning in 1940, the Newton–Conover Twins minor league teams played home games at the American Legion Field in Newton. Today, the ballpark is still in use and is home to the Catawba Valley Community College baseball team.

== Timeline ==
Year(s)	# Yrs.	Team	Level	League	Affiliate	Ballpark
1937	1	Newton–Conover Twins	Class D	North Carolina State League	Cleveland Indians	Newton-Conover High School Stadium
1938	1	Newton–Conover Twins	Class D	North Carolina State League	None	Newton-Conover High School Stadium
1939	1	Newton–Conover Twins	Class D	North Carolina State League	None	Newton-Conover High School Stadium
1940	2	Newton–Conover Twins	Class D	Tar Heel League	None	American Legion Field
1948–1951	4	Newton–Conover Twins	Class D	Western Carolina League	None	American Legion Field
1960	1	Newton–Conover Twins	Class D	Western Carolina League	None	American Legion Field
1961	1	Newton–Conover Twins	Class D	Western Carolina League	Milwaukee Braves	American Legion Field
1962	1	Newton–Conover Twins	Class D	Western Carolina League	None	American Legion Field

== Year-by-year records ==
Year	Record	Finish	Manager	Playoffs/Notes
1937	36–73	8th	Phil Lundeen / Buz Phillips / Ray Lindsey	Did not qualify
1938	46–66	6th	Rube Wilson / Clarence (Gracie) Allen / Mack Arnette	Did not qualify
1939	36–69	6th	Mack Arnette / Chick Suggs / Red Matheson	Did not qualify
1940	27–45	NA	Charles Hager / Ginger Watts	Team disbanded July 19
1948	67–43	2nd	Eddie Yount	Lost League Finals
1949	72–36	1st	Eddie Yount	Won pennant Lost in 1st round
1950	69–41	1st	Eddie Yount	Won pennant Lost League Finals
1951	63–48	4th	Eddie Yount	Lost in 1st round
1960	47–52	4th	John Isaac	Lost in 1st round
1961	36–58	6th	Joe Abernethy	Did not qualify
1962	42–57	3rd	Henry Nichols	No playoffs held

== Notable alumni ==
- John Burrows (1939)
- Hal Griggs (1951)
- Fred McCall (1964)
- Roger McKee (1949)
- Buz Phillips (1937, MGR), (1938)
- Frank Ragland (1939)
- Steve Shea (1962)
- Tripp Sigman (1938)
- Forrest Thompson (1937)
- Oscar Tuero (1937)
- Ed Walczak (1949–1950)
- George Woodend (1938–1939)
- Eddie Yount (1948–1951, MGR)
- Newton-Conover Twins players
