= Shelby Farmers =

- 1948–1952; (1937-1940, 1946, 1948–1954); Shelby, North Carolina

Minor league affiliations
- Class: Class D (1937-1940, 1946, 1948–1954)
- League: North Carolina State League (1937–1938); Tar Heel League (1939–1940); Tri-State League (1946); Western Carolina League (1948–1952); Tar Heel League (1953-1954)

Major league affiliations
- Team: St. Louis Cardinals (1937–1938); Washington Senators (1939–1940); Chicago Cubs (1946); New York Giants (1954)

Minor league titles
- League titles (2): 1951; 1952
- Wild card berths (6): 1937; 1939; 1946; 1951; 1952; 1953

Team data
- Name: Shelby Cardinals (1937–1938); Shelby Nationals (1939); Shelby Colonels (1940); Shelby Cubs (1946); Shelby Farmers (1948–1952); Shelby Clippers (1953–1954)
- Ballpark: Veterans Stadium (1940, 1946, 1948–1954)

The Shelby Farmers were a minor league baseball team based in Shelby, North Carolina. From 1948 to 1952, the "Farmers" played exclusively as members of the Class D level Western Carolina League, winning the 1951 and 1952 league championships.

Preceding the Farmers, Shelby minor league teams played at members of the Class D level North Carolina State League (1937–1938), Tar Heel League (1939–1940) and the Tri-State League (1946), with Shelby teams serving as a minor league affiliate of the St. Louis Cardinals (1937–1938), Washington Senators (1939–1940) and Chicago Cubs (1946). The Farmers were immediately succeeded by the 1953 and 1954 Shelby "Clippers" of the Tar Heel League, who were a minor league affiliate of the New York Giants (1954). Overall, Shelby teams in the era qualified for six playoff appearances.

Shelby hosted minor league games in the era at Veterans Park in Shelby.

== History ==
=== 1937 & 1938: North Carolina State League ===
Shelby, North Carolina first hosted minor league baseball in 1936, when the Shelby "Cee-Cees" played the season as members of the independent Carolina League. The league played the 1936 season as an eight-team league.

In 1937, the Shelby "Cardinals" became charter members of the reformed the eight–team Class D level North Carolina State League. The Cooleemee Weavers, Landis Sens, Lexington Indians, Mooresville Moors, Newton-Conover Twins (Cleveland Indians affiliate), Salisbury Bees (Boston Bees affiliate) and Thomasville Chair Makers teams joined with Shelby in beginning league play on April 30, 1937.

In their first season of play, the 1937 Shelby Cardinals played as a minor league affiliate of the St. Louis Cardinals. In their first season of play the Cardinals advanced to the North Carolina State League finals. Shelby ended the 1937 regular season with a record of 55–52 to place fourth in the North Carolina State League regular season standings, qualifying for the playoffs under manager George Silvey. The Cardinals finished 18.0 games behind the first place Mooresville Moors. In the four-team playoffs, Shelby defeated the Thomasville Chair Makers 3 games to 2 in the first round to advance. In the finals, Mooresville defeated the Shelby Cardinals 4 games to 3 to capture the 1937 North Carolina State League Championship. Floyd Beal of Shelby led the North Carolina State League with both 21 home runs and 107 RBI. Teammate Jack Angie scored 109 runs, most in the league.

Frank Crespi played for the Selby Cardinals in 1937 in his first professional season at age 19, hitting .314 with 11 home runs. Crespi became the St. Louis Cardinals starting second basemen and was a key contributor on the 1942 World Series champion Cardinals before being drafted into military service. drafted into the United States Army in early 1943, Crespi qualified for a deferment as he was the sole supporter of his elderly mother. He refused the military deferment, saying, "I don't think I'm too good to fight for the things I've always enjoyed."

While playing in an Army baseball game in Kansas during his service, Crespi suffered a compound fracture of his left leg. Soon afterwards, he broke the same leg during a training accident, and then broke the same leg a third time during an impromptu wheelchair race while in the military hospital. The, while Crespi was recuperating at the hospital, a nurse accidentally applied 100 times the appropriate quantity of boric acid to his bandages, causing severe burns on Crespi's leg, with the burns leaving him with a permanent limp. it was reported that a total of 23 operations were performed on Crespi's leg and he was unable to return to his playing career following his honorable military discharge.

The Shelby Cardinals continued North Carolina State League play in 1938, before the franchise relocated during the season. On July 22, 1938, the Shelby Cardinals franchise of the eight-team, Class D level North Carolina State League relocated to Gastonia, North Carolina and became the Gastonia Cardinals. Shelby had a record of 19-22 at the time of the move and remained as a minor league affiliate of the St. Louis Cardinals. The Shelby/Gastonia team ended the regular season in second place with a record of 66–45, playing the season under manager George Silvey in both locations. Gastonia finished 9.0 games behind the Thomasville Tommies in the final regular season standings and qualified for the playoffs, where they were swept by the eventual champion Mooresville Moors in three games. Gastonia/Shelby Cardinal player Gene Nafie led the North Carolina State League both with 27 home runs and 120 runs scored, while the Cardinals' player/manager George Silvey topped the league with 80 stolen bases.

=== 1939 & 1940: Tar Heel League ===
In 1939, the Shelby "Nationals" resumed minor league play after the Shelby franchise had relocated during the previous season. The Nationals resumed play as a minor league affiliate of the Washington Senators, while joining a newly formed league. The 1939 Shelby Nationals became charter members of the six-team, Class D level Tar Heel League, which contained three former members of the North Carolina State League. The Gastonia Cardinals, Hickory Rebels, Lenoir Indians, Newton-Conover Twins and Statesville Owls teams joined with Shelby in beginning league play on April 28, 1939.

Ed Montague became the Shelby player/manager in 1939 at age 33. Montague had a four-year major league career and later became a scout. He is best known for scouting Baseball Hall of Fame member Willie Mays for the New York Giants while Mays played in the Negro Leagues. His son, Ed Montague, Jr. served as a major league umpire for 35 years (1974 to 2009), working 4,369 games.

In their first season of league play, the Shelby Nationals qualified for the Tar Heel League playoffs. The Nationals ended the Tar Heel League regular season with a record of 50–59, placing fourth in the final regular season standings. Shelby finished 22.5 games behind the first place Gastonia Cardinals as Ed Montague served as the Shelby manager. In the first round of the four-team Tar Heel League playoffs, Gastonia defeated the Shelby Nationals three games to none en-route to winning the Tar Heel League championship. James Guinn of Shelby had 161 total hits to lead the Tar Heel league in that category.

The team was renamed as the Shelby "Colonels" and continued play as the 1940 Tar Heel League remained with the original six teams, before the Washington Senators affiliated Shelby team folded during the season. On July 18, both the Shelby Colonels and the Newton-Conover Twins teams folded, leaving the Tar Heel League to complete the season with four teams. The Colonels ended their season with a 16–54 record, playing under managers Lou Haneles and Art Patchin as the team disbanded July 19. The Statesville Owls were the eventual league champion. In 1941, the Tar Heel League did not return to play with the onset of World War II.

=== 1946: Post War - Tri State League ===
In 1946, Shelby returned to minor league play following World War II as members of the six-team Class B level Tri-State League. The Shelby "Cubs" played the season as a minor league affiliate of the Chicago Cubs. The Anderson A's New York Giants affiliate, Asheville Tourists (Brooklyn Dodgers), Charlotte Hornets (Washington Senators), Knoxville Smokies and Spartanburg Spartans (St. Louis Browns) teams joined Shelby in beginning league play on April 24, 1946.

Shelby qualified for the four-team playoffs in the six-team Tri-State League. The Cubs ended the 1946 season with a final regular season record of 59–81 to finish in fourth place, playing the season under manager Clyde McDowell and ending the regular season 34.5 games behind first place Charlotte. In the playoffs, Shelby lost in the first round as the eventual champion Charlotte Hornets defeated the Cubs 4 games to 2.

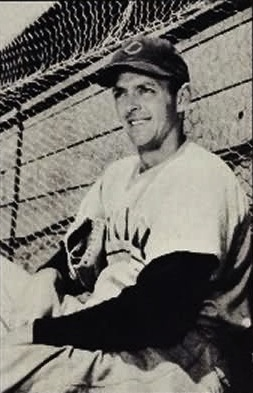
(1953) Roy Smalley Jr.. Chicago Cubs. Smalley played for the Shelby Cubs in 1946.

In his first professional season at age 21, Edward Musial, younger brother of Baseball Hall of Fame member Stan Musial played for the Shelby Cubs. Ed Musial hit .333 for the season in 115 games.

Roy Smalley Jr. played for the Shelby Cubs in 1946, hitting .219 in 30 games at age 20. Smalley would eventually become the Chicago Cubs' regular shortstop from 1948 through 1953. Smalley was replaced as the Cubs shortstop by Baseball Hall of Fame member Ernie Banks in 1954 when he was traded by the Cubs to the Milwaukee Braves.

In 1947, the Tri-State League continued play expanding to become an eight-team league, but without the Shelby franchise.

=== 1948 to 1952: Shelby Farmers - Western Carolina League ===
Shelby, North Carolina next hosted league baseball play in 1948, when the Shelby "Farmers" became charter members of the newly formed eight–team Class D level Western Carolina League. The Forest City Owls, Hendersonville Skylarks, Lenoir Red Sox, Lincolnton Cardinals, Marion Marauders, Morganton Aggies and Newton-Conover Twins teams joined Shelby as charter members beginning league play on April 30, 1948.

In their first season of play in the new league, the Shelby Farmers placed fifth in Western Carolina League regular season standings. Ending the regular season with a record of 54–55, the Farmers ended the season in a tie for fourth place with the Forest City Owls, who had a 55–56 record and both teams had .495 winning percentages. However, Shelby refused to play a playoff game to break the fourth-place tie and the final playoff spot was awarded to Forest City. Playing the season under manager Rube Wilson, Shelby finished 14.5 games behind the first place Lincolnton Cardinals in the Western Carolina League regular season standings. Shelby did not participate in the playoffs won by the Lincolnton Cardinals, who defeated Newton-Conover in the final.

Shelby native Roger McKee played for the 1948 Shelby Farmers, returning to play in his hometown. His father was a fan of the St. Louis Cardinals and named his son Rogers Hornsby McKee after his favorite Cardinals player. At Age 16, McKee had made his major league debut with the Philadelphia Phillies as a pitcher in 1942. On October 3, 1943, the last day of the season, McKee started the second game of a doubleheader against the Pittsburgh Pirates at Forbes Field and pitched a complete game, winning 11–3. At 17, McKee became the youngest pitcher in the 20th century to throw a nine-inning complete-game victory. McKee later gave up pitching and switched to outfield, spending nine seasons in the minor Leagues through 1957, with a batting average of .287 and 115 home runs in 1,173 minor league games. McKee had been a star player as a youth in American Legion baseball in Shelby, playing with Smokey Burgess. McKee later helped coach American Legion youth teams and the Shelby High School teams in Shelby after his playing career ended. McKee died in his hometown of Shelby in 2014.

The Shelby Farmers placed seventh in the 1949 Western Carolina League regular season standings. The Farmers ended the regular season with a record of 40–68, playing the season under managers Joe Borich, Harold Dedmon and Walt Dixon. Shelby ended the regular season 32.0 games behind the first place Newton-Conover Twins and did not qualify for the four-team post season playoffs. The Rutherford County Owls defeated the Morganton Aggies in the finals to win the championship.

In 1950, the Shelby Farmers again placed seventh in the eight-team Western Carolina League final regular season standings. Managed by the returning Walt Dixon, Shelby ended the regular season with a record of 47–63 to finish 22.0 games behind the first place Newton-Conover Twins in the final regular standings. With their seventh place finish in the eight–team league, Shelby again missed the playoffs, won by the Lenoir Red Sox over Newton-Conover in the finals. Shelby pitcher Carl Brown led the Western Carolina League with 236 strikeouts.

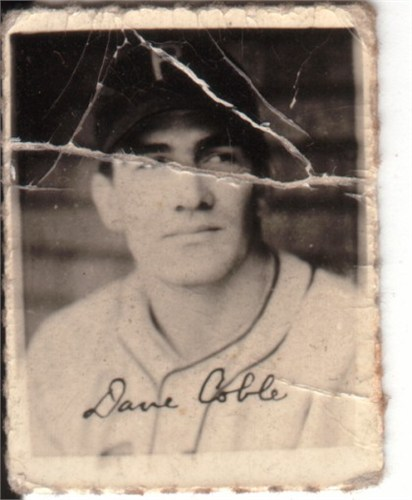
Dave Coble, Philadelphia Phillies. Coble managed the Shelby Farmers for three seasons, leading the team to league championships in 1951 and 1952.

Prior to the 1951 season Dave Coble was hired as the Shelby manager replacing Walt Dixon. Coble would spend three seasons managing the Farmers, winning two league championships. Coble was a former major league player, who had his baseball playing career interrupted by his service in the United States Army. In 1942, Coble had worked during the off season at the Army aviation training base under construction at Metcalfe, Mississippi. In April 1942, he entered service with the Army Air Force and was stationed at Keesler Air Force Base in Mississippi, before transferring to the San Antonio Aviation Cadet Center in Texas. In April 1943, Staff Sergeant Coble was assigned to the Officer Candidate School in Miami Beach, Florida. He returned to San Antonio in July 1943 as a lieutenant and physical training instructor, and continued to play baseball at the Cadet Center, eventually becoming the manager of military baseball teams at Randolph Air Force Base in June 1945. Coble was honorably discharged from his military service at the end of 1945 at age 33. Coble resumed his baseball career in the minor leagues as a manager of the 1946 Gadsden Pilots. Coble had managed the Tifton Blue Sox of the Georgia State League in 1950, prior to being hired by Shelby.

After two consecutive seventh place finishes, the 1951 Shelby Farmers won the Class D level Western Carolina League championship under Dave Coble. Shelby finished with a regular season record of 67–44 to place second in the regular season standings, playing under manager Coble. The Farmers ended the regular season 4.5 games behind the first place Morganton Aggies. In the Western Carolina League playoffs, Shelby defeated the Newton-Conover Twins 4 games to 2 to advance. In the Finals, the Shelby Farmers defeated Morganton Aggies 4 games to 3 in the seven-game series and claimed the championship in the eight-team league. Shelby had notable player performances that contributed to their championship season. Shelby's Henry Miller hit .387 to win the Western Carolina League batting title. Teammate Charles Ballard led the league with both 137 runs scored and 179 total hits. Edward Bass of Shelby had 157 RBI to lead the league.

In their final season of Western Carolina League play, the Shelby Farmers won the 1952 Western Carolina League championship, as the league reduced franchises and become a six-team league. After the league began the season with six teams, on August 3, 1951, the Morganton Aggies franchise folded, leaving five remaining teams. The Farmers had a final regular season record of 71–39 and ended the season in second place, while playing under returning manager Dave Coble. Shelby ended the regular season just 0.5 games ahead of the second place Lincolnton Cardinals (72–39) as the Western Carolina League completed the 1952 season with five teams in the final standings. In the four-team playoffs, Shelby swept the Rutherford County Owls in four games to advance to the final. In the final, the Farmers defeated Lincolnton in a seven-game series to win the Western Carolina League championship. Charles Ballard of Shelby hit. 352 to win the Western Carolina League batting championship. Farmer pitcher Joe Sheppard led the league with both 24 wins and a 2.31 ERA.

In 1953, the Western Carolina League did not return to play.

=== 1953 to 1954 Tar Heel League ===
After the 1952 season, the Western Carolina League combined with the North Carolina State League to form the ten–team Class D level Tar Heel League, which played in the 1953 and 1954 seasons before folding. The renamed Shelby "Clippers" partnered with the Forest City Owls, Hickory Rebels (Chicago Cubs affiliate), High Point-Thomasville Hi-Toms, Lexington Indians, Lincolnton Cardinals, Marion Marauders, Mooresville Moors, Salisbury Rocots (Boston Red Sox affiliate) and Statesville Blues teams in beginning Tar Heel League play on April 24, 1953.

The Shelby franchise continued play in the 1953, and the Clippers finished the 1953 season in third place in the ten–team Tar Heel League. Shelby ended the season with a record of 60–49, playing under returning manager Dave Coble. The Clippers finished 14.0 games behind the first place Marion Marauders in the final regular season standings. In the first round of the league playoffs, the Marion Marauders defeated Shelby 4 games to 2. Pitcher Jose Nakamura of Shelby led the Tar Heel with a 2.40 ERA.

George Brunet made his professional debut pitching briefly for the 1953 Shelby Clippers at age 18. Brunet was signed by Detroit Tigers' scout Cy Williams and received a $500 sighing bonus. "They gave me $500," Brunet said. "I bought a dining room set, a coat for my mother, and a night on the town." In an extensive career, Brunet would pitch for professional teams in the major leagues, minor leagues and Mexican leagues until 1989, when he was 54 years old, even continuing to pitch after suffering a heart attack at age 45.

After playing the previous season with ten teams, the 1954 Tar Heel League began the season reduced to four teams; Shelby included. The Forest City Owls, Hickory Rebels, Marion Marauders and Shelby Clippers teams continued Tar Heel League play. Shelby became a minor league affiliate of the New York Giants. The Tar Heel League folded on June 21, 1954. The Shelby Clippers were in last place with a 16–32 record when the Tar Heel League folded. The Clippers were managed by Harold Kollar, finishing 16.0 games behind the first place Hickory Rebels in the final standings of the partial season.

Following the 1954 season, the Tar Heel League folded and did not return to play in 1955. Shelby next hosted minor league baseball in 1960 when the Shelby "Colonels" resumed minor league play as members of the Class D level Western Carolina League.

== The ballpark ==
The Shelby Farmers and Shelby minor league teams hosted their home minor league games at Veterans Stadium. Today, the ballpark is still in use, now known as "Veterans Field at Keeter Stadium," hosting high school and youth teams.

Since 2011, Keeter Stadium annually has hosted the youth American Legion World Series. Collegiate baseball has also been played at the ballpark. Keeter Stadium is located at 230 East Dixon Boulevard in Shelby, North Carolina.

== Timeline ==
Year(s)	# Yrs.	Team	Level	League	Affiliate	Ballpark
1937–1938	2	Shelby Cardinals	Class D	North Carolina State League	St. Louis Cardinals	Veterans Stadium
1939	1	Shelby Nationals	Class D	Tar Heel League	Washington Senators	Veterans Stadium
1940	1	Shelby Colonels	Class D	Tar Heel League	None	Veterans Stadium
1946	1	Shelby Cubs	Class D	Tri-State League	Chicago Cubs	Veterans Stadium
1948–1952	5	Shelby Farmers	Class D	Western Carolina League	None	Veterans Stadium
1953	1	Shelby Clippers	Class D	Tar Heel League	None	Veterans Stadium
1954	1	Shelby Clippers	Class D	Tar Heel League	New York Giants	Veterans Stadium

== Year-by-year records ==
Year	Record	Finish	Manager	Playoffs/Notes
1937	55–52	4th	George Silvey	Lost League Finals
1938	66–45	2nd	George Silvey	Shelby (19–22) moved to Gastonia July 22; Lost in 1st round
1939	50–59	4th	Ed Montague	Lost in 1st round
1940	16–54	NA	Lou Haneles / Art Patchin	Team disbanded July 19
1946	59–81	4th (t)	Clyde McDowell	Lost in 1st round
1948	54–55	5th	Rube Wilson	Did not qualify
1949	40–68	7th	Joe Borich / Harold Dedmon; Walt Dixon	Did not qualify
1950	47–63	7th	Walt Dixon	Did not qualify
1951	67–44	2nd	Dave Coble	Won league championship
1952	71–39	2nd	Dave Coble	Won league championship
1953	60–49	3rd	Dave Coble	Lost in 1st round
1954	16–32	4th	Harold Kollar	League disbanded June 21

== Notable alumni ==
- Bill Ayers (1937–1938)
- Hal Bamberger (1946)
- Joe Bokina (1939)
- George Brunet (1953)
- Dave Coble (1951–1953, MGR)
- Frank Crespi (1937)
- Walt Dixon (1949–1950, MGR)
- Danny Gardella (1940)
- Glenn Gardner (1937–1938)
- Lou Haneles (1940, MGR)
- Jim Hopper (1939)
- Hal Jeffcoat (1946)
- Roger McKee (1948)
- Rogelio Martinez (1953)
- Carmen Mauro (1946)
- Bill Moisan (1946)
- Ed Montague (1939, MGR)
- Ramón Monzant (1952)
- Ron Necciai (1950)
- Rube Novotney (1946)
- Dave Odom (1939)
- Len Okrie (1946)
- Charlie Osgood (1946)
- Jim Pearce (1946)
- Danny Reynolds (1951–1953)
- Freddy Schmidt (1937)
- Walter Sessi (1937)
- Joe Shipley (1954)
- Roy Smalley Jr. (1946)
- Shelby Farmers players
- Shelby Cardinals players
- Shelby Nationals players
- Shelby Clippers players
- Shelby Cubs players
- Shelby Colonels players
