= Rutherford County Owls =

- 1936–1960; (1936, 1948–1954, 1960); Rutherford County, North Carolina

Minor league affiliations
- Class: Independent (1936); Class D (1948–1954, 1960)
- League: Carolina League (1936); Western Carolina League (1948–1952); Tar Heel League (1953–1954); Western Carolina League (1960)

Major league affiliations
- Team: Chicago Cubs (1949–1951)

Minor league titles
- League titles (1): 1949
- Wild card berths (6): 1948; 1949; 1950; 1952; 1953; 1954

Team data
- Name: Rutherford County Owls (1936); Forest City Owls (1948); Rutherford County Owls (1949–1952); Forest City Owls (1953); Rutherford County Owls (1954, 1960)
- Ballpark: Alexander Park (1936); Spindale High School Stadium (1949–1952); Central High School Park (1948, 1953–1954, 1960)

The Rutherford County Owls were a minor league baseball team based in the Rutherford County, North Carolina cities of Spindale, North Carolina and Forest City, North Carolina. Between 1936 and 1960, the Rutherford County based teams played as members of the 1936 Carolina League, the Western Carolina League from 1948 to 1952, Tar Heel League from 1953 to 1954 and Western Carolina League in 1960, winning the 1949 league championship and qualifying for the playoffs six other times. The franchise played as the Forest City Owls in the 1948 and 1953 seasons.

The Rutherford County Owls were a minor league affiliate of the Chicago Cubs from 1949 to 1951.

== History ==
=== 1936 Carolina League / Umpire attack ===
Rutherford County, North Carolina first hosted league baseball play in 1936. Based in Forest City, North Carolina, the "Rutherford County Owls" began 1936 the season as charter members of the eight–team Independent level Carolina League. The Independent league was nicknamed an "outlaw" league because of the Independent status. Most of the other league members, had previously hosted numerous semi–pro teams in the Carolina Textile League, made up of locals and mill workers. On July 3, 1936, the franchise was reportedly surrendered to the league after an attack of an umpire occurred at the ballpark in Forest City. The Owls had a record of 21–25 under managers Maurice Frew and Baxter Moose when the franchise was surrendered. The franchise became the Lexington Indians and immediately replaced Rutherford County in league play. After compiling a 16–36 record in Lexington, the team then finished the season in sixth place with a 37–61 overall record.

According to reports of the July 3, 1936, incident, umpire C.T. Skidmore was attacked outside of Alexander Park in Forest City after a game against Shelby. After the attack, Skidmore was complimentary of the players and team officials, who assisted him after the attack, including Dr. C.H. Verner who was president of the club and treated Skidmore's injuries. Skidmore stated he believed the attack was by out-of-town fans or gamblers. After the incident, Verner surrendered the team to the league. After a league meeting on July 5, 1936, the franchise was awarded to Lexington.

=== 1948 to 1952 Western Carolina League ===
The 1948 "Forest City Owls" became charter members of the eight–team Class D level Western Carolina League. The Hendersonville Skylarks, Lenoir Red Sox, Lincolnton Cardinals, Marion Marauders, Morganton Aggies, Newton-Conover Twins and Shelby Farmers teams joined Forest City as charter members, beginning play on April 30, 1948.

In their first season of Western Carolina League play, the 1948 the Forest City Owls placed fourth in the league regular season standings and qualified for the four-team playoffs. Ending the regular season with a record of 55–56, while playing the season under managers Jess Hill and Gene Hollifield, Forest City finished 14.5 games behind the first place Lincolnton Cardinals in the Western Carolina League regular season standings. At the end of the regular season, the Shelby Farmers franchise reportedly refused to play a playoff game to break a fourth-place tie and the playoff spot was awarded to Forest City. In the first round of the 1948 playoffs, the Newton-Conover Twins defeated the Forest City Owls 4 games to 2.

The franchise became known as the "Rutherford County Owls" in 1949 and the Owls won the Western Carolina League championship of the eight–team league. The Owls ended the regular season with a record of 65–45 and placed third, playing the season under managers Sam Gibson and Rube Wilson. The Owls played as a minor league affiliate of the Chicago Cubs and finished 8.5 games behind the first place Newton-Conover Twins in the regular season standings. In the playoffs, the Owls defeated the Newton-Conover Twins 4 games to 2 to advance. In the Western Carolina League Finals, the Rutherford County Owls defeated the Morganton Aggies 4 games to 1 to win the Western Carolina League championship.

In 1950, Rutherford County placed third in the Western Carolina League final regular season standings, continuing as a Chicago Cubs affiliate. Managed by Rube Wilson, the Owls ended the season with a record of 57–53 to finish 12.0 games behind the first place Newton-Conover Twins in the final regular standings. In the playoffs, the Newton-Conover Twins defeated Rutherford County 4 games to 2.

The 1951 Rutherford County Owls placed fifth and did not qualify for the playoffs in the eight–team Western Carolina League. Rutherford County finished with a regular season record of 62–48 to place fifth in the regular season standings, playing under returning manager Rube Wilson. The Owls finished 9.0 games behind the first place Morganton Aggies in the final regular season standings. Rutherford County played their final season as a Chicago Cubs minor league affiliate. George Long of Rutherford County led the league with an ERA of 2.12.

The 1952 Western Carolina League began the season reduced to six teams and the Owls continued play. The Rutherford County Owls ended the season in fourth place with a regular season record of 42–58, playing the season under managers Cliff Bolton and William Greene and finishing 22.5 games behind the first place Lincolnton Cardinals. In the playoffs, the Owls were swept by the Shelby Farmers in four games. Rutherford County's Ken Paschal led the Western Carolina League with 19 home runs. The Western Carolina League completed the 1952 season with five teams, after the Morganton Aggies folded during the season. The Western Carolina League combined with the North Carolina State League to form the Tar Heel League in 1953 and 1954 before resuming play in 1960.

=== 1953 to 1954 Tar Heel League ===
The Owls franchise continued play in the 1953 ten–team Class D level Tar Heel League, returning to the "Forest City Owls" nickname for the final time. The Owls finished the 1953 season in second place, ending the season with a record of 70–40, playing under managers Len Cross and Boger McGimsey. Forest City finished 3.0 games behind the first place Marion Marauders in the final regular season standings. In the first round of the league playoffs, the Lexington Indians defeated Forest City 4 games to 2.

The 1954 Tar Heel League began the season reduced to four teams, Rutherford County Included. The league folded on June 21, 1954. The Rutherford County Owls were in second place with a 24–24 record when the league folded. Forest City was managed by Woody Rich and Richard McKeithan, finishing 8.0 games behind the first place Hickory Rebels in the final standings.

=== 1960 Western Carolina League ===
The 1960 "Rutherford County Owls" played a final minor league season a member of the reformed eight–team Class D level Western Carolina League. The Owls finished their final season with a record of 43–56 to place sixth, playing under managers Jim Poole, Ray Walsh and Len Jackson. The franchise folded after the 1960 season, as the league was reduced to six teams for the 1961 season.

Rutherford County, North Carolina has not hosted another minor league team.

Today, the amateur Forest City Owls, who revived the moniker in 2013, play summer collegiate baseball as members of the Coastal Plain League.

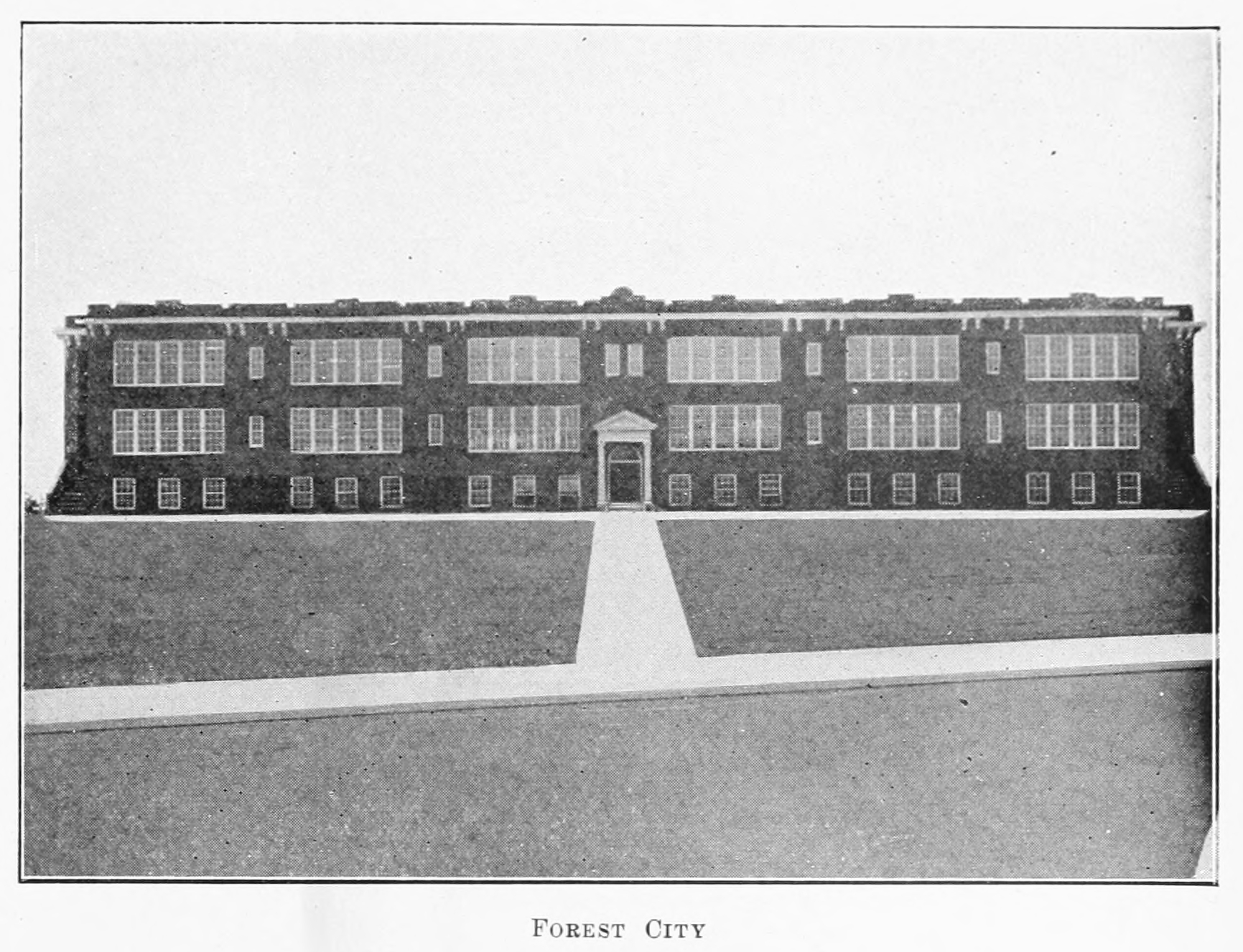
(1922) Forest City School. Forest City, North Carolina

== The ballparks ==
It was reported that the 1936 Rutherford City Owls played minor league home games at Alexander Park in Forest City.

The Rutherford County Owls were noted to have played home minor league games at the Spindale High School Stadium from 1949 to 1952. The ballpark was located at the former Spindale High School in Spindale, North Carolina.

The 1948 and 1953 Forest City Owls and the 1954 and 1960 Rutherford County Owls teams reportedly played home games at Central High School Park, also called "Memorial Park." The ballpark was located at Central High School in Forest City, North Carolina.

== Timeline ==
Year(s)	# Yrs.	Team	Level	League	Affiliate	Ballpark
1936	1	Rutherford City Owls	Independent	Carolina League	None	Alexander Park
1948	1	Forest City Owls	Class D	Western Carolina League	None	Central High School Park
1949–1951	3	Rutherford County Owls	Class D	Western Carolina League	Chicago Cubs	Spindale High School Stadium
1952	1	Rutherford County Owls	Class D	Western Carolina League	None	Spindale High School Stadium
1953	1	Forest City Owls	Class D	Tar Heel League	None	Central High School Park
1954	1	Rutherford County Owls	Class D	Tar Heel League	None	Central High School Park
1960	1	Rutherford County Owls	Class D	Western Carolina League	None	Central High School Park

== Year–by–year records ==
Year	Record	Finish	Manager	Playoffs/Notes
1936	37–61	6th	Maurice Frew / Baxter Moose	Team surrendered to league July 3 (21–25); Team moved to Lexington July 5
1948	55–56	4th	Jess Hill / Gene Hollifield	Lost in 1st round
1949	65–45	3rd	Sam Gibson / Rube Wilson	League champions
1950	57–53	3rd	Rube Wilson	Lost in 1st round
1951	62–348	5th	Rube Wilson	Did not qualify
1952	46–58	4th	Cliff Bolton / William Greene	Lost in 1st round
1953	70–40	2nd	Len Cross / Boger McGimsey	Lost in 1st round
1954	24–24	2nd	Woody Rich / Richard McKeithan	League disbanded June 21
1960	43–56	6th	Jim Poole / Ray Walsh / Len Jackson	Did not qualify

== Notable alumni ==
- Cliff Bolton (1952, MGR)
- Sam Gibson (1949, MGR)
- Kirby Higbe (1953) 2x MLB All-Star
- Jess Hill (1948, MGR)
- Bob Mabe (1950)
- Jim Poole (1960, MGR)
- John Pyecha (1951)
- Woody Rich (1953), (1954, MGR)
- Rutherford County Owls players
- Forest City Owls players
