= Statesville Owls =

- 1900–1969; (1900, 1939–1940, 1942, 1945–1953, 1960–1964, 1966–1967, 1969); Statesville, North Carolina

Minor league affiliations
- Class: Independent (1900); Class D (1939–1942, 1945–1953, 1960–1962); Class A (1963–1964, 1966–1967, 1969)
- League: North Carolina Association (1900); Tar Heel League (1939–1940); North Carolina State League (1942, 1945–1952); Tar Heel League (1953); Western Carolina League (1960–1962); Western Carolinas League (1963–1964, 1966–1967, 1969)

Major league affiliations
- Team: Chicago Cubs (1945–1946); New York Giants (1952); Los Angeles Angels (1961); Boston Red Sox/Houston Colt .45s (1964); Detroit Tigers (1966–1967); Cleveland Indians (1969)

Minor league titles
- League titles (3): 1940; 1948; 1962
- Wild card berths (2): 1939; 1948

Team data
- Name: Statesville (1900); Statesville Owls (1939–1940, 1942); Statesville Cubs (1945–1946); Statesville Owls (1947–1952); Statesville Blues (1953); Statesville Sports (1953); Statesville Owls (1960–1963); Statesville Colts (1964); Statesville Tigers (1966–1967); Statesville Indians (1969)
- Ballpark: Athletic Park (1900); Cooper Field (1939–1940, 1942); Senior High Stadium (1945–1953, 1960–1964, 1966–1967, 1969)

The Statesville Owls were a minor league baseball team located in Statesville, North Carolina. Statesville minor league teams played a member of the North Carolina Association (1900), Tar Heel League (1939–1940), North Carolina State League, (1942, 1945–1952), Tar Heel League (1953), Western Carolina League (1960–1962) and Western Carolinas League (1963–1964, 1966–1967, 1969), winning three league championships.

Statesville teams played as minor league affiliates of the Chicago Cubs (1945–1946), New York Giants (1952), Los Angeles Angels (1961), Boston Red Sox/Houston Colt .45s (1964), Detroit Tigers (1966–1967) and Cleveland Indians (1969).

The Statesville "Owls" moniker was later revived by Statesville teams playing in collegiate summer baseball.

== History ==
Statesville first began minor league baseball play in 1900, as charter members of the Independent level North Carolina Association. Other charter members were the Charlotte Presbyterians, Durham Bulls, Raleigh Senators, Tarboro Tarheels and Wilmington Giants. The Statesville team finished with a record of 8–12 in 1900 playing under manager J.T. Bennett. Statesboro folded after the 1900 season and did not return to the 1901 North Carolina Association.

After a 39–year span, the 1939 Statesville Owls resumed minor league play when the team became charter members of the Class D level Tar Heel League. Joining the Owls as Tar Heel League charter members were the Gastonia Cardinals, Hickory Rebels, Lenoir Indians, Newton-Conover Twins and Shelby Nationals. The Statesville Owls finished with a record of 56–51 to place third in 1939. In the playoffs, Statesville defeated Lenoir 3 games to 0 to advance. In the finals, the Gastonia Cardinals defeated the Owls 4 games to 3.

In 1940, the Statesville Owls finished with a record of 73–37 to place first in the regular season standings, winning the league pennant. In the playoffs, the Owls defeated the Lenoir Indians 3 games to 2 and the Hickory Rebels 4 games to 1 to win the 1940 Tar Heel League Championship. The Tar Heel League folded after the 1940 season.

The Statesville Owls joined the eight-team North Carolina State League in 1942. They finished with a record of 48–51 to place sixth and missed the playoffs. The North Carolina State League ceased play after the 1942 season due to World War II.

When the North Carolina State League resumed play in 1945, Statesville rejoined the league, playing as an affiliate of the Chicago Cubs. The Statesville Cubs finished with a record of 53–58 to place fifth in 1945 and a 41–69 record to place seventh in 1946, missing the playoffs in both seasons.

Statesville continued in the North Carolina State League as the Statesville Owls in 1947. The Owls remained in the League through 1952. After finishing last in 1947, Statesville finished with a record of 63–47 to place second in 1948. In the 1948 playoffs, the Statesville Owls defeated the Lexington Indians 4 games to 1 and the Hickory Rebels 4 games to 3 to win the 1948 North Carolina State League Championship. After fifth-place finishes in 1949 and 1950, the Owls advanced to the 1951 finals, where they were swept by the High Point-Thomasville Hi-Toms.

In 1952, the Statesville Owls became a minor league affiliate of the New York Giants. The Owls finished with a record of 41–68 to place fifth in the 1952 six–team North Carolina State League final standings. The North Carolina State League permanently folded at the conclusion of the 1952 season.

In 1953, Statesville had two teams during the season, both playing in the Tar Heel League. First, the Statesville Blues joined as members of the reorganized ten-team Tar Heel League. The Tar Heel League returned after having folded in 1940. On June 11, 1953, the Statesville Blues, with a record of 13–28, disbanded. On July 12, 1953, Statesville regained a team. The Tar Heel League member Lincolnton Cardinals moved to Statesville, and the Lincolnton/Statesville team completed the 1953 season as the Statesville Sports, finishing with an overall record of 47–64. The Statesville franchise did not return to the Tar Heel League for the 1954 season and the league folded permanently on June 21, 1954, with four teams.

Statesville was without a team until the Statesville Owls joined the reorganized Western Carolina League in 1960. The Owls finished the 1960 season with a record of 38–62 to place 7th. The Statesville Owls became an affiliate of Los Angeles Angels in 1961 and finished second in the Western Carolina League standings. In 1963, the Owls captured the final Western Carolina League Championship. Statesville finished with a record of 62–38 to first place 1st in the standings.

The Western Carolina League evolved into the Western Carolinas League in 1964, playing as a Class A level league. The Statesville Colts played 1964 as a combined affiliate of the Boston Red Sox and Houston Colt .45s, finishing with a record of 52–70 to place seventh. The Colts drew 26,324 for the season, an average of 432 per game. The franchise folded after the 1964 season.

In 1966, the Statesville Tigers rejoined the Western Carolinas League, playing as a minor league affiliate of the Detroit Tigers. The Tigers finished with a record of 42–81 to place seventh in 1966 and a 59–62 record to place fourth in 1967, missing the playoffs in both seasons. The Tigers drew 17,473 in 1967, an average of 289 per game. The Statesville franchise folded after the 1967 season.

The 1969, the Statesville Indians returned to the Western Carolinas League in their final season, playing as an affiliate of the Cleveland Indians. On June 20, 1969, the Indians had a 33–32 record when the franchise moved to Monroe, North Carolina to finish the season as the Monroe Indians. The Statesville/Monroe team finished with a combined record of 61–63 to place third in 1969. Neither Monroe or Statesville fielded a team in 1970.

Statesville, North Carolina has not hosted another minor league team.

The Statesville "Owls" name has been revived by collegiate summer baseball teams playing in Statesville.

== The ballparks ==
The 1900 Statesville team was noted to have played minor league home games at Athletic Park.

The Statesville Owls were referenced to have hosted home minor league games at Cooper Field from 1939 to 1942. The ballpark had a capacity of 4,000 in 1939 and dimensions (Left, Center, Right) of 410–410–325 in 1939. Cooper Park is still in existence as a public park, located at Wilson Lee Avenue &, Goldsboro Avenue, Statesville, North Carolina

In the seasons between 1945 and 1969, Statesville minor league teams played home games at Senior High Stadium, located at Statesville High School. The ballpark had a capacity of 3,600 in 1950 and 2,000 in 1967 with dimensions (Left, Center, Right) of 414–386–308 in 1950, 340–408–287 in 1961 and 321–426–287 in 1969. Sometimes called "High School Park" or "City Park Stadium", the ballpark is still in use at Statesville High School. The address is 474 North Center Street, Statesville, North Carolina.

== Notable alumni ==
- Rob Belloir (1969) (1953, MGR)
- George Bradshaw (1950, MGR)
- Fred Chapman (1953, MGR)
- Tony Daniels (1949–1950)
- Jake Early (1960, MGR) MLB All-Star
- Ed Farmer (1969) MLB All-Star; MLB Announcer
- Jack Hiatt (1961)
- Larry Johnson (1969)
- Tom Kelley (1969)
- Gene Lamont (1966) 1993 AL Manager of the Year
- Bill Miller (1948)
- John Paciorek (1964)
- Jim Poole (1942, 1945, MGR)
- Dick Simpson (1961)
- George Spencer (1966, MGR)
- J. C. Snead (1962) PGA Tour golfer
- George Wilson (1942, 1961)
- Rudy York (1964, MGR) 7x MLB All-Star
- Statesville Owls players
- Statesville Blues players
- Statesville Colts players
- Statesvlle Cubs players
- Statesville Tigers players
- Statesville/Monroe Indians players
