= John Henry Moss =

American politician (1918–2009)

- Minor League Baseball executive and Politician
- Born: November 10, 1918; Kings Mountain, North Carolina
- Died: July 1, 2009 (aged 90); Kings Mountain, North Carolina

Career highlights and awards
- Western Carolina League president (1948–1949); Detroit Tigers Minor League system director (1950–1958); Western Carolinas League president (1959–1979); South Atlantic League president (1980–2007); Mayor of Kings Mountain, North Carolina (1965–1988); Warren C. Giles Award (1993); South Atlantic League Hall of Fame (1994); North Carolina Sports Hall of Fame (2004); North Carolina American Legion Sports Hall of Fame (2004); Kings Mountain Sports Hall of Fame (2004); Cleveland County Sports Hall of Fame (2004); South Atlantic League Celebration Tour (2008); John Henry Moss Stadium Opening (2009)

John Henry Moss (November 10, 1918 – July 1, 2009) was a baseball executive and politician. Well known for his strong leadership and organizational skills, Moss was a key contributor to the development of Minor League Baseball during more than six decades, helping bring professional baseball to 43 United States cities represented by 114 ownership groups, by stressing the importance of providing quality, wholesome, family-friendly entertainment at an affordable price. Over the years, Moss gained inductions into five Halls of Fame and also received numerous honours for his commendable contributions to baseball.

== Early life ==
Moss was born in Kings Mountain, North Carolina, as the son of Manuel A. Moss and Amanda Oates Moss. As a young man, he started the Western Carolina League (now known as the South Atlantic League) in 1948 and re-founded it in 1960, transforming a regional eight-team Class-D league into one of the nation's most highly regarded Class-A leagues over the years. Moss was just 29 years old in 1948, making him the youngest person ever to be president of a professional baseball league.

== Minor league player and founder ==
Moss began his baseball career as a minor leaguer in 1940, playing briefly for the Shelby Colonels of the Tar Heel League, a Class-D affiliate of the Washington Senators. He then joined the US Army and served during World War II.

Upon returning to Kings Mountain in 1947, Moss founded the aforementioned semi-professional Western Carolina League. Before the 1948 season, having established eight franchises in North Carolina cities like Hendersonville, Lenoir, Lincolnton, Marion, Morganton, Shelby, and Newton–Conover, the league was approved for membership in the National Association of Professional Baseball Leagues, now known as Minor League Baseball. The Western Carolina League was classified as a Class-D league, at the lowest level the ranks of organized baseball (equivalent to a Rookie-level league today).

Moss left the league in 1950 and for nine years worked as a general manager for several Minor League teams affiliated with the Detroit Tigers. The Western Carolina League had been folded into another league in the interim, and when Moss returned in 1959, he reorganized it as the Western Carolinas League. It was revived as a Class-D circuit intended for farm teams of member clubs of a planned third Major League circuit, the Continental League, which had been founded by lawyer William Shea to play organized baseball in the United States and Canada. The threat of a third major league prompted Major League Baseball to discuss expansion. By the time, the Western Carolinas League featured eight teams based in North Carolina, but eventually would expand to various cities of South Carolina.

After the Continental League was blocked by the Major League Baseball expansion in 1961 and 1962, the members of the Western Carolinas League led by Moss became affiliates of American and National League clubs. It was upgraded to Class-A in the 1963 reorganization of Minor League Baseball, and subsequently renamed South Atlantic League in 1980. During the 2003 MLB baseball season, 42.5 percent of the 1,200 players on major league teams were graduates of the South Atlantic League.

In the process, Moss headed the circuit until 2007 and boasted 16 franchises spread out across eight states, stretching from south Georgia to New Jersey and westward to Ohio and Kentucky, with half of these clubs playing in facilities constructed in 2001 or later. During this time, Moss received invaluable assistance from his wife Elaine Caroline Beilke Moss, who served as the league's director of administration and finance for 45 years, until her death in 2004. They had no children.

== Mayor ==
A stern figure known for his formality and rectitude, Moss was a businessman at least as much as he was a baseball man. In addition to his league responsibilities, Moss also served as Mayor of Kings Mountain from 1965 through 1988, during which time he earned national recognition by securing more than $40 million in federal grants, resulting in numerous improvement projects, to the extent that the Newsweek magazine called him the "Mayor with the Midas touch." His 22 years in office saw improvements at the water and sewer treatment facilities, as the lake that he envisioned during a long time became reality in 1973, assuring the city an abundant supply of water and also as serving as an active recreational destination for boaters, fishermen and water tournaments. This project included the building of the Kings Mountain Reservoir, also known as Moss Lake, named in his honor. The Moss Lake was noted by the Cleveland County Chamber of Commerce as one of the top five most important events of the 20th century in Cleveland Count history.

== Honors ==
Moss was dubbed "King of Baseball" in 1990 and received the prestigious Warren C. Giles Award in 1993. The next year, he was enshrined the South Atlantic League Hall of Fame.

Moreover, Moss was inducted into the North Carolina Sports Hall of Fame as part of their 2004 class, and also in the North Carolina American Legion Sports Hall of Fame, the Kings Mountain Sports Hall of Fame, and the Cleveland County Sports Hall of Fame. Gardner–Webb University in Boiling Springs, North Carolina named its ballpark John Henry Moss Stadium as a tribute to his long-term relationship with the school and his significant financial contributions to it.

Following his retirement in 2007, Moss was honored by the South Atlantic League throughout the 2008 season. The league's board of directors voted at the Baseball Winter Meetings held in Nashville to retire the uniform number 50 throughout the South Atlantic League, to honor Moss for his dedicated 50 years of service to the circuit. According to South Atlantic League records, the only other number that is retired league-wide is the number 42, honoring Jackie Robinson, which was retired throughout Minor League Baseball in 1997. It was followed by the event 2008 Celebration Tour, which was hosted at each of the league's 16 ballparks, where each club honored Moss during a pre-game ceremony. Additionally, a cast bronze plaque was installed in each park to pay tribute for his 50 years of outstanding service to the Western Carolinas/South Atlantic League.

Moss died in his native Kings Mountain on July 1, 2009, aged 90. He had been hospitalized at the Kings Mountain Hospital after suffering a stroke on June 7.

Beginning 2013, Minor League Baseball created the John Henry Moss Community Service Award, which is presented annually at the Baseball Winter Meetings. The award honors Moss for his dedication and charitable service to baseball and his community during his 50-year tenure as a league president, and is presented to a Minor League club that has demonstrated an outstanding, on-going commitment to charitable service and has exhibited support and leadership within its local community and the baseball industry throughout the season.

Award winners

Year	Team	League
2013	Grand Junction Rockies	Pioneer League
2014	Pawtucket Red Sox	International League
2015	Fort Wayne TinCaps	Midwest League
2016	Round Rock Express	Pacific Coast League
