= Alex Cosmidis =

American baseball player, manager, and scout (1928–2019)

Alexander Nicholas Cosmidis (September 22, 1928 – June 26, 2019) was an American professional baseball player, manager, and scout. He spent 11 seasons as an infielder and eight seasons as a manager, all in Minor League Baseball. He later served as a scout for two Major League Baseball teams.

== Biography ==
Born in Fayetteville, North Carolina, Cosmidis grew up in Norfolk, Virginia, and went to school at Illinois Wesleyan University where he played baseball and joined Theta Chi. During this time, he was also on a semi-professional team in Colerain, North Carolina.

Cosmidis was signed by the Chicago White Sox who assigned him to their farm team in Hot Springs, Arkansas (Hot Springs Bathers), where he earned co-MVP honors in the Cotton States League. His minor league playing career saw him in Waterloo, Iowa; Gastonia, North Carolina (Gastonia Rockets); and Nashville, Tennessee (Nashville Vols), playing for local teams. He spent three years with the team in Dallas and set a Texas League fielding record of 66 errorless games at second base. In 1957, he was awarded the Rawlings Silver Glove trophy for best minor league second baseman. He spent a campaign with Portland in the Pacific Coast League and one with Rochester in the International League at the Triple-A level but never made it to the major leagues as a player.

After a knee injury in 1960, Cosmidis turned to managing. In 1961, his team from Salisbury won the Western Carolina League trophy. He also managed in Asheville, Salem, Appleton, and Lynchburg before rounding out his managerial career with the Kinston Eagles of the Carolina League in 1970.

Cosmidis returned to baseball in 1982 as a scout for the California Angels. Starting in 1987, he worked as a scout for the Chicago White Sox and was based in Raleigh, North Carolina. His signees include Bryan Harvey, Roberto Hernandez, Ray Durham and James Baldwin.

Cosmidis died on June 26, 2019.
