= Gastonia Cardinals =

- 1938–1982; (1938-1940, 1977-1982); Gastonia, North Carolina

Minor league affiliations
- Class: Class D (1938–1940); Class A (1977–1982)
- League: North Carolina State League (1938); Tar Heel League (1939–1940); Western Carolinas League (1977–1979); South Atlantic League (1980–1982)

Major league affiliations
- Team: St. Louis Cardinals (1938–1940; 1977–1982)

Minor league titles
- League titles (2): 1939; 1977
- Conference titles (2): 1939; 1977
- Wild card berths (3): 1938; 1940; 1980

Team data
- Name: Gastonia Cardinals (1938–1940; 1977–1982)
- Ballpark: Gastonia High School Stadium (1938–1940); Sims Legion Park (1977–1982)

The Gastonia Cardinals were a minor league baseball team based in Gastonia, North Carolina on two separate occasions, playing as a minor league affiliate of the St. Louis Cardinals in both instances.

The first Gastonia Cardinals team played as members of the Class D level North Carolina State League in 1938 and the Tar Heel League in 1939 and 1940, winning the 1939 league championship. Three decades later, the second Cardinals team played from 1977 to 1982 as members of the Class A level Western Carolinas League (winning the 1977 league championship) and its 1980 successor, the South Atlantic League.

The Cardinals teams hosted home minor league games from 1938 to 1940 at the Gastonia High School Stadium and subsequently at Sims Legion Park, which is still in use today.

== History ==
=== 1938 to 1940 North Carolina State League / Tar Heel League ===
Gastonia first hosted minor league baseball in 1923, when the "Gastonia Comers" played a partial season as members of the Class B level South Atlantic League.

The first Gastonia Cardinals team was immediately preceded in minor league play by the 1938 "Gastonia Spinners," who played a portion of the season as members of the Independent level Carolina League in the final season of the league.

After the Gastonia Spinners relocated during the 1938 Carolina League season, Gastonia quickly gained another team. The Gastonia "Cardinals" began play for the first time on July 22, 1938, when the Shelby Cardinals franchise of the eight-team, Class D level North Carolina State League relocated to Gastonia. Shelby had a record of 47–23 at the time of the move and were a minor league affiliate of the St. Louis Cardinals.

The team compiled a record of 19–22 after the move to Gastonia. Overall, the Shelby/Gastonia team ended the regular season in second place with a record of 66–45, playing under manager George Silvey. Gastonia finished 9.0 games behind the Thomasville Tommies in the final regular season standings and qualified for the playoffs. In the first round of the four-team playoffs the Cardinals were swept by the eventual champion Mooresville Moors in three games. Gastonia's Gene Nafie led the North Carolina State League with both 27 home runs and 120 runs scored, while player/manager George Silvey topped the league with 80 stolen bases.

In 1939, Gastonia continued play as a minor league affiliate of the St. Louis Cardinals, while joining a newly formed league. The 1939 Gastionia Cardinals became charter members of the six-team, Class D level Tar Heel League. The Hickory Rebels, Lenoir Indians, Newton-Conover Twins, Shelby Nationals and Statesville Owls joined Gastonia in beginning league play.

In their first season of league play, the Gastonia Cardinals won the 1939 Tar Heel League pennant and championship. The Cardinals ended the Tar Heel League regular season with a record of 72–36, placing first in the standings, finishing 10.5 games ahead of the second place Lenoir Indians. Al Unser served as the Gastonia manager. In the first round of the four-team playoffs, Gastonia defeated the Shelby Nationals three games to one to advance. In the Finals, Gastonia defeated the Statesville Owls in seven games to win the championship. Hooper Triplett of Gastonia won the league triple crown, hitting .391 with 27 home runs and 115 RCI. Teammate Miles Gardner had 17 wins to lead the Tar Heel league in that category.

The Cardinals continued play as the 1940 Tar Heel League remained with the original six teams, in what proved to be the final season of the first Gastonia Cardinals team. Gastonia finished second in the regular season standing and qualified for the playoffs. The Cardinals ended the regular season with a 64–44 record, playing under manager Milt Bocek, while finishing 8.0 games behind the first place Statesville Owls. In the playoffs, the Cardinals were swept in three games by the Hickory Rebels. Player/manager Mile Bocek led the Tar Heel League with both a .367 average and 109 RBI.

Gastonia folded and did not return to play in the 1941 Tar Heel League, as the league expanded to eight teams without the Gastonia franchise.

=== 1977 to 1979 Western Carolinas League ===
The 1977 Gastonia Cardinals were reformed as a minor league affiliate of the St. Louis Cardinals, playing as members of the six-team, Class A level Western Carolinas League, as the league expanded from four teams to six, adding Gastonia and the Shelby Reds franchises. The Cardinals were preceded in Western Carolinas League play by the 1974 Gastonia Rangers. The Cardinals were joined in the 1977 Western Carolinas League by the Asheville Tourists, Charleston Patriots, Greenwood Braves, Shelby Reds and Spartanburg Phillies.

On April 16, 1977, the Gastonia Cardinals won their first game, a 12–4 victory, playing at the Spartanburg Phillies.

The 1977 Gastonia Cardinals won the Western Carolinas League championship, playing the season under manager Hal Lanier. With a record of 82–57, the Cardinals captured the league pennant, finishing 1.0 game ahead of the second place Ashville Tourists in the overall standings. Gastionia was the second half winner of the split-season schedule and played the first half winner, the Greenwood Braves in the playoff. Gastonia defeated the Braves three games to one in the Final to capture the league championship.

In 1978, the Cardinals placed fifth in the six team Western Carolinas League. Gastonia ended the season with a 69–71 record, finishing 13.5 games behind the first place Greenwood Braves in the final standings. Buzzy Keller was the Gastonia manager. No playoffs were held as Greenwood won both halves of the split season schedule.

The Western Carolinas League played its final season in 1979. The Cardinals again placed fifth in the final standings of the six-team league. Playing the season under manager Johnny Lewis, Gastonia compiled a record of 65–74, finishing 13.5 games behind the first place Greenwood Braves. Gastonia did not qualify for the playoffs, won by Greenwood. Cardinal pitcher Jerry Johnson led the Western Carolinas League with a 2.65 ERA.

=== 1980 to 1982 South Atlantic League ===
In 1980, the Western Carolinas League was renamed as the league evolved to become the eight-team Class A level South Atlantic League. The six Western Carolinas franchises remained, with the Anderson Braves and Macon Peaches joining the league, which was divided into two four-team divisions.

In their first season of the new league, the Cardinals placed second in the North Division of the South Atlantic League and qualified for the 1980 league playoffs. Gastonia finished the season with a 64–66 record, playing under manager Nick Leyva. The Cardinals finished 8.5 games behind the division winner Greensboro Hornets. In the first round of the four-team playoffs, Gastonia lost to Greensboro two games to one. Ralph Citarella of Gastonia led South Atlantic League pitchers with a 1.64 ERA.

The South Atlantic League expanded in 1982, becoming a ten-team league, as the Spartanburg Phillies and Florence Blue Jays became new members. The Gastonia Cardinals placed fourth in the five-team North Division in 1981, missing the South Atlantic League playoffs. Playing the season under manager Joe Rigoli, Gastonia ended the regular season with a 68–76 record to finish 31.5 games behind the division champion Greensboro Hornets. Greensboro was the eventual league champion.

Gastonia played their final season as the "Cardinals" in 1982. Continuing play in the five-team North Division of the South Atlantic League, the Cardinals finished in fifth place. The Cardinals ended the season with a record of 54–89. Playing the season under manager Lloyd Merritt, Gastonia finished 43.0 games behind the first place and eventual league champion Greensboro Hornets in the North Division. The Gastonia Cardinals' final game was on August 31, 1982, an 8–7 loss against the Spartanburg Traders.

In 1983, the Gastonia franchise continued play in the South Atlantic League, becoming the Gastonia Expos, as a minor league affiliate of the Montreal Expos.

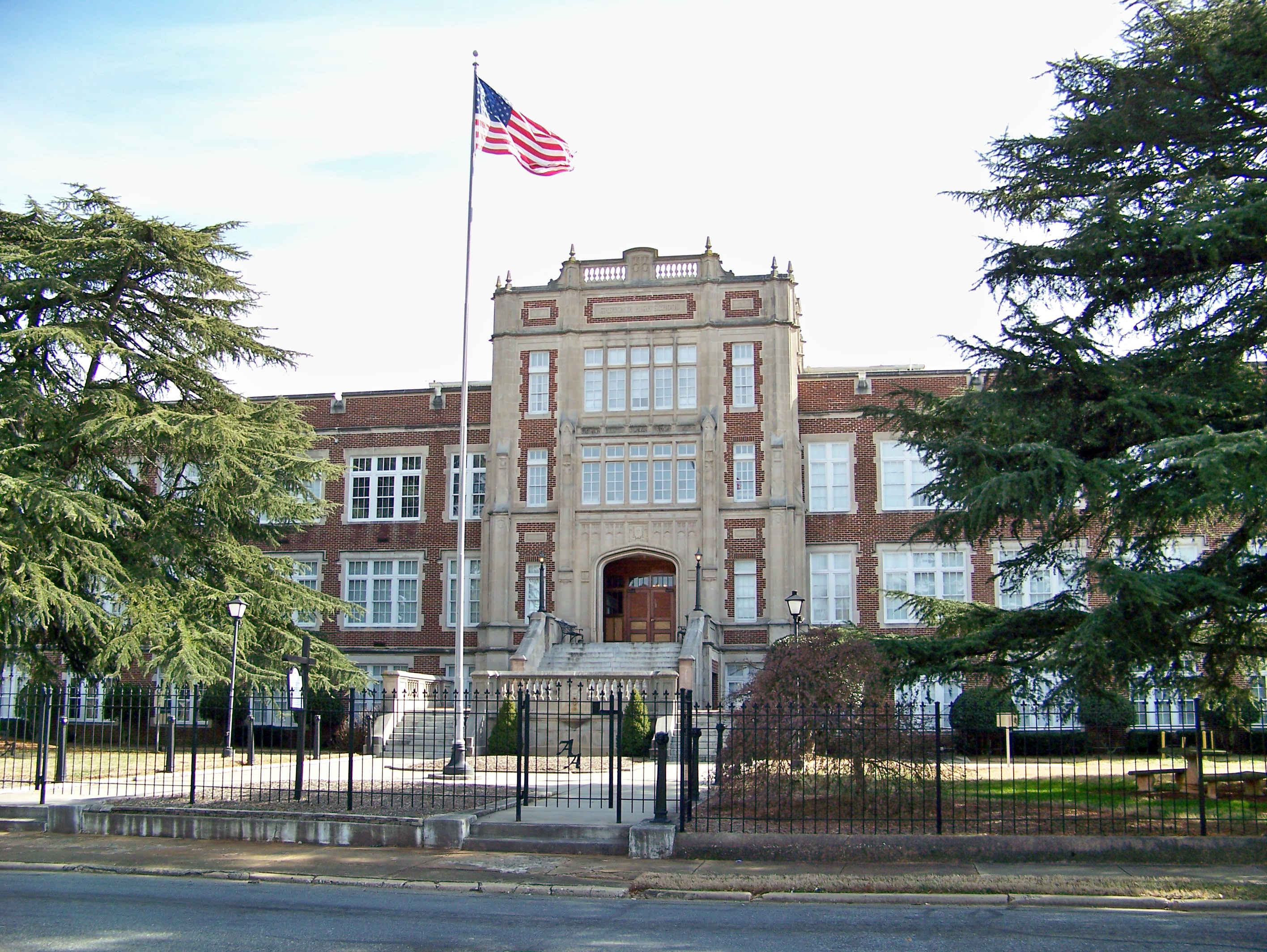
(2014) Former Gastonia High School, now Ashley Arms Apartments. National Register of Historic Places. Gastonia, North Carolina.

== The ballparks ==
From 1938 to 1940, the Gastonia Cardinals of the North Carolina State League and Tar Heel League hosted home games at the Gastonia High School Stadium. The ballpark had a capacity of 3,000, with field dimensions of (Left-Center-Right): 340-415-355 in 1939 and 325-360-360 in 1940. The ballpark was located at Gastonia High School between west 7th Street and West 8th Street. The high school building still exists today, repurposed as a residential building and is listed on the National Register of Historic Places.

The 1977 to 1982 Gastonia Cardinals hosted minor league home games at Sims Legion Park. The original Sims Legion Park was built in 1950. The ballpark was essentially reconstructed with a major renovation in 1977 and was greatly updated again in 2021.

When the Cardinals began play at the ballpark in 1977, the renovation to Sims Legion Park was still ongoing, with the grandstands and locker rooms incomplete. For a time, the teams dressed at Wray Junior High School, which was three miles away from the ballpark. Still in use today, the ballpark is located at 1001 North Marietta Street.

== Timeline ==
| Year(s) | # Yrs. | Team | Level | League | Affiliate | Ballpark |
|---|---|---|---|---|---|---|
| 1938 | 1 | Gastonia Cardinals | Class D | North Carolina State League | St. Louis Cardinals | Gastonia High School Stadium |
| 1939–1940 | 2 | Gastonia Cardinals | Class D | Tar Heel League | St. Louis Cardinals | Gastonia High School Stadium |
| 1977–1979 | 3 | Gastonia Cardinals | Class A | Western Carolinas League | St. Louis Cardinals | Sims Legion Park |
| 1980–1979 | 3 | Gastonia Cardinals | Class A | South Atlantic League | St. Louis Cardinals | Sims Legion Park |

== Year–by–year records ==
| Year | Record | Finish | Manager | Playoffs / Notes |
|---|---|---|---|---|
| 1938 | 66–45 | 2nd | George Silvey | Shelby (47–23) moved to Gastonia July 23; Lost in 1st round |
| 1939 | 72–36 | 1st | Al Unser | League champions |
| 1940 | 64–44 | 2nd | Milt Bocek | Lost in 1st round |
| 1977 | 82–57 | 1st | Hal Lanier | League champions |
| 1978 | 69–71 | 5th | Buzzy Keller | No playoffs held |
| 1979 | 65–74 | 5th | Johnny Lewis | Did not qualify |
| 1980 | 74–66 | 2nd | Nick Leyva | Lost in 1st round |
| 1981 | 68–76 | 4th | Joe Rigoli | Did not qualify |
| 1982 | 54–89 | 5th | Lloyd Merritt | Did not qualify |

== Notable alumni ==
- Gibson Alba (1981)
- Bill Ayers (1938)
- George Bjorkman (1978)
- Milt Bocek (1940, MGR)
- Ralph Citarella (1980)
- Terry Clark (1980–1981)
- Joe DeSa (1978)
- Jeff Doyle (1979)
- Tom Dozier (1981)
- Leon Durham (1977) 2x MLB All-Star
- Neil Fiala (1977)
- Glenn Gardner (1938–1939)
- Jim Gott (1978–1979)
- Kevin Hagen (1980)
- Ricky Horton (1980)
- Hal Lanier (1977, MGR)
- Nick Leyva (1980, MGR)
- Bobby Meacham (1981)
- Lloyd Merritt (1982, MGR)
- Al Olmsted (1977–1978)
- Kelly Paris (1978)
- Joe Rigoli (1981, MGR)
- Andy Rincon (1978)
- Mark Riggins (1979)
- Gene Roof (1977)
- Mark Salas (1980)
- Ray Searage (1978)
- Al Unser (1939, MGR)
- Andy Van Slyke (1980) 3x MLB All-Star

== See also ==
- Gastonia Cardinals players
