= Lenoir Red Sox =

- 1946–1951; (1937–1940, 1946–1951); Lenoir, North Carolina

Minor league affiliations
- Class: Independent (1937–1938); Class D (1939–1940, 1946–1951)
- League: Carolina League (1937–1938); Tar Heel League (1939–1940); Blue Ridge League (1946–1947); Western Carolina League (1948–1951)

Major league affiliations
- Team: Cincinnati Reds (1940); New York Giants (1949–1951)

Minor league titles
- League titles (3): 1938; 1946; 1950
- Wild card berths (3): 1940; 1947; 1950

Team data
- Name: Lenoir Indians (1937-1939); Lenoir Reds (1940); Lenoir Red Sox (1946–1951)
- Ballpark: Lenoir High School Field (1937–1940, 1946–1951)

The Lenoir Red Sox were a minor league baseball team based in Lenoir, North Carolina. Between 1937 and 1951, Lenoir teams played as members of the 1937 and 1938 Carolina League, 1939 and 1940 Tar Heel League, 1946 and 1947 Blue Ridge League and the Western Carolina League from 1948 to 1951, winning three league championships. Lenoir teams hosted home minor league games at the Lenoir High School Field.

After playing as the unaffiliated Lenoir "Indians" from 1937 to 1939, the 1940 Lenoir "Reds" were a minor league affiliate of the Cincinnati Reds. The franchise resumed play in 1946 with the Lenoir "Red Sox" who then became an affiliate of the New York Giants from 1949 to 1951.

== History ==
=== 1937–1940 Carolina League / Tar Heel League ===
In 1937, the Lenoir Indians began minor league play. Lenoir played as members of the six–team Independent level Carolina League, formally called the "Carolina Baseball League." The league was referred to as an "outlaw" league because of the Independent status. Most of the other league members had previously hosted numerous semi–pro teams in the Carolina Textile League, made up of locals and mill workers. The 1937 Indians finished with a record of 42–54 to place fifth, playing under player/manager Baxter Moose. Lenoir finished 12.5 games behind the first place Kannapolis Towelers. The Carolina League Lenoir franchise is listed in some references as the "Finishers."

The 1938 Lenoir Indians won the Carolina League Championship. The Indians finished the season in first place in the six–team final league standings with a 60–39 record, playing under manager Bobby Hipps. Lenoir finished 4.0 games ahead of the second place Hickory Rebels in the final standings. No playoffs were held. The Carolina League folded following the 1938 season, resuming play in 1945, affected by World War II.

In 1939, the Lenoir Indians continued play, becoming members of the six–team Class D level Tar Heel League. The Indians placed 2nd in the standings and finished the season with 61–46 record, playing under managers Lefty Guise and Clarence Roper. Lenoir finished 10.5 games behind the first place Gastonia Cardinals in the final regular season standings. In the playoffs, the Statesville Owls defeated Lenoir 3 games to 0.

Continuing play in the 1940 Tar Heel League, Lenoir became a minor league affiliate of the Cincinnati Reds, and began play as the Lenoir Reds. The Lenoir Reds finished with a record of 53–55 to place fourth in the regular season standings, finishing 19.0 games behind the first place Statesville Owls. Playing under manager Ray Rice, the Reds advanced to the playoffs, where they lost in 1st round, where Statesville defeated Lenoir 4 games to 2 in their playoff series.

=== 1946–1951 Blue Ridge League / Western Carolina League ===
In 1946, the Lenoir "Red Sox" became charter members of the four–team Class D level Blue Ridge League during the season. The Galax Leafs, Mount Airy Graniteers and Radford Rockets and Salem Friends began 1946 league play, which commenced on May 1, 1946. The Salem franchise moved to Lenoir during the season.

In their first season of play in the new league, the 1946 Lenoir "Red Sox" won 1946 Blue Ridge League championship after the relocation of Salem. On June 25, 1946, the Salem Friends franchise relocated to Lenoir with a 20–8 record. After compiling a 51–27 record while based in Lenoir, the Salem/Lenoir team placed first in the final league standings, playing the season under managers Vernon Mackey and Noel Casbier. The Red Sox ended the season with an overall record of 71–35 and finished the season 11.0 games ahead of the second place Mount Airy Graniteers team as no playoffs were held.

Defending their league championship in the 1947 Blue Ridge League, the Lenoir Red Sox reached the four–team league finals. After a regular season record of 43–73, the team placed fourth and last in the standings as the league implemented a new playoff system that involved all four teams. Playing under manager Noel Casbier, Lenoir finished 28.5 games behind the first place Galax Leafs. In the playoffs, Lenoir defeated the Mount Airy Graniteers 3 games to 1 to advance. In the Finals, the Galax Leafs won the championship after defeating Lenoir 4 games to 3.

The 1948 Lenoir Red Sox continued play in a new league, as Lenoir became charter members of the eight–team Class D level Western Carolina League. The Forest City Owls, Hendersonville Skylarks, Lincolnton Cardinals, Marion Marauders, Morganton Aggies, Newton-Conover Twins and Shelby Farmers teams joined Lenoir as charter members.

Beginning Western Carolina League play on April 30, 1948, the Lenoir Red Sox placed seventh in the regular season final standings. With a record of 49–61, playing under managers Jack McLain and Claude Jonnard, Lenoir finished 20.0 games behind the first place Lincolnton Cardinals in the Western Carolina League regular season standings. Lenoir did not qualify for the four–team playoffs.

The 1949 Lenoir Red Sox kept their nickname as the team became a minor league affiliate of the New York Giants, an affiliation that would last through the 1951 season. Lenoir placed fifth in the 1949 Western Carolina League regular season standings, missing the playoffs. The Red Sox ended the season with a record of 57–50 under returning manager Claude Jonnard, finishing 14.5 games behind the first place Newton-Conover Twins. Pitcher Walter Lentz of Lenoir led the league with a 3.03 ERA.

In 1950, the Lenoir Red Sox won the Western Carolina League championship. In the regular season, Lenoir placed second with a 67–40 record, managed again by Claude Jonnard. Lenoir finished 0.5 game behind the first place Newton-Conover Twins (69–41) in the final regular standings, with .001 separating the teams. In the first round of the playoffs, the Lenoir Red Sox defeated the Marion Marauders 4 games to 3 to advance. In the Finals, Lenoir won another seven-game series, defeating Newton-Conover 4 games to 3 to win the championship. Robert Featherstone of Lenoir led the Western Carolina League with 27 home runs.

In their final season of play, the 1951 Lenoir Red Sox placed seventh in the Western Carolina League regular season standings. Lenoir finished with a record of 40–70, managed by Claude Jonnard, Okey Flowers and John Olsen. Lenoir did not qualify for the playoffs in the eight–team Western Carolina League. Rutherford County finished with a regular season record of 62–48 to place fifth in the regular season standings, playing under returning manager Rube Wilson. The Red Sox finished their final season 31.0 games behind the first place Morganton Aggies in the final regular season standings.

The 1952 Western Carolina League played the season reduced to six teams, after Lenoir folded. Lenoir, North Carolina has not hosted another minor league franchise.

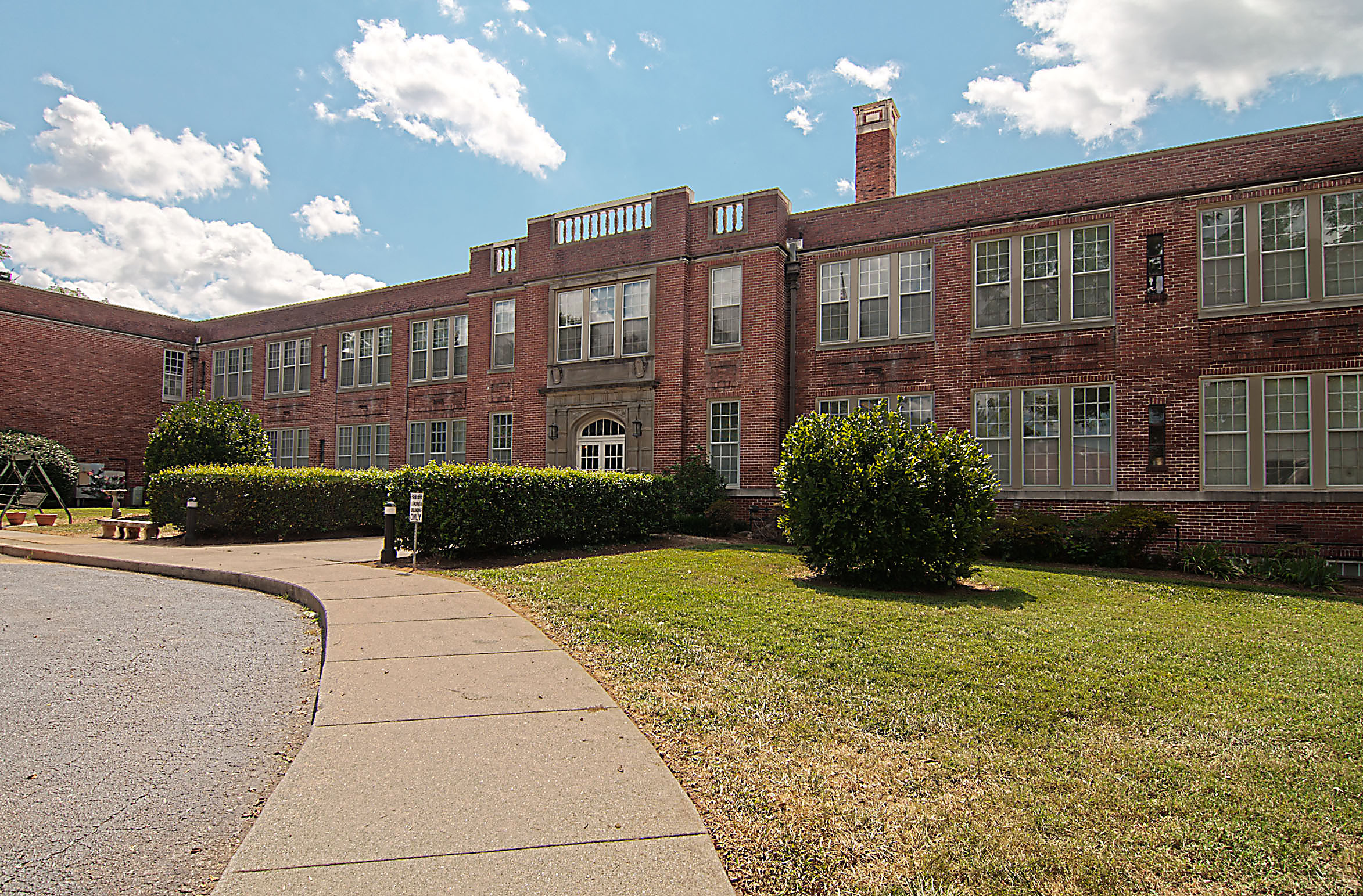
(2016) Former Lenoir High School. National Register of Historic Places. Lenoir, North Carolina

== The ballpark ==
The Lenoir teams hosted minor league home games at Lenoir High School Field. In the era, the ballpark was reportedly located behind the high school at 521 West College Avenue, Lenoir, North Carolina. Today, Lenoir High School is closed as a public school, but is still in use as a residential facility and was placed on the National Register of Historic Places in 1990. The building is located at 100 Willow Street SW, Lenoir, North Carolina.

== Timeline ==
Year(s)	# Yrs.	Team	Level	League	Affiliate	Ballpark
1937–1938	2	Lenoir Indians	Independent	Carolina League	None	Lenoir High School Field
1939	1	Lenoir Indians	Class D	Tar Heel League	None	Lenoir High School Field
1940	1	Lenoir Reds	Class D	Tar Heel League	Cincinnati Reds	Lenoir High School Field
1946–1947	2	Lenoir Red Sox	Class D	Blue Ridge League	None	Lenoir High School Field
1948	1	Lenoir Red Sox	Class D	Western Carolina League	None	Lenoir High School Field
1949–1951	3	Lenoir Red Sox	Class D	Western Carolina League	New York Giants	Lenoir High School Field

== Year–by–year records ==
Year	Record	Finish	Manager	Playoffs/Notes
1937	42–54	5th	Baxter Moose	No playoffs held
1938	60–39	1st	Bobby Hipps	League champions
1939	61–46	2nd	Clarence Roper	No playoffs held
1940	53–55	4th	Ray Rice	Lost in 1st round
1946	51–27	1st	Vernon Mackey / Noel Casbier	League champions Salem (20–8) moved to Lenoir June 25
1947	43–73	4th	Noel Casbier	Lost in finals
1948	49–61	7th	Jack McLain / Claude Jonnard	Did not qualify
1949	57-50	5th	Claude Jonnard	Did not qualify
1950	67–40	2nd	Claude Jonnard	League champions
1951	40–70	7th	Claude Jonnard / Okey Flowers / John Olsen	Did not qualify

== Notable alumni ==
- Marv Felderman (1939)
- Wally Flager (1940)
- Lefty Guise (1939)
- Gail Harris (1950)
- Claude Jonnard (1948–1951, MGR)
- Chuck Kress (1940)
- Johnny Kucab (1940)
- Bob Schmidt (1951) MLB All–Star
- Mule Shirley (1937)
- Lenoir Red Sox players
- Lenoir Reds players
