= Morganton Aggies =

- 1948–1952; Morganton, North Carolina

Minor league affiliations
- Class: Class D (1948–1952)
- League: Western Carolina League (1948–1952)

Major league affiliations
- Team: None

Minor league titles
- League titles (0): None
- Conference titles (1): 1951
- Wild card berths (2): 1948; 1949

Team data
- Name: Morganton Aggies (1948–1952)
- Ballpark: Morganton High School Park (1948–1952)

The Morganton Aggies were a minor league baseball team based in Morganton, North Carolina. From 1948 to 1952, the Aggies played exclusively as members of the Class D level Western Carolina League, winning the 1951 league pennant. Morgantown hosted home minor league games at the Morganton High School Park.

== History ==
Morganton, North Carolina first hosted league baseball play in 1948, when the Morganton "Aggies" became charter members of the eight–team Class D level Western Carolina League. The Forest City Owls, Hendersonville Skylarks, Lenoir Red Sox, Lincolnton Cardinals, Marion Marauders, Newton-Conover Twins and Shelby Farmers teams joined Morganton as charter members.

In their first season of play the Morganton Aggies placed third in Western Carolina League regular season standings. Ending the regular season with a record of 54–53 and qualifying for the league four-playoffs. Playing the season under managers Les McGarity, Homer Daugherty, Wayne Stewart and Boger McGimsey, Morganton finished 13.5 games behind the first place Lincolnton Cardinals in the Western Carolina League regular season standings. In the first round of the 1948 playoffs, Lincolnton defeated Morganton 4 games to 2. The Cardinals then defeated Newton-Conover in the finals to win the league championship.

The Morganton Aggies placed fourth in the 1949 Western Carolina League regular season standings and reached the playoff Finals the eight–team league. The Aggies ended the regular season with a record of 58–49, playing under manager Sam Bell. The Wagonmakers finished 13.5 games behind the first place Newton-Conover Twins and qualified for the playoffs. In the first round of the playoffs, the Aggies defeated the Lincolnton Cardinals 4 games to 3 to advance to the final. In the Western Carolina League Finals, the Rutherford County Owls defeated the Morganton Aggies 4 games to 1 to win the championship. Morganton's Boger McGimsey led the Western Carolina League with 118 RBI, while teammate Lelon Jaynes of Morganton led the league pitchers with both 19 wins and 202 strikeouts.

In 1950, Morgantown placed fifth in the Western Carolina League final regular season standings. Managed by the returning Sam Bell, Homer Daugherty and Jim Poole, Morganton ended the season with a record of 54–57 to finish 15.5 games behind the first place Newton-Conover Twins in the final regular standings. With their fifth place finish in the eight–team league, Morganton did not qualify for the playoffs, won by the Lenoir Red Sox.

The 1951 Morganton Aggies won the Western Carolina League pennant and reached the league finals. Morganton finished with a regular season record of 71–39 to place first in the regular season standings, playing under manager George Bradshaw. Morganton finished 4.5 games ahead of the second place Shelby Farmers. In the Western Carolina League playoffs, Morganton defeated the Lincolnton Cardinals 4 games to 3 to advance. In the Finals, the Shelby Farmers defeated Morganton Aggies 4 games to 3 in the seven-game series. Aggie player Bordie Waddle led the Western Carolina League with 24 home runs. Pitcher Pete Treece of Morganton led the league with both 25 wins and 263 strikeouts.

In their final season of play, the Morganton Aggies folded during the 1952 Western Carolina League season. The league began the season reduced to six teams. On August 3, 1951, Morganton folded. The Aggies had a record of 41–51 playing under managers George Bradshaw and Pete Treece when the franchise permanently folded. The Western Carolina League completed the 1952 season with five teams.

After the 1952 season, the Western Carolina League combined with the North Carolina State League to form the Tar Heel League, playing in 1953 and 1954 before folding and then resuming play in 1960, without Morganton as a member in each instance. Morganton, North Carolina has not hosted another minor league team.

From 2005 to 2013, Morganton hosted the "Morganton Aggies," who revived the former nickname, as the new amateur team played summer collegiate baseball as members of the Southern Collegiate Baseball League for nine seasons.

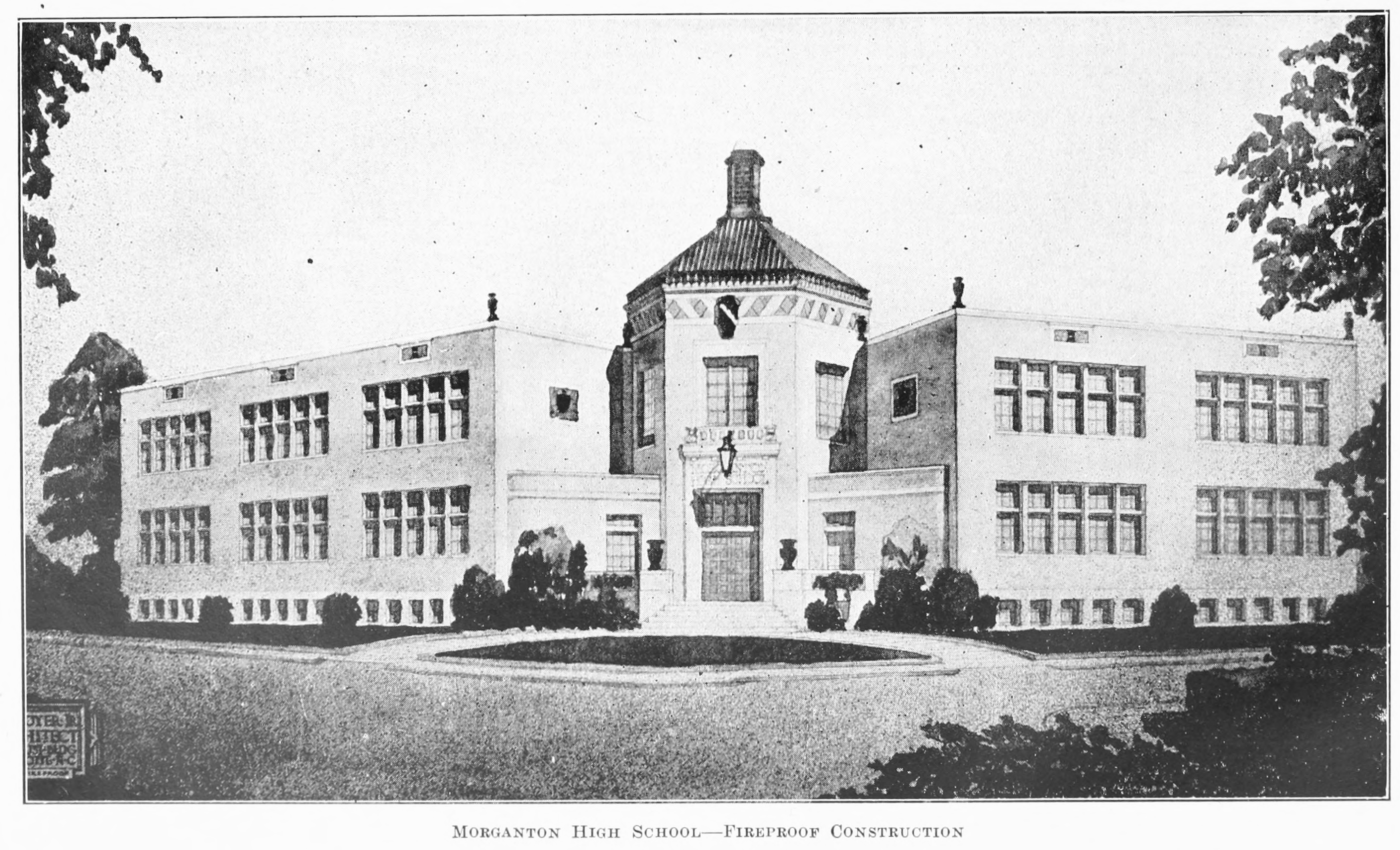
(1922) Morganton High School. Morganton, North Carolina

== The ballpark ==
The Morganton Aggies teams hosted their home minor league games at the Morganton High School Ballpark. Today, the ballpark site is still in use, as is the high school building. The high school building site currently houses the Burke County Public School Central office. The building is located at 510 South College Street in Morganton, North Carolina.

== Timeline ==
Year(s)	# Yrs.	Team	Level	League	Ballpark
1948–1952	5	Morganton Aggies	Class D	Western Carolina League	Morganton High School Park

== Year-by-year records ==
Year	Record	Finish	Manager	Playoffs/Notes
1948	54–53	3rd	Les McGarity / Homer Daugherty / Wayne Stewart / Boger McGimsey	Lost in 1st round
1949	58–49	4th	Sam Bell	Lost League Finals
1950	54–57	5th	Sam Bell / Homer Daugherty / Jim Poole	Did not qualify
1951	71–39	1st	George Bradshaw	Won league pennant Lost League Finals
1952	41–51	NA	George Bradshaw / Pete Treece	Team folded August 3

== Notable alumni ==
- George Bradshaw (1951–1952, MGR)
- Jim Poole (1950, MGR)
- Johnny Temple (1948) Cincinnati Reds Hall of Fame
- Morganton Aggies players
