= Hendersonville Skylarks =

- 1948–1949; (1904, 1948–1949); Hendersonville, North Carolina

Minor league affiliations
- Class: Independent (1904); Class D (1948–1949)
- League: Carolina Interstate League (1904); Western Carolina League (1948–1949)

Major league affiliations
- Team: None

Minor league titles
- League titles (0): None

Team data
- Name: Hendersonville (1904); Hendersonville Skylarks (1948–1949)
- Ballpark: Western North Carolina Fairgrounds (1948–1949)

The Hendersonville Skylarks were a minor league baseball team based in Hendersonville, North Carolina. Hendersonville played an initial season in the 1904 Carolina Interstate League, before the Skylarks became members of the Class D level Western Carolina League in 1948 and 1949. The Skylarks hosted home games at the Western North Carolina Fairgrounds.

Decades earlier, the Skylarks were preceded in minor league by the 1904 Hendersonville team, who played the season as members of the independent Carolina Interstate League.

== History ==
Hendersonville, North Carolina first hosted league baseball play in 1904, when the Hendersonville team played as members of the four–team Independent level Carolina Interstate League. League records for the 1904 Carolina Interstate League are unknown.

In 1948, the Hendersonville "Skylarks" became charter members of the eight–team Class D level Western Carolina League. The Forest City Owls, Lincolnton Cardinals, Marion Marauders, Morganton Aggies, Newton-Conover Twins and Shelby Farmers joined Hendersonville as charter members.

Beginning league play on April 30, 1948, the Hendersonville Skylarks finished last in the Western Carolina League regular season standings. Ending the regular season with a record of 36–70, the Skylarks placed eighth playing under manager Charlie Munday. Hendersonville finished 31.0 games behind the first place Lincolnton Cardinals in the Western Carolina League regular season standings. The Skylarks did not qualify for the four–team playoffs won by Lincolnton.

In their final season of play, the 1949 Hendersonville Skylarks again placed eighth in the Western Carolina League regular season standings. The Skylarks ended the season with a record of 29–78, playing under managers Rube Wilson and Raymond Hunt as Hendersonville finished 42.5 games behind the first place Newton-Conover Twins. Hendersonville again missed the playoffs, won by the Rutherford County Owls.

The Hendersonville Skylarks franchise permanently folded following the 1949 season, replaced by the Gastonia Browns in the 1950 Western Carolina League. Hendersonville, North Carolina has not hosted another minor league team.

== The ballpark ==
The Hendersonville Skylarks played home minor league games at the Western North Carolina Fairgrounds. It was reported the ballpark had a capacity of 5,000. The Berkeley Mills Ballpark was constructed in Hendersonville, North Carolina in 1949.

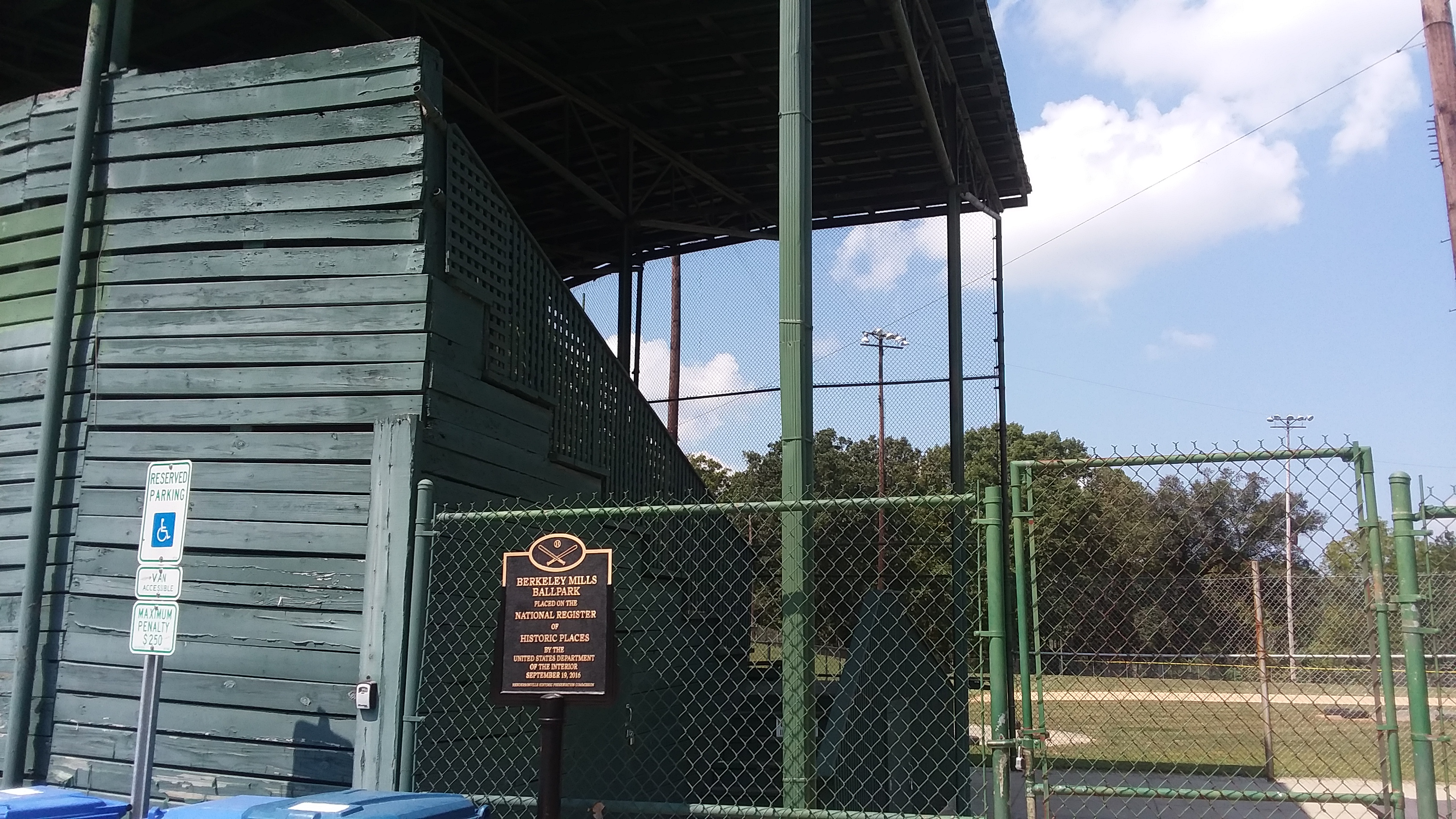
(2019) Berkeley Mills Ballpark, constructed 1949. National Register of Historic Places. Hendersonville, North Carolina

== Timeline ==
Year(s)	# Yrs.	Team	Level	League
1904	1	Hendersonville	Independent	Carolina Interstate League
1948–1949	2	Hendersonville Skylarks	Class D	Western Carolina League

== Year–by–year records ==
Year	Record	Finish	Manager	Playoffs/Notes
1904	00–00	NA	NA	League records unknown
1948	36–70	8th	Charlie Munday	Did not qualify
1949	29–78	8th	Rube Wilson / Raymond Hunt	Did not qualify

== Notable alumni ==
No alumni of the Hendersonville Skylarks reached the major leagues.
