= Kelly Jack Swift =

Kelly Jack Swift (May 6, 1920 – April 5, 1965) was a minor league pitcher from 1947 through 1958. He is noted as the last minor league pitcher to have won 30 games in one season, which he accomplished for the Marion Marauders of the Tar Heel League in 1953, when he went 30–7 with a 2.54 earned run average (ERA).

Swift was tall (6 feet 4 inches), and had lengthy, strong arms from working on the family tobacco farm throughout his youth. He was said to be able to throw his fastball over 100 miles per hour, comparable to the fastball of Hall of Famer Bob Feller. Swift played briefly in the high minor leagues, but his lack of a good curve ball coupled with inconsistent control, and the glut of minor league talent available in the post-war years, were among the factors that kept him from reaching the major leagues.

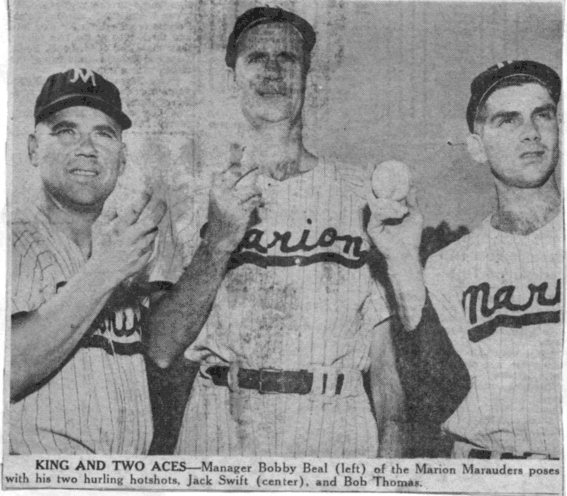
Pitcher Kelly Jack Swift of the Marion Marauders from a July 24, 1953 article in the Asheville (N.C.) Times

His 1953 season for the Marion Marauders was a statistical marvel. He was worked about every other day, finishing with 30 wins and 7 losses in his 52 appearances, with 207 innings pitched and 321 strikeouts. He had 27 starts, and was often brought in to relieve later in the games. He was the finisher in 48 of his 52 games.

Marion cruised to the league championship in what would be the Tar Heel League's final full season of play. It was also the last time a minor league pitcher would achieve 30 wins in one season.

Swift died of kidney failure caused by hypertension, on April 5, 1965, at age 44. Although most sites list his birth year as 1922, the family learned that his birth certificate indicated 1920. His death certificate, which is accessible on the website ancestry.com, also indicates 1920.

The North Carolina native is buried in a small cemetery in Mountain Park. He is a member of the Surry County Sports Hall of Fame.

Sports Illustrated published an article about Swift in its October 17, 2011, edition. The article is framed by the story of a chance discovery of a championship ring that Swift had won with the Memphis Chicks in 1956. It slipped from his finger at some point, and a scavenger with a metal detector found it, decades later.
