= Eddie Yount =

American baseball player (1915–1973)

- Outfielder
- Born: December 19, 1915; Newton, North Carolina, U.S.
- Died: October 26, 1973 (aged 57); Newton, North Carolina, U.S.
- Batted: Right Threw: Right

MLB debut
- September 9, 1937, for the Philadelphia Athletics

Last MLB appearance
- September 10, 1939, for the Pittsburgh Pirates

MLB statistics
- Batting average: .222
- Home runs: 0
- RBI: 1
- Stats at Baseball Reference

Teams
- Philadelphia Athletics (1937); Pittsburgh Pirates (1939)

Floyd Edwin Yount (December 19, 1915 – October 26, 1973) was an American professional baseball player. He played six games in two seasons in Major League Baseball, four for the Philadelphia Athletics in 1937 and two for the Pittsburgh Pirates in 1939, primarily as an outfielder. Yount enjoyed a minor league career which lasted until 1951, except for three seasons missed during World War II.
