= Buz Phillips =

American baseball player (1904-1964)

- Pitcher
- Born: May 25, 1904; Newton, North Carolina, U.S.
- Died: November 6, 1964 (aged 60); Baltimore, Maryland, U.S.
- Batted: Right Threw: Right

MLB debut
- August 5, 1930, for the Philadelphia Phillies

Last MLB appearance
- September 22, 1930, for the Philadelphia Phillies

MLB statistics
- Win–loss record: 0–0
- Earned run average: 8.04
- Strikeouts: 9
- Stats at Baseball Reference

Teams
- Philadelphia Phillies (1930)

Albert Abernathy "Buz" Phillips (May 25, 1904 – November 6, 1964) was an American Major League Baseball (MLB) pitcher who played for the Philadelphia Phillies in 1930.
