= Granite Falls Graniteers =

The Granite Falls Graniteers were a Western Carolina League baseball team based in Granite Falls, North Carolina, United States that existed for only the 1951 season. They used five different managers and won only 14 games, while losing 96. The team was the subject of a book entitled, "The Rocks: The True Story of the Worst Team in Baseball History!", as they had the worst winning percentage in baseball. During their long season, the Graniteers changed their name to "The Granite Rocks," and even tried 'Black Cat Night at Granite Falls Stadium' in hope to help turn things around. Granite's baseball team still had impactful moments, as towards the end of the season, the team signed five black players, making them the first Southern pro baseball team to break the color barrier.

== Stadium ==
The Graniteers' stadium was M.S. Deal Stadium in Granite Falls, which was then called High School Park. The stadium is still standing on what is now the campus of Granite Falls Middle School.
