= Lexington, North Carolina minor league baseball history =

Lexington, North Carolina minor league teams
- 1936–1967; (1936–1942, 1945–1953, 1960–1961, 1963–1967); Lexington, North Carolina

Minor league affiliations
- Class: Independent (1936); Class D (1937–1942, 1945–1953, 1960–1961); Class A (1963–1967)
- League: Carolina League (1936); North Carolina State League (1937–1942, 1945–1952); Tar Heel League (1953); Western Carolina League (1960–1961); Western Carolinas League (1963–1967)

Major league affiliations
- Team: Philadelphia A's (1938–1939, 1945–1952); New York Mets (1961); San Francisco Giants (1963–1966); Atlanta Braves (1967)

Minor league titles
- League titles (2): 1940; 1953
- Conference titles (1): 1950
- Wild card berths (10): 1938; 1939; 1940; 1945; 1947; 1948; 1949; 1953; 1960; 1961

Team data
- Name: Lexington Indians (1936–1942); Lexington A's (1945–1950); Lexington Indians (1951–1953, 1960–1961); Lexington Giants (1963–1966); Lexington Braves (1967)
- Ballpark: Wennonah Field (1937); Holt Moffit Field (1938–1942, 1945–1953, 1960–1961, 1963–1967)

Minor league baseball teams were based in Lexington, North Carolina between 1937 and 1967. Lexington teams played as members of the Carolina League in 1936, North Carolina State League from 1937 to 1942 and 1945 to 1952, Tar Heel League in 1953 Western Carolina League from 1960 to 1961 and Western Carolinas League from 1963 to 1967. Lexington won two league championships.

Lexington teams played as a minor league affiliate of the Philadelphia A's (1938–1939, 1945–1952), New York Mets (1961), San Francisco Giants (1963–1966) and Atlanta Braves (1967).

== History ==
Minor league baseball began in Lexington, North Carolina during the 1936 season under unique circumstances. The Rutherford County Owls began 1936 the season as charter members of the eight–team Independent level Carolina League, relocating to Lexington during the season. The Independent league was nicknamed as an "outlaw" league because of the Independent status. On July 3, 1936, the Rutherford County franchise was surrendered to the league after an attack of an umpire occurred at the Owls' home ballpark in Forest City, North Carolina. Rutherford County had a record of 21–25 under managers Maurice Frew and Baxter Moose when the franchise was surrendered. The franchise became the Lexington Indians and immediately replaced Rutherford County in league play. After compiling a 16–36 record in Lexington, the team then finished the season in 6th place with a 37–61 overall record.

According to reports of the July 3, 1936, incident, umpire C.T. Skidmore was attacked outside of Alexander Park after a game against Shelby. After the attack, Skidmore was complimentary of the players and team officials, who assisted him after the attack, including Dr. C.H. Verner who was president of the Rutherford County club and treated Skidmore's injuries. Skidmore stated he believed the attack was by out-of-town fans or gamblers. After the incident, Verner surrendered the team to the league. After a Carolina League meeting on July 5, 1936, the franchise was awarded to Lexington.

In 1937, the Lexington Indians continued play in a new league. The Indians began play as members of the reformed Class D level North Carolina State League. The North Carolina League reformed in 1937, with Lexington playing joining the Cooleemee Weavers, Landis Sens, Mooresville Moors, Newton-Conover Twins, Thomasville Chair Makers, Salisbury Bees and Shelby Cardinals in the eight–team league. Lexington became an affiliate of the Philadelphia A's in 1938 and 1939.

After being defeated in the playoffs in 1938 and 1939, the Lexington Indians captured the 1940 North Carolina State League Championship. After finishing with a 64–38 record and placing third in the regular season, Lexington defeated the first place Kannapolis Towelers 3 games to 0 in the semi–finals. In the Finals, Lexington defeated the Mooresville Moors 4 games to 1 to claim the championship.

After the North Carolina State League had a hiatus due to World War II in 1943 and 1944, the Lexington A's began play as the league reformed in 1945. Taking their moniker, Lexington also resumed as a Philadelphia A's affiliate in 1945, a relationship which lasted to 1952.The Lexington A's advanced to the North Carolina State League finals in 1945, 1947 and 1949, losing each time.

Lexington resumed using the Lexington Indians moniker in 1951. In 1953, the North Carolina State League and Western Carolina League merged, creating the ten–team Tar Heel League. The Lexington Indians finished with a 59–54 record, placing fourth in the regular season. In the playoffs, Lexington defeated the Forest City Owls 4 games to 2. In the Tar Heel League finals, the Lexington Indians defeated the Marion Marauders 4 games to 2, to win the 1953 Tar Heel League Championship. However, Lexington was one of six league teams that did not return to play in 1954.

In 1960, the Lexington Indians began play as founding members in the reformed Class D level Western Carolina League. The Indians were an affiliate of the New York Mets in 1961. Lexington finished 70–29 to finish with the league pennant in 1960, before losing in the playoffs. In 1961, the Indians advanced to the league finals before losing. The Lexington Indians folded after the 1961 season.

After not fielding a team in 1962, the Lexington Giants returned to the renamed Class A level Western Carolinas League in 1963, as an affiliate of the San Francisco Giants. The Giants would not reach the playoffs in their four seasons of play.

The Lexington Braves continued play in the Western Carolinas League in 1967, becoming an affiliate of the Atlanta Braves. The Braves finished with a record of 55–67, missing the playoffs. The franchise folded after the 1967 season.

Lexington, North Carolina has not hosted another minor league team.

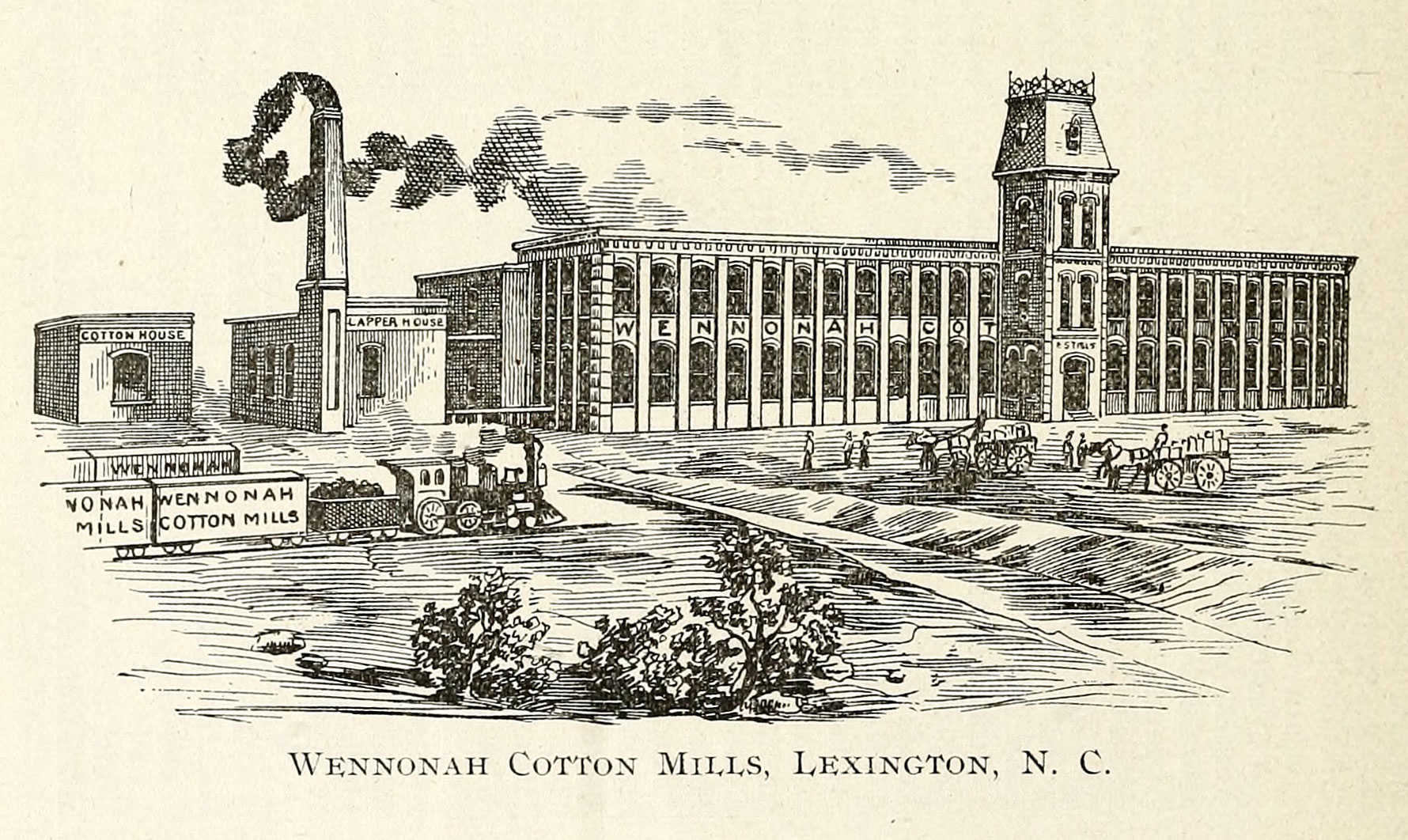
Wennonah Cotton Mills, Lexington, North Carolina

== The ballparks ==
Lexington minor teams played at Wennonah Field in 1937. For the remainder of their duration, Lexington teams were noted to have played at Holt-Moffit Field. The ballpark was called Wennonah Field in 1937 when a WPA Project was completed in time for the 1938 season. Holt-Moffit Field is still in use today, located at 101 South State Street, Lexington, North Carolina.

== Timeline ==
Year(s)	# Yrs.	Team	Level	League	Affiliate	Ballpark
1936	1	Lexington Indians	Independent	Carolina League	None	Wennonah Field
1937	1	Lexington Indians	Class D	North Carolina State League	None	Wennonah Field
1938–1939	2	Lexington Indians	Class D	North Carolina State League	Philadelphia Athletics	Holt-Moffit Field
1940–1942	3	Lexington Indians	Class D	North Carolina State League	None	Holt-Moffit Field
1945–1950	6	Lexington A's	Class D	North Carolina State League	Philadelphia Athletics	Holt-Moffit Field
1951–1952	2	Lexington Indians	Class D	North Carolina State League	Philadelphia Athletics	Holt-Moffit Field
1953	1	Lexington Indians	Class D	Tar Heel League	None	Holt-Moffit Field
1960	1	Lexington Indians	Class D	Western Carolina League	None	Holt-Moffit Field
1961	1	Lexington Indians	Class D	Western Carolina League	New York Mets	Holt-Moffit Field
1963–1966	4	Lexington Giants	Class A	Western Carolinas League	San Francisco Giants	Holt-Moffit Field
1967	1	Lexington Braves	Class A	Western Carolinas League	Atlanta Braves	Holt-Moffit Field

== Year–by–year records ==
Year	Record	Finish	Manager	Playoffs/Notes
1936	37–61	6th	Maurice Few / Baxter Moose	Rutherford County (21–25) franchise awarded to Lexington July 5 Did not qualify
1937	50–59	6th	Baxter Moose / Phil Lundeen	Did not qualify
1938	66–46	3rd	Phil Lundeen	Lost in 1st round
1939	64–46	2nd	Joe Bird / James Calleran	Lost in 1st round
1940	64–48	3rd	Reece Harris / Lester Smith	League champions
1941	47–53	6th	Lester Smith	Did not qualify
1942	55–44	5th	Buck Jordan	Did not qualify
1945	69–46	2nd	Jimmy Maus	Lost League Finals
1946	34–75	8th	Jimmy Maus	Did not qualify
1947	57–53	4th	Homer Lee Cox	Lost League Finals
1948	59–50	4th	Homer Lee Cox	Lost in 1st round
1949	60–64	4th	Archie Templeton / Walt VanGrofski	Lost League Finals
1950	49–62	6th	Homer Lee Cox	Did not qualify
1951	61–65	5th	Harold Harrigan; Gray Hampton / Robert Deese	Did not qualify
1952	30–77	6th	Robert Deese / Ducky Detweiler; Soup Campbell / Cliff Bolton	Did not qualify
1953	59–54	4th	Alex Monchak	League champions
1960	70–29	1st	Jack Hale	Lost in 1st round
1961	51–53	3rd	Jack Hale	Lost League Finals
1963	64–60	4th	Max Lanier	Did not qualify
1964	71–54	3rd	Max Lanier	Did not qualify
1965	62–54	4th	Max Lanier	Did not qualify
1966	37–86	8th	Alex Cosmidis / Denny Sommers	Did not qualify
1967	55–63	5th	Buddy Hicks	Did not qualify

== Notable alumni ==
- Chris Arnold (1966)
- Cliff Bolton (1952)
- Bobby Bonds (1965) 3x MLB All–Star; San Francisco Giants Wall of Fame
- Dick Bosman (1964) 1969 AL ERA title
- Mike Corkins (1965)
- Cesar Gutierrez (1963–1965)
- Bob Hooper (1942)
- Buck Jordan (1942)
- Max Lanier (1963–1965, MGR) 2x MLB All–Star
- Les McCrabb (1937)
- Ray Miller (1964)
- Jose Morales (1964)

=== See also ===
Lexington Giants players
Lexington Indians players
Lexington A's players
