= Western Carolina League =

- Classification: Class D (1948–1952: 1960–1962)
- Sport: Minor League Baseball
- First season: 1948
- Folded: 1962
- Replaced by: Tar Heel League; Western Carolinas League
- President: John Henry Moss (1948); Cloyd A. Hager (1949–1950); P.W. Deaton (1951); T. Earl Franklin (1952); John Henry Moss (1960–1962)
- No. of teams: 12
- Country: United States of America
- Most titles: 3 Shelby Farmers / Shelby Colonels

The original Western Carolina League was a Class D circuit in Minor League Baseball which was ideated and created by John Henry Moss.

The league ran from 1948 to 1952, then combined with the North Carolina State League to form the Tar Heel League in 1953.

The second Western Carolina League was formed as a Class-D circuit in 1960. After three years, its name was changed to become the Western Carolinas League.

== League Champions ==
=== 1948–1952 ===
- 1948 Lincolnton Cardinals
- 1949 Rutherford County Owls
- 1950 Lenoir Red Sox
- 1951 Shelby Farmers
- 1952 Shelby Farmers

=== 1960–1962 ===
- 1960 Salisbury Braves
- 1961 Shelby Colonels
- 1962 Statesville Owls

== Cities represented ==
=== 1948–1952 ===
- Forest City, NC: Forest City Owls (1948)
- Gastonia, NC: Gastonia Browns (1950)
- Granite Falls, NC: Granite Falls Graniteers (1951)
- Hendersonville, NC: Hendersonville Skylarks (1948–1949)
- Hickory, NC: Hickory Rebels (1952); moved to the Tar Heel League (1953–1954)
- Lenoir, NC: Lenoir Red Sox (1948–1951); moved from the Blue Ridge League (1946–1947)
- Lincolnton, NC: Lincolnton Cardinals (1948–1952); moved to the Tar Heel League (1953)
- Marion, NC: Marion Marauders (1948–1952); moved to the Tar Heel League (1953–1954)
- Morganton, NC: Morganton Aggies (1948–1952)
- Newton, NC and Conover, NC: Newton-Conover Twins (1948–1951)
- Shelby, NC: Shelby Farmers (1948–1952)
- Spindale, NC: Rutherford County Owls (1949–1952)

=== 1960–1962 ===
See Western Carolinas League

== Sources ==
- Holaday, Chris (2006). Professional Baseball in North Carolina: An Illustrated City-by-city History, 1901–1996. Mcfarland & Company, Inc. ISBN 978-0-78-642553-2
- Baseball Reference – Western Carolina League (Class D) Encyclopedia and History
