= Shelby Reds =

- 1977–1982; Shelby, North Carolina

Minor league affiliations
- Previous classes: Class A
- Previous leagues: South Atlantic League (1980-1982); Western Carolinas League (1977-1979); Western Carolinas League (1962-1969); Western Carolina League (1960-1962); Tar Heel League (1953-1954); Western Carolina League (1948-1952); Tri-State League (1946); Tar Heel League (1939-1940); North Carolina State League (1937-1938)

Major league affiliations
- Previous teams: New York Mets (1981-1982); Pittsburgh Pirates (1979-1980); Cincinnati Reds (1977-1978); Washington Senators (1969); Kansas City Athletics (1965); New York Yankees (1963-1964); Pittsburgh Pirates (1961); New York Giants (1954); Chicago Cubs (1946); Washington Senators (1939); St. Louis Cardinals (1937-1938)

Team data
- Previous names: Shelby Mets (1982-1983); Shelby Pirates (1980-1981); Shelby Reds (1977-1978); Shelby Senators (1969); Shelby Rebels (1965); Shelby Yankees (1964); Shelby Colonels (1960-1963); Shelby Clippers (1953-1954); Shelby Farmers (1948-1952); Shelby Cubs (1946); Shelby Colonels (1940); Shelby Nationals (1939); Shelby Cardinals (1937-1938)
- Previous parks: City Park

The Shelby Reds, was the primary name of a minor league baseball team that played in Shelby, North Carolina, between 1937 and 1982.

The Reds were a member of the Western Carolinas League, before transferring with the league to the South Atlantic League in 1980. The club was initially affiliated with the Cincinnati Reds. In 1979, the Pittsburgh Pirates became their affiliate, changing the team's name to the Shelby Pirates. The team changed affiliates again in 1981, this time to the New York Mets. As result their name changed a final time to the Shelby Mets. Among earlier teams were the Shelby Colonels, Shelby Farmers, Shelby Yankees, Shelby Rebels, Shelby Senators and Shelby Cubs.

== Notable Shelby alumni ==
- Rafael Belliard (1980)
- Bruce Berenyi (1977)
- Mike Bielecki (1980)
- George Brunet (1953)
- Mark Carreon (1982)
- Dave Coble (1948 & 1951–1952, MGR)
- Jose DeLeon (1980)
- Lenny Dykstra (1981-1982) 3 x MLB All-Star
- Wes Ferrell (1965, MGR) 2 x MLB All-Star
- Cecilio Guante (1980)
- Paul Householder (1977)
- Hal Jeffcoat (1946)
- Roger McDowell (1982)
- Eddie Milner (1977)
- Fritz Peterson (1964)
- Roy Smalley Jr. (1946)
- Gene Tenace (1965) MLB All-Star; 1974 World Series Most Valuable Player
- John Wockenfuss (1969)

== Season-by-season ==
Season	Affiliation	League	Division	Record	Pct.	Division finish	League finish	Manager	Playoffs
1977	Reds	Western Carolinas League		60–79	.432	5th		Jim Lett	
1978	Reds	Western Carolinas League		75–64	.540	2nd		Jim Lett	None held
1979	Pirates	Western Carolinas League		56–78	.418	6th		Tom Zimmer	
1980	Pirates	South Atlantic League	North	58–80	.420	4th	8th	Joe Frisina	
1981	Mets	South Atlantic League	South	59–83	.415	5th	9th	Dan Monzon	
1982	Mets	South Atlantic League	North	77–63	.550	2nd	2nd	Rich Miller	
