= Glenn Gardner =

American baseball player (1916–1964)

- Pitcher
- Born: January 25, 1916; Burnsville, North Carolina, U.S.
- Died: July 7, 1964 (aged 48); Rochester, New York, U.S.
- Batted: Right Threw: Right

MLB debut
- July 19, 1945, for the St. Louis Cardinals

Last MLB appearance
- September 29, 1945, for the St. Louis Cardinals

Career statistics
- Win–loss record: 3–1
- Earned run average: 3.29
- Strikeouts: 20
- Stats at Baseball Reference

Teams
- St. Louis Cardinals (1945)

Miles Glenn Gardner (January 25, 1916 – July 7, 1964) was an American Major League Baseball pitcher who played for the St. Louis Cardinals in 1945. The 29-year-old rookie right-hander was a native of Burnsville, North Carolina.

Gardner was one of many ballplayers who only appeared in the Major Leagues during World War II. He played quite well during his time with St. Louis. He made his major league debut in relief on July 21, 1945, against the Brooklyn Dodgers at Sportsman's Park. His first major league win came in his first start, hurling a 7–0 shutout against the Philadelphia Phillies in the second game of a home doubleheader on August 15, 1945.

Gardner's season and career totals for 17 games pitched include a 3–1 record, 4 starts, 2 complete games, 1 shutout, 4 games finished, 1 save, and an ERA of 3.29 in 54.2 innings pitched. Gardner was an all-around talented player, as he hit and fielded extremely well. At the plate, he was 7-for-21 (.333) with a walk, 2 runs batted in, and 1 run scored. On defense, he handled 10 chances flawlessly for a fielding percentage of 1.000.

Gardner died at the age of 48 in Rochester, New York.
