= Lefty Guise =

American baseball player (1908–1968)

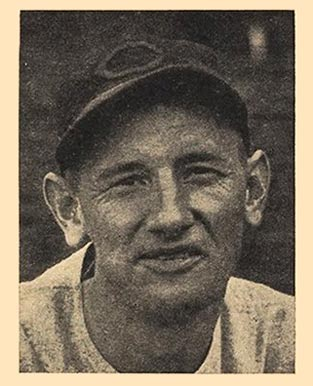
- Pitcher
- Born: September 18, 1908; Driggs, Arkansas, U.S.
- Died: August 13, 1968 (aged 59); Little Rock, Arkansas, U.S.
- Batted: Left Threw: Left

MLB debut
- September 3, 1940, for the Cincinnati Reds

Last MLB appearance
- September 13, 1940, for the Cincinnati Reds

MLB statistics
- Win–loss record: 0–0
- Earned run average: 1.17
- Strikeouts: 1
- Stats at Baseball Reference

Teams
- Cincinnati Reds (1940)

Witt Orison Guise (September 18, 1908 – August 13, 1968), nicknamed "Lefty Guise", was an American professional baseball player. He was a left-handed pitcher for one season (1940) with the Cincinnati Reds. He appeared in two major league games. In a twist of irony, he faced 20 different batters in 34 plate appearances, but he faced four future Hall of Famers, including the first two batters. The first batter to face Guise was Enos "Country" Slaughter and he struck him out which is the only strikeout that he had in his career. The next batter he faced was future Hall of Famer Johnny "The Big Cat" Mize. Later in the same game he faced future MVP Marty Marion. In his last game, he faced Mel Ott as well as Carl Hubbell. Guise got his only major league hit off Hubbell, so he accomplished a lot in very few opportunities. He did not record a decision, with a 1.17 earned run average, and one strikeout in 7 2/3 innings pitched.

An alumnus of the University of Florida, he was born in Driggs, Arkansas, and died in Little Rock, Arkansas, at the age of 59.

== See also ==
- Florida Gators
- List of Florida Gators baseball players
