= Gastonia Rockets =

- 1952–1953; Gastonia, North Carolina

Minor league affiliations
- Class: Class B (1952–1953)
- League: Tri-State League (1952–1953)

Major league affiliations
- Team: Chicago White Sox (1952–1953)

Minor league titles
- League titles (0): None
- Conference titles (1): 1952

Team data
- Name: Gastonia Rockets (1952–1953)
- Ballpark: Sims Legion Park (1952–1953)

The Gastonia Rockets were a minor league baseball team based in Gastonia, North Carolina, United States. The Rockets played as members of the Class B level Tri-State League in 1952 and 1953, winning the 1952 league pennant before the team folded following the 1953 season. The Rockets were a minor league affiliate of the Chicago White Sox and hosted home games at Sims Legion Park, which is still in use today.

== History ==
Gastonia first hosted minor league baseball in 1923, when the Gastonia "Comers" played a partial season as members of the Class B level South Atlantic League. The Gastonia Rockets were immediately preceded in minor league play by the 1950 Gastonia "Browns," who played the season as members of the Class D level Western Carolina League, finishing last in the league standings with a record of 40-70.

In 1952, Gastonia resumed minor league play as a minor league affiliate of the Chicago White Sox, when the "Rockets" became members of the eight-team Class B level Tri-State League. Gastonia replaced the Greenwood Tigers franchise in joining the league. The Anderson Rebels, Asheville Tourists, Charlotte Hornets, Greenville Spinners, Knoxville Smokies, Rock Hill Chiefs and Spartanburg Peaches joined Gastonia in beginning league play on April 16, 1952.

The "Rockets" moniker corresponds to aviation history in Gastonia. In 1946, the Gastonia Airport was opened.

In their first season of league play, the Gastonia Rockets won the 1952 Tri-State League pennant. The Rockets ended the Tri-State League regular season with a record of 89-50, finishing first in the standings, 1½ games ahead of the second place Charlotte Hornets. Hal Van Pelt served as the Gastonia manager. In the first round of the four-team playoffs, the Spartanburg Peaches defeated the Rockets 3 games to 2. Alex Cosmidis of Gastonia scored 122 runs to lead the Tri-state league in that category.

The Rockets continued play as the 1953 Tri-State League reduced to six teams, in what proved to be the final season of the team. Gastonia did not qualify for the 1953 playoffs, as the Rockets placed fifth in the Tri-State League regular season standings with a 66–81 record. With Hal Van Pelt returning as manager, the Rockets ended the season 28½ behind the first place Spartanburg Peaches. Gastonia was replaced by the Knoxville Smokies in the 1954 Tri-State League, after Knoxville had disbanded in 1953.

Gastonia, North Carolina next hosted minor league baseball in 1959, when the Gastonia Pirates played a partial season as members of the Class A level South Atlantic League.

== The ballpark ==
In their two seasons of play, the Gastonia Rockets hosted minor league home games at Sims Legion Park. The original ballpark was built in 1950, with a major renovation in 1977 and again in 2021. Still in use today, the ballpark is located at 1001 North Marietta Street.

== Timeline ==
Year(s)	# Yrs.	Team	Level	League	Affiliate	Ballpark
1952–1953	2	Gastonia Rockets	Class B	Tri-State League	Chicago White Sox	Sims Legion Park

== Year–by–year records ==
Year	Record	Finish	Manager	Attend	Playoffs / Notes
1952	89–50	1st	Hal Van Pelt	94,788	Lost in 1st round
1953	66–81	5th	Hal Van Pelt	69,052	Did not qualify

== Notable alumni ==
- Alex Cosmidis (1952)
- Zeb Eaton (1952)
- Mike Garbark (1953)
- Rudy Hernandez (1953)
- Howie Moss (1952)

== See also ==
- Gastonia Rockets players
