= Jim Poole (first baseman) =

American baseball player (1895-1975)

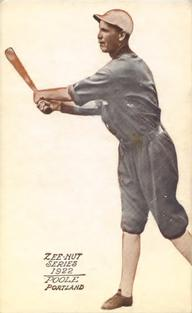
- First baseman
- Born: May 12, 1895; Taylorsville, North Carolina, U.S.
- Died: January 2, 1975 (aged 79); Hickory, North Carolina, U.S.
- Batted: Left Threw: Right

MLB debut
- April 14, 1925, for the Philadelphia Athletics

Last MLB appearance
- August 22, 1927, for the Philadelphia Athletics

MLB statistics
- Batting average: .288
- Home runs: 13
- Runs batted in: 141
- Stats at Baseball Reference

Teams
- Philadelphia Athletics (1925–1927)

James Ralph Poole (May 12, 1895 – January 2, 1975) nicknamed "Easy", was an American Major League Baseball infielder. He played for the Philadelphia Athletics from 1925 to 1927.

In a three year major league career spanning 283 games, Poole posted a .288 batting average (271-for-940) with 118 runs, 54 doubles, 13 triples, 13 home runs and 141 RBI. He recorded a .987 fielding percentage as a first baseman.
