= Tar Heel League =

- Formerly: North Carolina State League
- Classification: Class D (1939–1940, 1953–1954)
- Sport: Minor League Baseball
- First season: 1939
- Folded: 1954
- President: M. C. Campbell (1939–1940); Walter H. Woodson, Jr. (1953); Lawson Brown (1954)
- No. of teams: 13
- Country: United States of America
- Most titles: 1 Gastonia Cardinals (1939); Statesville Owls (1940); Lexington Indians (1953); Hickory Rebels (1954)
- Related competitions: Western Carolina League

The Tar Heel League was a mid-20th century Class D level professional minor baseball league, based in North Carolina in the United States. It operated during the full seasons of 1939, 1940 and 1953, and from the opening of the season through June 21, 1954.

The first incarnation of the league began and ended the 1939 season with six clubs, but the following year saw the Shelby Nationals and Newton-Conover Twins — one third of the Tar Heel League — drop out on July 19, 1940. The entire league then shut down for 1941 and through World War II.

During the postwar boom in minor league baseball, the Tar Heel circuit remained dormant, while the Class D level North Carolina State League resumed play in 1945 and a new Class D circuit, the Western Carolina League, entered organized baseball in 1948. When the 1950s brought dwindling attendance to minor league baseball and clubs and leagues began to contract, the North Carolina State and Western Carolina leagues merged into a revived Tar Heel League for 1953. A large, ten–club circuit, the 1953 THL shed two teams on June 11 and relocated a third. The 1954 Tar Heel League fielded four teams, before permanently folding 50 games into the season. The Western Carolina League returned to baseball in 1960, and still plays as the Class A level South Atlantic League.

== Cities represented ==
- Forest City, NC: Forest City Owls 1953–1954
- Gastonia, NC: Gastonia Cardinals 1939–1940
- Hickory, NC: Hickory Rebels 1939–1940, 1953–1954
- High Point, NC & Thomasville, NC: High Point-Thomasville Hi-Toms 1953
- Lenoir, NC: Lenoir Indians 1939; Lenoir Reds 1940
- Lexington, NC: Lexington Indians 1953
- Lincolnton, NC: Lincolnton Cardinals 1953
- Marion, NC: Marion Marauders 1953–1954
- Mooresville, NC: Mooresville Moors 1953
- Newton, NC & Conover, NC: Newton-Conover Twins 1939–1940
- Salisbury, NC: Salisbury Rocots 1953
- Shelby, NC: Shelby Nationals 1939; Shelby Colonels 1940; Shelby Clippers 1953–1954
- Statesville, NC: Statesville Owls 1939–1940; Statesville Blues 1953; Statesville Sports 1953

== Yearly standings & statistics ==
=== 1939 Tar Heel League ===
1939 Tar Heel League Teams

Team name	W	L	PCT	GB	Managers
Gastonia Cardinals	72	36	.667	--	Al Unser
Lenoir Indians	61	46	.570	10½	Clarence Roper
Statesville Owls	56	51	.523	15½	Stuffy McCrone
Shelby Nationals	50	59	.459	22½	Edward Montague
Hickory Rebels	48	62	.436	25	Louis Viau
Newton-Conover Twins	36	69	.343	34½	Mack Arnette

Playoffs: Gastonia 3 games, Shelby 1.
Statesville 3 games, Lenoir 0. (1 tie.) Finals: Gastonia 4 games, Statesville 3.

Player statistics

Player	Team	Stat	Tot	Player	Team	Stat	Tot
Hooper Triplett	Gastonia	BA	.391	Ralph Fox	Newton/Conover	W	17
James Guinn	Shelby	Hits	161	Miles Gardner	Gastonia	W	17
Birch Douglas	Lenoir	Runs	127	Lefty Guise	Lenoir	ERA	2.82
Hooper Triplett	Gastonia	RBI	115	William Skinner	Hickory	SO	212
Hooper Triplett	Gastonia	HR	27	Miles Gardner	Gastonia	PCT	.773 17–5

=== 1940 Tar Heel League ===
1940 Tar Heel League Teams

schedule

Team name	W	L	PCT	GB	Managers
Statesville Owls	73	37	.664	--	Stuffy McCrone
Gastonia Cardinals	64	44	.593	8	Milt Bocek
Hickory Rebels	54	52	.509	17	Woodrow Traylor
Lenoir Reds	53	55	.491	19	Ray Rice
Newton-Conover Twins	27	45	.375	NA	Arthur Hauger / Ginger Watts
Shelby Colonels	16	54	.229	NA	Lou Haneles / Art Patchin

Newton-Conover and Shelby disbanded July 19.
Playoffs: Hickory 3 games, Gastonia 0. Statesville 3 games, Lenoir 2.
Finals: Statesville 4 games, Hickory 1.
Player statistics

Player	Team	Stat	Tot	Player	Team	Stat	Tot
Milt Bocek	Gastonia	BA	.364	Herman Drefs	Statesville	W	17
Milt Bocek	Gastonia	Hits	157	Frank Motley	Newton-Conover	SO	174
Milt Bocek	Gastonia	Runs	98	Robert Bailey	Lenoir	ERA	1.99
Milt Bocek	Gastonia	RBI	109	Price Ferguson	Statesville	PCT	.824 14–3
Frank Shoue	Lenoir	HR	16				
Robert Traylor	Hickory	HR	16				

=== 1953 Tar Heel League ===
1953 Tar Heel League Teams

schedule

Team name	W	L	PCT	GB	Attend	Managers
Marion Marauders	74	35	.679	--	35,322	Bob Beal
Forest City Owls	72	40	.643	3½	48,812	Len Cross / Boger McGimsey
Shelby Clippers	60	49	.550	14	19,247	David Coble
Mooresville Moors	58	55	.513	18	19,413	Jim Mills
Lincolnton Cardinals / Statesville Sports	47	64	.423	28	27,866	Burl Storie / Hugh Rudisill / Jr. Dodgin/ Charley Knight
Hickory Rebels	46	66	.411	29½	22,742	William Parker
Salisbury Rocots	44	67	.396	31	21,690	Sheriff Robinson
High Point-Thomasville Hi-Toms	13	28	.317	NA	5,862	Jim Gruzdis / John Lybrand
Statesville Blues	13	28	.317	NA	20,925	Fred Chapman / Charley Knight

High-Point-Thomasville & Statesville disbanded June 11.
Lincolnton moved to Statesville July 12.
Playoffs: Marion 4 games, Shelby 2. Lexington 4 games, Forest City 2.
Finals: Lexington 4 games, Marion 2.

Player statistics

Player	Team	Stat	Tot	Player	Team	Stat	Tot
Don Stafford	Hi-Toms/Lexington	BA	.374	Kelly Jack Swift	Marion	W	30
Bob Barker	Marion	Hits	166	Kelly Jack Swift	Marion	SO	321
Carl Miller	Marion	Runs	129	Jose Nakamura	Shelby	ERA	2.40
Don Stafford	Hi-Toms/Lexington	RBI	124	Jim Smiley	Marion	PCT	.857 12–2
Carl Miller	Marion	HR	21				

=== 1954 Tar Heel League ===
1954 Tar Heel League Teams

schedule

Team name	W	L	PCT	GB	Attend	Managers
Hickory Rebels	34	18	.654	--	8,598	Charlie Teague
Marion Marauders	26	26	.500	8	8,203	Robert Knoke
Forest City Owls	24	24	.500	8	8,147	Woody Rich / Richard McKeithan
Shelby Clippers	16	32	.333	16	12,000	Harold Kollar

The League disbanded June 21.

Player statistics

Player	Team	Stat	Tot	Player	Team	Stat	Tot
Mike Yaremchuk	Hickory	BA	.376	Russell Wingo	Hickory	W	11
Mike Yaremchuk	Hickory	Hits	74	John Cathey	Forest City	SO	95
Mike Yaremchuk	Hickory	RBI	45	Leo Davis	Hickory	ERA	1.82
Lou McCotter	Hickory	Runs	52	Russell Wingo	Hickory	PCT	.733 11–4
Joe Cristello	Forest City	HR	5				
Harold Kollar	Shelby	HR	5				
