= Shelby Colonels =

- (1940, 1960–1963); Shelby, North Carolina

Minor league affiliations
- Class: Class A (1963); Class D (1940, 1960–1962)
- League: Western Carolinas League (1963); Western Carolina League (1960–1962); Tar Heel League (1940)

Major league affiliations
- Team: New York Yankees (1963); Pittsburgh Pirates (1961); Washington Senators (1940)

Minor league titles
- League titles (1): 1961

Team data
- Name: Shelby Colonels

The Shelby Colonels were a Tar Heel League (1940), Western Carolina League (1960–1962) and Western Carolinas League (1963) baseball team based in Shelby, North Carolina. They were affiliated with the Washington Senators in 1940, the Pittsburgh Pirates in 1961 and the New York Yankees in 1963.

Under managers Aaron Robinson and James Adlam, they won the league championship in 1961, despite posting a losing record during the regular season.
