= Lincolnton Cardinals =

The Lincolnton Cardinals of Lincolnton, North Carolina, United States were a minor league baseball team. They began play when the Western Carolina League was formed in 1948. They won the league's first title that season. In 1953, they joined the Tar Heel League and played one season there.

- Location: Lincolnton, NC
- League: Western Carolina League 1948-1952; Tar Heel League 1953
- Affiliation: none
- Ballpark: Love Field

== Year–by–year records ==
Year	Record	Finish	Manager	Playoffs / Notes
1948	69–41	1st	Fred Withers / Russell "Red" Mincy	League champions
1949	69–41	2nd	Carl Miller	Lost in 1st round
1950	49–61	6th	Hugh Rudisill / Nathaniel Dodgin	Did not qualify
1951	67–45	3rd	Bob Beal	Lost in 1st round
1952	72–39	1st	Bob Beal	Lost League Finals
1953	47–64*	6th*	Burl Storie / Hugh Rudisill / Junior Dodgin / Charley Knight	*Team moved to Statesville July 12
