= List of South Atlantic League stadiums =

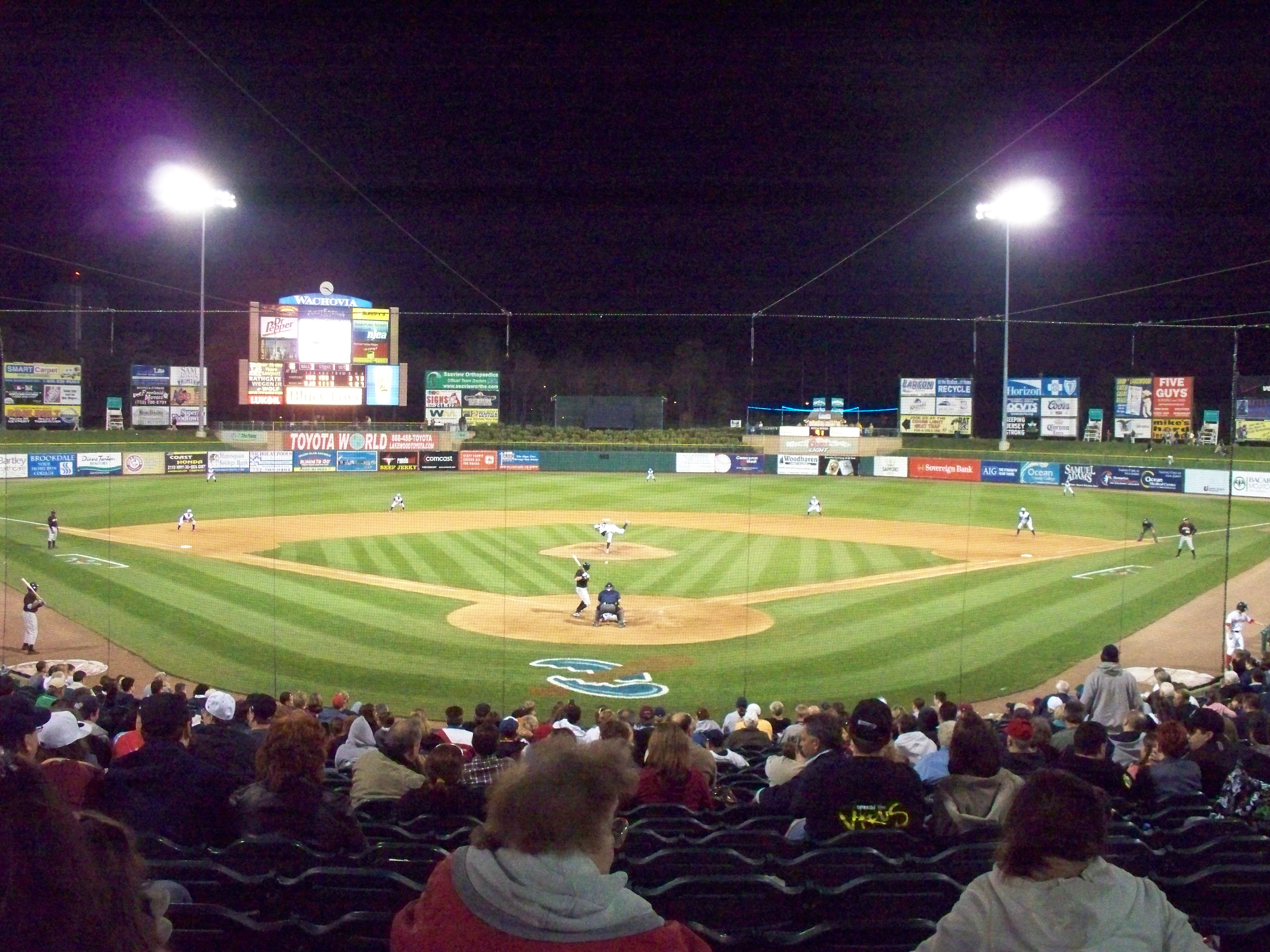
ShoreTown Ballpark was built in 2001 and is home to the Jersey Shore BlueClaws.

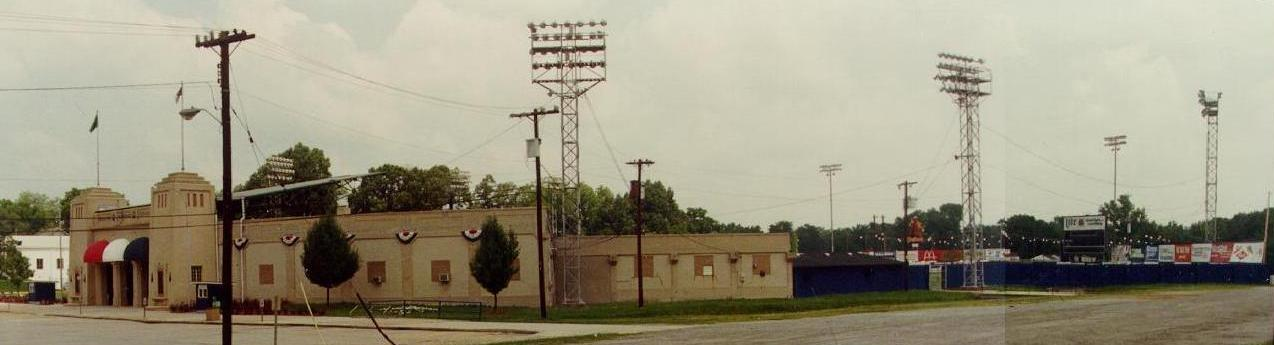
World War Memorial Stadium was built in 1926 and was home to the Greensboro Hornets, Bats, and Grasshoppers.

There are twelve stadiums in use by South Atlantic League (SAL) baseball teams. The oldest stadium is HomeTrust Park (1924) in Asheville, North Carolina, home of the Asheville Tourists. The newest stadium is Fifth Third Park in Spartanburg, South Carolina, home of the Hub City Spartanburgers. One stadium was built in the 1920s, three in the 1990s, six in the 2000s, and one in each of the 2010s and 2020s. The highest seating capacity is 8,000 at ShoreTown Ballpark in Lakewood, New Jersey, where the Jersey Shore BlueClaws play. The lowest capacity is 4,000 at HomeTrust Park.

Since its founding in 1960, there have been over 50 stadiums located among over 40 municipalities used by the league, including the periods when it was known as the Western Carolina League (1960–1962) and Western Carolinas League (1963–1979). Of the stadiums with known opening dates, HomeTrust Park (then called Old McCormick Field) and Fifth Third Park are also the oldest and newest, respectively, among all SAL stadiums. The highest known seating capacity is 9,077 at Spirit Communications Park (since renamed Prisma Health Park) in Columbia, South Carolina, home of the now-Carolina League's Columbia Fireflies. The stadium with the lowest known capacity was Walter Bickett Stadium in Monroe, North Carolina, home of the Monroe Indians and Monroe Pirates, which seated only 1,500.

== Active stadiums ==
Name	Team	City	State	Opened	Capacity	Ref.
Nymeo Field at Harry Grove Stadium	Frederick Keys	Frederick	Maryland	1990	5,400	
Maimonides Park	Brooklyn Cyclones	Brooklyn	New York	2001	7,000	
Heritage Financial Park	Hudson Valley Renegades	Wappingers Falls	New York	1994	5,400	
ShoreTown Ballpark	Jersey Shore BlueClaws	Lakewood	New Jersey	2001	8,000	
Daniel S. Frawley Stadium	Wilmington Blue Rocks	Wilmington	Delaware	1993	6,404	
HomeTrust Park	Asheville Tourists	Asheville	North Carolina	1924	4,000	
Bowling Green Ballpark	Bowling Green Hot Rods	Bowling Green	Kentucky	2009	4,559	
First National Bank Field	Greensboro Grasshoppers	Greensboro	North Carolina	2005	7,499	
Fluor Field at the West End	Greenville Drive	Greenville	South Carolina	2006	5,700	
Fifth Third Park	Hub City Spartanburgers	Spartanburg	South Carolina	2025	5,000	
AdventHealth Stadium	Rome Emperors	Rome	Georgia	2003	5,105	
Truist Stadium	Winston-Salem Dash	Winston-Salem	North Carolina	2010	5,500	

=== Map ===
Current stadium locations:
- North Division
- South Division

=== Gallery ===
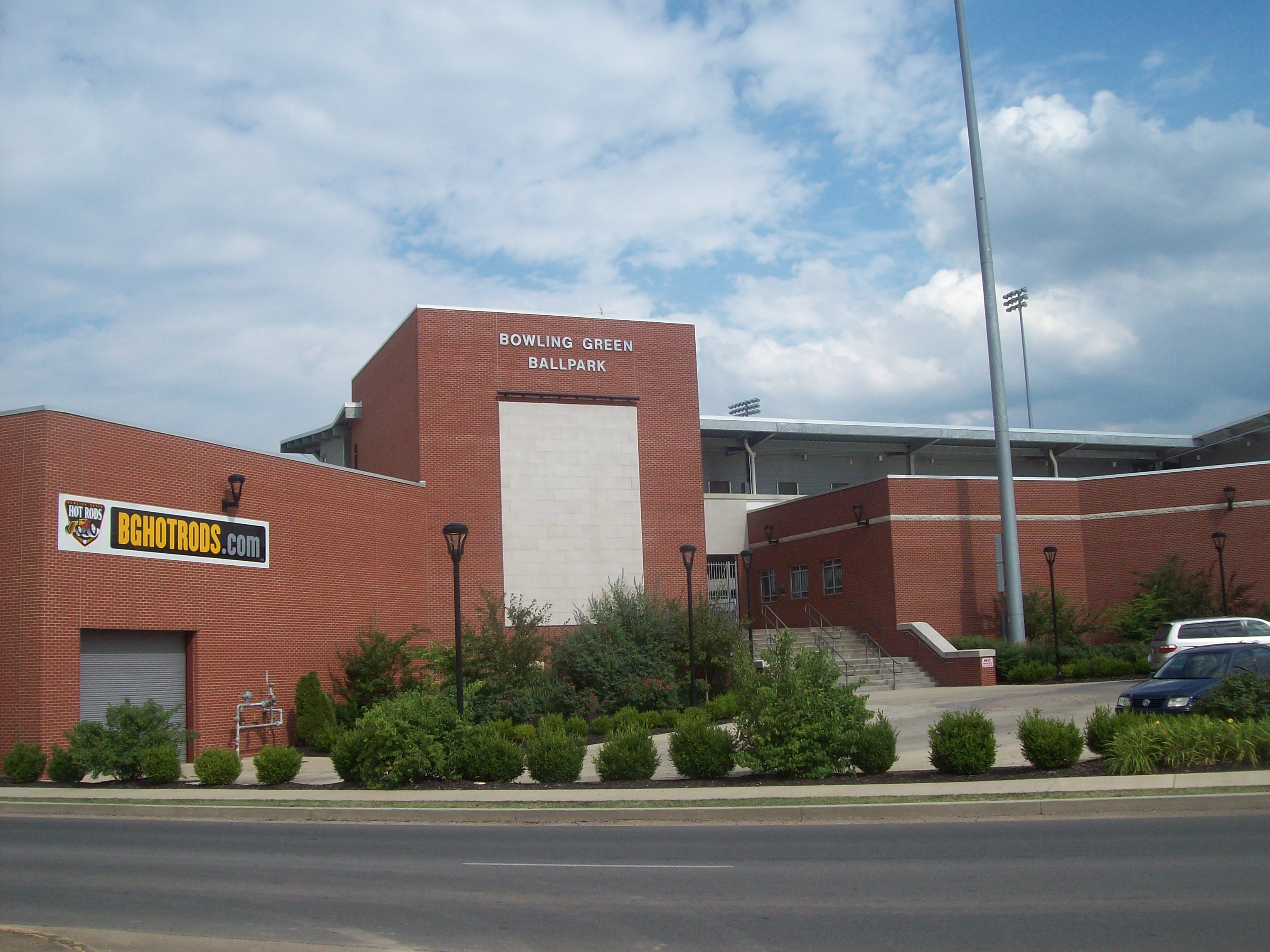
Bowling Green Ballpark (Bowling Green Hot Rods)

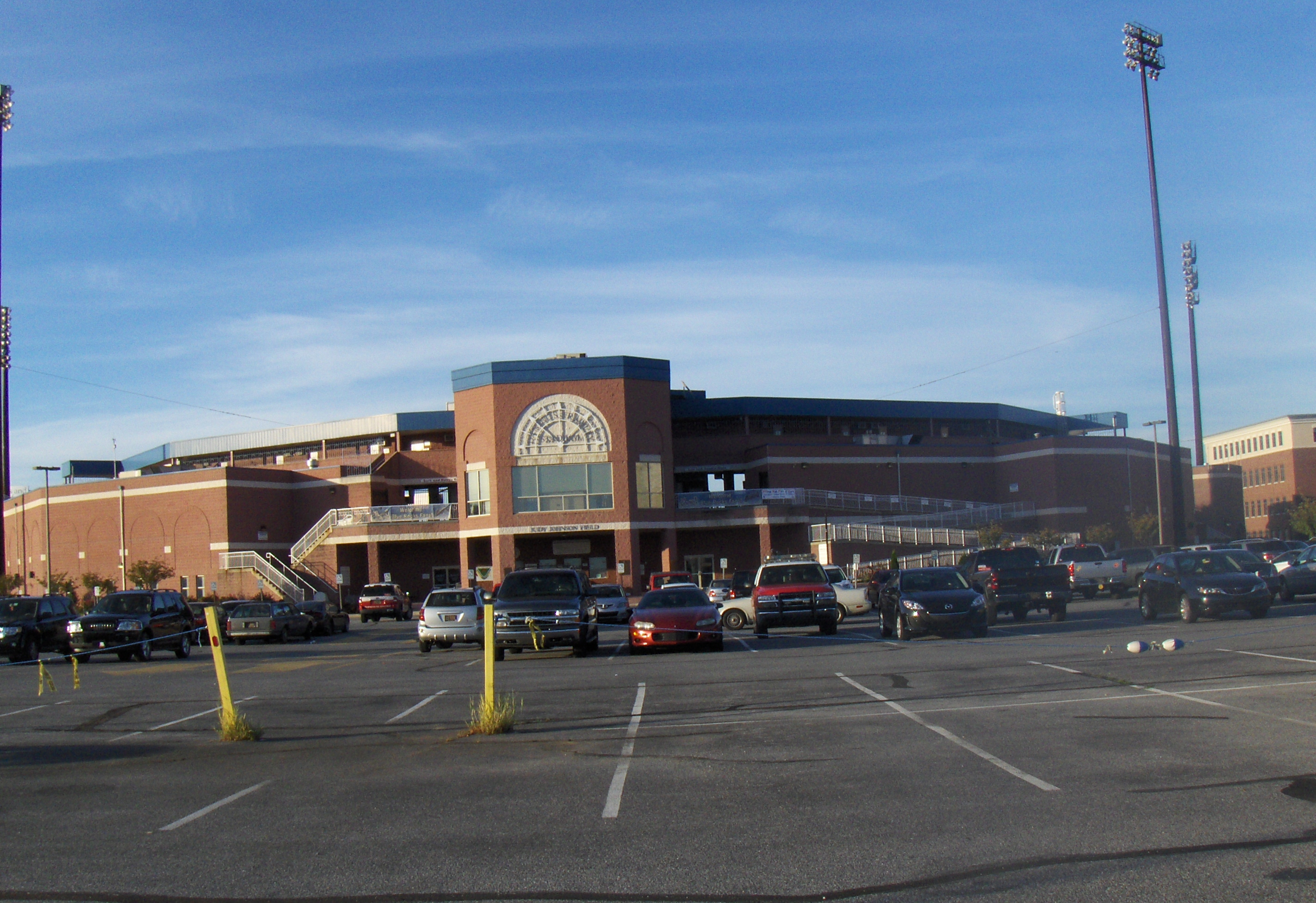
Daniel S. Frawley Stadium (Wilmington Blue Rocks)

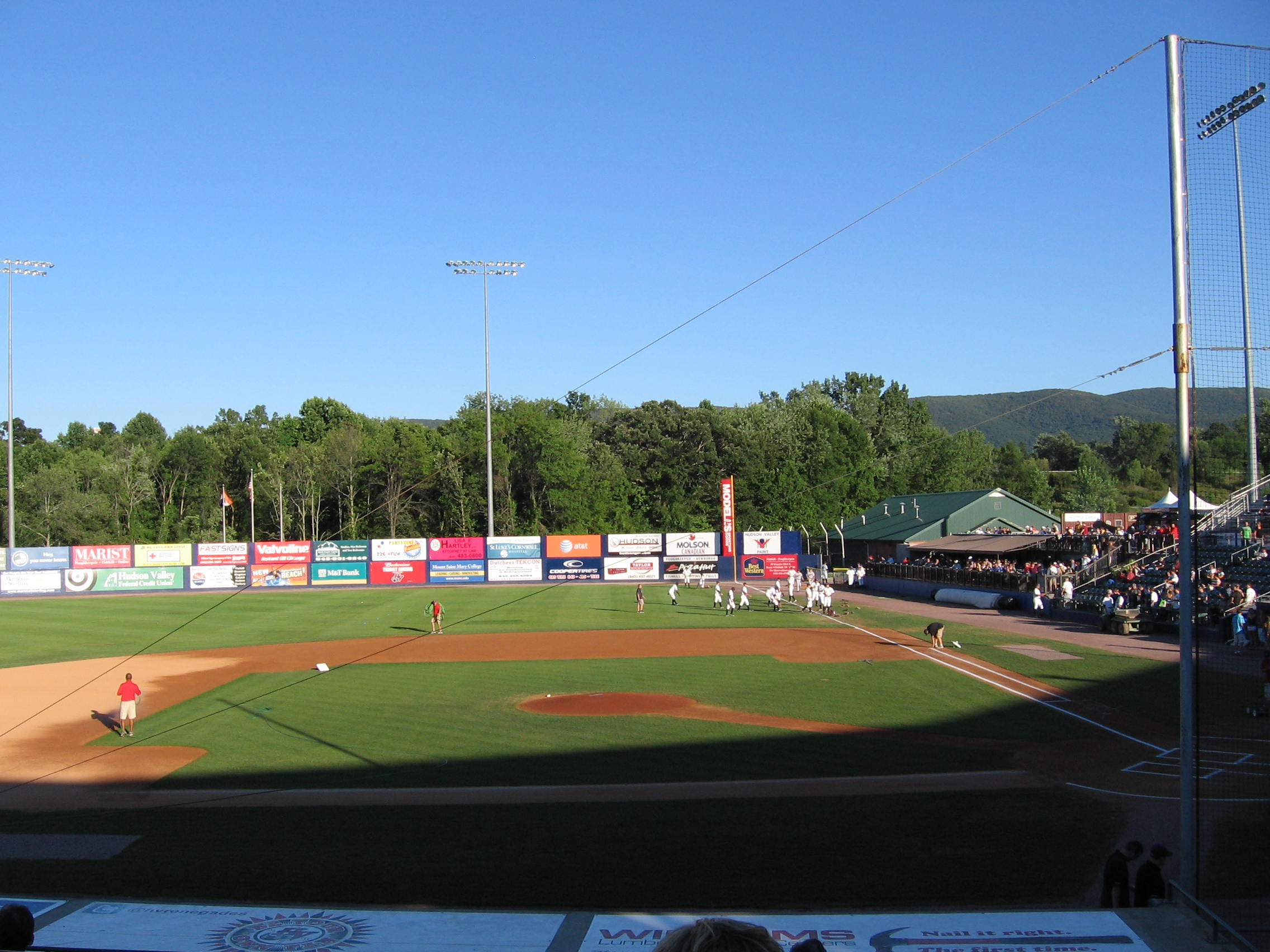
Heritage Financial Park (Hudson Valley Renegades)

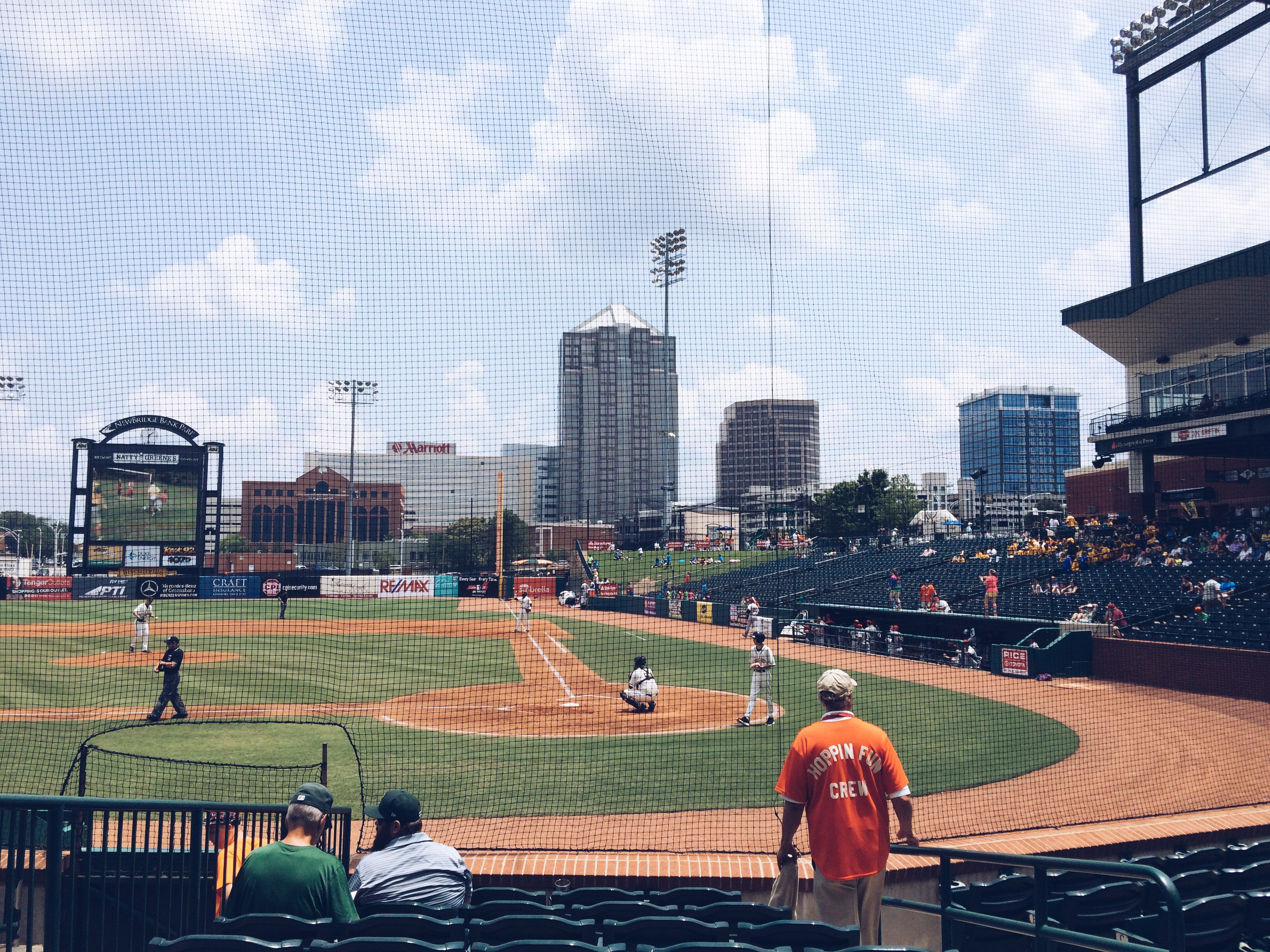
First National Bank Field (Greensboro Grasshoppers)

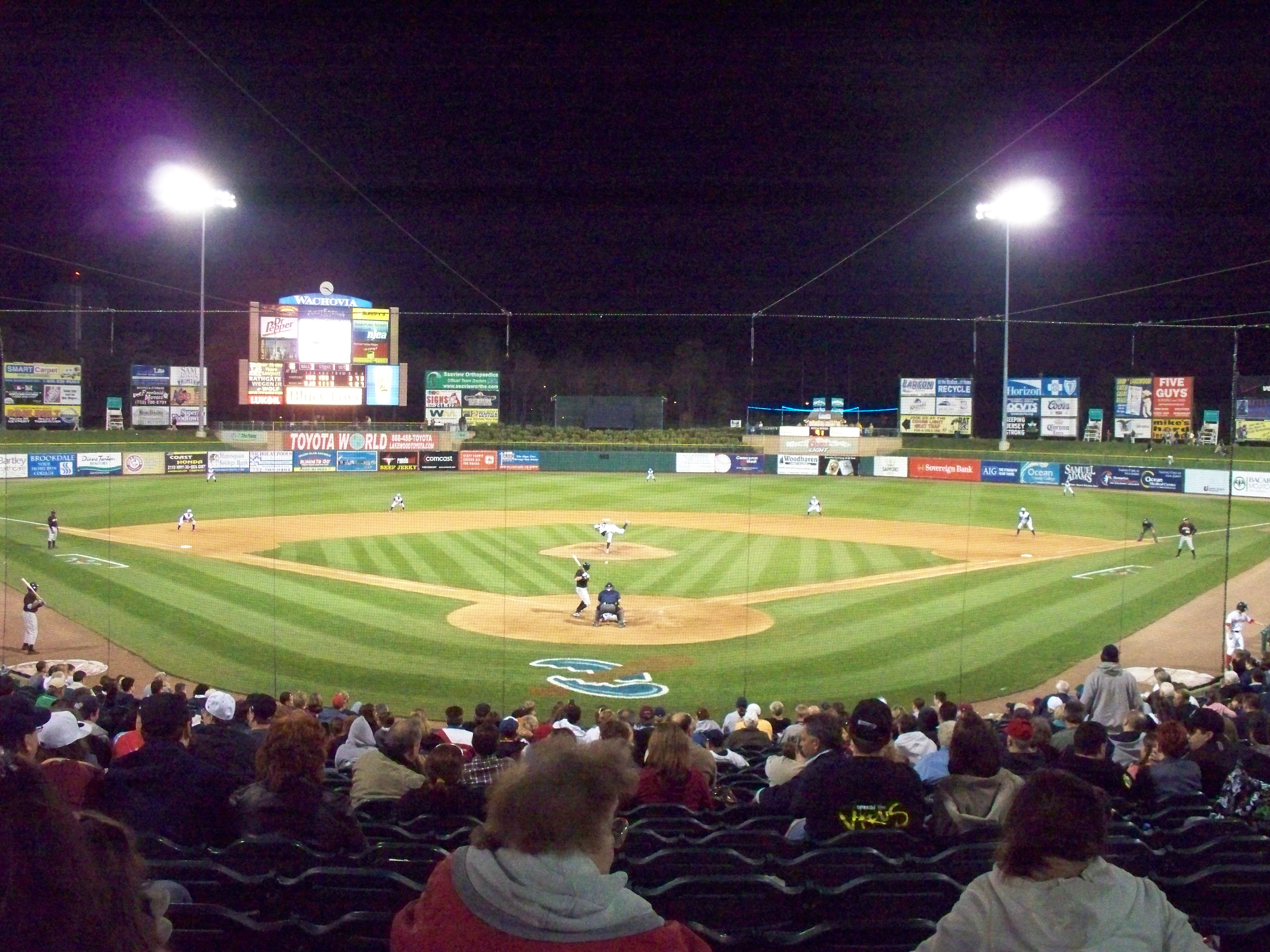
ShoreTown Ballpark (Jersey Shore BlueClaws)

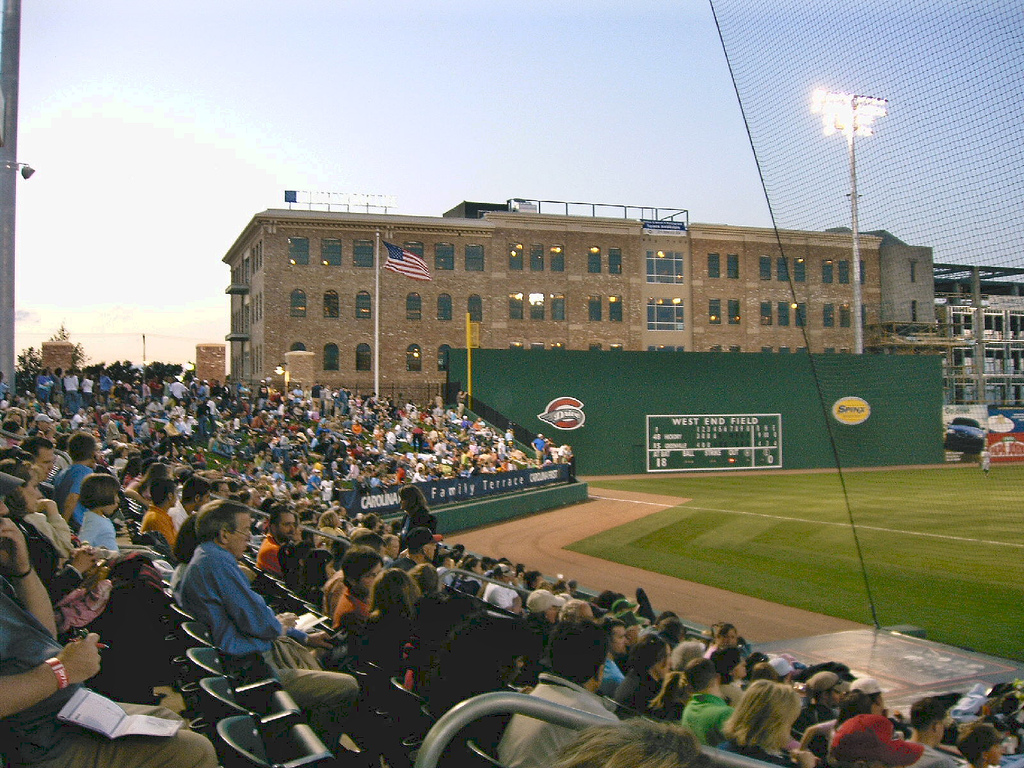
Fluor Field at the West End (Greenville Drive)

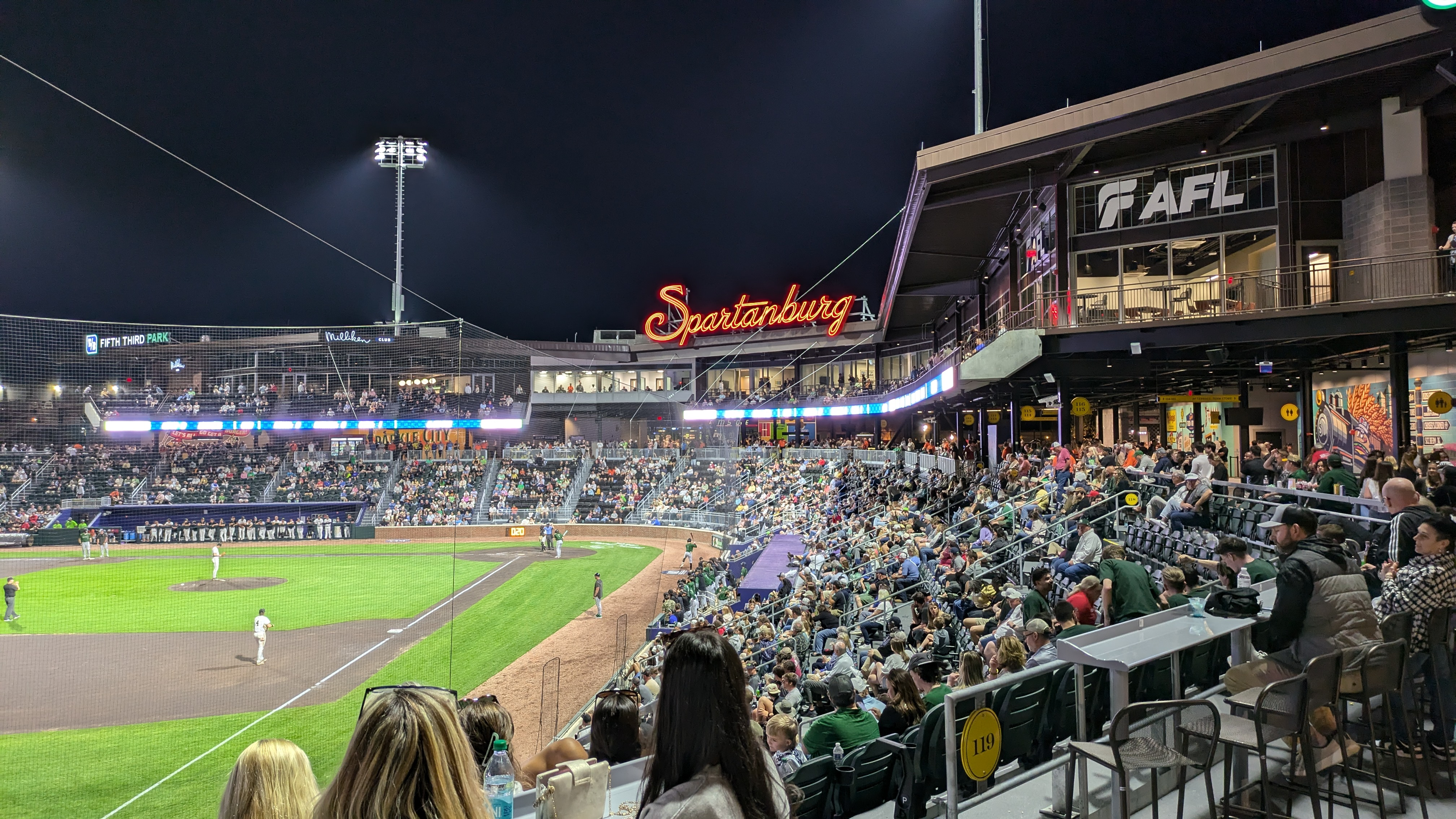
Fifth Third Park (Hub City Spartanburgers)

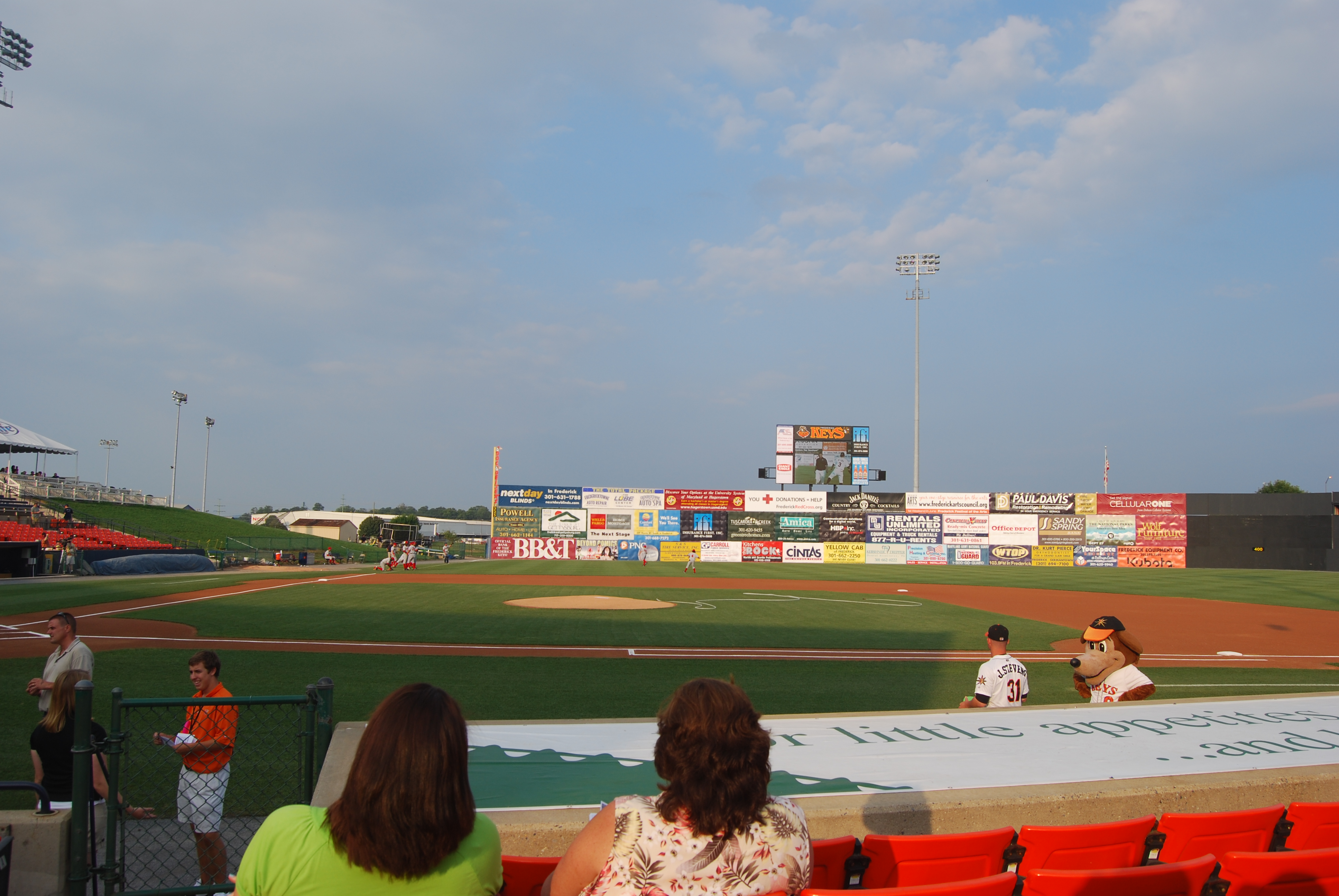
Harry Grove Stadium (Frederick Keys)

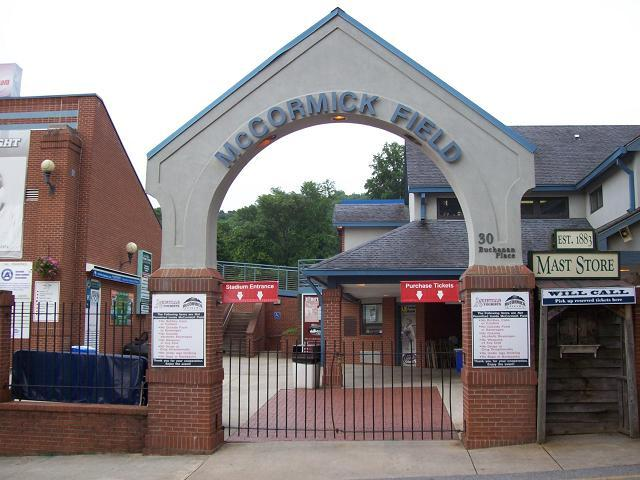
HomeTrust Park (Asheville Tourists)

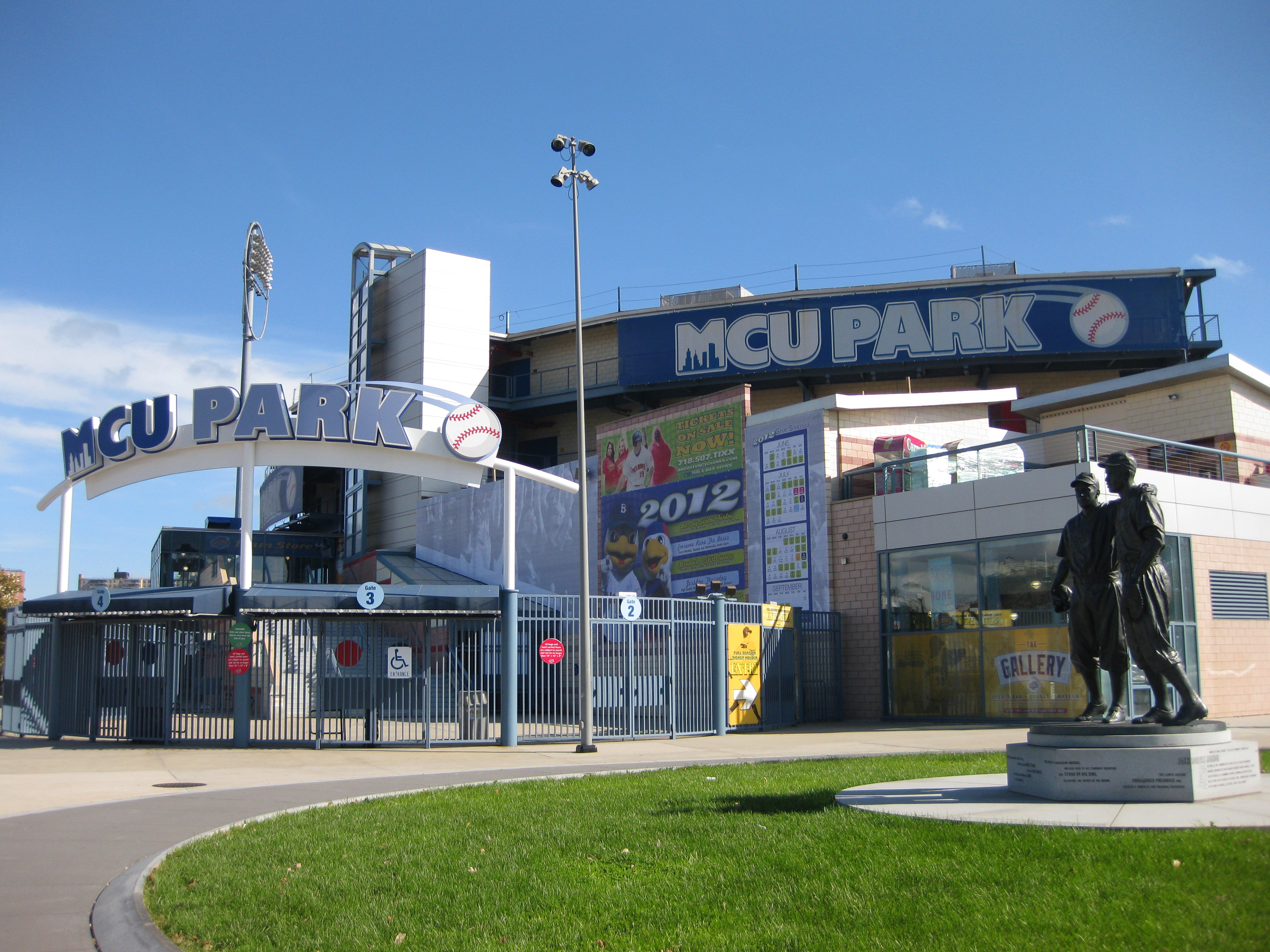
Maimonides Park (Brooklyn Cyclones)

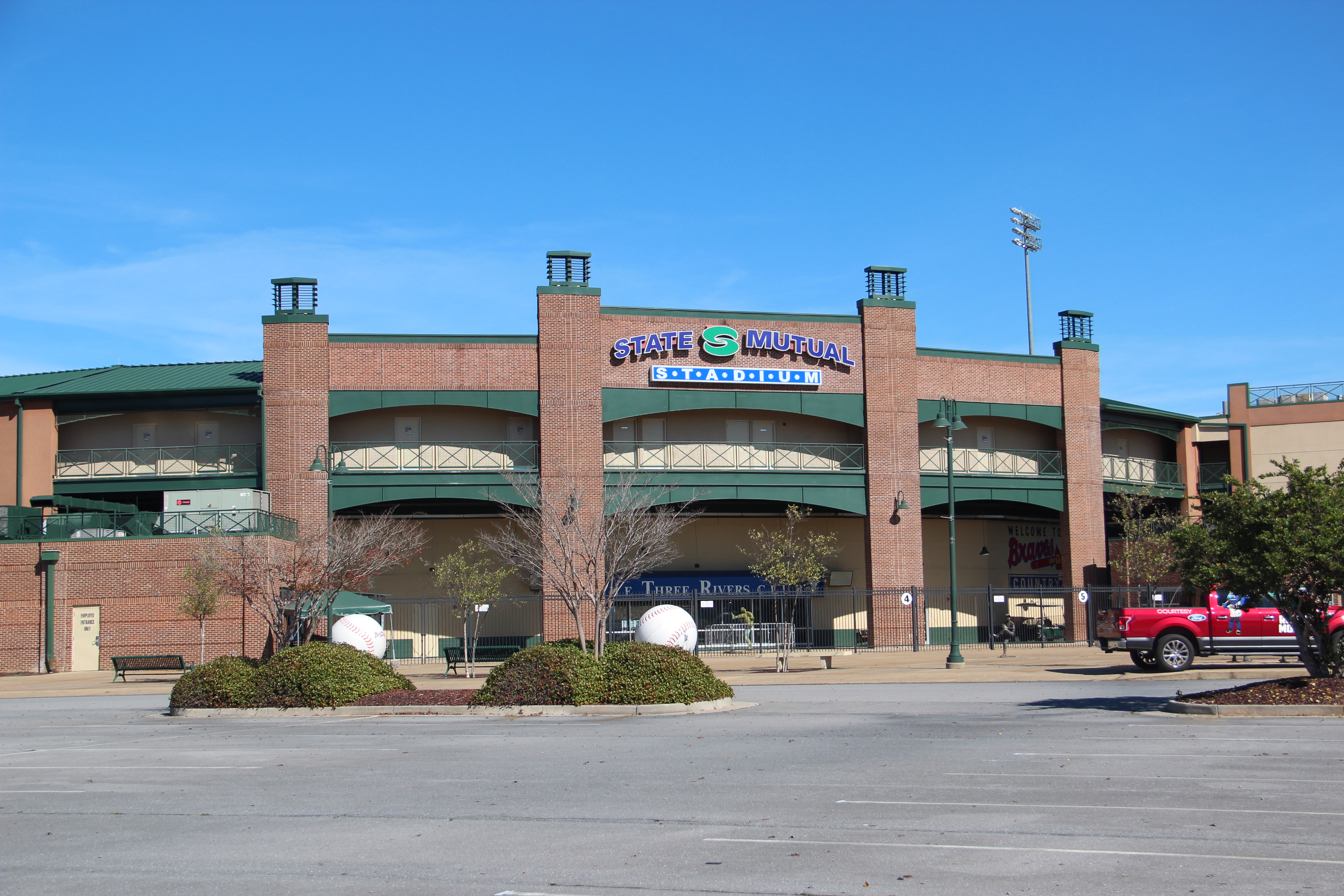
AdventHealth Stadium (Rome Emperors)

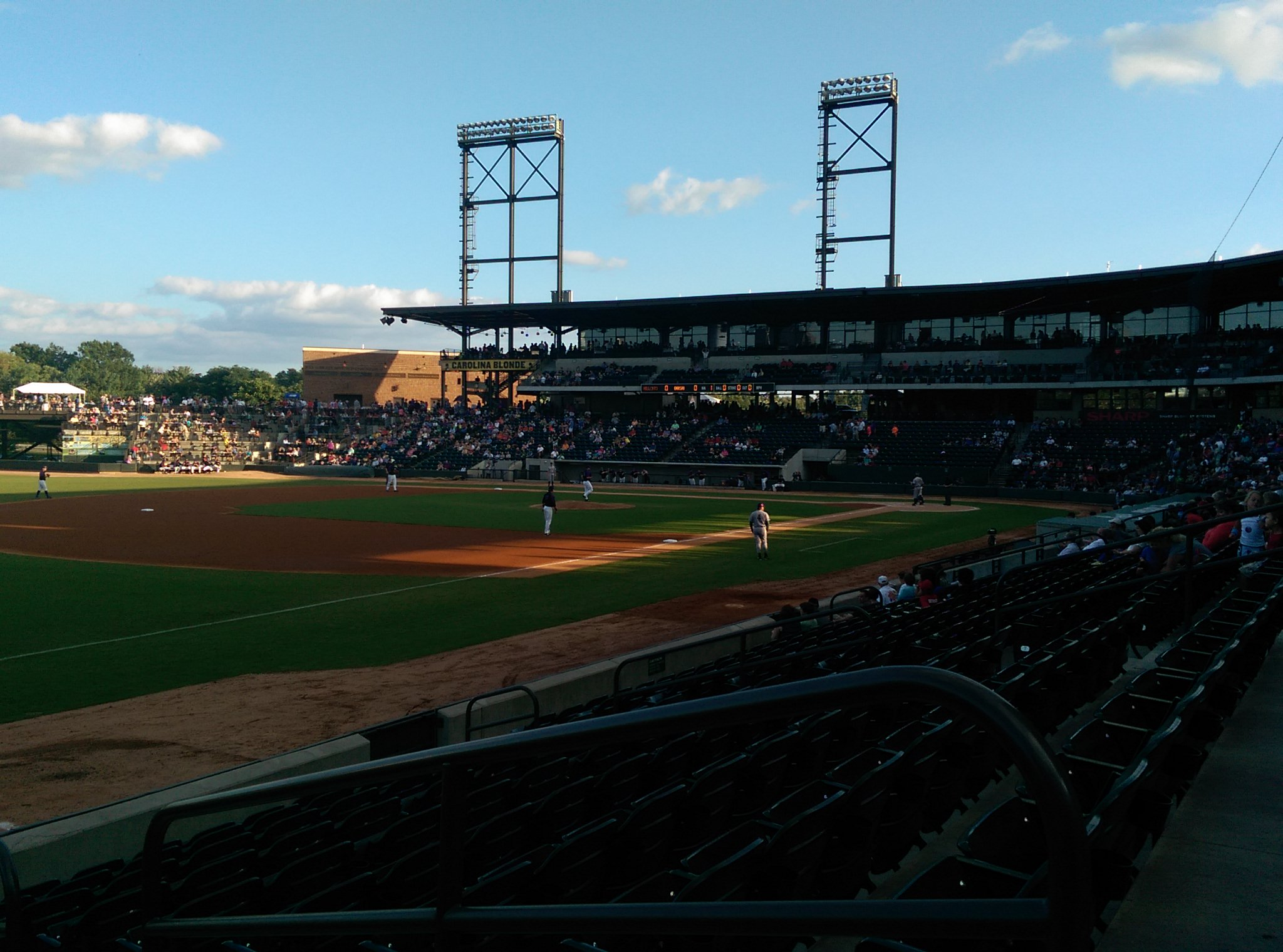
Truist Stadium (Winston-Salem Dash)

== All stadiums ==
Key
Name	Stadium's name in its last season of hosting SAL baseball
Opened	Opening of earliest stadium variant used for hosting SAL baseball
Capacity	Stadium's most recent capacity while hosting SAL baseball

Name	Team(s)	Locality	State	Opened	Capacity	Ref(s)
Ripken Stadium	Aberdeen IronBirds	Aberdeen	Maryland	2002	6,000	
Paul Eames Stadium (Note: Paul Eames Stadium was known as Polecat Park (1994–2000).)	Albany Polecats, South Georgia Waves	Albany	Georgia		4,000	
Anderson City Memorial Stadium	Anderson Senators/Giants/Tigers/Mets/Rangers, Anderson Braves	Anderson	South Carolina		6,500	
Old McCormick Field	Asheville Tourists	Asheville	North Carolina	1924	3,200	
McCormick Stadium (Note: McCormick Stadium is located on the site of the old stadium, which was completely remodeled in 1992.)	Asheville Tourists	Asheville	North Carolina	1992	4,000	
Heaton Park	Augusta Pirates/GreenJackets	Augusta	Georgia		4,000	
Lake Olmstead Stadium (Note: Lake Olmstead Stadium was known as Greenjackets Stadium (1995).)	Augusta GreenJackets	Augusta	Georgia		4,822	
Davis Park	Belmont Chiefs	Belmont	North Carolina			
Bowling Green Ballpark	Bowling Green Hot Rods	Bowling Green	Kentucky	2009	4,559	
Maimonides Park (Note: Maimonides Park was known as KeySpan Park (2001–2010) and MCU Park.)	Brooklyn Cyclones	Brooklyn	New York	2001	7,000	
J. P. Riddle Stadium	Cape Fear Crocs, Fayetteville Generals	Fayetteville	North Carolina		4,200	
Capital City Stadium	Columbia Mets, Capital City Bombers	Columbia	South Carolina		6,000	
Hampton Park (Note: Hampton Park was also known as College Park.)	Charleston Pirates/Patriots, Charleston Royals/Rainbows/RiverDogs	Charleston	South Carolina		6,000	
Joseph P. Riley Jr. Ballpark (Note: Joseph P. Riley Jr. Ballpark is also known as The Joe.)	Charleston RiverDogs	Charleston	South Carolina	1997	5,549	
Watt Powell Stadium (Note: Watt Powell Stadium was also known as Exhibition Park.)	Charleston Wheelers/Alley Cats	Charleston	West Virginia		6,800	
Clark Griffith Park (Note: Clark Griffith Park was known as Jim Crockett Memorial Park (1973–1987) and Knights Park (1988).)	Charlotte Twins	Charlotte	North Carolina	1941	7,500	
Spirit Communications Park	Columbia Fireflies	Columbia	South Carolina	2016	9,077	
Golden Park	Columbus Indians/RedStixx, South Georgia Waves/Columbus Catfish	Columbus	Georgia		5,000	
Cougar Field	Columbus RedStixx	Columbus	Georgia		5,000	
Arthur W. Perdue Stadium	Delmarva Shorebirds	Salisbury	Maryland	1996	5,200	
American Legion Stadium	Florence Blue Jays	Florence	South Carolina		3,500	
Harry Grove Stadium	Frederick Keys	Frederick	Maryland	1990	5,400	
Sims Legion Park (Note: Sims Legion Park was known as Sims Stadium (1950).)	Gastonia Rippers/Pirates, Gastonia Rangers/Expos/Jets/Tigers, Gastonia Cardinals	Gastonia	North Carolina		4,500	
War Memorial Stadium	Greensboro Hornets/Bats/Grasshoppers	Greensboro	North Carolina	1926	7,500	
First National Bank Field (Note: First National Bank Field was also known as NewBridge Bank Park and First Horizon Park.)	Greensboro Grasshoppers	Greensboro	North Carolina	2005	7,499	
Meadowbrook Park (Note: Meadowbrook Park was also known as Cambria Park and Griffith Park.)	Greenville Braves, Greenville Mets, Greenville Red Sox/Rangers	Greenville	South Carolina		6,000	
Greenville Municipal Stadium	Greenville Bombers	Greenville	South Carolina		7,027	
Fluor Field at the West End (Note: Fluor Field at the West End was known as West End Field (2006–2007).)	Greenville Drive	Greenville	South Carolina	2006	5,700	
Legion Stadium	Greenwood Braves, Greenwood Pirates	Greenwood	South Carolina		3,500	
Municipal Stadium	Hagerstown Suns	Hagerstown	Maryland	1930	4,600	
American Legion Park	Hickory Rebels	Hickory	North Carolina		4,000	
L. P. Frans Stadium	Hickory Crawdads	Hickory	North Carolina	1993	5,100	
Fifth Third Park	Hub City Spartanburgers	Spartanburg	South Carolina	2025	5,000	
Heritage Financial Park (Note: Heritage Financial Park was formerly known as Dutchess Stadium.)	Hudson Valley Renegades	Wappingers Falls	New York	1994	5,400	
ShoreTown Ballpark (Note: ShoreTown Ballpark was formerly known as GPU FirstEnergy Park.)	Lakewood/Jersey Shore BlueClaws	Lakewood	New Jersey	2001	8,000	
Classic Auto Group Park	Lake County Captains	Eastlake	Ohio	2003	7,273	
Fieldcrest-Cannon Stadium	Piedmont Phillies/Boll Weevils, Kannapolis Intimidators	Kannapolis	North Carolina	1995	4,700	
Holt-Moffitt Field (Note: Holt-Moffitt Field was known as Wennonah Field (1937).)	Lexington Indians/Giants/Braves	Lexington	North Carolina	1938	3,000	
Applebee's Park (Note: Applebee's Park was known as Legends Stadium (2001–2003).)	Lexington Legends	Lexington	North Carolina	2001	6,033	
Luther Williams Field (Note: Luther Williams Field is also known as Luther Williams Park.)	Macon Peaches, Macon Redbirds, Macon Pirates, Macon Braves	Macon	Georgia		3,806	
Walter Bickett Stadium	Monroe Indians, (Note: The Monroe Indians started the 1969 season as the Statesville Indians and moved from Statesville, North Carolina, on June 20.) Monroe Pirates	Monroe	North Carolina		1,500	
Coastal Carolina College Field	Myrtle Beach Blue Jays/Hurricanes	Myrtle Beach	South Carolina		3,200	
American Legion Field	Newton–Conover Twins	Newton	North Carolina		7,500	
Mirmow Field	Orangeburg Cardinals/Dodgers	Orangeburg	South Carolina		3,500	
Municipal Stadium	Rock Hill Wrens/Cardinals/Indians	Rock Hill	South Carolina		8,000	
AdventHealth Stadium (Note: AdventHealth Stadium was formerly known as Floyd County Stadium (2003) and State Mutual Stadium.)	Rome Braves/Emperors	Rome	Georgia	2003	5,105	
Memorial Park (Note: Memorial Park was known as Central High School Park (1948–1951).)	Rutherford County Owls	Forest City	North Carolina		2,500	
Newman Park	Salisbury Braves/Dodgers/Astros/Senators	Salisbury	North Carolina	1932	3,500	
Grayson Stadium (Note: Grayson Stadium (William L. Grayson Stadium) was known as Municipal Field (1927–1939).)	Savannah Cardinals/Sand Gnats	Savannah	Georgia	1927	8,500	
City Park (Note: City Park was known as Shelby Park (1954).)	Shelby Colonels, Shelby Yankees/Rebels/Senators	Shelby	North Carolina		3,000	
Veterans Stadium (Note: Veterans Stadium was known as High School Stadium (1940–1943) and Shelby Park (1954).)	Shelby Reds/Pirates/Mets	Shelby	North Carolina		1,700	
Duncan Park	Spartanburg Phillies, Spartanburg Traders/Spinners/Suns	Spartanburg	South Carolina	1926	2,945	
City Park	Statesville Owls/Colts/Tigers, Statesville Indians (Note: The Statesville Indians moved to Monroe, North Carolina, on June 20, 1969, and were renamed the Monroe Indians.)	Statesville	North Carolina		3,100	
Riley Park	Sumter Indians/Astros, Sumter Braves, Sumter Flyers	Sumter	South Carolina		4,000	
Finch Field	Thomasville Hi-Toms	Thomasville	North Carolina		3,500	
Appalachian Power Park	West Virginia Power	Charleston	West Virginia	2005	4,500	
Brooks Field	Wilmington Waves	Wilmington	North Carolina		3,500	
Daniel S. Frawley Stadium (Note: Daniel S. Frawley Stadium was known as Legends Stadium (1993–1994).)	Wilmington Blue Rocks	Wilmington	Delaware	1993	6,404	
Truist Stadium (Note: Truist Stadium previously called BB&T Ballpark.)	Winston-Salem Dash	Winston-Salem	North Carolina	2010	5,500	

=== Map ===
South Atlantic League stadium locations

== See also ==
- List of High-A baseball stadiums
- List of Midwest League stadiums
- List of Northwest League stadiums
