= Darlington Fiddlers =

Former baseball team in South Carolina, United States

- 1906–1907; Darlington, South Carolina

Minor league affiliations
- Class: Class D (1906–1907)
- League: South Carolina League (1906–1907)

Major league affiliations
- Team: None

Minor league titles
- League titles (0): None

Team data
- Name: Darlington Fiddlers (1906–1907)
- Ballpark: Unknown (1906–1907)

The Darlington Fiddlers were a minor league baseball team based in Darlington, South Carolina in 1906 and 1907. Darlington played as a member of the Class D level South Carolina League.

== History ==
In 1906, Darlington, South Carolina began minor league play, as the city gained a charter franchise in the six–team South Carolina League. The South Carolina League formed for the 1906 season as a Class D level minor league. The Camden, Georgetown, Manning, Orangeburg Cotton Pickers and Sumter Gamecocks teams joined Darlington as South Carolina League charter members. The final 1906 South Carolina League records, rosters and standings are unknown.

In 1907, the Darlington Fiddlers relocated during their second season of play. Darlington continued play in the South Carolina League, beginning league play on May 20, 1907. The league added the Anderson Electricians, Greenville Mountaineers and Spartanburg Spartans as new franchises. On July 27, 1907, Darlington with an 18–38 record moved to Florence, South Carolina and finished the season as the Florence Fiddlers. Playing under managers Frank Moffett and Crese Heismann, the team compiled a 5–7 record based in Florence to finish with an overall record of 23–45. The Anderson and Greenville franchises both folded and the league completed the 1907 season with four teams. The Sumter Game Cocks won the league championship with a 44–23 record. Sumner finished ahead of the Orangeburg Cotton Pickers (42–25), Spartanburg Spartans (36–24) and Darlington/Florence Fiddlers (23–45) in the final standings. The league held no playoffs.

Darlington folded from the South Carolina League following the 1907 season, as the league played its final 1908 season as a four-team league. Darlington, South Carolina has not hosted another minor league team.

== The ballpark ==
The name of the Darlington Fiddlers' minor league home ballpark is not referenced.

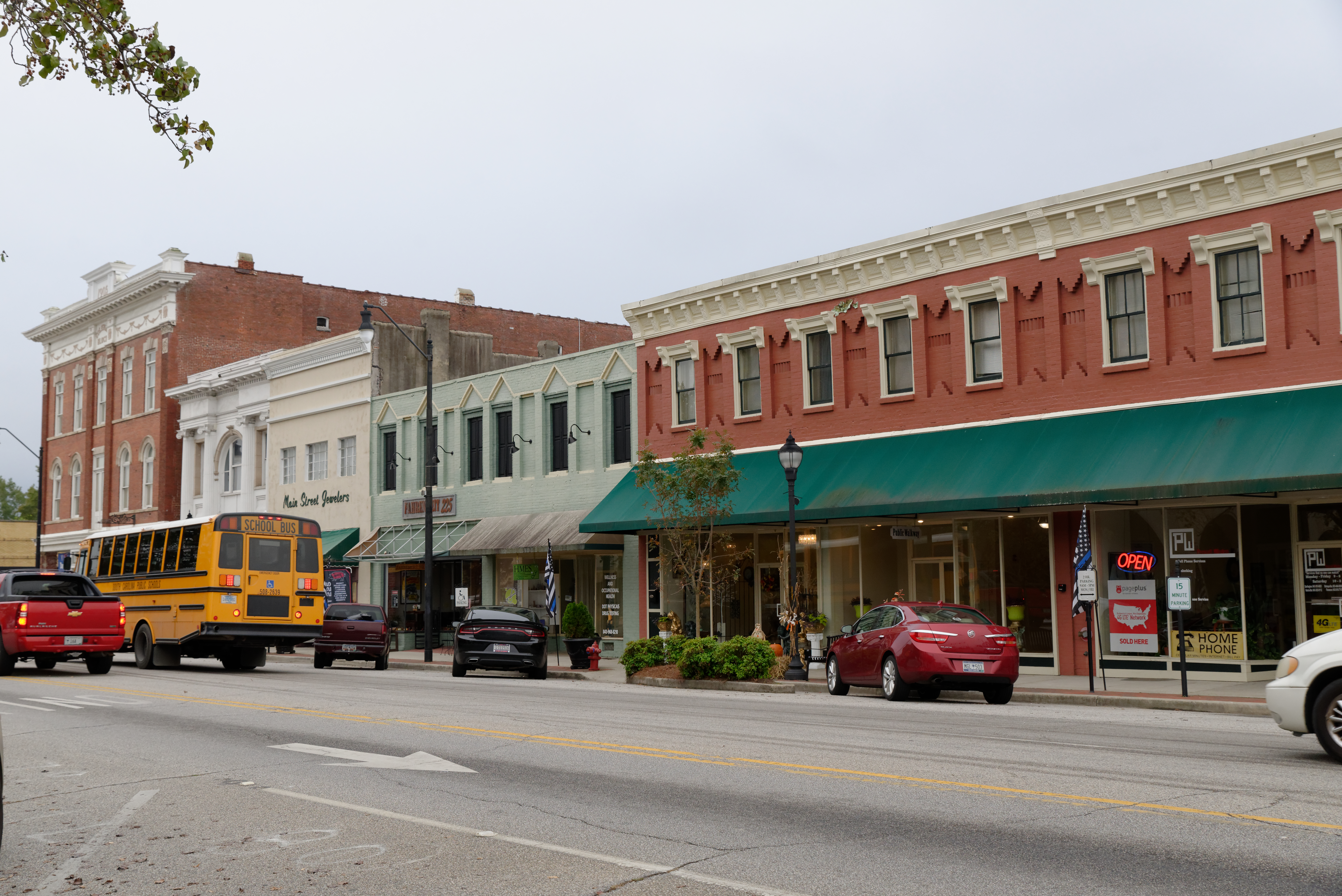
(2018) Darlington Downtown. National Register of Historic Places. Darlington, South Carolina

== Timeline ==
Year(s)	# Yrs.	Team	Level	League
1906	1	Darlington Fiddlers	Class D	South Carolina League
1907 (1)	1	Darlington Fiddlers	Class D	South Carolina League
1907 (2)	1	Florence Fiddlers	Class D	South Carolina League

== Year–by–year records ==
Year	Record	Finish	Manager	Playoffs/Notes
1906	00–00	NA	NA	1906 league records unknown
1907	23–45	4th	Frank Moffett / Crese Heismann	Darlington (18–38) moved to Florence June 27

== Notable alumni ==
- Jim Baskette (1907)
- Charlie DeArmond (1907)
- Roy Evans (1907)
- Bob Fisher (1907)
- Crese Heismann (1907, MGR)

== See also ==
- Darlington/Florence Fiddlers players
