= Sumter Chicks =

- 1949–1950; (1907–1908 1949–1950); Sumter, South Carolina

Minor league affiliations
- Previous classes: Class D (1907–1908) Class A (1949–1950)
- Previous leagues: South Carolina League (1907–1908); Tri-State League (1949–1950)

Major league affiliations
- Previous teams: None

Minor league titles
- League titles (2): 1907, 1908

Team data
- Previous names: Sumter Game Cocks (1907–1908); Sumter Chicks (1949–1950)
- Previous parks: Riley Park

The Sumter Chicks were a minor league baseball team based in Sumter, South Carolina, United States that played in the Tri-State League in 1949 and 1950.

== History ==
The Sumter Chicks were preceded by the Sumter Game Cocks, who played as members of the South Carolina League in 1907 and 1908. Sumter won the league championship in both seasons.

It was reported that Sumter defeated Chester 2–1 in 10–innings on July 24, 1908. It was noted in the Chester newspaper, on July 28, 1908, that "some of the fans were greatly disappointed at the very rude manner in which they were treated while in Sumter last week."

On July 27, 1908, Sumter was in 1st place with a 39–26 record, with the season soon to conclude, as reported in newspaper standings. The Chester Lantern newspaper stated "we want justice" in the final standings, due to Orageburg's poor play against Sumter, due to the "desire of Orangeburg that Sumter should win the pennant this year."

The Sumter Gamecocks ended the 1908 South Carolina League season with a record of 41–27, winning their second consecutive championship. The Chester Collegians (40–30) finished 2.0 games behind the 1st place Gamecocks, followed by the Rock Hill Catawbas (28–40) and Orangeburg Cotton Pickers (27–39) in the 1908 final standings.

The Chicks played at Riley Park. Tony Daniels and Wes Livengood played for them.

The 1949 season attendance was 55,309, last in the 8–team Tri-State League. In 1950, attendance dropped to 30,324, again the lowest in the league. In 1952, the Chicks and the Florence Steelers were replaced by the Greenwood Tigers and Greenville Spinners in the Tri-State League.

In 1970, the Sumter Indians resumed minor league play as members of the Western Carolinas League.

== The ballpark ==
Sumter teams played at Riley Park. Riley Park is still in use today as home to the University of South Carolina Sumter Fire Ants and Morris College Hornet baseball teams. The Sumter Chicks (1949-1950) of the Tri-State League, Sumter Indians (1970) and Sumter Astros (1971) of the Western Carolinas League and the Sumter Braves (1985-1990) and Sumter Flyers (1991) of the South Atlantic League all played at Riley Park. The ballpark is located at Church Street & DuBose Street, Sumter, South Carolina, 29150.

== Notable alumni ==
- Tony Daniels (1949)
- Wes Livengood (1949, MGR)

== Year–by–year records ==
| Year | Record | Finish | Manager | Notes |
|---|---|---|---|---|
| 1907 | 44–23 | 1st | Guy Gunter | League champions |
| 1908 | 41–27 | 1st | Fred Dingle | League champions |
| 1949 | 65–80 | 6th | Wes Livengood / Glen Schaeffer | Did not qualify |
| 1950 | 53–91 | 8th | Charles Biggs / Vance Carlson | Did not qualify |
