= Sumter Indians =

- 1970–1971; Sumter, South Carolina

Minor league affiliations
- Class: Class A (1970–1971)
- League: Western Carolinas League (1970–1971)

Major league affiliations
- Team: Houston Astros (1971); Cleveland Indians (1970)

Team data
- Name: Sumter Indians (1970); Sumter Astros (1971)
- Ballpark: Riley Park (1970–1971)

The Sumter Indians was a minor league baseball team, based in Sumter, South Carolina, as a member of the Western Carolinas League.

== History ==
The team was formed when the Cleveland Indians relocated their Class-A affiliate, the Monroe Indians, to Sumter in 1970 and Sumter, was home to professional baseball for the first time in 20 years with the arrival of the club. After a last-place, 23-43 first half, the 1970 Indians went 38–26 in the second half, only one and a half games behind the first-place Greenville Red Sox.

The following season, Sumter was an affiliate of the Houston Astros, becoming the Sumter Astros in 1971. They were replaced in the league in 1972, when the Sumter Astros and Monroe Pirates were replaced by the Charlotte Twins and the Gastonia Pirates in the six team league.

== The ballpark ==
Sumner teams played at Riley Park. Located at Church Street & DuBose Street, 29150. It is still in use today as home to the University of South Carolina Sumter Fire Ants and Morris College Hornet baseball teams. The Sumter Chicks (1949-1950) of the Tri-State League, Sumter Indians (1970) and Sumter Astros (1971) of the Western Carolinas League and the Sumter Braves (1985-1990) and Sumter Flyers (1991) of the South Atlantic League all played at Riley Park.

== Notable alumni ==
- Buddy Bell (1970) 5 x MLB All-Star
- Jackie Brandt (1971, MGR) 2 x MLB All-Star
- Jim Kern (1970) 3 x MLB All-Star
- John McLaren (1971)

== Season results ==
| Year | Team | Record | Finish | Manager | Playoffs |
|---|---|---|---|---|---|
| 1970 | Indians | 61-68 | 4th | Len Johnston | No playoffs |
| 1971 | Astros | 47-80 | 5th | Jackie Brandt | No playoffs |
