= Chester Collegians =

- 1908; Chester, South Carolina

Minor league affiliations
- Class: Class D (1908)
- League: South Carolina League (1908)

Major league affiliations
- Team: None

Minor league titles
- League titles (0): None

Team data
- Name: Chester Collegians (1908)
- Ballpark: Fairgrounds Ball Park (1908)

The Chester Collegians were a minor league baseball team based in Chester, South Carolina. In 1908, the Collegians played the season as a member of the Class D level South Carolina League, hosting minor league home games at the Fairgrounds Ball Park.

== History ==
In 1908, Chester, South Carolina gained a franchise in the four–team Class D level South Carolina League. The Chester Collegians joined by the Orangeburg Cotton Pickers, Rock Hill Catawbas and Sumter Gamecocks in the 1908 league.

The use of the "Collegians" moniker corresponds to Chester having two high Schools-colleges in 1908 as noted in the 1908–1909 Chester Directory. The different area schools are listed under "white" and "colored" in the directory headings. Chester was also home to the Brainerd Institute in the era.

After beginning league play on May 4, 1908, Chester was in 2nd place on July 7, 1908 with a 28–18 record, behind Sumter with a 30–16 record, as reported in newspaper standings from the Chester newspaper, "The Lantern". Chester had won two games at Rock Hill 2–0 and 4–0 in the two preceding games, with the "rain god" raining out the second game of a Saturday scheduled doubleheader.

Chester lost at Orangeburg 2–1 in 10–innings on July 24, 1908. Chester lost at Rock Hill by a score of 9–5 on July 27, 1908, as Prim hit a home run for Chester in the loss. Thanckham and Hamrick were the Chester battery. It was noted in the Chester newspaper, on July 28, 1908 that "some of the fans were greatly disappointed at the very rude manner in which they were treated while in Sumter last week."

On July 27, 1908, Chester was in second place with a 37–28 record, as reported in newspaper standings. The Lantern newspaper noted that the season was nearing an end, with Chester scheduled to host Rock Hill in an upcoming series. The newspaper states "we want justice" in the final standings, due to Orangeburg's poor play against Sumpter, due to the "desire of Orangeburg that Sumter should win the pennant this year."

The Chester Collegians ended the South Carolina League season with a record of 40–30, placing second in the league. L.C Drake of Chester led the league in runs scored with 38. H. P. Caldwell served as manager, as the Chester Collegians finished two games behind the first place Sumter Gamecocks (41–27) and ahead of the third place Rock Hill Catawbas (28–40) and fourth place Orangeburg Cotton Pickers (27–39) in the 1908 final standings.

The South Carolina league permanently folded following the 1908 season. Chester, South Carolina has not hosted another minor league team.

== The ballpark ==
Chester played home games at Fairgrounds Ball Park. The ballpark site is still in use today as a public park with baseball fields. Called the "Chester Sports Complex" today, the ballpark was located at Brendale Drive & Stadium Drive, Chester, South Carolina.

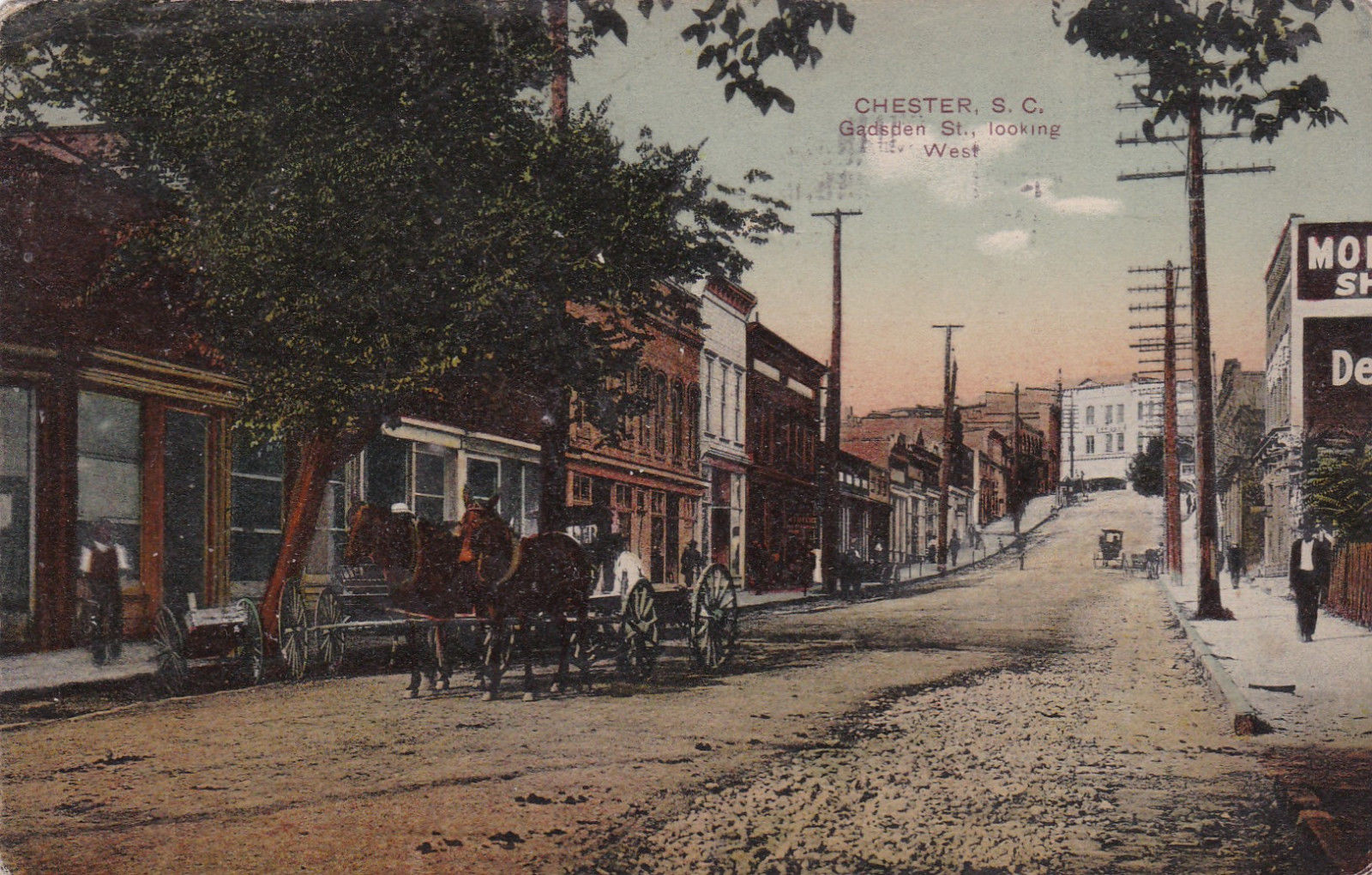
Chester - Gadsden Street - 1910

== Year–by–year record ==
Year	Record	Finish	Manager	Playoffs/Notes
1908	40–30	2nd	H. P. Caldwell	No playoffs held

== Notable alumni ==
- Ducky Yount (1908)

=== See also ===
Chester Collegians players
