= Bob Sadowski =

Bob Sadowski may refer to:

- Bob Sadowski (third baseman) (1937–2017), American who played 1960–1963, later manager
- Bob Sadowski (pitcher) (born 1938), American who played 1963–1966
