= Rock Hill Cardinals =

- 1963–1968; Rock Hill, South Carolina

Minor league affiliations
- Class: Class A (1963–1968)
- League: Western Carolinas League (1963–1968)

Major league affiliations
- Team: Cleveland Indians (1967–1968); St. Louis Cardinals (1964–1966); Co-op (1963)

Minor league titles
- League titles (1): 1965
- Conference titles (2): 1964; 1965

Team data
- Name: Rock Hill Indians (1967–1968); Rock Hill Cardinals (1964–1966); Rock Hill Wrens (1963)
- Ballpark: Municipal Stadium (1963–1968)

The Rock Hill Cardinals were a minor league baseball team based in Rock Hill, South Carolina. From 1963 to 1968, Rock Hill teams played as members of the Class A level Western Carolinas League. Rock Hill played as the "Wrens" in 1963 and the Rock Hill "Cardinals" played from 1964 to 1966 as a minor league affiliate of the St. Louis Cardinals, winning the 1965 league championship. The franchise became a Cleveland Indians affiliate for the 1967 and 1968 seasons and adopted the corresponding "Indians" nickname.

Two Baseball Hall of Fame members are alumni of the Rock Hill Cardinals. Sparky Anderson managed the team to the 1965 league championship and Steve Carlton pitched for the Rock Hill Cardinals in 1964 in his first professional season at age 19.

The Rock Hill teams hosted minor league home games at Municipal Stadium in Rock Hill. The site still hosts sporting events today.

== History ==
=== Early minor league teams ===
Minor league baseball began in Rock Hill in 1908, when the Rock Hill Catawabas played the season as members of the four-team Class D level South Carolina League. Rock Hill finished in third place the final season for the league.

The Rock Hill Chiefs franchise was the next minor league team hosted in Rock Hill. From 1947 to 1955, the Chiefs played as members of the Class B level Tri-State League, winning the 1950 league championship. The Tri-State League folded following the 1955 season.

=== 1963: Western Carolinas League membership begins ===
Minor league baseball resumed in 1963, when the Rock Hill Wrens became members of the eight-team, Class A level Western Carolinas League as an expansion franchise. The name 'Wrens' came from the state bird of South Carolina, the Carolina wren. The league had been classified as a Class D level league through 1962, when it ended the season as a four-team league with the Newton-Conover Twins, Salisbury Braves, Shelby Colonels and Statesville Owls as members.

In 1963, Rock Hill joined the Gastonia Pirates, Greenville Braves (Milwaukee Braves minor league affiliate), Lexington Giants (San Francisco Giants), Salisbury Dodgers (Los Angeles Dodgers), Shelby Colonels (New York Yankees), Spartanburg Phillies (Philadelphia Phillies) and Statesville Owls teams in beginning Western Carolinas League play on April 24, 1963.

The Wrens ended their 1963 season with a final overall record of 63–63, as the Western Carolinas League played a split season schedule. The Wrens did not have a major league affiliate and were a "coop" team, accepting players from other minor league affiliate teams. Rock Hill ended the season in fifth place in the overall standings, playing the season under the direction of manager Wes Ferrell. Rock Hill finished 10.5 games behind the first place Gastonia Pirates, who had the league's best overall record but did not qualify for the playoff. The Greenville Braves won the first half pennant and the Salisbury Dodgers won the second half pennant. In the final, Greenville swept Salisbury to claim the league championship. Greenville had ended the season in sixth place with an overall record of 59–65.

Managing the Wrens at age 55, 1963 Rock Hill manager Wes Ferrell was a long-time major-league all-star pitcher, who had an arm injury that ended his pitching career. Ferrell then continued his baseball career in the minor leagues as a strong hitting outfielder. Before his Rock Hill position, Ferrell had last managed in the minor leagues in 1949 when he was a player/manager of the Tampa Bay Smokers. In 1965, Ferrell managed the Shelby Colonels team in his final season as a minor league manager.

=== 1964 to 1966: St. Louis Cardinals affiliate ===
The team became known as the Rock Hill "Cardinals" as the franchise continued play in the 1964 Class A level Western Carolinas League. Rock Hill became a minor league affiliate of the St. Louis Cardinals and adopted their nickname.

Hal Smith was named as the Rock Hill Cardinals manager for the 1964 season. Smith has been an all-star catcher for the St. Louis Cardinals before his forced retirement. Smith was selected a National League All-Star in 1957 and 1959. On June 10, 1961, after catching 42 of the Cardinals' first 48 games, Smith complained of chest and abdominal pains and He was admitted to Jewish Hospital, St. Louis, where he was diagnosed with a "coronary artery condition." The condition forced Smith to immediately retire from playing baseball. He then became the St. Louis Cardinals' bullpen coach in 1962 as Tim McCarver replaced him as St, Louis Cardinals' catcher. in 1963 he worked as a catching coach with the St. Louis Cardinals minor league teams before accepting the Rock Hill Position. Following his season at Rock Hill, Smith became a coach for the Pittsburgh Pirates in 1965. Smith had a 39-year career in professional baseball, retiring in 1997.

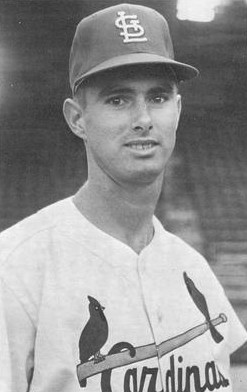
(1965) Baseball Hall of Fame member Steve Carlton, St. Louis Cardinals Carlton went 10–1 pitching for Rock Hill in 1964, his first professional season.

The 1964 Rock Hill Cardinals placed second in the eight-team Western Carolinas League overall regular season standings. Led by manager Hal Smith, the Cardinals placed second in the regular season standings with a 76–51 record, finishing just 0.5 game behind the first place Salisbury Dodgers (77–51). With the league playing a split season schedule, Rock Hill won the first–half standings, while Salisbury won the second–half standings, qualifying both for the playoff. In the playoff Final, the Salisbury Dodgers defeated Rock Hill 2 games to 1 for the championship.

At age 19, in his first professional season, Baseball Hall of Fame member Steve Carlton pitched for the 1964 Rock Hill Cardinals. With Rock Hill, Carlton compiled a 10–1 record with a 1.03 ERA and 91 strikeouts in 78 innings. A pitcher at Miami-Dade Community College, Carlton had received a $5,000 bonus when he signed with the St. Louis Cardinals organization in October 1963. Carlton was first assigned to the Class A Rock Hill Cardinals to begin the 1964 season. After his initial success at Rock Hill, during the 1964 season, he was promoted first to the Winnipeg Goldeyes and then to the Tulsa Oilers to complete his first professional season with 15 total wins. Carlton made his major league debut with the St. Louis Cardinals in April 1965. In 24 seasons of major league pitching, Carlton won 329 games and four Cy Young Awards.

In 1965, the Rock Hill Cardinals continued play as Baseball Hall of Fame member Sparky Anderson became the new manager of Rock Hill and led the Cardinals team to the Western Carolinas League championship. After stating, "If I can’t win with this club, I ought to be fired," Anderson had indeed been fired after managing the Toronto Maple Leafs of the Class AAA International League in 1964. The St. Louis Cardinals organization and general manager Bob Howsam hired Anderson to manage their Rock Hill affiliate just before the start of 1965 season.

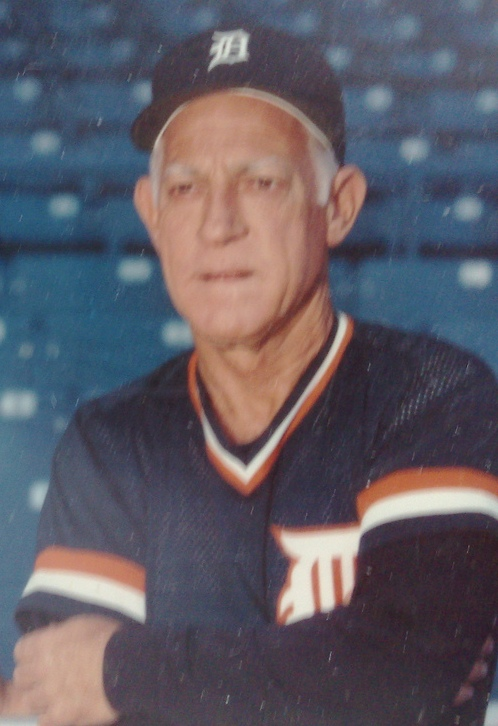
(1984) Sparky Anderson, manager Detroit Tigers. A member of the Baseball Hall of Fame, Anderson managed Rock Hill to the 1964 Western Carolinas League.

After placing fifth in the regular season overall standings with a 59–63 record, Rock Hill qualified for the playoffs by winning the second–half pennant, as the league had a split–season format. Rock Hill finished 13.0 games behind the first place Salisbury Astros in the overall standings. Salisbury won the first half pennant. In the 1965 Western Carolinas League playoff, Rock Hill defeated the Salisbury Astros 2 games to 0 in the final to capture the Western Carolinas League championship. Rock Hill pitcher Felix Roque won 18 games to lead the Western Carolinas League. His Cardinal teammate Sal Campisi had a league leading 1.95 ERA.

Following his season in leading Rock Hill to the 1965 Western Carolinas League championship, Sparky Anderson won minor league championships for the next three seasons. In 1966 Anderson managed the St. Petersburg Cardinals of the Florida State League to the league title. He then won championships with the 1967 Modesto Reds in the California League and with the 1968 Asheville Tourists in the Double-A Southern League. In 1969, Anderson became the third-base coach of the expansion San Diego Padres before becoming the manager of the Cincinnati Reds in 1970. As a major manager, Anderson won the 1975 and 1976 World Series with the Cincinnati Reds and the 1984 World Series with the Detroit Tigers.

The 1966 season was Rock Hill's final season as St. Louis Cardinals minor league affiliate as the team continued play in the eight-team, Class A level Western Carolinas League. The defending champion Cardinals ended the season with a record of 58–68 to finish in fifth place, playing the season under manager Jack Krol. ended the season 33.0 games behind the first place Spartanburg Phillies. No playoffs were held as Spartanburg won both halves of the spilt season schedule. Baseball Hall of Fame member Nolan Ryan of the Greenville Mets compiled a 17–2 record with a Western Carolinas League leading 272 strikeouts. Overall, Ryan had 307 strikeouts on the season.

While pitching for Rock Hill in 1966, Cardinal pitcher Mike Torrez won two games in one day. Against the Salisbury Astros, Torres won the two games by first finishing a game that had been suspended and the pitching 7 2/3 innings in the second game. For the season, Torrez made the league All-Star team, posting a 7–4 record, with a 2.50 ERA in 90 innings. Torrez went on to have a lengthy major league career.

=== 1967 & 1968: Cleveland Indians affiliate ===
In 1967, Rock Hill became a minor league affiliate of the Cleveland Indians and the team continued play in the Western Carolinas League known as the Rock Hill "Indians." The league reduced to six teams as the Thomasville Hi-Toms and Gastonia Pirates did not return to the league. The Rock Hill Indians finished in last place in the final regular season standings.

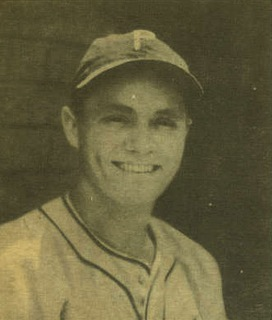
(1940) Merrill "Pinky" May, Philadelphia Phillies baseball card. May managed the Rock Hill Indians in 1967 and 1968.

Playing the 1967 season with their new affiliate, the Rock Hill Indians ended the season with an overall record of 46–72, Rock Hill ended the season in sixth place, playing he season under manager Merrill Pinky May. In the overall standings, Rock Hill finished 31.5 games behind the first place Spartanburg Phillies. No playoffs were held as the Spartanburg Phillies won both halves of the spilt season schedule for the second consecutive season.

Rock Hill manager Pinky May had played for the Philadelphia Phillies from 1939 to 1943 before his major league career was interrupted by his service during World War II. Following his military service, May became a long-time minor league manager from 1946 until his retirement in 1972. May had served in the United States Navy during World War II. Pinky May's son was longtime major league catcher Milt May. As a youth, Milt May served as a bat boy for his father's minor league teams.

Bo Rein played for the Rock Hill Indians in both 1967 and 1968. Rein had played both football and baseball at Ohio State University. From 1964 to 1966, Rein was a three-year starter at left halfback for the Ohio State Buckeyes football team, leading the team in receptions in 1964 and 1965 and in rushing in 1966. Rein finished at Ohio State as the team career receptions leader. Following his Ohio State career, Rein was drafted by the Baltimore Colts. Rein also played baseball at Ohio State University from 1965 through 1967, helping the Ohio State Buckeyes baseball team win the 1966 College World Series. Playing shortstop and left field, Rein led the Buckeyes in stolen bases in 1965 and 1966, and in doubles and runs in 1966. Rein finished with 49 career stolen bases, which stood as a team record.

In May 1967, Rein was ruled ineligible for the remainder the Ohio State 1967 baseball season. Rein was subsequently drafted by the Cleveland Indians in June 1967 the 40th round of the 1967 Major League Baseball draft and assigned to Rock Hill in 1967 for his first professional season at age 22. Rein returned to Rock Hill in 1968, hitting .270 with 24 stolen bases in 48 games. In 1969, Rein was playing for the Class AAA level Portland Beavers, when Achilles tendon and hamstring injuries ended his baseball career.

In the fall of 1969, Rein began a football coaching career. Lou Holtz, a former assistant coach at Ohio State became the head coach at William & Mary and hired Rein as an assistant coach. In 1972, Holtz became the head coach at North Carolina State University, taking Rein with him as an assistant. In 1975, Rein was hired as offensive coordinator for the University of Arkansas under Frank Broyles. In 1976, Rein became the youngest college football head coach when he was hired by North Carolina State to replace Holtz. Rein led NC State to two bowl games, winning the 1977 Peach Bowl and 1978 Tangerine Bowl. In 1979, Rein led the team to the Atlantic Coast Conference championship.

Following the 1979 season, Rein was hired to become the head coach Louisiana State University. On January 10, 1980, Rein was returning from recruiting trip to Shreveport, Louisiana when his private aircraft crashed, leaving no survivors. The bodies of Rein and pilot Louis Benscotte were never recovered.

In their final season, the 1968 Rock Hill Indians ended the season in fifth place in the six-team league. With an overall record of 54–67, playing the season under returning manager Pinky May, Rock Hill finished 17.5 games behind the first place Greenwood Braves. Did not qualify for the playoff won by the Spartanburg Phillies over Greenwood. Both qualified for the playoff after Greenwood had won the first half of the split season schedule and Spartanburg won the second half.

Pitching for Rock Hill in 1968, in his first professional season after his collegiate career at East Carolina University, Vince Colbert had 10–2 record and 1.95 earned run average, with 99 strikeouts in 97 innings pitched.

The Rock Hill team folded from the Western Carolinas League after the 1968 season. After drawing a league low 21,136 total fans for the 1968 season, the Rock Hill franchise relocated and replaced by the Cleveland Indians affiliate Statesville Indians in the 1969 league. Rock Hill has not hosted another minor league team.

== The ballpark ==
Rock Hill teams hosted minor league games at the Municipal Stadium. Municipal Stadium had a capacity of 6,800 in 1949 and 8,000 in 1963, with dimensions of 301–406–330. Municipal Stadium was first built as a Works Progress Administration project and that facility was demolished in 1984. In the era, the ballpark was located at the corner of York Avenue & Cherry Road in Rock Hill, South Carolina.

Today, the ballpark site is home to the Rock Hill District Three Stadium, which is adjacent to the campus of Winthrop University. The stadium is located at 211 South Cherry Creek Road in Rock Hill, South Carolina.

== Timeline ==
Year(s)	# Yrs.	Team	Level	League	Affiliate	Ballpark
1963	1	Rock Hill Wrens	Class A	Western Carolinas League	Coop	Municipal Stadium
1964–1966	3	Rock Hill Cardinals	Class A	Western Carolinas League	St. Louis Cardinals	Municipal Stadium
1967–1968	2	Rock Hill Indians	Class A	Western Carolinas League	Cleveland Indians	Municipal Stadium

== Year–by–year records ==
Year	Record	Finish	Manager	Playoffs/Notes
1963	63–63	5th	Wes Ferrell	Did not qualify
1964	75–51	2nd	Hal Smith	Won 1st half pennant Lost in final
1965	59–63	5th	Sparky Anderson	Won 2nd half pennant League champions
1966	58–68	5th	Jack Krol	No playoffs held
1967	46–72	6th	Pinky May	No playoffs held
1968	54–67	5th	Pinky May	Did not qualify

== Notable alumni ==
- Sparky Anderson (1965, MGR) Inducted Baseball Hall of Fame, 2000
- Steve Carlton (1964) Inducted Baseball Hall of Fame, 1994
- José Arcia (1964)
- Mark Ballinger (1967)
- Jack Brohamer (1968)
- Vince Colbert (1968)
- Sal Campisi (1964)
- Vic Correll (1967–1968)
- Jim Cosman (1964)
- Boots Day (1966)
- Wes Ferrell (1963, MGR) 2x MLB All-Star; 1935 AL Wins Leader; Cleveland Indians Hall of Fame; Boston Red Sox Hall of Fame
- Jack Heidemann (1967)
- Jim Kern (1968) 3x MLB All-Star
- Jack Krol (1966, MGR)
- Chuck Machemehl (1968)
- Pinky May (1967, MGR) MLB All-Star
- Willie Montañez (1966) MLB All-Star
- John Paciorek (1968)
- Bo Rein (1968)
- Jerry Robertson (1965)
- Sonny Ruberto (1964)
- Bob Schaefer (1966)
- Hal Smith (1964, MGR) 3x MLB All-Star
- Ed Sprague (1966)
- Stan Swanson (1963)
- Dick Tidrow (1967)
- Mike Torrez (1966)
- Jack Whillock (1966)

== See also ==
- Rock Hill Wrens players
- Rock Hill Cardinals players
- Rock Hill Indians players
