= Bleacher Creature (mascot) =

Mascot for the Atlanta Braves Major League Baseball team

- Team: Atlanta Braves
- Description: Furry green creature
- First seen: 1976

The Bleacher Creature was the official mascot for the Atlanta Braves Major League Baseball team during the late 1970s and early 1980s. It featured green shaggy fur with a Braves cap and logo on top. The word Braves was written across its chest in big red letters. It had a permanent toothless smile. The mascot usually roamed the stands from time to time during home games and was intended more for the entertainment of younger fans.

== Creation ==
The mascot started in 1976 and was originally costumed by Alan Stensland, then a student at Georgia Tech. Stensland was working as an usher at Atlanta–Fulton County Stadium when he was approached to wear the costume. The outfit required someone who was 5"8" to 5'10" tall, and Alan met the height and shoe size requirements. Alan recalls having one of his costume's eyes removed by a youngster on his first night out. They also attempted to bust his kneecaps on bat night. During the 1977 season, the mascot made some 250 appearances at games, parties, and parades.

Stensland was only 18 at the time he first donned the costume. The most intense problem he had was the heat. With the added humidity, a really "funky smell" permeated the inside of the costume. Once Stensland graduated, he left the Braves organization.

The mascot role was then taken over by Dennis Coffey, a friend of Alan and a student at M.D. Collins High School in College Park, Georgia. Coffey had worked as an usher during the 1977 Braves and Atlanta Falcons seasons at Atlanta–Fulton County Stadium and served as an assistant to Stensland. Dennis performed as the Braves Bleacher Creature from 1978 to 1981, when the mascot was retired. During that time, the Bleacher Creature was present at all Atlanta home games, and numerous home games for the Savannah Braves and Greenwood Braves. Dennis appeared as the Bleacher Creature in various parades, schools, hospitals, little league events, mall openings, etc. Coffey graduated from M.D. Collins High and went on to also attend and graduate from Georgia Tech.

Public appearances were scheduled through the Atlanta Braves Public Relations office. These appearances were most often for charitable events such as the Special Olympics, hospital visits, public events, such as parades, little league opening day ceremonies, and Spring Festivals all over Georgia and the southeast. Coffey appeared as the Bleacher Creature in places as far away as Decatur, Alabama. As the Bleacher Creature, Dennis Coffey typically made 8 to 10 scheduled appearances per week during the off-season and as many as 20 appearances weekly during baseball season, in addition to being present at all Atlanta Braves home games.

== Redesign ==
The original Bleacher Creature costume was designed and fabricated by Kathy Spetz. After several successful years, the Braves organization decided to 'slim down' the Bleacher Creature. Spetz redesigned the mascot with a slimmer physique and the Braves introduced his new profile mid-season 1980. An introduction party was set up at a Braves home game, pre-event media was used to announce the change and special hats were given out to all fans attending. Coffey continued to fill the Bleacher Creature role until the mascot was retired at the close of the 1981 Braves season. Dennis Coffey's notable quote when asked about being the Bleacher Creature was most commonly, "It's fun if you like being green!" Coffey enjoyed being green as he was mentioned in many newspaper articles and press releases during his career with the Braves as being humorous, fun-loving and great with fans and kids alike.
