= South Carolina League =

- Classification: Class D (1906–1908)
- Sport: Minor League Baseball
- First season: 1906
- Folded: 1908
- President: Mendel L. Smith (1906–1908)
- No. of teams: 11
- Country: United States of America
- Most titles: 2 Sumter Gamecocks (1907, 1908)

The South Carolina League, also known as the South Carolina State League, was a minor league baseball league that played from 1906 to 1908. The Class D level South Carolina League consisted entirely of franchises based in South Carolina for its three seasons of play. The Sumter Gamecocks won league championships in 1907 and 1908.

== History ==
The South Carolina League formed for the first time in the 1906 season as a six–team Class D level minor league. The 1906 charter league member teams were Camden, the Darlington Fiddlers, Georgetown, Manning, the Orangeburg Cotton Pickers and Sumter Gamecocks. The final 1906 South Carolina League records and standings are unknown.

In 1907, the Class D level South Carolina League continued as a six–team league under league president Mendel L. Smith, beginning play on May 20, 1907. The league added the Anderson Electricians, Greenville Mountaineers and Spartanburg Spartans as new franchises. On July 27, 1907, Darlington moved to Florence and the Anderson and Greenville franchises both folded. Completing the 1907 season with four teams, the Sumter Game Cocks won the league championship with a 44–23 record. Sumner finished ahead of the Orangeburg Cotton Pickers (42–25), Spartanburg Spartans (36–24) and Darlington/Florence Fiddlers (23–45) in the standings and were champions as the league held no playoffs.

In 1908, the South Carolina League played their final season as a four–team Class D level league, beginning play on May 4, 1908. The Sumter Gamecocks defended their title, posting a 41–27 regular season record, as the league held no playoffs. Sumter was followed by the Chester Collegians (40–30), Rock Hill Catawbas (28–40) and Orangeburg Edistoes (27–39). The South Carolina permanently folded following the 1908 season.

== South Carolina League teams ==
Team name(s)	City represented	Ballpark	Year(s) active
Anderson Electricians	Anderson, South Carolina	Unknown	1907
Camden	Camden, South Carolina	Unknown	1906
Chester Collegians	Chester, South Carolina	Fairgrounds Ballpark	1908
Darlington Fiddlers	Darlington, South Carolina	Unknown	1906 to 1907
Florence Fiddlers	Florence, South Carolina	Unknown	1907
Georgetown	Georgetown, South Carolina	Unknown	1906
Greenville Edistoes	Greenville, South Carolina	Furman Park	1907
Manning	Manning, South Carolina	Unknown	1906
Orangeburg Cotton Pickers	Orangeburg, South Carolina	Unknown	1906 to 1908
Rock Hill Catawbas	Rock Hill, South Carolina	Unknown	1908
Spartanburg Spartans	Spartanburg, South Carolina	Unknown	1907
Sumter Gamecocks	Sumter, South Carolina	Unknown	1906 to 1908

== Standings & statistics ==
=== 1906 to 1908 ===
1906 South Carolina League
Standings and statistics not available

1907 South Carolina League

Team name	W	L	PCT	GB	Managers
Sumter Gamecocks	44	23	.657	–	Guy Gunter
Orangeburg Cotton Pickers	42	25	.627	2	J.P. Doyle
Spartanburg Spartans	36	34	.514	9½	J.W. McMakin
Darlington Fiddlers/ Florence Fiddlers	23	45	.338	21½	Crese Heismann / Clyde Russell / Schmitz
Greenville Edistoes	25	28	.472	NA	Tom Stouch
Anderson Electricians	21	36	.368	NA	Bagwell

Player statistics
Player	Team	Stat	Tot	Player	Team	Stat	Tot
J.C. Watson	Spartanburg	BA	.327	Sam Lansford	Orangeburg	W	18
Ralph McLaurin	Sumter	Hits	88	Sam Lansford	Orangeburg	Pct.	.783; 18–5
Walter Rikard	Orangeburg	SB	37				

1908 South Carolina League

Team name	W	L	PCT	GB	Managers
Sumter Gamecocks	41	27	.603	–	Frank Dingle
Chester Collegians	40	30	.571	2	H.P. Caldwell
Rock Hill Catawbas	28	40	.412	13	Guy Gunter
Orangeburg Cotton Pickers	27	39	.409	13	J.P. Doyle; Roy Miller / Ed Sawyer

Player statistics
Player	Team	Stat	Tot	Player	Team	Stat	Tot
L. B. Simmons	Orangeburg	BA	.354	Bill Temple	Chester	W	15
Fred Prim	Orangeburg/Chester	Hits	69	Elmer Long	Sumter	PCT	.750 9–3
L. C. Drake	Chester	Runs	38				
