= Belmont Chiefs =

- 1961; Belmont, North Carolina

Minor league affiliations
- Class: Class D (1961)
- League: Western Carolina League (1961)

Major league affiliations
- Team: San Francisco Giants (1961)

Minor league titles
- League titles (0): None

Team data
- Name: Belmont Chiefs (1961)
- Ballpark: Davis Park (1961)

The Belmont Chiefs were a minor league baseball team based in Lexington, North Carolina. In 1961, the Chiefs played as members of the Western Carolina League, finishing the season in fifth place. The Belmont Chiefs were a minor league affiliate of the San Francisco Giants and hosted minor league home games at Davis Park.

== History ==
In 1961, minor league baseball play began in Belmont, North Carolina, when the Belmont "Chiefs" began play as members in the six–team Class D level Western Carolina League. The Chiefs were a minor league affiliate of the San Francisco Giants in 1961. Belmont joined the Salisbury Braves, Statesville Owls, Lexington Indians, Shelby Colonels and Newton-Conover Twins in league play.

The Belmont Chiefs were partially owned by Jim Poole, who also began the season at the Chiefs' manager. The team began the season with a 2–22 record. On May 27, 1961, Whitey Ries replaced Poole as manager. On July 17, 1961, Ries was replaced as manager by Max Lanier.

After beginning Western Carolina League play on May 1, 1961, Belmont finished the season in fifth place in the final Western Carolina League standings. The Chiefs improved to go 37–39 after their 2–22 start and had a final record of 39–61. The Chiefs finished the season 24.0 games behind the first place Salisbury Braves in the final standings. The Belmont Chiefs folded after the 1961 season, after drawing 10,081 home fans for the season. The Western Carolina League reduced to four teams in 1962.

Belmont, North Carolina has not hosted another minor league team.

== The ballparks ==
The Belmont Chiefs hosted their minor league home games at Davis Park. Today, Davis Park is still in use as a public park with a baseball field. Davis Park is located at 203 Park Drive in Belmont, North Carolina.

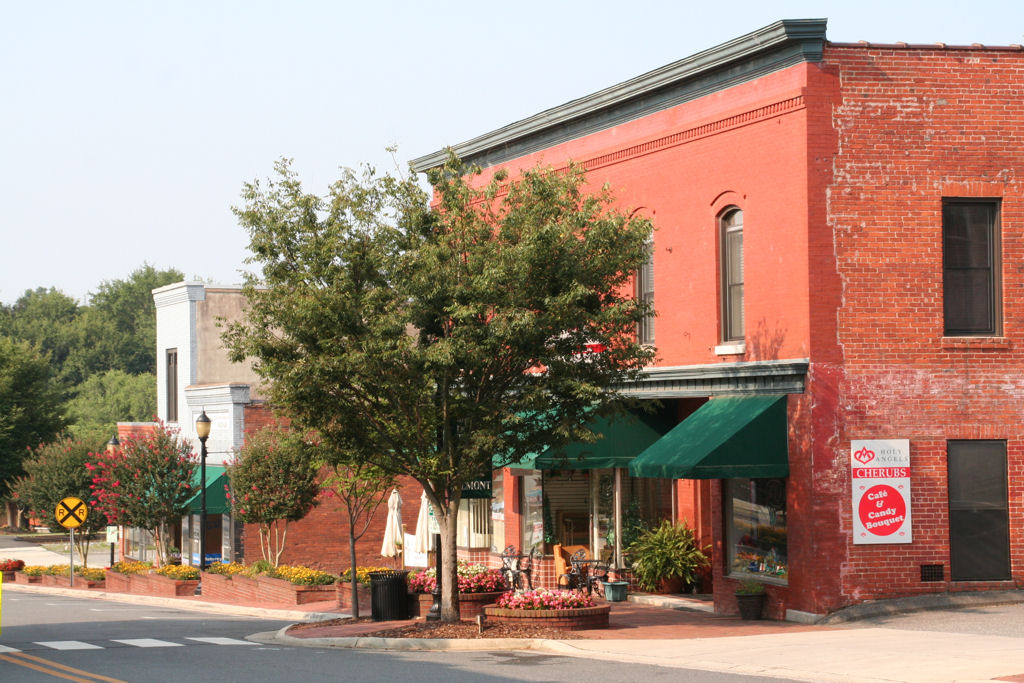
(2007) Downtown. Belmont, North Carolina

== Timeline ==
Year(s)	# Yrs.	Team	Level	League	Affiliate	Ballpark
1961	1	Belmont Chiefs	Class D	Western Carolina League	San Francisco Giants	Davis Park

== Year–by–year record ==
Year	Record	Finish	Manager	Attend	Playoffs/Notes
1961	39–61	5th	Jim Poole (2–22) / Whitey Ries / Max Lanier	10,081	Did not qualify

== Notable alumni ==
- Max Lanier (1961, MGR) 2x MLB All–Star
- Jim Poole (1961, MGR)
- Fred Wenz (1961)

== See also ==
- Belmont Chiefs players
