= Sumter Braves =

- 1985–1990; Sumter, South Carolina

Minor league affiliations
- Class: Class A (1985-1990)
- League: South Atlantic League (1985–1990)

Major league affiliations
- Team: Atlanta Braves (1985-1990)

Minor league titles
- League titles: None

Team data
- Name: Sumter Braves (1985-1990)
- Ballpark: Riley Park (1985–1990)

The Sumter Braves were a minor league baseball team located in Sumter, South Carolina. The team played in the South Atlantic League, and were affiliated with the Atlanta Braves. Their home stadium was Riley Park.

== History ==
In 1984, the Anderson Braves relocated to Sumter. In 1991, the affiliate shifted to Macon, Georgia and became known as the Macon Braves, eventually becoming today's Rome Emperors of Rome, Georgia. An expansion team was awarded to Sumter right after the Sumter Braves relocated, which was known as the Sumter Flyers. Notably, 2014 Baseball Hall of Fame inductee Tom Glavine pitched for Sumter in 1985.

== The ballpark ==
Sumter teams played at Riley Park. Located at Church Street & DuBose Street, 29150. It is still in use today as home to the University of South Carolina Sumter Fire Ants and Morris College Hornet baseball teams. The Sumter Chicks (1949–1950) of the Tri-State League, Sumter Indians (1970) and Sumter Astros (1971) of the Western Carolinas League and the Sumter Braves (1985–1990) and Sumter Flyers (1991) of the South Atlantic League all played at Riley Park.

== Notable alumni ==
=== Baseball Hall of Fame alumni ===
- Tom Glavine (1985) Inducted, 2014

=== Notable alumni ===
- Shane Andrews (1991)
- Jeff Blauser (1985) 2 x MLB All-Star
- Jolbert Cabrera (1991)
- Vinny Castilla (1990) 2 x MLB All-Star
- Kevin Foster (1991)
- Ron Gant (1985, 1989) 2 x MLB All-Star
- Ryan Klesko (1989-1990) MLB All-Star
- Mark Lemke (1985)
- Al Martin (1986-1987)
- Carlos Perez (1991) MLB All-Star
- Eddie Perez (1989-1990) NLCS Most Valuable Player
- Kirk Rueter (1991)
- Brian Snitker (1986, MGR)
- Rondell White (1991) MLB All-Star
- Mark Wohlers (1989-1990) MLB All-Star
- Ned Yost (1988-1990, MGR) Manager: 2015 World Series Champion Kansas City Royals

== Year-by-year record ==
=== Sumter Braves ===
Year	Record	Finish	Manager	Playoffs
1985	72-63	6th	Buddy Bailey	Lost in 1st round
1986	77-60	3rd	Brian Snitker	
1987	75-62	3rd	Buddy Bailey	
1988	64-73	9th	Ned Yost	
1989	60-81	11th	Ned Yost	
1990	73-69	7th	Ned Yost	
