= Heaton Stadium =

Baseball field in Augusta, Georgia

- Location within Georgia Location within the United States
- Interactive map of Heaton Stadium
- Address: 78 Milledge Road; Augusta, GA 30904
- Coordinates: 33°29′42″N 82°0′2″W
- Capacity: 3,600
- Surface: Grass
- Record attendance: 6,231 (August 16, 1991)

Construction
- Built: 1988
- Opened: April 12, 1988
- Closed: September 1994

Tenants
- Augusta Pirates (SAL) 1988–1993; Augusta GreenJackets (SAL) 1994

Heaton Stadium was a baseball stadium in Augusta, Georgia, United States. It was the home field of the Augusta Pirates/Augusta GreenJackets Minor League Baseball team of the Class A South Atlantic League from 1988 to 1994. After the 1994 season the site was redeveloped as the GreenJackets' next home, Lake Olmstead Stadium.

Heaton Stadium was named for Bill Heaton, a retired Army lieutenant colonel and partner in the team ownership who worked for six years to bring a minor league club to Augusta. Heaton reportedly built the stadium with his own money, assembling bleachers bought from other locations with the help of volunteers and high school workers paid minimum wage.
