= Augusta GreenJackets =

Minor League Baseball team

- Founded in 1988 in Augusta, Georgia; Based in North Augusta, South Carolina since 2018
Team logo
Cap insignia

Minor league affiliations
- Class: Single-A (2021–present)
- Previous classes: Class A (1988–2020)
- League: Carolina League (2021–present)
- Division: South Division
- Previous leagues: South Atlantic League (1988–2020)

Major league affiliations
- Team: Atlanta Braves (2021–present)
- Previous teams: San Francisco Giants (2004–2020); Boston Red Sox (1999–2004); Pittsburgh Pirates (1988–1998)

Minor league titles
- League titles (4): 1989; 1995; 1999; 2008
- Division titles (1): 2008

Team data
- Name: Augusta GreenJackets (1994–present)
- Previous names: Augusta Pirates (1988–1993)
- Colors: Dark green, green, gold, black, white
- Mascot: Auggie
- Ballpark: SRP Park (2018–present)
- Previous parks: Lake Olmstead Stadium (1995–2017); Heaton Stadium (1988–1994)
- Owner/ Operator: Diamond Baseball Holdings
- General manager: Brandon Greene
- Manager: Brad Stoll
- Website: milb.com/augusta

The Augusta GreenJackets are a Minor League Baseball team of the Carolina League and the Single-A affiliate of the Atlanta Braves. They play their home games at SRP Park in North Augusta, South Carolina.

The team began play in 1988 as the Augusta Pirates, a member of the South Atlantic League, when the Macon Pirates relocated to Augusta, Georgia. They rebranded to the GreenJackets after the 1993 season. As a part of the 2021 reorganization of the minor leagues, the GreenJackets were moved to the Carolina League.

== History ==
After the 1987 season, the ownership of the Macon Pirates, disappointed with poor attendance, moved the team to Augusta, Georgia, where they were known as the Augusta Pirates. Augusta was a member of the South Atlantic League from 1988 to 2020. Before the San Francisco Giants took over the club's affiliation after the 2004 season, the GreenJackets were a part of the Boston Red Sox organization. Prior to that, the Red Sox replaced the Pittsburgh Pirates in Augusta. The Red Sox' relationship with Augusta met with immediate success when the GreenJackets won the South Atlantic League championship in their first year as an affiliate team.

The 2020 season was postponed and later cancelled for Augusta and all of MiLB due to the COVID-19 pandemic. In the MiLB Reorganization of 2021, the Braves invited Augusta to be their new Low-A affiliate in the Low-A East. In 2022, the Low-A East became known as the Carolina League, the name historically used by the regional circuit prior to the 2021 reorganization, and was reclassified as a Single-A circuit.

The team is named after The Masters golf tournament held across the Savannah River in Augusta, Georgia, where the winner receives a green jacket. The team logo features a yellowjacket wasp colored green, wearing a tam o' shanter cap, associated with golf.

One week a year the GreenJackets assume the name of their alter ego and become the Pimento Cheese. This name also pays homage to the Masters tournament with the iconic pimento cheese sandwich, a popular concession item sold at the tournament, featured prominently as the team's logo on caps, jerseys, and all team branding.

== Stadium ==
The GreenJackets play in SRP Park, a 4,782-seat stadium which opened on April 12, 2018. SRP Park is part of Riverside Village at Hammond's Ferry, which overlooks the Savannah River and the city of Augusta, featuring apartments, a hotel, office space, and multiple restaurants and shops. The North Augusta-based SRP Federal Credit Union purchased the naming rights to the ballpark.

SRP Park replaced Lake Olmstead Stadium as the home of the GreenJackets. Lake Olmstead Stadium was built primarily as a baseball facility between 1994 and 1995. The stadium seated 4,400 with nearly 1,000 box seats, 830 reserved seats, over 2,000 general admission seats.

== Awards ==
In 2008, the team was voted by fans as the best minor league team in the Minor League Baseball Yearly (MiLBY) Awards.

== Notable alumni ==
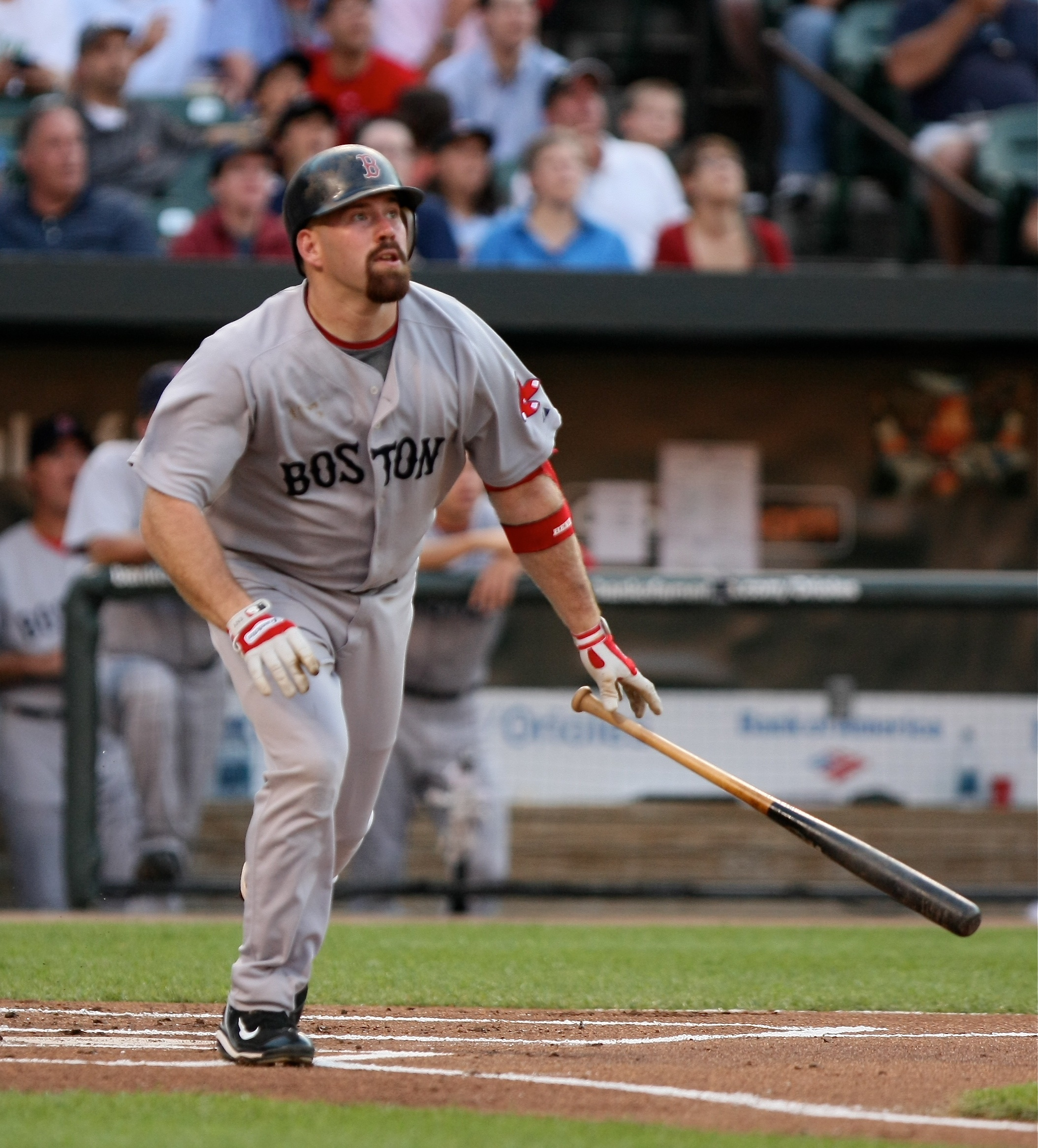
All Star Kevin Youkilis

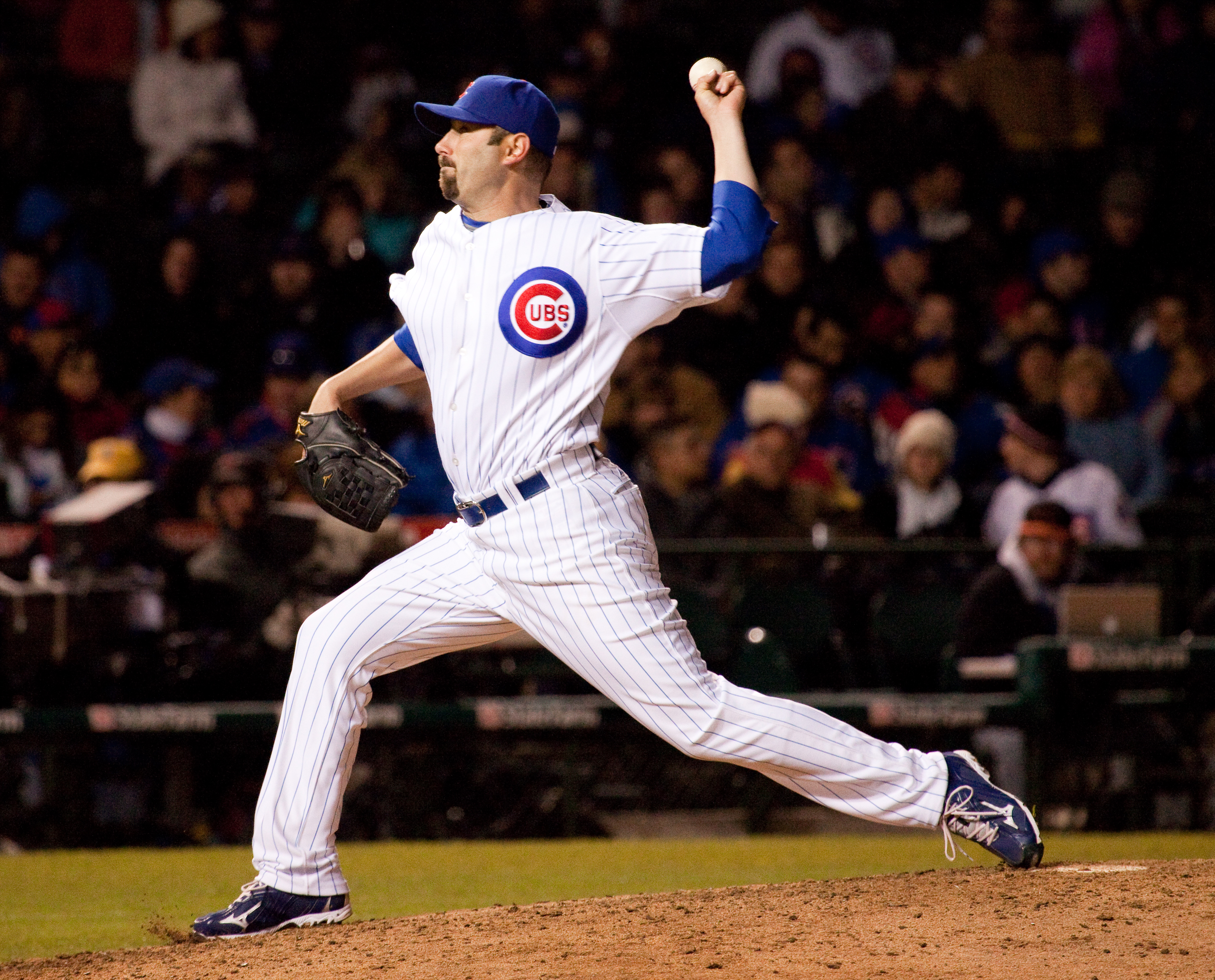
John Grabow

- Moisés Alou MLB All-Star
- Bronson Arroyo MLB All-Star
- Madison Bumgarner 4 x MLB All-Star; 2014 World Series Most Valuable Player
- Carlos García MLB All-Star
- Clint Courtney (1948)
- Fred Gladding (1958)
- Vaughn Grissom (2021)
- Brian Horwitz
- Ralph Houk (1941) Manager: 1961 & 1962 World Series Champion – New York Yankees
- Roberto Kelly (2007, MGR) 2 x MLB All-Star
- Jason Kendall (1993) 3 x MLB All-Star
- Jon Lester (2003) 4 x MLB All-Star
- Orlando Merced (1988)
- Brandon Moss (2004) MLB All-Star
- Wally Moses (1931) 2 x MLB All-Star
- Aramis Ramirez (1996) 3 x MLB All-Star
- Dustin Pedroia (2004) 4 x MLB All Star; 2007 AL Rookie of the Year; 2008 AL Most Valuable Player
- Hanley Ramírez (2003) MLB All-Star; 2009 NL Batting Title; 2006 NL Rookie of the Year
- Sergio Romo (2006) MLB All-Star
- Freddy Sanchez (2000) 3 x MLB All-Star
- Pablo Sandoval (2006) 2 x MLB All-Star; 2012 World Series Most Valuable Player
- Spencer Strider (2021)
- Brian Wilson (2005) 3 x MLB All-Star
- Tim Wakefield (1999) MLB All-Star
- Rube Walker (1962)
- Tony Womack (1992) MLB All-Star
- Kevin Youkilis (2001–2002) 3 x MLB All-Star
- Adam Duvall (2011)

== Roster ==
Augusta GreenJackets roster
Players		Coaches/Other
Pitchers: 37 Cristobal Abreu; 60 Gensi Angeles; 77 Luis Arestigueta; 28 Landon Beidelschies; 33 John Damozonio; 43 Logan Forsythe; 23 Ryan Heppner; 38 Will Holmes; 70 Wil Libbert; 48 Adiel Melendez; 52 Styven Paez; 54 Yander Pinero; 67 Lewis Sifontes; 50 Derek Vartanian; 11 Nico Wagner; 30 Kade Woods; 37 Jay Woolfolk	Catchers: 62 Manuel Dos Passos; 38 Austin Fawley; 13 Dominic Kibler; 36 Nick Montgomery; Infielders: 2 Manuel Campos; 15 Yamvier Carrero; 19 Malvin Fernandez; 39 Juan Mateo; 26 Cooper McMurray; 4 Joe Olsavsky; 46 Junior Tilien; Outfielders: 1 Parker Brosius; 16 Caleb Klein; 17 Dallas Macias; 54 Michael Martinez; 7 Caden Merritt; 24 Matt Scannell	Manager: 19 Brad Stoll; Coaches: 57 Rob Leary (coach); 27 Elvin Nina (pitching); 8 Jefferson Romero (coach); 18 Adam Wood (hitting); 60-day injured list: 12 Patrick Engskov; 16 Jaylen Paden; -- Jose Perdomo (full season); 46 Jeremy Reyes; 22 Kendy Richard; 55 Juan Sanchez; 7-day injured list; * On Atlanta Braves 40-man roster; ~ Development list; # Rehab assignment; ∞ Reserve list; ‡ Restricted list; § Suspended list; † Temporarily inactive list; Roster updated September 3, 2026; Transactions; → More rosters: MiLB • Carolina League; → Atlanta Braves minor league players
