= Lake Olmstead Stadium =

Baseball park in Augusta, Georgia, United States

- Interactive map of Lake Olmstead Stadium
- Location: 78 Milledge Road; Augusta, GA 30904
- Coordinates: 33°29′42″N 82°0′2″W
- Owner: City of Augusta
- Operator: Agon Sports and Entertainment
- Capacity: 4,822
- Surface: Grass
- Record attendance: 5,828 (May 19, 2009)
- Field size: Left Field: 330 feet Center Field: 400 feet Right Field: 330 feet

Construction
- Groundbreaking: September 7, 1994
- Opened: April 10, 1995
- Cost: $3 million ($6.34 million in 2025 dollars)
- Architect: Woodhurst Architects
- Structural engineer: Cranston Engineering Group PC
- General contractors: R. W. Allen & Associates

Tenants
- Augusta GreenJackets (SAL) 1995–2017; Augusta Jaguars (Peach Belt) 2009–2018

Lake Olmstead Stadium is a closed baseball park in Augusta, Georgia, United States. It was built between the 1994 and 1995 seasons to replace Heaton Stadium on the same site and can hold 4,822 people. The stadium also serves as an outdoor-arena style event venue.

Lake Olmstead Stadium was primarily used as the home field of the Augusta GreenJackets of the Class A South Atlantic League from 1995 to 2017, after which the GreenJackets moved to the new SRP Park across the Savannah River in North Augusta, South Carolina, in 2018.

Lake Olmstead Stadium was the home field of the Augusta University Jaguars baseball team for most of their games from 2009 to 2013 and all of their games from 2014 to 2018; however, the team elected to return to Jaguar Field on the Forest Hills campus full-time starting in the 2019 season.

== Features ==
The stadium has nearly 1,000 box seats, 830 reserved seats and over 2,500 general admission seats. In 2006, the Budweiser Party Pavilion was built down the right field line. This new area can host picnics anywhere from 20 people to as many as 500 people.

=== Improvements ===
Before the 2007 season, the Cintas Cool Zone was constructed and the Fun Zone playground area down the left-field line was revamped.

=== Future ===
With the GreenJackets' departure, the Augusta-Richmond County commission faces questions on how to utilize the ballpark. One proposal was leaving the ballpark as-is with Augusta University as the primary tenant while another proposal was to renovate the ballpark into an amphitheater. In August 2018 it was reported that the issues hadn't been resolved yet, but that, regarding the interest of Augusta University or Paine College, "it doesn't look like that's the route we're going to take." In October 2018 Recreation officials recommended to city commissioners that they do modest repairs to the facility to begin holding events, short of a full-scale renovation estimated to cost $640,000.

In 2020, the city reached an agreement with concert promoter C-4 Live to manage the stadium and cover the costs to make it a state-of-the-art outdoor venue in exchange for hosting events there for free for a limited time. The first event scheduled, a concert series during Masters Week in March 2022, was cancelled a month ahead of the event, and stadium work was stopped, citing soil instability.

As of March 2023, the stadium is unusable and the city is pursuing a lawsuit against the company they contracted with for repairs. In April 2023, the company filed a countersuit against the city. In April 2024, the city was granted a default judgement by a Richmond County judge against C-4 Live, dismissing the concert promoter's counterclaim due to their failure to retain a lawyer on court order.

Following the aftermath of Hurricane Helene in late September 2024, the stadium was opened up as a debris collection site.

== Notable events ==
Bob Dylan performed at the stadium during his 2006 North American Tour on August 17, 2006.
