= Bob Sadowski (third baseman) =

American baseball player (1937–2017)

- Third baseman
- Born: January 15, 1937; St. Louis, Missouri, U.S.
- Died: January 6, 2017 (aged 79); St. Louis, Missouri, U.S.
- Batted: Left Threw: Right

MLB debut
- September 16, 1960, for the St. Louis Cardinals

Last MLB appearance
- September 28, 1963, for the Los Angeles Angels

MLB statistics
- Batting average: .222
- Home runs: 7
- Runs batted in: 46
- Stats at Baseball Reference

Teams
- St. Louis Cardinals (1960); Philadelphia Phillies (1961); Chicago White Sox (1962); Los Angeles Angels (1963)

Robert Frank Sadowski (January 15, 1937 – January 6, 2017) was an American professional baseball player and manager. Primarily a third baseman and outfielder during his brief Major League Baseball career, he was a second baseman and shortstop coming through the minor leagues. Sadowski batted left-handed, threw right-handed, stood 6 feet (1.83 meters) tall and weighed 175 pounds (79 kilograms) during his active career. Nicknamed "Bo", Sadowski's big league career coincided somewhat with a namesake, pitcher Robert Sadowski (no relation).

Bo Sadowski signed with his hometown St. Louis Cardinals (the team that first signed pitcher Sadowski as well) in 1955 and made his debut (and only) appearance for the Redbirds on September 16, 1960, when he grounded out and walked against Stu Miller of the San Francisco Giants during a 6–2 defeat at Busch Stadium. Following the 1960 campaign, he was traded to the Philadelphia Phillies, who recalled him from the Buffalo Bisons of the Triple-A International League for a more extended 16-game trial during 1961. But Sadowski batted only .130 in 54 at bats, and was traded again the following off-season, this time in a multiple-player transaction to the Chicago White Sox.

Sadowski spent the full 1962–63 seasons in the American League. With the 1962 White Sox, he batted .231 with six home runs and 24 runs batted in in 130 at bats, but was outrighted to the ChiSox' Indianapolis Indians affiliate at season's end. He was selected in the Rule 5 draft by the Los Angeles Angels on November 26, 1962. He spent the 1963 season with the Angels where he hit .250 with a home run and 22 RBI.

Sadowski returned to the minor leagues in 1964, and played six more years, almost exclusively at the Triple-A level, for several organizations. As a major leaguer, Sadowski batted .222 with 73 hits, including nine doubles, three triples, seven homers and 46 RBI. However, he was a solid .267 hitter in almost 1,400 games played as a minor leaguer. Following his playing career, he spent one season, 1972, as a manager at the Class A level in the Minnesota Twins' farm system for the Charlotte Twins.

Sadowski died in January 2017 at the age of 79.
