= Riley Park (Sumter) =

Stadium in Sumter, South Carolina, US

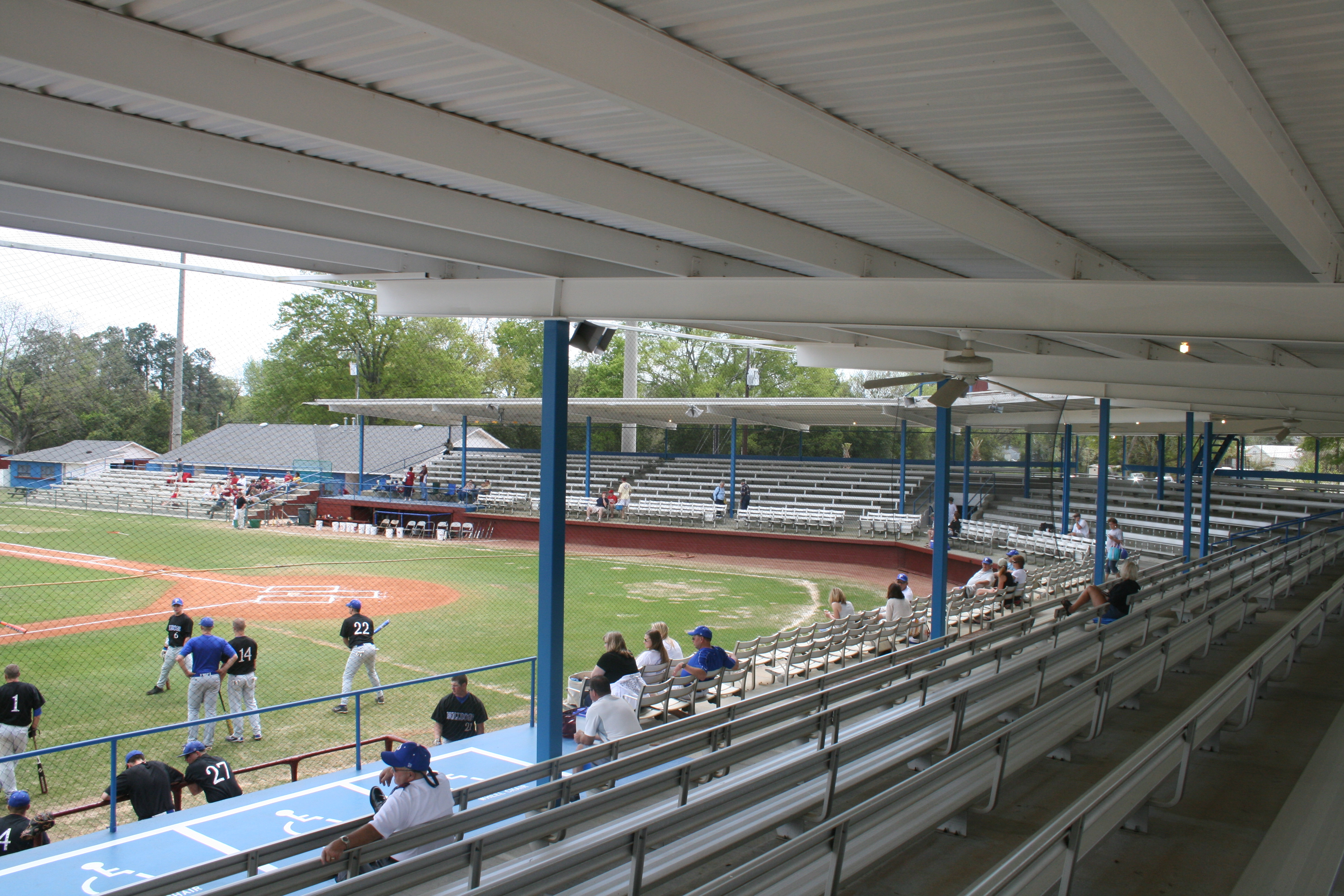
- Interactive map of Riley Park
- Location: North Church Street at DuBose Street 29150, Sumter, South Carolina
- Coordinates: 33.934891°N 80.345673°W
- Owner: City of Sumter
- Operator: City of Sumter
- Capacity: 2,000

Construction
- Opened: 1934

Tenants
- Sumter P-15's (ALB); USC Sumter Fire Ants (NJCAA); Morris College Hornets (NAIA); Minor League Baseball; Sumter Chicks (TSL) (1949-1950); Sumter Indians (WCL) (1970); Sumter Astros (WCL) (1971); Sumter Braves (SAL) (1985-1990); Sumter Flyers (SAL) (1991)

Riley Park is a stadium in Sumter, South Carolina, located at Church Street & DuBose Street, 29150. It is primarily used for baseball, has housed Sumter minor league baseball teams and is currently home to the University of South Carolina Sumter Fire Ants and Morris College Hornet baseball teams.

== History ==
Riley Park was the home to various Sumter minor league baseball teams from 1949–1991. The Sumter Chicks (1949-1950) of the Tri-State League, Sumter Indians (1970) and Sumter Astros (1971) of the Western Carolinas League and the Sumter Braves (1985-1990) and Sumter Flyers (1991) of the South Atlantic League all played at Riley Park.

Today, Riley Park is a newly renovated 2,000-seat stadium offering concessions and ample spectator space. The stadium is used for American Legion Baseball and collegiate baseball. It is home of the American Legion P-15's team. On the collegiate level, it hosts both the University of South Carolina Sumter Fire Ants and Morris College Hornet baseball teams.
