= Monroe Pirates =

- 1971; Monroe, North Carolina

Minor league affiliations
- Class: Class A (1979)
- League: Western Carolinas League (1979)

Major league affiliations
- Team: Pittsburgh Pirates (1979)

Team data
- Name: Monroe Pirates (1979)

The Monroe Pirates were a minor league baseball team, based in Monroe, North Carolina, in 1971. The team was the city's second team in the Western Carolinas League, after the Monroe Indians left for Sumter, South Carolina in 1970. The club was a class-A affiliate of the Pittsburgh Pirates and went on to produce the notable major league careers, of Dave Parker, Ed Ott, Tony Armas and Mario Mendoza.

== 1971 season ==
Year	Record	Finish	Manager	Playoffs
1971	44-77	6th	Tom Saffell	N/A
