= Statesville/Monroe Indians =

- (1969); Monroe, North Carolina Statesville, North Carolina

Minor league affiliations
- Previous classes: Class A
- Previous leagues: Western Carolinas League

Major league affiliations
- Previous teams: Cleveland Indians

Team data
- Previous names: Monroe Indians (after June 20); Statesville Indians (before June 20)

The Statesville/Monroe Indians was a Minor League Baseball club that played in the Western Carolinas League during the 1969 season. They were a Class A affiliate of the Cleveland Indians, and were managed by former big leaguer Pinky May.

Based originally in Statesville, North Carolina, the Statesville Indians moved to the nearby city of Monroe on June 20, 1969 and finished the year as the Monroe Indians, during what turned out to be the first appearance of an organized baseball team based in Monroe.

The Cleveland Indians' affiliate finished tied for third place in the six-team league at 61-63. After that, the team moved to Sumter, South Carolina to become the Sumter Indians for the 1970 season .

== MLB alumni ==
- Mark Ballinger
- Rob Belloir
- Ed Farmer
- Larry Johnson
- Tom Kelley

== Other sources ==
- Johnson, Lloyd; Wolff, Miles (2007). The Encyclopedia of Minor League Baseball. Baseball America. ISBN 978-0-96-371898-3
