= Charlotte Twins =

- 1972; Charlotte, North Carolina

Minor league affiliations
- Class: Class A (1972)
- League: Western Carolinas League (1972)

Major league affiliations
- Team: Minnesota Twins (1972)

Minor league titles
- League titles (0): None
- Wild card berths (0): None

Team data
- Name: Charlotte Twins (1972)
- Ballpark: Clark Griffith Park (1972)

The Charlotte Twins were a minor league baseball team based in Charlotte, North Carolina.

In 1972, the Charlotte "Twins" were a minor league affiliate of the Minnesota Twins and played as members of the Class A level Western Carolinas League, placing fifth in the league standings.

In their only season of minor league play, the Twins hosted minor league home games at Clark Griffith Park, uniquely sharing the ballpark with the Charlotte Hornets of the Class AA level Southern League, also a Minnesota Twins affiliate.

== History ==
On January 14, 1972, a Charlotte franchise entered the Class A level Western Carolinas League as the city's second minor league team. The new Twins franchise was part of an unusual arrangement that saw the Minnesota Twins operate two affiliate teams simultaneously out of Charlotte’s Clark Griffith Park. Both teams were owned and operated by the Twins and their owner Calvin Griffith. The Charlotte Hornets of the Class AA level Southern League had begun minor league play in the league in 1937 when the Twins were still the Washington Senators, after being founded in 1892. 1972 proved to be the final year for both teams in Charlotte.

The Charlotte "Twins" became members of the six–team, Class A level Western Carolinas League, as the Anderson Giants, Gastonia Pirates, Greenville Rangers, Greenwood Braves and Spartanburg Phillies joined Charlotte in beginning league play on April 14, 1972.

On opening day of April 15, 1972, Charlotte hosted both affiliate teams in their home openers. First, the Charlotte Twins hosted the Gastonia Pirates at 6:30 PM in the Western Carolina League season opener, followed by the Charlotte Hornets against the Montgomery Rebels in the Southern League second game. For the rest of the season, the two teams played home games at Clark Griffith Park while the other team was on the road.

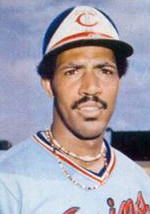
(1977) Lyman Bostock. Minnesota Twins. Bostock played for the Charlotte Twins in his first professional season. Bostock was murdered in 1978.

In their only season of play, the Twins placed fifth in the 1972 Western Carolinas League standings. The Twins ended the regular season with a record of 50–79, finishing 37.5 games behind the first place Spartanburg Phillies. Bob Sadowski served as manager. The Twins did not qualify for the playoff in the only season of play for the Class A Charlotte franchise.

In the final standings, Spartanburg (89–43) led the Western Carolinas League, followed by the Greenville Rangers (71–57), Greenwood Braves (70–61), Gastonia Pirates (60–70), Charlotte Twins (50–79) and Anderson Giants (51–81) in the Western Carolinas League standings. Spartanburg then defeated Greenville in a playoff to claim the championship.

Charlotte Twins players Lyman Bostock and Rob Wilfong both went on to major league careers.

Bostock, who played his first professional season for Charlotte after being drafted from California State University, Northridge, was the son of former negro leagues player Lyman Bostock Sr.. On September 23, 1978, Bostock was shot to death in Gary, Indiana. As member of the California Angels, Bostock was murdered after playing in a game at the Chicago White Sox earlier in the day.

In September 1972, the Minnesota Twins announced that both the Twins and the Hornets would not play in Charlotte in 1973. After the 1972 season, the Minnesota Twins folded the Charlotte Twins franchise and relocated the Charlotte Hornets franchise. The Hornets moved to become the Orlando Twins, continuing play in the 1973 Southern League. In 1976, the Charlotte O's franchise rejoined the Southern League and resumed play at Clark Griffith Park.

== The ballpark ==
The Charlotte Twins hosted 1972 home minor league home games at Clark Griffith Park. The ballpark was constructed in 1941 and was later renamed as Jim Crockett Memorial Park and Knights Park. The ballpark hosted minor league baseball until the 1988 Charlotte Knights last played in the park after it was nearly destroyed by fire in 1985, reducing seating from 10,000 to 3,000. The ballpark was located at 400 Magnolia Avenue (Magnolia & Lyndhurst Avenue). The site today is residential.

== Year–by–year record ==
Year	Record	Finish	Manager	Attend	Playoffs
1948	50–79	5th	Bob Sadowski	13,835	Did not qualify

== Notable alumni ==
- Lyman Bostock (1972)
- Steve Hertz (1972)
- Bob Sadowski (1972, MGR)
- Rob Wilfong (1972)

== See also ==
- Charlotte Twins players
