= Rock Hill Chiefs =

- 1947–1955; (1908, 1947–1955); Rock Hill, South Carolina

Minor league affiliations
- Class: Class D (1908); Class B(1947–1955)
- League: South Carolina League (1908); Tri-State League (1947–1955)

Major league affiliations
- Team: Chicago Cubs (1950–1951); Washington Senators (1954)

Minor league titles
- League titles (1): 1950

Team data
- Name: Rock Hill Catawabas (1908); Rock Hill Chiefs (1947–1955)
- Ballpark: Municipal Stadium (1947–1955)

The Rock Hill Chiefs were a minor league baseball team based in Rock Hill, South Carolina, USA between 1947 and 1955. The Rock Hill "Chiefs" teams played as members of the Class D level Tri-State League, winning the 1950 league championship

The Rock Hill Chiefs played as a minor league affiliate of the Chicago Cubs (1950–1951) and Washington Senators (1954).

== History ==
The Rock Hill Catawabas played as members of the Class D level South Carolina League in 1908. The Rock Hill Chiefs then played as members of the Class B level Tri-State League from 1947 to 1955. The Rock Hill Wrens (1963), Rock Hill Cardinals (1964–1966) and Rock Hill Indians teams (1967–1968) played as members of the Class A level Western Carolinas League.

The Rock Hill Chiefs teams were an affiliate of the Chicago Cubs in 1950 and 1951 and Washington Senators in 1954.

The Rock Hill Chiefs won the 1950 Tri-State League Championship, playing as an affiliate of the Chicago Cubs. After placing fourth in the regular season standings with a 73–69 record, 13.5 games behind the first place Knoxville Smokies, the Chiefs qualified for the playoffs. In the playoffs, Rock Hill swept Knoxville in three games. In the Finals, Rock Hill defeated the Asheville Tourists 4 games to 3 to capture the 1950 championship, playing the season under manager Dick Bouknight.

The Rock Hill Chiefs were succeeded by the Rock Hill Cardinals franchise. The Cardinals had Baseball Hall of Fame members Steve Carlton and Sparky Anderson

The Rock Hill teams folded after the 1968 season and minor league baseball has not returned to Rock Hill, South Carolina.

== The ballpark ==
Rock Hill Chiefs teams played minor league home games at American Legion Municipal Stadium. American Legion Municipal Stadium had a capacity of 6,800 in 1949, with dimensions of 301–406–330. Municipal Stadium was demolished in 1984. The ballpark was located at the corner of York Avenue & Cherry Road, Rock Hill, South Carolina.

== Timeline ==
Year(s)	# Yrs.	Team	Level	League	Affiliate	Ballpark
1908	1	Rock Hill Catawabas	Class D	South Carolina League	None	Unknown
1947–1949	3	Rock Hill Chiefs	Class B	Tri-State League	None	Municipal Stadium
1950–1951	2	Rock Hill Chiefs	Class B	Tri-State League	Chicago Cubs	Municipal Stadium
1952–1953	2	Rock Hill Chiefs	Class B	Tri-State League	None	Municipal Stadium
1954	1	Rock Hill Chiefs	Class B	Tri-State League	Washington Senators	Municipal Stadium
1955	1	Rock Hill Chiefs	Class B	Tri-State League	None	Municipal Stadium

== Notable alumni ==
- Jake Early (1954) MLB All-Star
- Kirby Higbe (1953) 2x MLB All-Star
- William D. Mullins (1954)
- Dusty Rhodes (1950–1951)
- Muscle Shoals (1952)

== See also ==
- Rock Hill Chiefs players
