= Sumter Flyers =

- 1991; Sumter, South Carolina

Minor league affiliations
- Class: Class A (1991)
- League: South Atlantic League (1991)

Major league affiliations
- Team: Montreal Expos (1991)

Minor league titles
- League titles: none

Team data
- Name: Sumter Flyers (1991)
- Colors: Red, gold, white
- Ballpark: Riley Park (1991)

The Sumter Flyers were a minor league baseball team in Sumter, South Carolina who played in the 1991 season. They were a Class A team in the South Atlantic League and a farm team of the Montreal Expos.

The Flyers played their home games at Riley Park. After the 1991 season, they relocated to Albany, Georgia and became the Albany Polecats.

== History ==
After the 1990 season, the Sumter Braves relocated to Macon, Georgia and became the Macon Braves. The South Atlantic League was required to expand due to its contract with Major League Baseball, and in January of 1991 placed expansion teams in Columbus, Georgia and in Sumter. The owner of the new Sumter franchise, who also owned the Quad Cities Angels, Tucson Toros, and Chattanooga Lookouts, intended to keep the team in the city for just one year before moving it to Montgomery, Alabama.

The team was originally named the Sumter Rebels, but the team changed it to the Sumter Flyers after less than two weeks due to poor community feedback. The new name was chosen in honor of both nearby Shaw Air Force Base and troops deployed to the Middle East for the then-ongoing Operation Desert Storm.

The Flyers had a record of 64-75 in their only season in Sumter. The team set a single-season attendance record for Riley Park by drawing 45,637 fans, but this was not enough for the team to break even, with the general manager describing the Flyers' monetary losses as "quite substantial".

After the 1991 season, once a deal to move the team to Montgomery fell through, the Flyers moved to Albany, Georgia and became the Albany Polecats. As of 2025, the franchise is located in Salisbury, Maryland and is named the Delmarva Shorebirds.

== Year-by-year record ==
Year	Division	W–L	Place	Manager	Postseason	Attendance	Source
Sumter Flyers
1991	Northern	64–75	10th	Lorenzo Bundy	none	45,639	
