= Orangeburg Dodgers =

Minor league baseball team from Orangeburg, South Carolina

- 1973–1974; Orangeburg, South Carolina

Minor league affiliations
- Previous classes: Class-A
- League: Western Carolinas League
- Previous leagues: South Carolina League (1906-1908)

Major league affiliations
- Previous teams: Los Angeles Dodgers (1974)

Team data
- Previous names: Orangeburg Dodgers (1974); Orangeburg Cardinals (1973); Orangeburg Cotton Pickers (1906-1908)

The Orangeburg Dodgers were a minor league baseball team based in Orangeburg, South Carolina that played in the Class-A Western Carolinas League in 1974. They were an affiliate of the Los Angeles Dodgers, and finished in 4th place with a 63-71 record in their single season of play. Four of their players went on to play in the major leagues, most notably, Pedro Guerrero. They were managed by Bart Shirley.

The team had played in 1973 as the Orangeburg Cardinals, a co-op team featuring players from multiple franchises. Randy Poffo played for the Cardinals in 1973, but later stepped away from baseball and gained fame as the professional wrestler "Macho Man" Randy Savage. Former major league star Jimmy Piersall guided the club to a 50-72 record.

The first Orangeburg team was the Orangeburg Cotton Pickers, who played as members of the South Carolina League from 1906 to 1908.
