= Kannapolis Towelers =

- 1936–1941; Kannapolis, North Carolina

Minor league affiliations
- Class: Independent (1936–1938); Class D (1939–1941)
- League: Carolina League (1936–1938); North Carolina State League (1939–1941)

Major league affiliations
- Team: None

Minor league titles
- League titles (0): None
- Conference titles (3): 1937; 1940; 1941
- Wild card berths (1): 1936

Team data
- Name: Kannapolis Towelers (1936–1941)
- Ballpark: Kannapolis Ballpark (1939–1941)

The Kannapolis Towelers were a minor league baseball team based in Kannapolis, North Carolina. From 1936 to 1941, the Towelers played as a member of the independent Carolina League from 1936 to 1938 and the Class D level North Carolina State League from 1939 to 1941, winning league pennants in 1937, 1939 and 1940.

The Kannapolis Towelers teams hosted minor league home games at the Kannapolis Ballpark.

== History ==
In 1935, the Kannapolis Towlers played the season as members of the semi–professional Carolina Textile League.

=== 1936 to 1938: Carolina League ===
In 1936, the Kannapolis Towelers began minor league play. The Kannapolis franchise became members of the eight–team Independent level Carolina League, formally called the Carolina Baseball League. The Independent league was nicknamed as an "outlaw" league because of the Independent status. Most of the other league members had previously hosted numerous teams in the Carolina Textile League, made up of locals and mill workers, with four professional players allowed per team.

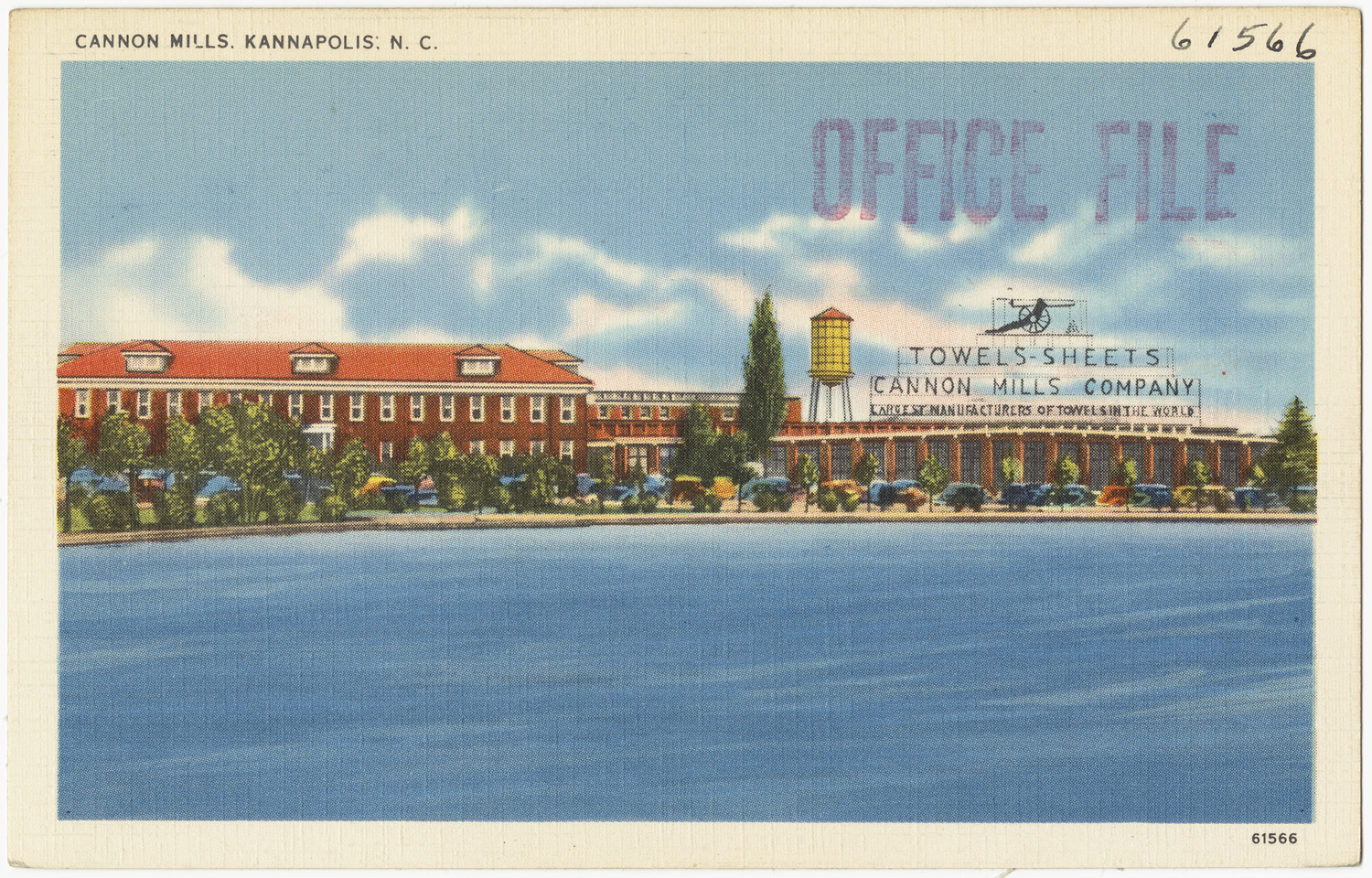
(1935) Cannon Mills Corporation. Kannapolis, North Carolina

The Kannapolis use of the "Towelers" moniker corresponds to local industry in the era. The Cannon Mills Corporation was headquartered in Kannapolis, North Carolina and was reportedly once the world's largest manufacturer of towels and sheets.

In their first season of Carolina League play, the Kannapolis Towelers ended the 1936 season in third place. With a record of 59–40 under manager Herbert Watts, the Towelers finished 7.0 games behind the first place Concord Weavers in the final regular season standings. In the first round of the playoffs, Concord defeated Kannapolis 3 games to 2.

The 1937 Kannapolis Towelers won the Carolina League pennant. Kannapolis finished the regular season with a record of 57–42 to place first, playing the season under returning manager Herbert Watts, finishing 2.5 games ahead of the second place Concord Weavers. In the first round of the playoffs, Kannapolis defeated the Hickory Rebels 3 games to 2. Kannapolis lost to Concord in the playoffs, being swept in 4 games.

The Kannapolis Towelers placed third in their final season of Carolina League play. In the six–team league, Kannapolis ended the 1938 season with a 49–47 record, playing under manager Buck Redfern. Kannapolis finished 4.0 games behind the first place Lenoir Indians in the final standings. No playoffs were held. The Carolina League folded following the 1938 season, later resuming play in 1945.

=== 1939 to 1941: North Carolina League ===
Kannapolis switched minor league baseball leagues in 1939. The Kannapolis Towelers continued play and became members of the eight–team Class D level North Carolina State League in 1939, joining the league along with the Concord Weavers franchise. The Kannapolis and Concord teams joined the North Carolina State League to replace the Gastonia Cardinals and Newton-Conover Twins, who had moved to the new Tar Heel League. The Cooleemee Cools, Landis Sens, Lexington Indians, Mooresville Moors, Salisbury Giants and Thomasville Tommies joined the two new members in 1939 North Carolina State League play.

In their first season of North Carolina State League play, the 1939 Towelers placed seventh and missed the playoffs. Kannapolis ended the season with a record of 46–65, playing under managers Phil Lundeen, L.B. Jones, Herbert Watts and Stumpy Culbreth. Kannapolis finished 26.0 games behind the first place Mooresville Moors in the final standings.

The 1940 Kannapolis Towelers won the North Carolina League pennant. The Towelers ended the 1940 regular season with a record of 67–45, playing under managers Stumpy Culbreth and Joe Palmisano. The Towelers were 2.0 games ahead of the second place Salisbury Giants in the final regular season standings. In the first round of the playoffs, Lexington defeated Kannapolis 3 games to 0. Pitcher James White of Kannapolis led the league with a 1.85 ERA and Kannapolis teammate Lew Davis scored 100 runs to lead the league.

In their final season of play, the 1941 Kannapolis Towelers won their second consecutive North Carolina State League pennant. Kannapolis ended the regular season 40 games over .500, finishing with a record of 70–30 under returning manager Joe Palmisano. The Towelers finished 8.0 games ahead of the second place Salisbury Giants in the eight–team league. Kannapolis lost in first round the playoffs, as the Mooresville Moors defeated Kannapolis 3 games to 1. The Towlers' James White led the league with 20 wins and 192 strikeouts, while Bill Carrier had 88 RBI to lead the league and Lewis Davis scored a league leading 102 runs. Despite their on–field success, the Kannapolis franchise folded following the 1941 season, replaced by the Hickory Rebels in the 1942 North Carolina State League. Because of World War II, the North Carolina State League stopped play after the 1942 season before resuming in 1945.

Kannapolis North Carolina was without minor league baseball until the city hosted the 1995 Piedmont Phillies, who played as members of the South Atlantic League. Today, Kannapolis hosts the Kannapolis Cannon Ballers, who play as members of the Carolina League.

== The ballpark ==
Beginning in 1939, the Kannapolis Towelers teams were noted to have played home minor league games at the Kannapolis Ball Park. The ballpark was reportedly located at Bell Street & Leonard Avenue in Kannapolis, North Carolina. Today, the ballpark site is residential.

== Timeline ==
| Year(s) | # Yrs. | Team | Level | League |
|---|---|---|---|---|
| 1936–1938 | 3 | Kannapolis Towelers | Independent | Carolina League |
| 1939–1941 | 3 | Kannapolis Towelers | Class D | North Carolina State League |

== Year–by–year records ==
| Year | Record | Finish | Manager | Playoffs/Notes |
|---|---|---|---|---|
| 1936 | 59–40 | 3rd | Ginger Watts | Lost in 1st round |
| 1937 | 67–45 | 1st | Ginger Watts | Won pennant Lost in Finals |
| 1938 | 49–47 | 3rd | Buck Redfern | No playoffs held |
| 1939 | 46–65 | 7th | Phil Lundeen / L.B. Jones; Herbert Watts / Stumpy Culbreth | Did not qualify |
| 1940 | 67–45 | 1st | Stumpy Culbreth / Joe Palmisano | Won pennant Lost in 1st round |
| 1941 | 70–30 | 1st | Joe Palmisano | Won pennant Lost in 1st round |

== Notable alumni ==
- Vince Barton (1937)
- Fred Bennett (1939)
- Leon Culberson (1940)
- Joe Palmisano (1940–1941, MGR)
- Buck Ross (1935)
- Eric Tipton (1938)
- Kannapolis Towelers players
