= Albemarle Rockets =

- 1948; Albemarle, North Carolina

Minor league affiliations
- Class: Class D (1948)
- League: North Carolina State League (1948)

Major league affiliations
- Team: None

Minor league titles
- League titles (0): None

Team data
- Name: Albemarle Rockets (1948)
- Ballpark: Morton Park (1948)

The Albemarle Rockets were a minor league baseball teams based in Albemarle, North Carolina. In 1948, the Rockets played as members of the Class D level North Carolina State League, hosting home games at Morton Park.

== History ==
Before the 1948 season, the Landis Millers minor league franchise of the North Carolina State League moved to Albemarle, North Carolina. The move reportedly occurred because the Landis team, owned by P.K. Drye, was building a new ballpark and construction wasn’t complete in time to begin the 1948 season in Landis.

The Albemarle Rockets first began minor league play in 1948 after the Landis franchise relocated. Albemarle became members of the eight–team Class D level North Carolina State League. The Rockets joined the Concord Weavers, Hickory Rebels, High Point-Thomasville Hi-Toms, Lexington Indians, Mooresville Moors, Salisbury Pirates and Statesville Owls teams league play. North Carolina State League play began its schedule with opening day games on April 30, 1948.

The 1948 Albemarle Rockets finished last in the North Carolina State League final standings. Albemarle did not qualify for the playoffs, eventually won by the Statesville Owls. The Rockets ended the regular season with a record of 32–78, placing eighth in the eight–team league, playing under managers Stankley Brown, James Miller and George Motto. Albemarle finished 35.5 games behind the first place High Point-Thomasville Hi-Toms in the final regular season standings. The High Point-Thomasville team (67–43), Statesville Owls (63–47), Hickory Rebels (61–49), Lexington Indians (59–50), Mooresville Moors (57–52), Salisbury Pirates (51–53) and Concord Weavers (44–62) finished ahead of Albemarle in the final regular standings.

The Albemarle Rockets played home games at Morton Ballpark, where season attendance was 28,025, an average of 510 per game. The Rockets relocated back to Landis following the 1948 season.

In 1949, the franchise moved back to Landis, North Carolina and became the Landis Spinners. Without a minor league team, Morton Park was utilized by American Legion teams through the 1960's.

Albemarle, North Carolina has not hosted another minor league team.

== The ballpark ==
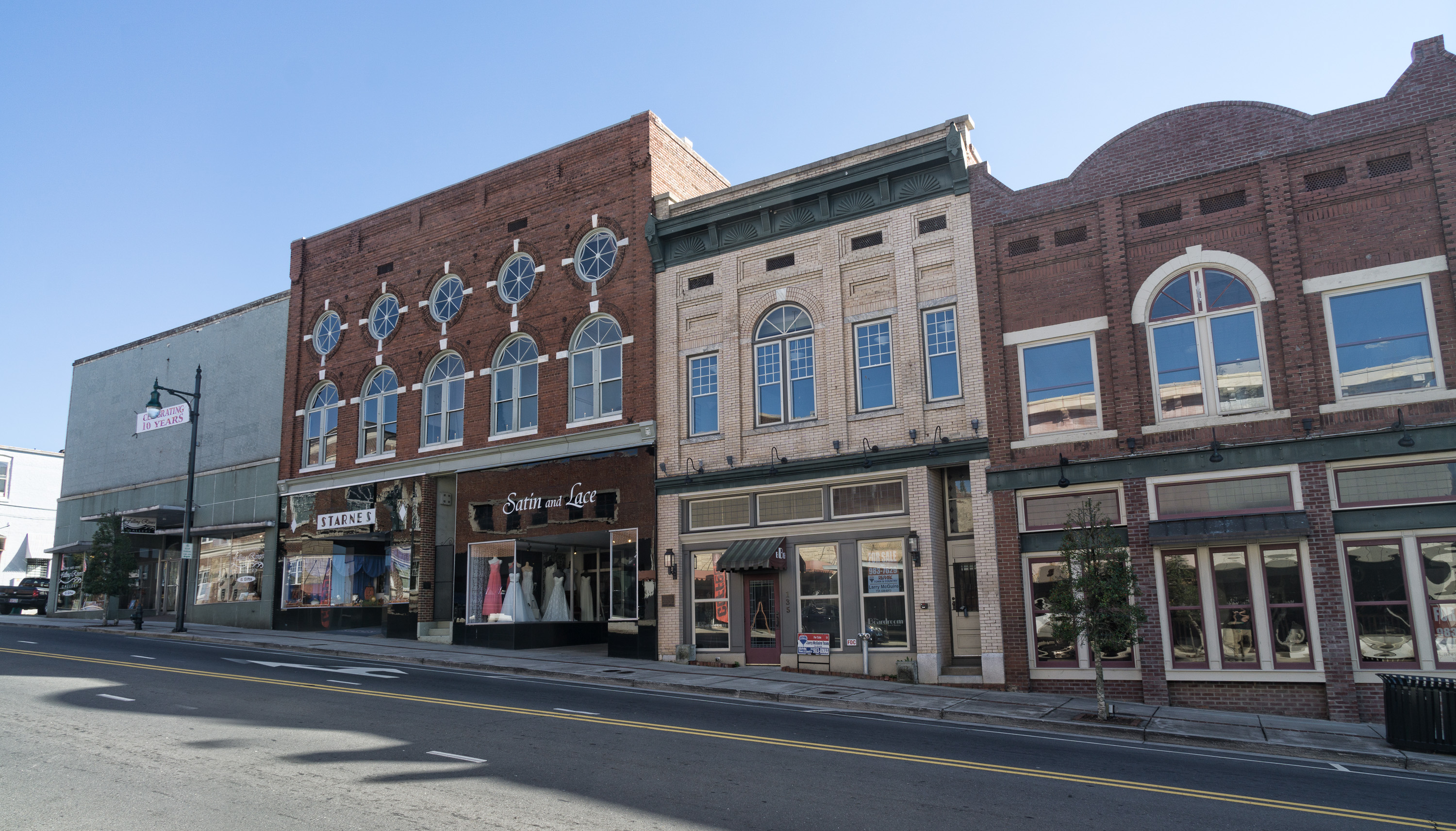
(2017) Downtown Historic District. National Register of Historic Places, Albemarle, North Carolina.

The Albemarle Rockets played home minor league games at Morton Park. Reportedly the ballpark was built in 1947 by brothers Clarence and Charlie Morton at a cost of $45,000, including a $14,000 lighting system. The new ballpark also had dressing rooms, showers, a press box and seating for 500 fans, with a cement block outfield wall. Admission to Rockets home games was said to have been .60 cents for adults and .25 cents for children. The ballpark was noted to have been located east of Albemarle on Highway 24/27/73.

== Year–by–year record ==
Year	Record	Finish	Manager	Playoffs/Notes
1948	32–78	8th	Stankley Brown / James Miller / George Motto	Did not qualify

== Notable alumni ==
No alumni of the Albemarle Rockets advanced to the major leagues.
