= Mooresville Moors =

- 1936–1953; (1936–1942, 1945–1953); Mooresville, North Carolina

Minor league affiliations
- Class: Independent (1936); Class D (1937–1942, 1945–1953)
- League: Carolina League (1936); North Carolina State League (1937–1942, 1945–1952); Tar Heel League (1953)

Major league affiliations
- Team: Boston Braves (1945)

Minor league titles
- League titles (6): 1937; 1938; 1939; 1946; 1947; 1952
- Wild card berths (8): 1938; 1940; 1941; 1942; 1946; 1949; 1950; 1952

Team data
- Name: Mooresville Moors (1936–1942); Mooresville Braves (1945); Mooresville Moors (1946–1953)
- Ballpark: Mooresville Park (1936–1942, 1945–1953)

The Mooresville Moors were a minor league baseball team based in Mooresville, North Carolina. Between 1936 and 1953, the Mooresville Moors teams played as members of the 1936 Carolina League, the North Carolina State League from 1937 to 1942 and 1945 to 1952 before playing a final season in the 1953 Tar Heel League. The Mooresville Moors won six North Carolina State League championships.

For one season, the team became known as the Mooresville "Braves," playing the 1945 season as a minor league affiliate of the Boston Braves.

The Moors and Braves hosted minor league home games at Mooresville Park.

Baseball Hall of Fame member Hoyt Wilhelm played for the 1942, 1946 and 1947 Mooresville Moors.

== History ==
=== Carolina League (1936) ===
The Mooresville Moors first began minor league play in 1936. The Salisbury Colonials were 2–6 in the first season of the Independent level Carolina League when the franchise moved to Mooresville, North Carolina. Mooresville, North Carolina was awarded the franchise after agreeing to buy the team equipment and honor player contracts. Beginning play at Mooresville Park, the Salisbury/Mooresville team ended the 1936 season with an overall record of 35–64 under manager Jim Poole, placing seventh in the eight–team Carolina League standings. Salisbury originally surrendered its franchise to the league on May 18, 1936.

The Mooresville "Moors" corresponds with local agriculture and industry. The Moor brand Turkish towel was a featured product of local Mooresville cotton mills.

=== North Carolina League (1937–1942) ===
After one season of play, the Mooresville Moors left the Carolina League and joined the eight–team Class D level North Carolina State League in 1937. The 1937 Mooresville Moors won the first of six championships. The Moors became charter members of the North Carolina State League, playing home games at Mooresville Park. Mooresville had a 1937 regular season record of 74–35 to place first in the North Carolina State League regular season standings, capturing the pennant under returning manager Jim Poole and president C.F Clark, as the Moors finished 12.0 games ahead of the second place Thomasville Chair Makers. In the Playoffs, the Mooresville Moors defeated the Landis Sens 3 games to 1. In the Finals, Mooresville defeated the Shelby Cardinals 4 games to 3 to capture the 1937 North Carolina State League Championship. Moors pitcher Joe Rucidio led the league with 20 wins. Mooresville native Tripp Sigman played for the 1937 Moors.

The Mooresville Moors were co–champions of the 1938 North Carolina State League. The Moors the ended the 1938 regular season with a record of 59–53, placing fourth under manager John Hicks, finishing 16.5 games behind the first place Thomasville Tommies. In the Playoffs, Mooresville defeated the Shelby/Gastonia Cardinals 3 games to 0. In the Finals, the Mooresville Moors and Thomasville Tommies were tied 3 games to 3. In the 7th game on September 18, 1938, the game was abandoned due to fan violence in Thomasville. Mooresville and Thomasville were declared co–champions.

The 1939 Mooresville Moors were North Carolina State League Champions for the third straight season. In the regular season, the Moors won the league Pennant, ending the 1939 season with a record of 71–38, placing first in the North Carolina State League standings under returning manager John Hicks, finishing 7.5 games ahead of the second place Lexington Indians. In the Playoffs, the Moors defeated the Concord Weavers 3 games to 1. In the Finals the Mooresville Moors again played the Thomasville Tommies, winning 4 games to 1. Moors player William Carrier led the league with 92 RBI and teammate Webster Templeton led with 100 runs scored. Pitcher Richard Robinson won 23 games to lead the league. Playing at Mooresville Park, season attendance was 20,093, an average of 369 per game.

The Mooresville Moors placed fourth in the 1940 North Carolina State League regular season standings and advanced to the league Finals. With a regular season record of 60–51 under manager John Hicks. Finishing 4.5 games behind the first place Kannapolis Towelers, Mooresville qualified for the playoffs. In the Playoffs, the Mooresville Moors swept the Salisbury Giants in 3 games. In the Finals, the Lexington Indians won the title, defeating Mooresville 4 games to 1. Mooresville's Norm Small led the North Carolina State League with both 25 home runs and 115 RBI.

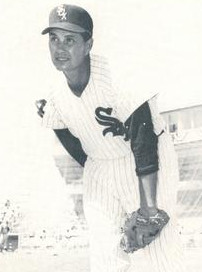
(1965) Baseball Hall of Fame member, Hoyt Wilhelm, Chicago White Sox. Wilhelm began his professional career with Mooresville and was tied to the team from 1941 to 1947.

On May 28, 1941, the Moors released future Baseball Hall of Fame member Hoyt Wilhelm, who had not appeared in a game after signing with the team on May 7, 1941, just four days out of high school. Wilhelm would return to the Moors for three seasons of play, beginning in 1942.

The 1941 Mooresville Moors again advanced to the North Carolina State League finals. The Moors ended the 1941 regular season with a record of 57–43, placing third in the league standings under manager Ginger Watts, finishing 13.0 games behind the first place Kannapolis Towelers. The Mooresville Moors defeated the Kannapolis Towelers 3 games to 1 in the playoffs to advance. In the Finals, the Salisbury Giants and Mooresville Moors series went to seven games, with Salisbury winning the championship.

The Moors finished in a tie for second place in the 1942 North Carolina State League regular season, with a future Baseball Hall of Fame pitcher on the roster. Mooresville ended the season with a record of 61–39 record under John Hicks, who returned, as Mooresville finished 4.0 games behind the first place Concord Weavers in the regular season. In the Playoffs, the Landis Senators swept Mooresville in three games. At age 19, Baseball Hall of Fame member Hoyt Wilhelm pitched the first of his three seasons for Mooresville in 1942, finishing with a 10–3 record and a 4.25 ERA. After the 1942 season, the North Carolina State League suspended play due to World War II. Norm Small again led the North Carolina State League with both 32 home runs and 107 RBI. Mooresville pitcher Harry Jordan had 179 strikeouts to lead the league.

=== North Carolina League (1945–1952) ===
Mooresville returned to play in the 1945 North Carolina State League. The Mooresville Braves became a minor league affiliate of the Boston Braves for one season. Upon returning to North Carolina State League play, the Braves ended the 1945 season with a record of 51–61, placing sixth in the standings, finishing 28.0 games behind the first place Hickory Rebels. Jack Quinlan was the 1945 manager. Braves pitcher Forrest Thompson led the league with 24 wins, a 2.13 ERA and 278 strikeouts.

The franchise returned to the Mooresville "Moors" moniker in 1946 and captured the North Carolina State League championship. The Moors finished the 1946 season with a 57–52, record, placing fourth in the regular season standings. The Moors finished 19.0 games behind the first place Concord Weavers in the regular season, playing under managers Robert Crow and Norm Small. In the playoffs, Mooresville defeated the Landis Millers 4 games to 3 to advance. In the Finals the Mooresville Moors won the championship by defeating the Concord Weavers 4 games to 2. Player/manager Norm Small led the league with both 18 home runs and 100 runs scored, while Moors pitcher Lacy James led the league with 247 strikeouts.

Hoyt Wilhelm returned to Mooresville in 1946, pitching to a 21–8 record with a 2.47 ERA. Wilhelm returned after serving in the Army during World War II and earning the Purple Heart. He had been injured, with shrapnel permanently embedded in his back.

Mooresville won another North Carolina State League pennant and league championship in 1947. The Moors captured the pennant as Mooresville finished the regular season with a record of 68–43, placing first in the league standings, finishing 4.5 games ahead of the second place Salisbury Pirates, as player/manager Norm Small led the league with 31 home runs. In the playoffs, Mooresville defeated the Hickory Rebels 4 games to 3 to advance. In the Finals, the Mooresville Moors and Lexington Indians played a 7–game series, with Mooresville capturing the championship. Hoyt Wilhelm finished the season with a record of 20–7 and a 3.36 ERA. Season attendance at Mooresville Park was 39,091 an average of 704 per game. Mooresville was down three games to none to Lexington in the championship series. The Moors then won the next four games, including a 20-1 victory in the deciding seventh game to claim the championship. Hoyt Wilhelm won three of the four games for Mooresville.

On May 9, 1947, Mooresville's Ross Morrow hit 4 home runs in a game. Playing against the Concord Weavers, Morrow hit 4 home runs in Mooresville's 18–17 victory in the game. For the 1947 season, Morrow hit batted .377 with 21 home runs and 117 RBIs, adding 43 doubles.

Mooresville placed fifth in the 1948 North Carolina State League season standings and did not qualify for the playoffs. The Moors ended the regular season with a record of 57–52, placing fifth in the eight–team league under player/manager Norm Small, who continued his league leading hitting. Mooresville finished 9.5 games behind the first place High Point-Thomasville Hi-Toms in the final regular season standings. Season attendance at Mooresville Park was 33,569. Norm Small again the North Carolina League with both 33 home runs and 130 RBI.

The 1949 Mooresville Moors ended the 1949 season with a record of 72–52, placing second in the North Carolina State League regular season. Jim Mills was the 1949 manager as the Moors finished 18.0 games behind the first place High Point-Thomasville Hi-Toms. In the playoffs, the Lexington Indians swept Mooresville in four games. Attendance at Mooresville Park for the season was 37,414. Pitcher Lester Bringle of Mooresville led the North Carolina State League with 21 wins.

Mooresville placed second in the 1950 North Carolina State League regular season standings for the second consecutive season. The Moors ended the 1950 season with a record of 64–47 under returning manager Jim Mills, finishing 3.5 games behind the first place Salisbury Pirates. In the Playoffs, the High Point-Thomasville Hi-Toms defeated Mooresville Moors 4 games to 2. Season attendance for home games at Mooresville Park was 32,798.

The Mooresville Moors finished with a record 55–71 in 1951 and did not qualify for the North Carolina State League playoffs. Mooresville placed seventh in the North Carolina State League regular season standings, playing the season under managers Tuck McWilliams and Jim Mills. Mooresville finished 35.0 games behind the first place High Point-Thomasville Hi-Toms in the regular season standings. Season home attendance was 18,666, an average of 296 per game.

The 1952 Mooresville Moors were the North Carolina State League Champions in the last season of play for the league. Mooresville ended the 1952 regular season with a record of 70–39, record to place second, playing the season under Manager Jim Mills and finishing 5.0 games behind the first place High Point-Thomasville Hi-Toms. In the playoffs, the Mooresville Moors defeated the Elkin Blanketeers 4 games to 1. In the finals, Mooresville defeated the Salisbury Pirates 4 games to 3 to win their sixth championship. Season attendance at Mooresville Park was 18,241, an average of 335.

After the completion of the 1952 season, the North Carolina State League permanently folded.

=== Tar Heel League (1953) ===
In their final season, the 1953 Mooresville Moors became members of the Class D level Tar Heel League. Mooresville ended the regular season with a record of 58–55, placing fifth under manager Jim Mills, finishing 18.0 games behind the first place Marion Marauders. Season attendance at Mooresville Park was 19,413 an average of 344 per contest. The Mooresville franchise folded from the Tar Heel League following the season, as the league reduced to four teams.

Minor league baseball has not returned to Mooresville following the demise of the Moors. Since 2014, Mooresville has hosted the Mooresville Spinners, a collegiate summer baseball team, playing at Moor Park.

== The ballpark ==
For their duration, the Mooresville Moors hosted minor league at home games exclusively at Mooresville Park. The ballpark had a capacity of 2,500 in 1939 and dimensions (Left, Center, Right): of 210–400–330 in 193 and 320–380–325 in 1940. Today, the site is still in use, known as Moor Park. The park and hosts youth teams, as well as the Mooresville Spinners, a collegiate summer baseball team that began play in 2014 as members of the Carolina-Virginia Collegiate League and who today play in the Southern Collegiate Baseball League. Moor Park is located at 691 South Broad Street.

The former Mooresville Mills/Burlington Industries textile plant that inspired the team moniker was located across from the Mooresville Park. Today, the Merinos Home Furnishings building occupies the former mill complex, near Moor Park. The Mooresville Mill Village Historic District, with homes built to house the factory workers, is adjacent, listed on the National Register of Historic Places.

== Timeline ==
Year(s)	# Yrs.	Team	Level	League	Affiliate	Ballpark
1936	1	Mooresville Moors	Independent	Carolina League	None	Mooresville Park
1937–1942	6	Mooresville Moors	Class D	North Carolina State League	None	Mooresville Park
1945	1	Mooresville Braves	Class D	North Carolina State League	Boston Braves	Mooresville Park
1946–1952	7	Mooresville Moors	Class D	North Carolina State League	None	Mooresville Park
1953	1	Mooresville Moors	Class D	Tar Heel League	None	Mooresville Park

== Year–by–year records ==
Year	Record	Finish	Manager	Playoffs/Notes
1936	35–64	7th	Jim Poole	Salisbury (2–6) relocated May 18
1937	74–35	1st	Jim Poole	Won league pennant League champions
1938	59–53	4th	John Hicks	League Co-Champions
1939	71–38	1st	John Hicks	Won league pennant League champions
1940	60–51	4th	John Hicks	Lost League Finals
1941	57–43	3rd	Ginger Watts	Lost League Finals
1942	61–39	2nd	John Hicks	Lost in 1st round
1945	51–61	6th	Jack Quinlan	Did not qualify
1946	57–52	4th	Bob Crow / Norman Small	League champions
1947	68–43	1st	Norman Small	Won league pennant League champions
1948	57–52	5th	Norman Small	Did not qualify
1949	72–52	2nd	Jim Mills	Lost in 1st round
1950	64–47	2nd	Jim Mills	Lost in 1st round
1951	55–71	7th	Tuck McWilliams / Jim Mills	Did not qualify
1952	70–39	2nd	Jim Mills	League champions
1953	58–55	5th	Jim Mills	Did not qualify

== Notable alumni ==
- Hoyt Wilhelm (1942, 1946–1947) Inducted Baseball Hall of Fame, 1985
- Junie Barnes (1940)
- Fred Chapman (1952)
- Tony Daniels (1942, 1951–1953)
- Herman Fink (1941–1942)
- Charlie Frye (1937)
- Bunny Hearn (1938)
- Jim Hopper (1939, 1948)
- Dave Jolly (1946–1947)
- Garland Lawing (1939)
- Jim Lyle (1938)
- Jim Poole (1936–1937, MGR)
- Tripp Sigman (1937)
- Forrest Thompson (1945, 1951)
- Ed Walczak (1946–1948)
- Eddie Yount (1936)

== See also ==
- Mooresville Moors players
