= Concord Weavers =

- 1936–1951; (1936–1942, 1945–1951); Concord, North Carolina

Minor league affiliations
- Class: Independent (1936–1938); Class D (1939–1942, 1945–1951)
- League: Carolina League (1936–1938); North Carolina State League (1939–1942, 1945–1951)

Major league affiliations
- Team: Philadelphia Phillies (1945); Washington Senators (1949–1950)

Minor league titles
- League titles (1): 1937
- Conference titles (2): 1936; 1946
- Wild card berths (4): 1937; 1939; 1942; 1946

Team data
- Name: Concord Weavers (1936–1942, 1945–1948); Concord Nationals (1949–1950); Concord Sports (1951)
- Ballpark: Webb Field (1936–1942, 1945–1951)

The Concord Weavers were a minor league baseball team based in Concord, North Carolina. Between 1936 and 1951, Concord teams played as a member of the Independent level Carolina League from 1936 to 1938 and the Class D level North Carolina State League from 1939 to 1942 and 1945 to 1951, winning two league pennants and one championship. The franchise played as the Concord Nationals from 1949 to 1950 and Concord Sports in 1951, with Concord teams hosting minor league home games at Webb Field.

Concord teams played as a minor league affiliate of the Philadelphia Phillies in 1945 and Washington Senators from 1949 to 1950.

Baseball Hall of Fame member Tommy Lasorda made his professional debut for the 1945 Concord Weavers.

The Concord Weavers moniker had been revived by Concord's current summer collegiate baseball team.

== History ==
Minor league baseball first came to Concord, North Carolina in 1936 when the Concord Weavers became charter members of the Independent level Carolina League. The Charlotte Hornets, Hickory Rebels, Kannapolis Towelers, Rutherford County Owls, Salisbury Colonials and Shelby Cee-Cees and Valdese Textiles joined the Weavers in league play. The Independent league was nicknamed as an "outlaw" league because of the Independent status. Concord, and most of the other league members, had previously hosted numerous semi-pro teams in the Carolina Textile League, made up of locals and mill workers.

In 1936, the Concord Weavers won the Carolina League pennant. Concord finished the regular season with a 66–33 record to place first during their initial season. In the playoffs, the Weavers defeated the Kannapolis Towelers 3 games to 2 before losing to the Valdese Textiles 4 games to 2 in the league finals. The Weavers drew a season total of 55,426 an average of 1,120 per home game.

The 1937 Concord Weavers won the Carolina League championship. The Weavers finished with a record of 53–44, placing second in the Carolina League regular season standings. In the playoffs, Concord defeated the Valdese Textiles 3 games to 0. In the finals Concord defeated the Kannapolis Towelers 4 games to 1 to win the 1937 Carolina League Championship. The team drew 70,000 for the season.

Concord finished with a 47–47 record, placing fourth in 1938, as the Carolina League became a six–team league. The Carolina League folded after the 1938 season, before returning in 1945. The 1938 Concord Weavers were controlled by a Board of Directors. The board consisted of local business leaders, school administrators, team personnel and media members.

The Concord Weavers joined the Class D level North Carolina State League in 1939, along with the Kannapolis Towelers. Those two teams joined the eight–team North Carolina State League to replace the Gastonia Cardinals and Newton-Conover Twins, who both had moved to the new Tar Heel League. The Concord Weavers began play in the 1939 North Carolina League, along with members Cooleemee Cools, Kannapolis Towelers, Landis Sens, Lexington Indians, Mooresville Moors, Salisbury Giants and Thomasville Tommies.

The Weavers finished with a record of 60–50 in 1939, placing third in the final regular season standings. They were defeated by the Mooresville Moors 3 games to 1 in the playoffs. The 1939 Concord Weavers drew 41,458, an average of 754.

Continuing play in the North Carolina League, Concord placed fifth in 1940 with a 58–54 record. In 1941, the Weavers again finished in fifth place, with a record of 54–51. Concord missed qualifying for the playoffs in both seasons.

In 1942, the Concord Weavers finished with a 64–34 record and won the North Carolina League pennant. In the playoffs, the Thomasville Tommies defeated Concord 3 games to 1. Because of World War II, the North Carolina State League stopped play after the 1942 season before resuming in 1945.

When the North Carolina State League resumed play in 1945, the Concord Weavers played the season as an affiliate of the Philadelphia Phillies. The weavers finished last in the eight–team league with a record of 34–79.

Baseball Hall of Fame inductee Tommy Lasorda made his professional debut for the Concord Weavers in 1945. At age 17, Lasorda pitched and played the field. He finished the 1945 season 3-12, with a 4.09 ERA in 27 games, walking 100 in 121 innings. As a hitter, Lasorda played in 67 games and hit .274 with one home run in 208 at bats.

In 1946, the Weavers went from last to first, finishing 77–34 to win the North Carolina State League pennant. In the playoffs, Concord swept the Thomasville Dodgers in four games. In the Finals, the Mooresville Moors defeated the Weavers 4 games to 2.

The Concord Weavers placed seventh in both 1947 (48–63) and 1948 (44–62), missing the North Carolina State League playoffs in both seasons. They drew 26,148 fans in 1948, an average of 493.

In 1949, Concord became an affiliate of the Washington Senators. Concord played the 1949–1950 seasons as the Senators' affiliate, changing their name to the Concord Nationals. The Concord Nationals finished sixth (50–72) in 1949 and seventh (44–68) in 1950. In 1950, the Nationals drew 22,558, an average of 403 per game.

Concord played as the Concord Sports in 1951. The Sports finished sixth (56–70), missing the playoffs. Concord drew 22,236, an average of 353. Concord folded after the 1951 season and the Hickory Rebels moved to the Western Carolina League. The North Carolina League played the 1952 season with six teams and permanently folded after the season. After 1951, Concord has not hosted another minor league team.

Today, Concord hosts a summer collegiate baseball team, who play in the Southern Collegiate Baseball League. The team revived the Concord Weavers moniker for a time.

== The ballpark ==
Concord teams were referenced to have played home minor league games at Webb Park. Today, the ballpark is owned by the city of Concord, who purchased it from the local school district and it is still in use. The location is 165 Academy Avenue, NW, Concord, North Carolina.

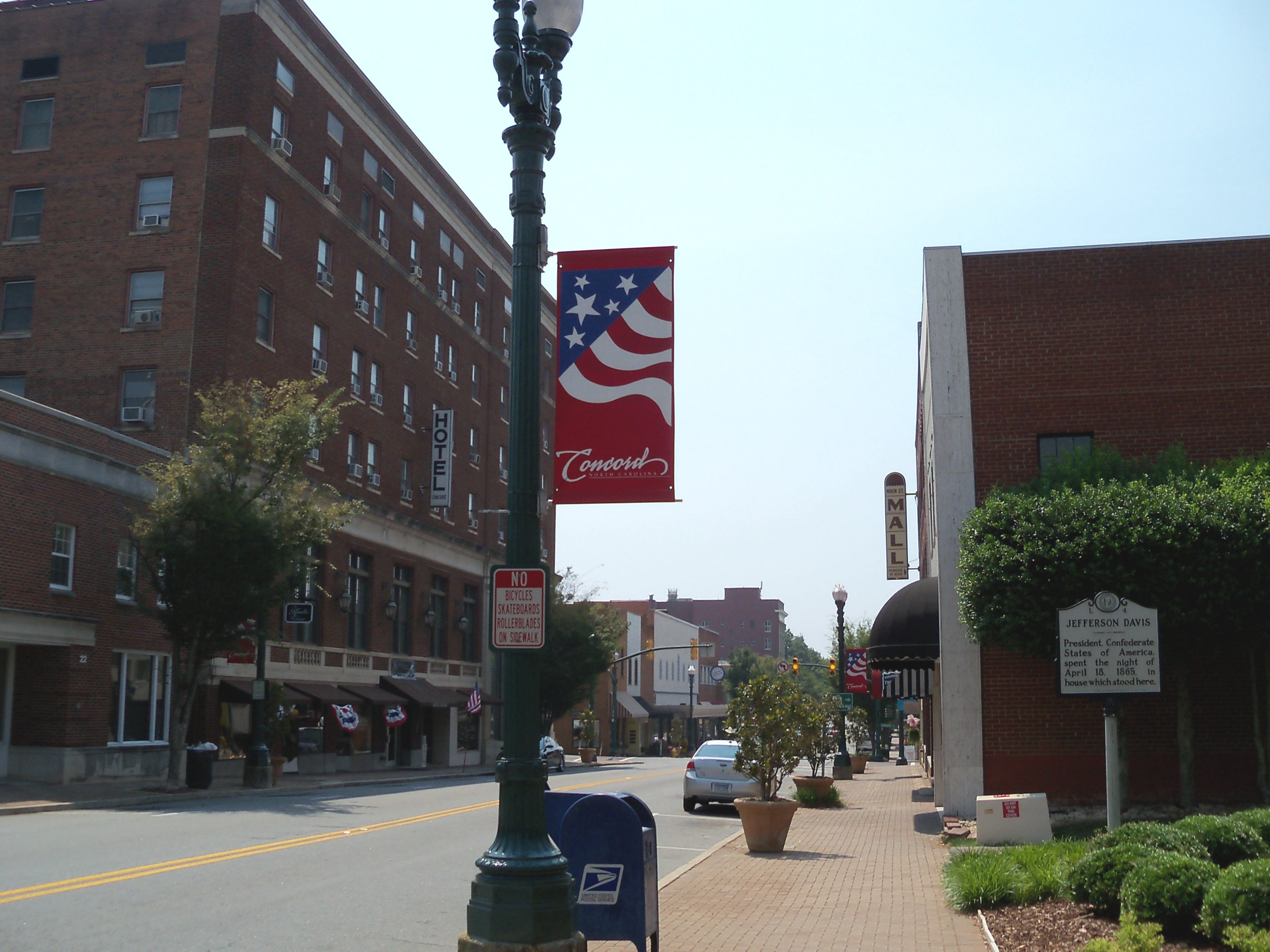
(2011) Downtown. Concord, North Carolina

== Timeline ==
Year(s)	# Yrs.	Team	Level	League	Affiliate	Ballpark
1936–1938	3	Concord Weavers	Independent	Carolina League	None	Webb Park
1939–1942	4	Concord Weavers	Class D	North Carolina State League	None	Webb Park
1945	1	Concord Weavers	Class D	North Carolina State League	Philadelphia Phillies	Webb Park
1946–1948	3	Concord Weavers	Class D	North Carolina State League	None	Webb Park
1949–1950	2	Concord Nationals	Class D	North Carolina State League	Washington Senators	Webb Park
1951	1	Concord Champs	Class D	North Carolina State League	None	Webb Park

== Year–by–year records ==
Year	Record	Finish	Manager	Playoffs/Notes
1936	66–33	1st	Bobby Hipps	Lost in Finals
1937	53–24	2nd	Bobby Hipps	League champions
1938	47–47	4th	Bill Steinecke / Holt Milner	Did not qualify
1939	60–50	3rd	Gerald Fitzgerald	Lost in 1st round
1940	58–54	5th	Gerald Fitzgerald	Did not qualify
1941	51–49	5th	Ulmont Baker	Did not qualify
1942	64–34	1st	Ginger Watts	Lost in 1st round
1945	34–79	8th	Hank Lehman	Did not qualify
1946	77–34	1st	Ginger Watts	Lost League Finals
1947	48–63	7th	Nig Lipscomb	Did not qualify
1948	44–62	7th	Jim Mills	Did not qualify
1949	50–72	6th	James Calleran	Did not qualify
1950	44–68	7th	George Lacy; Thomas Hockenbury / Ginger Watts	Did not qualify
1951	56–70	6th	Ginger Watts / Harry Bell	Did not qualify

== Notable alumni ==
- Tommy Lasorda (1945) Inducted Baseball Hall of Fame, 1997
- Hal Bamberger (1946)
- Red Barbary (1941)
- Junie Barnes (1940)
- Grey Clarke (1946)
- Bill Currie (1946–1947)
- Tony Daniels (1942)
- Vern Freiburger (1947)
- Dick Hyde (1948–1950)
- Nig Lipscomb (1947, MGR)
- Ed Lyons (1941)
- Tony Ordenana (1949)
- Walter Wilson (1939)

== See also ==
- Concord Weavers players
- Concord Nationals players
