= Carolina Textile League =

- Sport: Baseball
- Founded: 1935
- Folded: 1935
- No. of teams: 8
- Country: USA
- Last champion: Landis Cardinals

The Carolina Textile League was a semi–professional baseball league that played in the 1935 season. The league members were located in the Piedmont region of North Carolina. The league evolved into the Carolina League in 1936.

== History ==
The Carolina Textile League was one of several "textile leagues" formed in the region in the era. The Carolina Textile League centered on textile mills the employees who worked in them. The league was formed as an independent league, meaning that it was not a part of the National Association of Professional Baseball Leagues structure. The Carolina Textile League rules permitted up to four players per team who had prior professional baseball experience.

After the 1935 season, the Textile league evolved into the Carolina League. The Carolina League, which played from between 1936 and 1938, was made after the successful 1935 season, with team owners making the decision to rename the league and create a full professional league for the 1936 season. The rule limiting professional players' involvement was dropped during the years of Carolina League play as the league was entirely professional.

== Teams ==
Carolina Textile League Teams

All teams participated only in the 1935 season:

- China Grove: China Grove Chinamen (discontinued play mid-season)
- Concord: Concord Weavers
- Cooleemee: Cooleemee Cools
- Kannapolis: Kannapolis Towelers
- Landis, North Carolina: Landis Cardinals
- Lexington: Lexington Colonials (discontinued play mid-season)
- Mooresville: Mooresville Moors
- Salisbury: Salisbury Greyhounds

== Champions ==
The following team was the sole champion of the Carolina Textile League:

Year	Team
1935	Landis Cardinals
