= Alabama Pitts =

American criminal and baseball player (1909–1941)

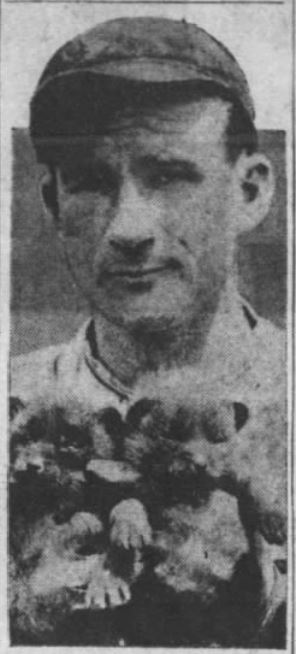
- Pitts in 1935
- Born: Edwin Collins Pitts, Jr. November 22, 1909; Opelika, Alabama, US
- Died: June 7, 1941 (aged 31); Valdese, North Carolina, US
- Conviction: Armed robbery
- Penalty: Eight to sixteen years (over five years served)
- Baseball career
- Outfielder

Minor League debut
- June 23, 1935, for the Albany Senators

Last Minor League appearance
- 1940, for the Hickory Rebels

Minor Leagues statistics
- At bats: 589
- Hits: 156
- Batting average: .265
- Defensive chances: 320
- Putouts: 294
- Fielding percentage: .941
- Stats at Baseball Reference

Teams
- International League: Albany Senators (1935–1936); New York–Pennsylvania League: York White Roses (1936); Trenton Senators (1936); Carolina League: Charlotte Hornets (1936); Gastonia Spinners (1937); Valdese Textiles (1937–1938); Lenoir Finishers (1938); Piedmont League: Winston-Salem Twins (1937); Tar Heel League: Hickory Rebels (1940)
- Football career
No. 50
- Position: Halfback
Personal information
- Listed height: 5 ft 10 in (1.78 m)
- Listed weight: 185 lb (84 kg)
Career history
- Philadelphia Eagles (1935); New Rochelle Bulldogs (1935–1936); Stapleton Buffaloes (1936)
Career statistics
- Receptions: 2
- Receiving yards: 21
- Touchdowns: 0
- Stats at Pro Football Reference

Edwin Collins "Alabama" Pitts Jr. (November 22, 1909 – June 7, 1941) was an American convicted felon who garnered media attention in his attempt to play professional baseball after his release from Sing Sing prison. While serving five years for robbing a grocery store at gunpoint, he played for the prison baseball and American football squads. After being denied the ability to play for the Albany Senators of the International League in 1935 by the president of the National Association of Professional Baseball Leagues, he appealed to Commissioner Kenesaw Mountain Landis, who granted his request.

Pitts went on to play for five years as a baseball player for the Albany Senators; York White Roses and Trenton Senators of the New York–Pennsylvania League; Charlotte Hornets, Gastonia Spinners, Valdese Textiles, and Lenoir Finishers of the Carolina League; Winston-Salem Twins of the Piedmont League; and Hickory Rebels of the Tar Heel League. He played football for two years, including one as a member of the National Football League's Philadelphia Eagles. Two films (The Billion Dollar Scandal and Over the Wall) produced in the 1930s were inspired by his life story. Pitts was fatally stabbed at a tavern in June 1941.

== Early life, family and education ==
Pitts was born in Opelika, Alabama, to Edwin Pitts Sr., a member of the United States Cavalry, and Erma Mills Pitts on November 22, 1909. (Note: Outlaw Ballplayers and Pro-Football-Reference.com list his date of birth as November 22, 1909, which is the date listed on his death certificate. The Associated Press listed his age at death as 30 years old. The Society for American Baseball Research (SABR) lists his date of birth as March 1, 1910, but his tombstone lists his birth date as December 18, 1906, added through a church initiative after his funeral.) Edwin Sr. died five months after his son's birth. Pitts's mother gave him the nickname "Alabama" to distinguish him from his father, who was born in Georgia. She remarried Robert E. Rudd, with whom she had one child, Pitts's half-sister. They divorced thereafter, and Pitts and his mother moved to Peoria, Illinois, where Erma became a telephone operator.

Pitts attended Crossman School, a high school in New Orleans, Louisiana, for one year. He received a gold medal for high jump in 1924.

The next year, at age 15, he enlisted in the United States Navy, and was stationed in China. He served for three years before receiving an honorable discharge. His mother left Illinois to be with her son in New York; a judge later cited her unpredictable tendencies as a potential influence on Pitts's problematic life decisions.

== Criminal activity and imprisonment ==
At the age of 19, Pitts robbed a New York City grocery store with a gun and stole US$76.25 (equivalent to $1,430 in 2025). (Note: Outlaw Ballplayers stated the stolen amount as $76.25, whereas the Associated Press had the amount as $72.50. An article in The Charlotte Observer from 1935 said only $10 was stolen, but SABR confirmed it was $76.25 and that the $10 claim was made up by Pitts.) He and his accomplice, James Murphy, were arrested as they tried to escape in a taxicab. Pitts's mother claimed Murphy had planted the gun on her son. Pitts was implicated in five previous robberies, and for his crimes was sentenced to eight to sixteen years in the Sing Sing prison in Ossining, New York.

Lewis Lawes had begun reforming Sing Sing when he became warden in 1919. This reformation brought about the addition of sports teams to the correctional facility. Pitts played fullback for a football team in the prison system, the Black Sheep, during his sentence. The team was coached by John Law, who was previously the head football coach for Manhattan College. In 1934, the Black Sheep went 10–2 against police departments and independent clubs. He also played basketball and baseball, in which he had a .500 batting average in 21 career games with eight home runs. The United Press wrote in November 1931 that "Alabama is a triple-threat man in more ways than one. He can punt, drop-kick, ram the line, pass, run a broken field, play the harmonica, wiggle his ears, play center field on the prison baseball team and is to be starred in the annual prison show next month." He was noted by the Los Angeles Times in 1934 as "the most prominent jail-bird athlete in America." He tried out with two professional football teams during his sentence. On May 22, 1935, Pitts signed a contract with the Albany Senators of the International League to play baseball for $200 a month (equivalent to $4,697 in 2025 a month). Lawes had Pitts's sentence end three years early, resulting in his release in June 1935 after serving over five years.

== Career ==
During his imprisonment, Pitts tried out with two professional football teams. However, he opted to play baseball for the Albany Senators of the International League, which began upon his early release from prison. On May 22, 1935, while still in prison, Pitts signed a contract with the Senators to play baseball for $200 a month (equivalent to $4,697 in 2025 a month). After his release from prison on June 6, 1935, Pitts's signing with the Senators generated controversy through the media.

W. G. Bramham, the president of the National Association of Professional Baseball Leagues (NAPBL), and Charles H. Knapp, the president of the International League, were opposed to the idea of a former convict playing professional baseball. Knapp refused to approve Pitts's contract, and Bramham supported the decision. An executive committee of the National Association held a hearing on June 11, 1935, to review Bramham's actions. The committee supported Bramham, and Pitts announced that he would appeal to Commissioner Kenesaw Mountain Landis. Albany manager Johnny Evers said he would quit baseball if Pitts were not allowed to play. On June 17, Landis declared that Pitts could play professional baseball due to the "complete reformation in Pitts' character" since the robberies.

Hack Wilson, who previously played for the Chicago Cubs, was moved off of the Senators' roster to make room for Pitts, whose professional baseball debut occurred on June 23, 1935. Evers, the team's manager, obtained permission from the Canadian government to let Pitts play games in Montreal and Toronto, as an exception to their moral turpitude laws. For the 1935 season, Pitts had a batting average of .233 in 116 at bats. Because of injuries, including to his shoulder and finger, Pitts only played in 43 games for the Senators in 1935.

Pitts signed a contract worth $1,500 (equivalent to $35,225 in 2025) for four preseason games and four regular season games with the Philadelphia Eagles of the National Football League to play halfback and defensive back on September 9, 1935. (Note: Eagles owner Bert Bell said in 1949 that he had signed Pitts to a $500 per game contract, since he only played in three of the contracted regular season games.) Signed primarily for publicity reasons, he played in three games for the Eagles, recording two receptions for 21 yards. Eagles coach Lud Wray was opposed to signing a player for non-competitive reasons and kept Pitts off of the field for the first game of the season. With the team getting blown out by the Chicago Bears in a subsequent game, Wray softened to owner Bert Bell's demands and inserted Pitts in the fourth quarter of the game. Bell later called Pitts "just ordinary, not even fair as a player". After the fourth game of the season, Pitts was released after rejecting a contract proposal from the team of $50 per game. He played in a game for the New Rochelle Bulldogs on October 27, 1935.

Pitts started his own traveling basketball team on Thanksgiving Day 1935, called the Alabama Pitts All-Stars; he played with the team during the 1935–36 and 1936–37 seasons. He enlisted former Eagles teammate Max Padlow to replace a missing All-Stars player in a game against the Dayton Pros in December 1935.

After re-signing with the Senators in March 1936, Pitts was demoted to the York White Roses of the New York–Pennsylvania League in May. The White Roses were forced to move to Trenton, New Jersey, due to flooding, where they became the Trenton Senators in June. He was suspended for 15 days during the season due to injuries and poor performance. Pitts finished the season with a .224 batting average in 156 at bats. His last game as a Senator was on July 6. Pitts signed with the Charlotte Hornets of the Carolina League a few days later. Bramham considered it an "outlaw league" and banned its players from signing with NAPBL leagues due to its allowance of players to easily break contracts by signing with other leagues. Later in 1936, Pitts played two more football games for the New Rochelle Bulldogs of the newly formed American Association on November 29 and December 16, and also played for the Stapleton Buffaloes.

Pitts signed with the Winston-Salem Twins of the Piedmont League in 1937. During his time with the team, he had a batting average of .278 in 23 games. He also played with the Gastonia Spinners of the Carolina League during the season, but was released in June 1937 after a fight with the manager. The Valdese Textiles of the Carolina League picked him up for the rest of the 1937 season, and he had a total batting average of .333 during the season in the league. He had 96 runs on 321 at-bats for the league that favored the batter.

In between the 1937 and 1938 seasons, he worked at Pilot Mill, a hosiery mill near Valdese, North Carolina. He spent the 1938 season with the Textiles and Lenoir Finishers, with a batting average of .268. The Carolina League folded after the 1938 season and he returned to Valdese to work. In 1939, he was hired as the baseball coach at Valdese High School. In 1940, he signed with the Hickory Rebels of the Tar Heel League, and he had a season batting average of .303. He was released on August 1, which was surmised in the 2006 book Outlaw Ballplayers as being due to his age or his celebrity not creating strong enough attendance at games. He played for a House of David traveling baseball team in a game on June 5, 1941, and for a Valdese semi-professional team on June 6.

== Personal life and death ==
After his military career, Pitts relocated to New York City, where he married in 1928. Pitts divorced his first wife on April 14, 1937. He married his second wife on December 13, 1937, in Valdese, and they had a daughter together in January 1939. A character in the 1933 film The Billion Dollar Scandal was based on Pitts. Lawes sold Pitts's story to Warner Brothers by August 1935, and the film Over the Wall was released in April 1938 inspired by his life.

On June 7, 1941, Pitts was fatally stabbed in a tavern in Valdese when he tried to cut in to dance with a woman with whom another man was dancing. (Note: SABR lists his date of death as June 6, 1941, but later says the incident began around 3 a.m. on June 7.) Newspaper writers stated Pitts was "quite drunk" at the time.

His funeral service was attended by approximately 5,000 people the next day in Valdese. A 24-year-old man was convicted of manslaughter in Pitts's death, and was sentenced to 10 to 15 years in prison on December 9, 1941. The man later received a pardon by North Carolina governor J. Melville Broughton, who believed the act was justified as self-defense, since he claimed Pitts had been aggressive and threatening towards the couple.
