= Mill Village =

Mill Village may refer to:

- Mill village, a settlement that developed around one or more mills or factories
- Mill Village, Nova Scotia, Canada
- Mill Village, Pennsylvania, United States

== See also ==
- Mooresville Mill Village
- Peppermill Village, Maryland
- Spring Mill Village, Indiana
