= Dick Culler =

American baseball player (1915–1964)

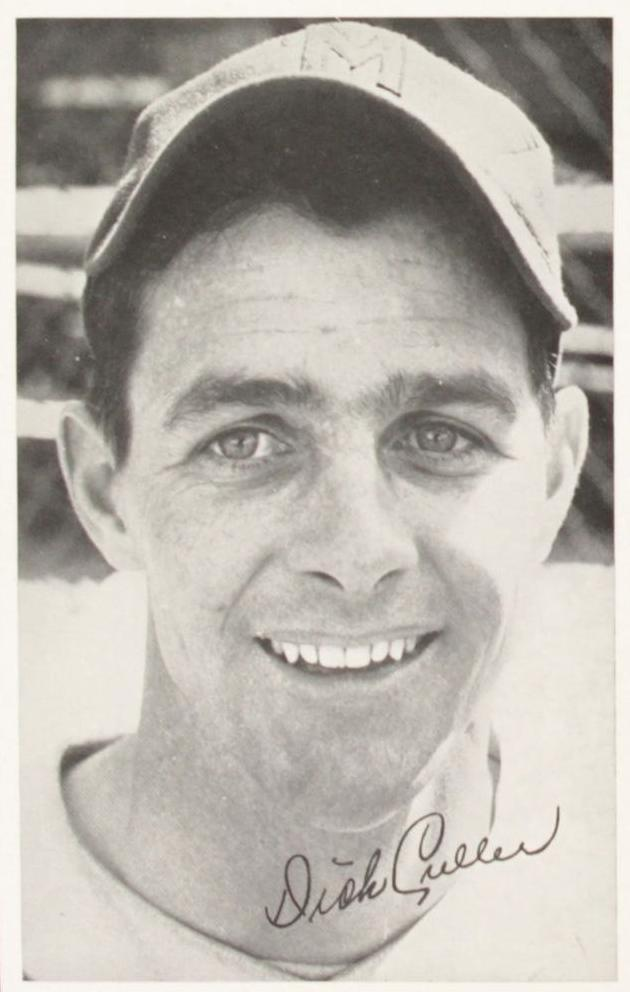
- Shortstop
- Born: January 15, 1915; High Point, North Carolina, U.S.
- Died: June 16, 1964 (aged 49); Chapel Hill, North Carolina, U.S.
- Batted: Right Threw: Right

MLB debut
- September 19, 1936, for the Philadelphia Athletics

Last MLB appearance
- May 25, 1949, for the New York Giants

MLB statistics
- Batting average: .244
- Home runs: 2
- Runs batted in: 99
- Stats at Baseball Reference

Teams
- Philadelphia Athletics (1936); Chicago White Sox (1943); Boston Braves (1944–1947); Chicago Cubs (1948); New York Giants (1949)

Richard Broadus Culler (January 15, 1915 – June 16, 1964), known outside of professional baseball by his middle name, was an American pro baseball player who appeared in 472 Major League games (primarily as a shortstop) for the Philadelphia Athletics (1936), Chicago White Sox (1943), Boston Braves (1944–1947), Chicago Cubs (1948) and New York Giants (1949). The native of High Point, North Carolina, stood 5 feet 9 inches (1.75 m) tall and weighed 155 pounds (70 kg).

In eight MLB seasons he played in 472 games and totalled 1,527 at-bats, 195 runs, 372 hits, 39 doubles, 6 triples, 2 home runs, 99 RBI, 19 stolen bases, 166 walks with a .244 batting average, a .320 on-base percentage and a .281 slugging percentage.

Culler attended High Point College, where he played baseball, basketball and soccer. He was best known for his exploits as captain of the basketball team and his No. 9 was the first ever retired at the school. He was player and coach of the soccer team, and was a pitcher and infielder for the baseball team.

Culler also played in the independent Carolina League for several seasons with the Concord Weavers.

After his playing career, Culler founded and operated the Autographed Baseball Company, which still exists in High Point today.

Culler died in Chapel Hill, North Carolina at the age of 49.
