= Robert Kirby (disambiguation) =

Robert Kirby (1948–2009) was a British musician and arranger.

Robert Kirby may also refer to:

- Robert J. Kirby (1889–1944), American prison warden
- Robert Kirby (satirist) (1936–2007), South African satirist
- Robert Kirby (humor columnist) (born 1953), American writer
- Robert Kirby (cartoonist) (born 1962), American comics artist

== See also ==
- Robion Kirby (born 1938), American mathematician
