= Ed Clary =

American baseball and football player (1916–2005)

- Born: May 22, 1916; Gaffney, South Carolina, U.S.
- Died: February 27, 2005 (aged 88); Columbia, South Carolina, U.S.
- Batted: Left Threw: Unknown

Career statistics
- Games played: 107

Teams
- Martinsville Manufacturers (1939–1940); Landis Dodgers (1940)
Football career
South Carolina Gamecocks
Position	Back
Personal information
Listed height	5 ft 8 in (1.73 m)
Listed weight	177 lb (80 kg)
Career information
High school	Gaffney (SC)
College	South Carolina (1935–1938)
Awards and highlights
All-Southern (1938)

William Edward Clary (May 22, 1916 – February 27, 2005) was an American baseball player and football back. He was drafted professionally in both sports, following a college career at University of South Carolina, pursuing a career in baseball, and spent two seasons with the Martinsville Manufacturers and Landis Dodgers.

Clary was born on May 22, 1916, in Gaffney, South Carolina, and attended Gaffney High School there. A sportswriter reported after one game, "In Ed Clary, Gaffney presented a youngster who could do about everything one could expect of a first class triple threat man. His rushing was good, his blocking of the first order and his kicking the best on the field." Jake Wade, of The Charlotte Observer, wrote, "Take that boy Ed Clary. He weighs 185 pounds and is built ideal for fullback. He breaks the line with the ferocity of a mad bull. He runs around end like he was late for dinner, and he kicks the ball high and wide. As a matter of fact, he kicked one plum into Cleveland County. He did kick one 70 yards in the air."

After graduating in 1935, Clary joined the University of South Carolina, and was a member of the freshman football and baseball teams. He was called one of the team's most outstanding players on the football field by The Gaffney Ledger. He joined the varsity teams in 1937, earning letters in both sports. From 1938 to 1939, Clary was captain of the baseball team. He played fullback and punter on the football team, being named All-Southern as a senior and being the first South Carolina player in the Blue–Gray Football Classic. After the season ended, Clary was named team MVP by teammates, five years after his cousin Earl was given the award and three years after his cousin Wilburn received the honor.

Following his college career Clary was selected in the 14th round (121st overall) of the 1939 NFL draft by the Pittsburgh Steelers, and in the baseball amateur draft by the Brooklyn Dodgers. He opted to play professional baseball, and was sent to the Martinsville Manufacturers Bi-State League team. He batted left-handed and appeared in 54 total games. He appeared at-bat 201 times, and made 61 hits, three doubles, two triples, and one home run.

In Clary's second season, he played for two teams. He first returned to Martinsville, appearing in 28 games with 99 times appearing at-bat, before leaving for the Landis Dodgers of the North Carolina State League. He appeared at-bat 93 times in the remainder of the year, making 27 hits, one double and one triple with Landis. Prior to leaving Martinsville, he made 27 hits, six doubles, and one home run with the team that year.

Clary retired after the 1940 season. He later was drafted to the United States Navy, and served during World War II. He died in February 2005, at the age of 88.
