= Rufe Gentry =

American baseball player (1918–1997)

- Pitcher
- Born: May 18, 1918; Winston-Salem, North Carolina, U.S.
- Died: July 3, 1997 (aged 79); Winston-Salem, North Carolina, U.S.
- Batted: Right Threw: Right

MLB debut
- September 10, 1943, for the Detroit Tigers

Last MLB appearance
- May 9, 1948, for the Detroit Tigers

MLB statistics
- Win–loss record: 13–17
- Earned run average: 4.37
- Strikeouts: 78
- Stats at Baseball Reference

Teams
- Detroit Tigers (1943–1944, 1946–1948)

James Ruffus Gentry (May 18, 1918 – July 3, 1997) was an American professional baseball player, a Major League pitcher who played in all or parts of five seasons for the Detroit Tigers. A right-hander, Gentry stood 6 feet 1 inch (1.85 m) tall and weighed 180 pounds (82 kg).

== Minor league career ==
Born in Daisy Station, near Winston-Salem, North Carolina, Gentry first pitched in organized baseball as part of the company team when he worked for Hanes Hosiery in Winston-Salem. From 1939 to 1941, he played minor league ball for the Landis Senators in the North Carolina State League, Fulton Tigers in the Kitty League (where he struck out 167 batters), and the Winston-Salem Twins of the Piedmont League.

In 1942 and 1943, Gentry pitched for the Buffalo Bisons in the International League. Gentry had good speed on his fastball but lacked control. He struck out 80 batters in 1942, but walked 122. Gentry followed in 1943 with the best season of his career. He pitched an 11-inning no-hitter for the Bisons on Easter Sunday and finished the season with 20 wins and a 2.65 earned run average. He led the league in innings pitched (285), strikeouts (184) and walks (143).

== A promising start with the Tigers: 1943–1944 ==
Gentry's performance in 1943 won him a promotion to the big leagues in September 1943. He went 1–3 for the Tigers in 4 starts, but lost two games by the score of 1–0. So his 1–3 record could have just as easily been 3–1 with any run support from a Tigers batting order depleted by the war.

In 1944, Gentry won a spot in the Tigers' starting rotation, along with Hal Newhouser and Dizzy Trout. Gentry ended the 1944 season a distant third in wins with 12, behind Newhouser's 29 wins and Trout's 27 wins. Gentry continued to have problems with his control as he led the American League in walks with 108 and was 3rd in the league in earned runs allowed.

Toward the end of the 1944 season, Gentry found his stride. He won several games in the pennant stretch, as the Tigers narrowly lost the pennant to the St. Louis Browns. On September 17, 1944, Gentry narrowly missed a no-hitter against the Indians. In the bottom of the 9th inning, with the Tigers ahead 3–0, Lou Boudreau hit an infield single that deflected off Gentry. Ken Keltner followed with a two-out double, and Gentry would up with a 2-hit shutout.

Even in the best game of his career, however, Gentry had problems with his control. Gentry walked the bases loaded in the 4th inning before striking out the final batter. Detroit manager Steve O'Neill later said he had been one pitch away from pulling Gentry in the 4th inning. After the 4th inning, Gentry retired 14 consecutive batters.

Detroit News sportswriter H. G. Salsinger wrote that in the last 6 weeks of the season Gentry "looked to be a certain winner. It would have surprised no one who watched him throw in those last six weeks if he had turned in 20 victories."

== Gentry holds out in 1945 ==
After his performance in 1944, Gentry believed he was entitled to a $1,000 raise. Detroit's general manager Jack Zeller refused, and Gentry opted to hold out. The hold out lasted the entire 1945 season. Gentry reportedly offered to sign in August, but Zeller felt Gentry was out of shape and told him to stay home.

According to a Detroit News article dated August 8, 1945, Gentry had "demanded the same salary the club was paying Harold Newhouser, who won 29 and lost 9 games last year. The club did not think Ruffus worth as much as Harold, but Ruffus insisted in his demands and said that if the club did not meet them he would stay home. He stayed home. He's tired of staying home but the club thinks he got tired too late to do the team any good."

The holdout ended up being costly to both Gentry and Zeller. Gentry missed the opportunity to pitch for a team that won the American League pennant and the 1945 World Series against the Chicago Cubs.

The holdout also cost Zeller. Having refused to give Gentry a $1,000 raise, he found himself short of pitching during the 1945 pennant drive. He ended up purchasing three pitchers late in the season for a total of $40,000. Zeller later stated that refusing the extra $1,000 to Gentry was his "biggest mistake as general manager."

== A gunshot wound to the pitching hand derails a comeback ==
In 1946, Gentry signed with the Tigers but pitched in only 3 innings, giving up 7 walks and accumulating a 15.00 earned run average. Sent back to the minors, any hopes of a comeback were derailed when Gentry accidentally discharged his gun while cleaning it. The resulting shot mangled the index finger on Gentry's pitching hand.

Despite the injury, Gentry tried to come back with a noticeably crooked index finger in 1947 and again in 1948. He pitched only 1/3 of an inning in 1947 and 6 innings in 1948 for the Tigers. Gentry never won a major league ball game after his 1945 holdout.

== Life after baseball ==
After retiring from baseball, Gentry returned to North Carolina and worked as a brick mason and stonemason. His younger brother, Harvey Gentry, also made it to the Major Leagues for a brief stint with the New York Giants in 1954. Gentry died in 1997 in Winston-Salem, aged 79.
