= You Can't Get Away with Murder =

1939 film by Lewis Seiler

- Theatrical poster
- Directed by: Lewis Seiler
- Written by: Jonathan Finn; Lewis E. Lawes
- Screenplay by: Robert Buckner; Don Ryan; Kenneth Gamet
- Based on: Chalked Out (1937) (play) by Lewis E. Lawes
- Produced by: Jack L. Warner; Hal B. Wallis; Samuel Bischoff
- Starring: Humphrey Bogart; Gale Page; Billy Halop
- Cinematography: Sol Polito
- Edited by: James Gibbon
- Music by: Heinz Roemheld
- Distributed by: Warner Bros. Pictures
- Release date: March 24, 1939 (New York)
- Running time: 79 minutes
- Country: United States
- Language: English

You Can't Get Away with Murder is a 1939 crime drama directed by Lewis Seiler and starring Humphrey Bogart, Gale Page and Billy Halop. The film is based on the play Chalked Out by former Sing Sing warden Lewis E. Lawes.

== Plot ==
In New York's Hell's Kitchen, young Johnny Stone ignores the advice of his sister Madge and teams with mobster Frank Wilson. Johnny and Frank steal a car and then rob a gas station at gunpoint. Johnny takes a gun belonging to Madge's fiancé Fred Burke and lends it to Frank for a pawnshop robbery. When the shop owner resists and sounds an alarm, Frank kills him and leaves the gun there, and Johnny cannot return it to Fred's room as he had intended. After finding his gun at the scene, the authorities disbelieve Fred's alibi and he is arrested and convicted of murder. Based on fingerprint evidence, Frank and Johnny are arrested and convicted of the gas-station robbery. All three men are sent to Sing Sing.

Johnny is tortured by the knowledge that Fred is facing execution for their crime. Frank repeatedly reminds Johnny that he must remain silent, as both men face execution if either confesses. The prison authorities separate them, with Johnny assigned to the prison library run by a mild-mannered older convict known as Pop.

Johnny expects Fred to be cleared on appeal, not knowing that Frank had planted stolen property as evidence against Fred. When the appeal is denied, Johnny's pangs of conscience increase. Madge is convinced that Johnny knows the true killer and begs him to talk, still not suspecting Johnny's own involvement. Pop also appeals to Johnny's conscience. Fred's lawyer Carey deduces that Johnny had stolen Fred's gun and is responsible for the murder, but without evidence, the district attorney will not request a stay of Fred's execution, and Johnny, although clearly conflicted, continues to deny his own culpability.

On the day of Fred's execution, Frank and Johnny participate in a jailbreak. Just before the breakout, Johnny slips a written confession in Pop's cell, but Frank takes the paper before it can be read. He resolves to kill Johnny after the jailbreak, which ends in total failure, with Frank and Johnny surrounded by prison guards. Frank has a gun and returns the guards' fire while also shooting Johnny before being captured. Johnny, mortally wounded, finally tells the truth to the authorities, clearing the way for Fred's release. Just before dying, Johnny requests and receives Fred's forgiveness.

== Cast ==
- Humphrey Bogart as Frank Wilson
- Gale Page as Madge Stone
- Billy Halop as Johnny Stone
- John Litel as Attorney Carey
- Henry Travers as Pop
- Harvey Stephens as Fred Burke
- Harold Huber as Tom Scappa
- Joe Sawyer as Red
- Joe Downing as Smitty
- George E. Stone as Toad
- Joe King as Principal Keeper (P.K.) (credited as Joseph King)
- Joseph Crehan as Warden
- John Ridgely as Gas Station Attendant
- Herbert Rawlinson as District Attorney
- Emory Parnell as Second Detective (uncredited)
- Frankie Burke as Billiard Player (uncredited)
- Eddie Anderson as Sam (uncredited)
- Frank Faylen as Boat Tour Guide (uncredited)

== Production ==
After Broadway producer Brock Pemberton commissioned former Sing Sing warden Lewis E. Lawes to write Chalked Out for the stage in 1936, Billy Halop of the Dead End Kids, who would later star in the film, accepted the role of Johnny Stone. However, Halop was forced to withdraw from the production after two weeks of rehearsals in order to appear in the William Wyler film Dead End. The play debuted at the Morosco Theatre in New York on March 25, 1937.

== Reception ==
In a contemporary review for The New York Times, critic Bosley Crowther wrote: "When you see a picture which has such a flatly declarative title as 'You Can't Get Away With Murder' ... it is almost impossible to suppress the impish question: 'What about movie producers?' For the Warner Brothers, in particular, murder has been a profitable pastime for years: it is said that there are old extras on the Warner lot who scarcely breath the air of freedom from one prison picture to another. And Warners' most valuable stock players like Humphrey Bogart, Billy Halop and John Litel are held, not so much by five-year contracts, as by five-year sentences. Or at least so it must seem to them at times."

== Home media ==
The film was released on DVD by Warner Archive on February 23, 2012.
