= Over the Wall (film) =

1938 film by Frank McDonald

- Theatrical release poster
- Directed by: Frank McDonald
- Screenplay by: Crane Wilbur; George Bricker
- Story by: Lewis E. Lawes
- Produced by: Bryan Foy
- Starring: Dick Foran; June Travis; John Litel; Dick Purcell; Veda Ann Borg; George E. Stone
- Cinematography: James Van Trees
- Edited by: Frank Magee
- Production company: Cosmopolitan Productions
- Distributed by: Warner Bros. Pictures
- Release date: April 2, 1938
- Running time: 67 minutes
- Country: United States
- Language: English

Over the Wall is a 1938 American drama film directed by Frank McDonald and written by Crane Wilbur and George Bricker, based on a story by Lewis E. Lawes. The film stars Dick Foran, June Travis, John Litel, Dick Purcell, Veda Ann Borg and George E. Stone. The film was released by Warner Bros. Pictures on April 2, 1938.

== Plot ==
Jerry Davis is an outlaw and troublemaker, one day he gets arrested for murder and sent to Sing Sing, there he discovers that he has a great singing voice and begins to rehabilitate himself.

== Cast ==
- Dick Foran as Jerry Davis
- June Travis as Kay Norton
- John Litel as Father Neil Connor
- Dick Purcell as Ace Scanlon
- Veda Ann Borg as Maxine
- George E. Stone as Gyp
- Ward Bond as Eddie Edwards
- John Hamilton as Warden
- Jonathan Hale as Governor
- Tommy Bupp as Jimmy Davis
- Robert Homans as John Davis
- Mabel Hart as Mrs. Davis
- Raymond Hatton as Convict
- Alan Davis as Joe
- Eddy Chandler as Prison Keeper

== Production ==
Lawes wrote the story based on the life of Sing Sing inmate Alabama Pitts, who became a professional athlete following his stint as a well-known athlete in the prison. It was picked up by Warner Bros. Pictures by August 1935 under the title The Comeback. In November 1935, James Cagney was hired to portray Pitts' character in the film with Lloyd Bacon directing. However, due to Cagney's lawsuit against Warner Bros. for breach of contract, the studio replaced him. In April 1936, Dick Purcell was being considered for the role. Harry Sauber, Ben Markson, Tom Reed, and Jonathan Finn were initially working as screenplay writers as of June 1936. In July 1936, Ross Alexander was hired to replace Cagney as Pitts' character, but the role eventually went to Dick Foran. The film was titled Evidence during production, but was changed to Over the Wall in December 1937 before the film's release.
