= Escape from Crime =

1942 film

- Directed by: D. Ross Lederman
- Written by: Raymond L. Schrock; Daniel Ahern
- Starring: Richard Travis; Julie Bishop
- Cinematography: James Van Trees
- Edited by: Doug Gould
- Music by: William Lava
- Distributed by: Warner Bros. Pictures
- Release date: July 25, 1942
- Running time: 51 minutes
- Country: United States
- Language: English

Escape from Crime is a 1942 American crime film directed by D. Ross Lederman. It has essentially the same plot as the earlier Picture Snatcher (1933).

Red O'Hara serves a prison sentence after being framed by Dude Merrill. Once he is released, he gets a job as a news photographer. Red takes a mug shot of a big talking new inmate as he does his prison job. Minutes later Red is paroled for no apparent reason and is a free man. One of his old gang buddies picks him up and he finds out that the reason his wife hadn’t come to see him in prison is because she was pregnant with their son. Now he wants to put gang life behind him and get a job as a newspaper reporter. Although the newspaper is hesitant to hire an ex convict, he catches a break by taking pictures of his former gang members shooting their way out of a bank robbery. That leads to a good-paying regular job, but one that requires him to secretly film the electric chair-execution of his former gang friend, who, with others, was convicted of the bank robbery Red had photographed.

== Cast ==
- Richard Travis as Red O'Hara
- Julie Bishop as Molly O'Hara
- Jackie Gleason as Screwball Evans (as Jackie C. Gleason)
- Frank Wilcox as Cornell
- Rex Williams as Slim Dugan
- Wade Boteler as Lieutenant 'Biff' Malone
- Charles C. Wilson as Reardon (as Charles Wilson)
- Paul Fix as Dude Merrill
- Ruth Ford as Myrt
- John Hamilton as Rafferty
- Ann Corcoran as Belle Mason
- Ben Taggart as Warden Kirby
