= Lewis E. Lawes =

American prison warden (1883–1947)

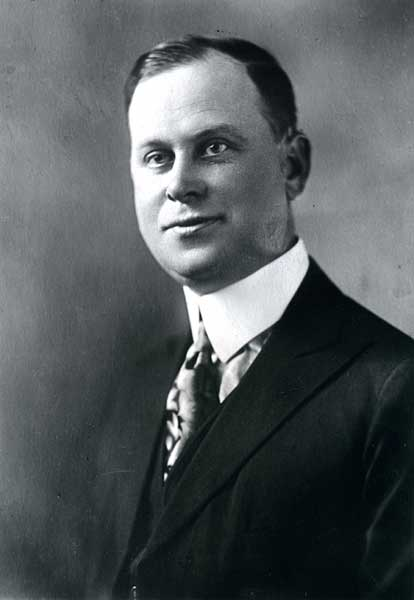

Warden of Sing Sing
- In office January 1, 1920 – July 16, 1941
- Preceded by: Daniel J. Grant as acting warden
- Succeeded by: Robert John Kirby

Personal details
- Born: Lewis Edward Lawes; September 13, 1883 Elmira, New York, US
- Died: April 23, 1947 (aged 63) Garrison, New York, US
- Cause of death: Cerebral hemorrhage
- Spouse: Kathryn (died 1937)

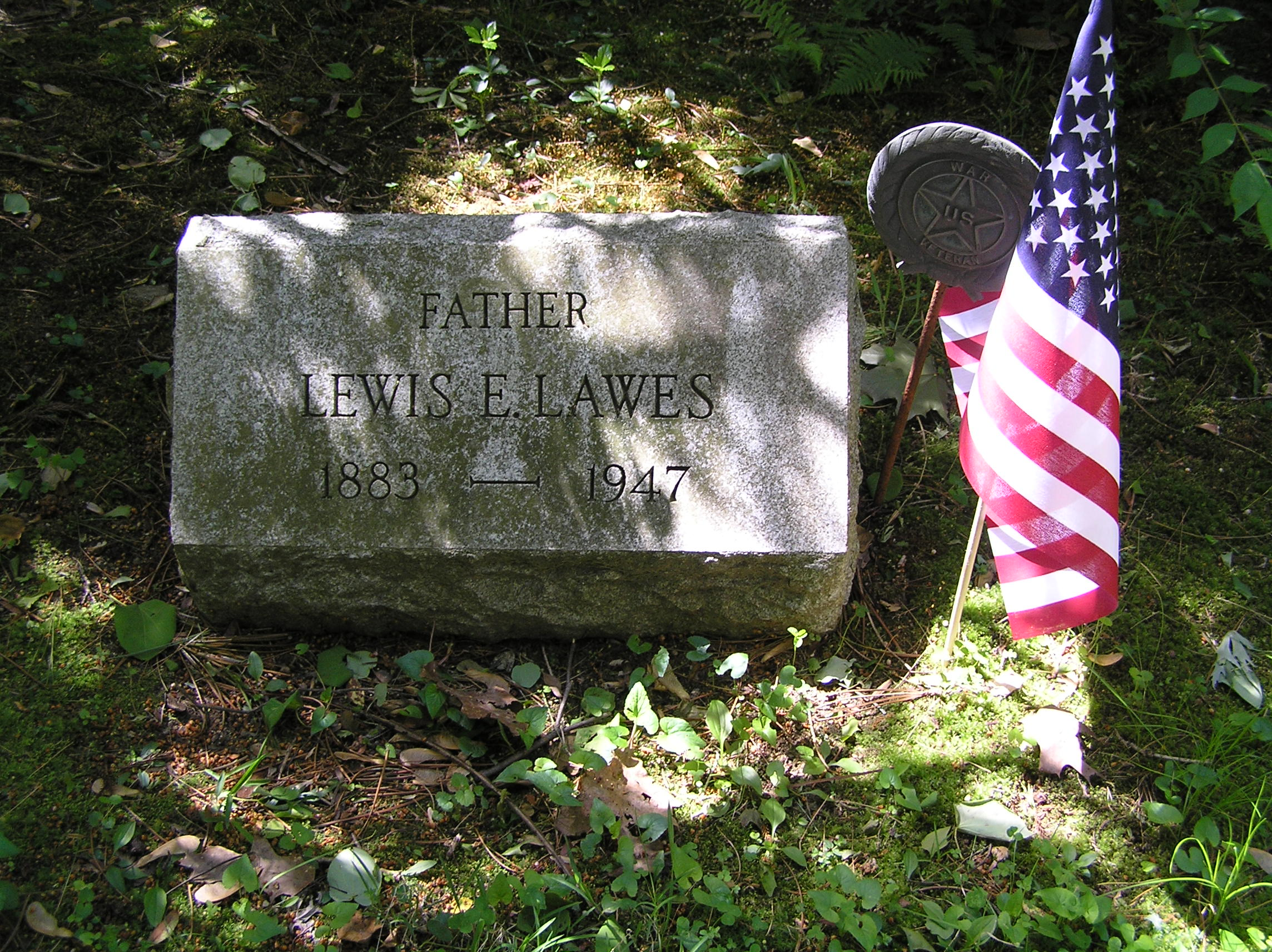
The gravesite of Lewis E. Lawes

Lewis Edward Lawes (September 13, 1883 – April 23, 1947) was a prison warden and a proponent of prison reform. During his 21-year tenure at Sing Sing Correctional Facility, he supervised the executions of 303 prisoners (299 men and four women). Despite supervising hundreds of executions, Lawes prominently opposed the death penalty; both during his tenure as Sing Sing's warden and after his 1941 retirement, Lawes used his position to repeatedly advocate for the abolition of capital punishment. An EBSCO biography on him called him "the best-known prison warden in the country in the 1920s and 1930s".

== Biography and early career ==
Lawes was born on September 13, 1883, in Elmira, New York. He was the only child of Henry Lewis Lawes (died 1925) and Sarah Abbott. His father worked as a prison guard at the New York State Reformatory, now called the Elmira Correctional Facility.

Lawes ran away from home at 17 and joined the United States Army Coast Artillery Corps.

Afterwards, he worked at an insurance company before beginning his prison career as a guard at Clinton Prison in Dannemora, New York, on March 1, 1905. On September 30, 1905, he married Katherine Stanley. He subsequently worked at first at Auburn Prison, then at Elmira Reformatory. In March 1915 he was named Superintendent of the City Reformatory on Hart Island in New York City. Lawes became warden of the Massachusetts State Prison in 1918.

Lawes was featured on the cover and in an article of Time magazine issue of November 18, 1929.

His wife, Kathryn (1887–1937), died on October 31, 1937, at Ossining Hospital after she fell at the end of the Bear Mountain Bridge in Cortlandt, New York. The heel of her shoe got caught between two boards, which caused her to fall and break her leg. She was not found until nighttime and died from hypothermia.

Characters based on Lewis and Kathryn Lawes may be found in David Pietrusza's 2014 historical novel Dance Hall: A Novel of Sing Sing.

Lawes became the president of the Boy Rangers of America in 1941.

Lawes died of a cerebral hemorrhage on April 23, 1947, at age 63 in Garrison, New York. He was interred at Sleepy Hollow Cemetery in Sleepy Hollow, New York.

== Career as warden of Sing Sing ==
New York Governor Al Smith asked Lawes to take over as warden of Sing Sing in light of several scandals, with the prison supposedly seeking a "progressive new warden" and looking at Lawes to fill the position. Lawes took charge on January 1, 1920. The first execution he oversaw as warden was that of 30-year-old Vincenzo Esposito on January 8, 1920, only one week after Lawes' official start date.

Lawes prioritized rehabilitative and humanitarian gestures over punitive measures while warden. He noted that most inmates would eventually be released to the public and should be treated with humanity to make their transition into civilian life easier. To that end, he exposed prisoners to music and theater programs, ensured they were exposed to ample sunshine, and encouraged competitive sports, particularly gridiron football. Lawes also invited the New York Yankees to the prison for exhibition games.

Some New York judges criticized Lawes for humanizing inmates; FBI Director J. Edgar Hoover condemned Lawes for treating "the convict as a 'human being'". Others considered Lawes a leading authority on the subjects of rehabilitation and penal reform.

He served as warden of Sing Sing for twenty-one years, instituting reforms, until he retired on July 16, 1941. He was replaced by Robert J. Kirby.

== Views on capital punishment ==
During his time as warden of Sing Sing, Lawes prominently and repeatedly expressed his opposition to the death penalty. A 2011 retrospective on his life, published in the New York Times, said, "Nobody killed more people, with more regret, than Lewis E. Lawes." In 1923, he wrote, "I shall ask for the abolition of the Penalty of Death, until I have the infallibility of human judgment demonstrated to me." The John Jay College of Criminal Justice archived his papers after his death, and his papers showed that he would fall physically ill after each execution that took place at Sing Sing. One condemned man, Patrick Murphy, requested an alcoholic beverage in his last hours, which was against prison rules; Lawes delivered him "a medicinal dose of bourbon" anyway. Murphy offered him a dose as well and said, "You need the shot more than I do, warden." Shortly before the August 9, 1934 executions of Anna Antonio and her two criminal associates Sam Faraci and Vincent Saetta, Lawes released a statement reading: "I am more than ever opposed to these legal killings. While I am convinced that the chair is the most humane method of execution, it is, after all, but a legal killing. I can reach but only one conclusion every time I carry out a death sentence. From every point of view, the death penalty is futile. The death penalty has been tried, judged, and found wanting."

Lawes noted in his writings that the death penalty was applied arbitrarily and capriciously, using as evidence that only one out of every 80 murderers would be subjected to the death penalty; he also noted that it was rare for wealthy people to be executed, writing, "Did you ever see a rich man go the whole route through the Death House? I don't know of any." In 1923, Lawes gave an address at the First Methodist Church in New York's Jamaica Plain district in which he expressed his anti-death penalty views. In the address, Lawes said the governors of Nebraska, Indiana, Arizona, South Dakota, and Pennsylvania had reached out to him to express they shared his abolitionist stance on capital punishment. Lawes also noted that the death penalty in New York was disproportionately applied to prisoners of Italian descent, a statistic that he found especially concerning in light of the fact that Italy, which he said had abolished capital punishment in 1890, had a very low murder rate.

Lawes also challenged the notion that capital punishment was a deterrent to capital crimes and questioned the internal contradictions of the death penalty, such as the idea that it was to serve as a deterrent while the state simultaneously sought less grisly and more humane methods of execution. A few years before he retired, he told the General Federation of Women's Clubs that he knew his crusade to see the death penalty abolished would be difficult and that "it is slow work because civilization, if it is civilization we now have, is making very slow progress."

== Writings ==
Lawes wrote several books. Several of his works were made into films. His most famous book, Twenty Thousand Years in Sing Sing, was made into a 1932 movie under the same title, starring Spencer Tracy, and again in 1940 as Castle on the Hudson, featuring John Garfield. Over the Wall was produced in 1938 based on the life of one of his inmates, Alabama Pitts. Invisible Stripes in 1939, with George Raft, was based on his novel of the same name, while Humphrey Bogart starred in You Can't Get Away with Murder in 1939, an adaptation of Chalked Out, a play Lawes co-wrote.

His papers are archived in the Special Collections of the Lloyd Sealy Library, John Jay College of Criminal Justice.

== Radio series ==
From January 22, 1933, to April 21, 1939, Lawes narrated an NBC radio series (Red and Blue networks) which was also titled Twenty Thousand Years at Sing Sing and was based on his famous book. The show offered various stories based on the lives of the 2000 inmates at the prison, some with positive outcomes and others with negative results.
