= 20,000 Years in Sing Sing =

1932 film

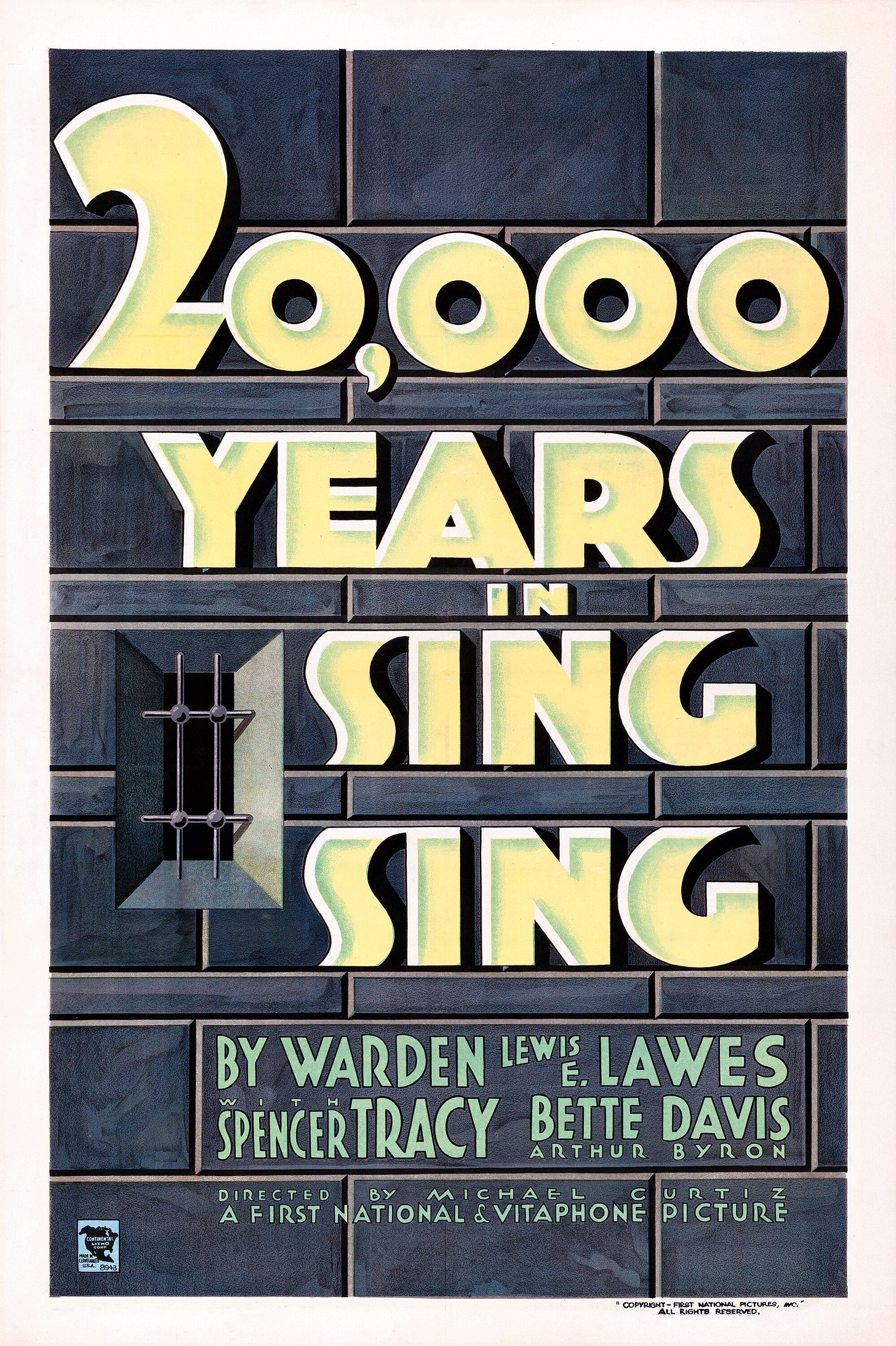
- Theatrical release poster
- Directed by: Michael Curtiz
- Written by: Courtney Terrett (adaptation); Robert Lord (adaptation)
- Screenplay by: Wilson Mizner; Brown Holmes
- Based on: Twenty Thousand Years in Sing Sing; 1932 book by Lewis E. Lawes
- Produced by: Darryl F. Zanuck (uncredited); Raymond Griffith (uncredited supervising producer); Robert Lord (uncredited associate producer)
- Starring: Spencer Tracy; Bette Davis; Louis Calhern
- Cinematography: Barney McGill
- Edited by: George Amy
- Music by: Bernhard Kaun
- Production company: First National Pictures
- Distributed by: Warner Bros. Pictures
- Release date: December 24, 1932
- Running time: 78 minutes
- Country: United States
- Language: English
- Budget: $234,000
- Box office: $935,000

20,000 Years in Sing Sing is a 1932 American pre-Code drama film set in Sing Sing Penitentiary, the maximum security prison in Ossining, New York, starring Spencer Tracy as an inmate and Bette Davis as his girlfriend. It was directed by Michael Curtiz and based on the nonfiction book Twenty Thousand Years in Sing Sing written by Lewis E. Lawes, the warden of Sing Sing from 1920 to 1941.

The film was remade by First National Pictures as Castle on the Hudson in 1940, starring John Garfield, Ann Sheridan and Pat O'Brien.

== Plot ==
Cocky Tommy Connors is sentenced for up to 30 years in Sing Sing for robbery and assault with a deadly weapon. His associate Joe Finn promises to use his contacts and influence to free Connors, but his attempt to bribe the warden to provide special treatment is met with disdain and failure. Connors makes trouble immediately, but the prolonged confinement in his cell begins to change his attitude. As the warden had predicted, Connors is glad to contribute some honest work on the rockpile after his period of inactivity.

However, Connors's determination to escape is unshaken. Bud Saunders, a highly educated fellow prisoner desperate to be with his pregnant wife, recruits Connors and another inmate for a complicated escape attempt. However, the escape is scheduled for a Saturday, a day that Connors superstitiously regards as unlucky for him. He withdraws from the plan, forcing Saunders to take another volunteer. The warden is alerted to the escape attempt, and although two guards are killed, the attempt is foiled. Trapped, Saunders jumps to his death. His two accomplices are captured and returned to their cells.

Connors's girlfriend Fay Wilson visits him regularly in prison since his trial. On one visit, she admits that she has become close to Finn to encourage him to help Connors, but Connors tells her that she is only providing Finn with a reason to keep him locked in jail. Connors learns that Fay was injured in a car accident and is not expected to live. The warden grants Connors a 24-hour leave to see her, and Connors promises to return.

When Connors sees Fay, he learns that Finn was responsible for her injuries. He takes a gun from a drawer, but Fay persuades him to give it to her. Finn appears, expecting Fay to sign a statement exonerating him in exchange for $5,000 that he intended to give to Connors. Connors and Finn fight, and Fay shoots Finn. Connors flees, taking the gun with him, and Fay secretly slips the money into his pocket. Before he dies, Finn names Connors as his killer.

The warden is lambasted in the newspapers for allowing Connors to leave the prison. Just when the warden is about to sign a letter of resignation, Connors emerges. Connors is found guilty of first-degree murder and sentenced to death in the electric chair despite Fay's testimony that it was she who killed Finn. Connors comforts her before being taken to death row.

== Cast ==
- Spencer Tracy as Tommy Connors
- Bette Davis as Fay Wilson
- Louis Calhern as Joe Finn
- Arthur Byron as the Warden, Paul Long
- Lyle Talbot as Bud Saunders
- Warren Hymer as Hype
- Grant Mitchell as Tester of Convicts' IQ

== Production ==
20,000 Years in Sing Sing is the only screen pairing of Bette Davis and Spencer Tracy. They wanted to work together for another film but never had the opportunity, although they did both appear on a radio version of Dark Victory in 1940.

Tracy, under contract to Fox Film Corporation, was lent to Warner Bros. for the film. The role was originally intended for James Cagney, but Cagney was in a dispute with Jack L. Warner.

Lewis E. Lawes, who wrote the book that is the basis of the film, was the warden of Sing Sing at the time of the filming and approved the screenplay. He influenced preliminary versions of the script with suggestions and verified that all of the film's scenes followed the actual procedures used at Sing Sing.

Separate film crews worked on the film, one on location at Sing Sing led by director Ray Enright, and another in Hollywood directed by Michael Curtiz. However, Curtiz is the film's sole credited director. Lawes permitted the crew to film scenes inside the prison, including mob scenes. The film was shot in 30 days with a budget of $215,000.

The film's scenes showing the operation of Sing Sing's electric chair reflect the prologue of Lawes's book, which included a graphic description of the electrocution process. Despite supervising the execution of more than 300 men at Sing Sing, Lawes opposed capital punishment and wrote the prologue as an argument against it.

== Release ==
The film's planned release date of December 24, 1932 was delayed until January 14, 1933. It was screened for preview audiences in Hollywood in early November 1932.

== Reception ==
In a contemporary review for The New York Times, critic Mordaunt Hall wrote: "In this rapidly paced film there are some extraordinarily interesting glimpses of prison routine, which were gleaned both from Mr. Lawer's [sic] story and from a study of life in Sing Sing. For the purpose of setting forth a dramatic narrative the producers have seen fit to take certain liberties with the scheme of things and, unfortunately, there is the grim idea in the end of another man on the screen awaiting the electric chair. ... Spencer Tracy as the central character, Thomas Connors, gives a clever and convincing portrayal."

== Box office ==
According to Warner Bros. records, the film earned $504,000 in the U.S. and $431,000 in other countries.

== Radio series ==
A radio series, titled Twenty Thousand Years in Sing Sing (later retitled Behind Prison Bars, then Criminal Case Histories) ran during various periods from January 22, 1933, to April 21, 1939. It was broadcast alternately on NBC's Red and Blue networks. It featured warden Lewis Lawes as its narrator and its stories ranged from upbeat to grim, with an emphasis on stories of successful rehabilitation.

== See also ==
- List of American films of 1932
