= Castle on the Hudson =

1940 film by Anatole Litvak

- Directed by: Anatole Litvak
- Screenplay by: Seton I. Miller; Brown Holmes; Courtney Terrett
- Based on: Twenty Thousand Years in Sing Sing; 1932 book by Lewis E. Lawes
- Produced by: Anatole Litvak; Samuel Bischoff
- Starring: John Garfield; Ann Sheridan; Pat O'Brien; Burgess Meredith
- Cinematography: Arthur Edeson
- Edited by: Thomas Richards
- Music by: Adolph Deutsch
- Distributed by: Warner Bros. Pictures
- Release date: February 17, 1940
- Running time: 77 minutes
- Country: United States
- Language: English

Castle on the Hudson (UK title: Years Without Days) is a 1940 American prison film directed by Anatole Litvak and starring John Garfield, Ann Sheridan and Pat O'Brien. The film was based on the book Twenty Thousand Years in Sing Sing, written by Lewis E. Lawes, on whom the warden (played by O'Brien) in the film was based. Castle on the Hudson is a remake of the 1932 Spencer Tracy prison film 20,000 Years in Sing Sing, also based on Lawes's book.

== Plot ==
Tommy Gordon, a cocky, arrogant career thief, is nailed by New York City authorities after pulling a big heist. He is sentenced to a minimum seven years at the state prison in Ossining, aka Sing Sing, on the shores of the Hudson River. There, he meets prison warden Walter Long, to whom he takes an immediate dislike. It takes months, but Tommy finally settles into the dull routine of prison life.

If there is one rule that the superstitious Tommy Gordon has always obeyed, it's "never pull a job on a Saturday." So when fellow inmate Steve Rockford invites Tommy to join him in a planned weekend breakout, he declines. Sure enough, Rockford's escape attempt goes awry, and he dies. Afterwards, Warden Long learns of Tommy's refusal to collaborate with Rockford. So later, when he receives news that Tommy's girlfriend, Kay Manners, is seriously ill, he offers Tommy temporary unsupervised parole, just long enough to visit Kay. Despite the parole's taking place on a Saturday, Gordon gratefully accedes.

Once in New York, however, Tommy gets into an altercation with his shyster lawyer, who is shot dead by a sick, convalescing Kay. Though he is innocent of the crime, Tommy decides to protect Kay by taking the blame for the shooting. Upon returning to Sing Sing, he greets the warden with a fake confession. A courtroom trial follows, where despite Kay's objections, Tommy is convicted and sentenced to the electric chair. Unlike many of his death-row companions who panic and break down as their appointment with fate approaches, Tommy faces up to the consequences of his decision. In the end, he calmly walks the last mile to his execution, accompanied by a solemn Warden Long and the prison's chaplain.

== Cast ==
- John Garfield as Tommy Gordan
- Ann Sheridan as Kay Manners
- Pat O'Brien as Warden Walter Long
- Burgess Meredith as Steve Rockford
- Henry O'Neill as District Attorney
- Jerome Cowan as Ed Crowley
- Guinn "Big Boy" Williams as Mike Kagel
- John Litel as Prison Chaplain
- Margot Stevenson as Ann Rockford
- Willard Robertson as Detective Ragan
- Edward Pawley as Black Jack
- Billy Wayne as Pete
- Nedda Harrigan as Mrs. Long
- Wade Boteler as Principal Keeper
- Barbara Pepper as Goldie
- Robert Strange as Joe Morris
- William Hopper as Reporter (uncredited)
- Grant Mitchell as Psychologist Dr. Ames (uncredited)
- Frank Puglia as Tony, Prisoner on death row (uncredited)
- Adrian Morris as Prisoner (uncredited)
- John Lester Johnson, as Prisoner (uncredited)

== Production ==
One year earlier, John Garfield had refused to play a role in Invisible Stripes (1939) as George Raft's younger brother, and this had forced Warner Bros. Pictures to place him on the first of his 11 total suspensions while at the studio. It was only after Warners agreed to allow Garfield to play the lead role in a film based on Maxwell Anderson's 1927 play Saturday's Children that Garfield agreed to first act in Castle on the Hudson.

Before filming commenced, Garfield demanded that the book's original ending, in which his character is killed in the electric chair for a crime that he did not commit, be retained in the film's script. He also pressed for a $10,000 bonus, and the studio agreed to both demands.

== Reception ==
In a contemporary review for The New York Times, critic B. R. Crisler wrote: "This is merely a routine notice that Mr. John Garfield, formerly of the Group Theatre, who was recently sentenced to a term in Warner Bros. films, is still in prison. Don't be misled by any announcement you may have read that Mr. Garfield had managed to stage a successful break with the aid of a saw smuggled into his contract, and don't let the fancy title, 'Castle on the Hudson,' arouse shining hopes, either. ... Mr. Garfield, who seems to be wearing a little thin, for some reason—can it be possible that he has been a trifle overbuilt as a screen personality?—is the tough but golden-hearted prisoner who goes to the death-house trailing wisecracks like cigarette ashes."

Los Angeles Times reviewer John L. Scott wrote: "The picture's virility is undoubted and performances are realistic. ... Whether it will have a wide appeal is a question because of its drab subject."

According to his biographer, Garfield was disappointed that "the critics did not think more highly of the film or his performance." It also seemed that Garfield had been continually trying to "prove that he had far more range as an actor" than Warners had allowed him to demonstrate. When the studio assigned him another shallow tough-guy role in Flight Angels (1940), he rejected it and was again placed on suspension.

Pat O'Brien took legal action against the Globe Theatre in New York during its run of Castle on the Hudson because his name was billed below that of Garfield on the theater's marquee.

== Legacy ==
In 1977, the Greater Ossining Arts Council hosted a film festival under the title of "Stars in Stripes Forever" that featured films shot or set at Sing Sing. The films included Castle on the Hudson and others such as Invisible Stripes (1939), Each Dawn I Die (1939) and 20,000 Years in Sing Sing (1932).

== See also ==
- List of American films of 1940
- 20,000 Years in Sing Sing, an earlier film also based on the Lawes book
