= Vince Barton =

Canadian baseball player (1908–1973)

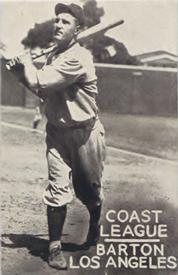
- Outfielder
- Born: February 1, 1908; Edmonton, Alberta, Canada
- Died: September 13, 1973 (aged 65); Toronto, Ontario, Canada
- Batted: Left Threw: Right

MLB debut
- July 17, 1931, for the Chicago Cubs

Last MLB appearance
- July 24, 1932, for the Chicago Cubs

MLB statistics
- Batting average: .233
- Home runs: 16
- Runs batted in: 65
- Stats at Baseball Reference

Teams
- Chicago Cubs (1931–1932)

Vincent David Barton (February 1, 1908 – September 13, 1973) was a Canadian Major League Baseball outfielder for the Chicago Cubs.

Barton had a very successful rookie year for the Cubs. In only 66 games he batted .238 with 13 HRs and 50 RBIs. His 13 home runs was tied for second on the team with current Hall of Famer Hack Wilson, although Wilson played in many more games than Barton. The next season would be Barton's last year in the majors as he batted .224 in 36 games with 3 homers and 15 RBIs.

== 5 Home Run Game ==
While playing for the Hickory Rebels of the independent Carolina League on August 28, 1938, Barton hit five home runs in six at-bats.
