= Robert J. Kirby =

American prison warden (1889–1944)

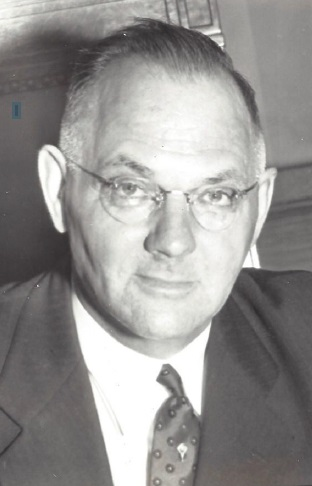

Warden of Sing Sing
- In office 1941–1944

Personal details
- Born: Robert John Kirby; October 20, 1889 Beekmantown, Clinton, New York, USA
- Died: January 15, 1944 (aged 54) Ossining, Westchester, New York, USA
- Resting place: St. Vincent Cemetery; Attica, NY
- Spouse(s): Anna Lillian (Conners) Kirby (1914-1934) {her death} Gladys Nora (Kelly) Kirby (1935-1944) {his death}
- Children: 6

Robert John Kirby (October 20, 1889 – January 15, 1944) was the Warden of Sing Sing prison from 1941 until 1944. Highly regarded for his integrity, Kirby brought respect back to the administration of Sing Sing, and order to the prison after the often controversial tenure of Lewis Lawes.

== Biography ==
Kirby was born on October 20, 1889, in Beekmantown, New York, to dairy farmer Edward A. Kirby and his wife Bridget G. (Loughan) Kirby. He entered state service in October, 1909 as a $22-per-month hospital attendant at Dannemora State Hospital, and in 1911 was appointed Prison Guard at Great Meadow Correctional Facility in Comstock, New York. He remained there until 1917, when he left State Corrections to operate the family farm due to his father's illness.

Upon his father's death in 1920, Kirby returned to the New York State Department of Correctional Services as a Prison Guard at Clinton Correctional Facility in Dannemora, New York. On March 1, 1928, he was named Sergeant of the Guard at Clinton.

Upon its opening on September 1, 1931, Kirby was appointed Principal Keeper at Attica Correctional Facility, where, despite a prison population as high as 2,286, there was never a prison escape during his decade-long tenure.

Kirby was named Warden of Sing Sing Correctional Facility by New York Governor Herbert Lehman on July 1, 1941, following the resignation of Lewis Lawes. At the time of his appointment, New York State Corrections Commissioner John A. Lyons termed Kirby as "the most outstanding prison man in the state", according to the Buffalo Courier-Express. The Batavia Times reported of Kirby that "many stated they had never heard a man leaving an institution with so many friends among the officials and also the high regard of the inmates of the prison."

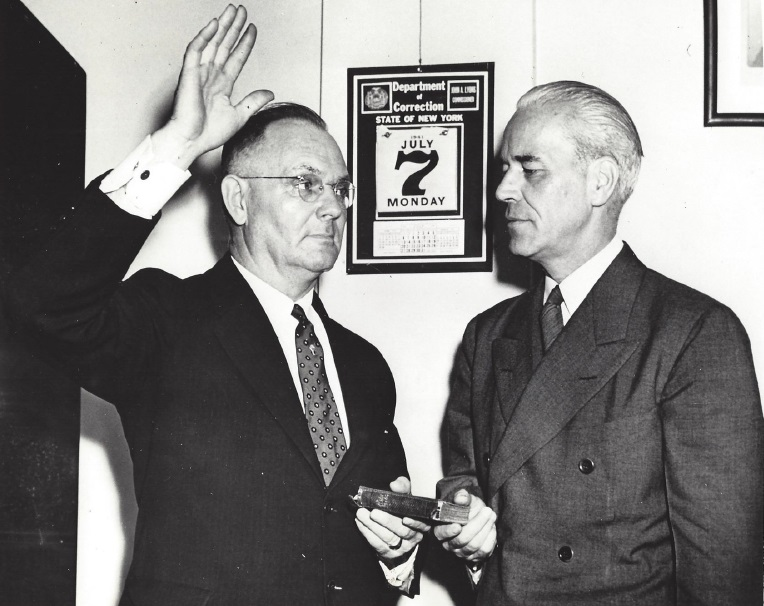
Robert J. Kirby being sworn in as Warden of Sing Sing Prison by John A. Lyons, Commissioner of Corrections, July 7, 1941.

Robert Kirby would serve as Warden of Sing Sing Prison from 1941 through 1944. Staunchly against capital punishment, he took over the reins at a prison that would ultimately execute 614 prisoners before the state banned capital punishment in 1972. During his tenure he would preside over the executions of 33 inmates, including those of Frank Castellano, Anthony and William Esposito, Edward Haight, Joseph Mascari, and Murder, Inc. conspirators Harry Maione and Frank Abbandando.

Kirby contracted pneumonia in early January, 1944. Although his condition was initially considered serious, his infection had reportedly cleared up and he was "considerably improved and his complete recovery was expected." However, late in the evening of January 15, he took a turn for the worse. Soon after, with nurses and his physician at his bedside, he raised his right hand, made the sign of the cross, and died.

"The high principles of humanitarianism which Warden Kirby brought to the Wardenship won for him the commendation of all those Interested in penology and sociology," expressed Chauncey E. Long, Commander of the American Legion, upon Kirby's death.

Kirby was laid to rest at Saint Vincent Cemetery in Attica, New York, on January 19, 1944.

== Popular culture ==
Warden Kirby was portrayed by Ben Taggart in the 1942 crime drama Escape from Crime.
