= Carolina League (1936–1938) =

- Sport: Baseball
- Founded: 1936
- Folded: 1938
- No. of teams: 6–8
- Country: USA
- Last champions: Valdese Textiles, Kannapolis Towelers, Concord Weavers

The Carolina League was an "outlaw" professional baseball league in the Piedmont region of North Carolina. Drawing from the textile mills and milling towns in that region, the league was independent, meaning that it was not a part of the National Association of Professional Baseball Leagues, the body that governed minor-league baseball during the league's lifetime. The Carolina League was the successor to the short-lived 1935 Carolina Textile League.

== History ==
The league's independent status led to the league being branded as an "outlaw" league by supporters of the NAPBL, and the league's practice of allowing players to freely leave their contracts to play for teams in other leagues, was unorthodox at the time. Additionally, players on various teams were often given year-round no-show jobs in the team owners' various mills with salaries that supplemented their earnings from baseball. There was no cap to salaries for Carolina League players, and there were no limits to how many players with professional experience could play on any given team, a sharp difference from previous "mill leagues".

This added incentive caused several players in NABPL leagues to moonlight as Carolina League players, often under assumed names. When caught by NABPL officials, moonlighting players were often banned from play in NAPBL leagues, effectively putting on hold or ending their professional careers. Professional players such as Fred Archer and Vince Barton did stints with the Carolina League while on hiatus from Major League Baseball.

In addition, the NAPBL combatted the insurgent influence of the Carolina League by installing an eight-team class-D league, the North Carolina State League in towns near Carolina League teams. The league folded in 1938 due to pressure from "organized" baseball, and many of the league's players went on to play in NABPL leagues, with some, such as Dick Culler and Grey Clarke going on to achieve prominence in the major leagues.

== Teams ==
Carolina League Teams
- Concord: Concord Weavers, 1936–38
- Charlotte: Charlotte Hornets, 1936
- Forest City: Forest City/Rutherford County Owls, 1936
- Gastonia: Gastonia Spinners, 1937–38
- Hickory: Hickory Rebels, 1936–38
- Kannapolis: Kannapolis Towelers, 1936–38
- Lenoir: Lenoir Finishers, 1937–38
- Mooresville: Mooresville Moors, 1936
- Salisbury: Salisbury Colonials, 1936
- Shelby: Shelby Cee Cees, 1936
- Valdese: Valdese Textiles, 1936–38

== Champions ==
The following teams were champions of the Carolina League:

| Year | Team |
|---|---|
| 1936 | Valdese Textiles |
| 1937 | Concord Weavers |
| 1938 | Lenoir Finishers |
