= Pilot Mill =

Historic district in North Carolina, United States

- U.S. National Register of Historic Places
- U.S. Historic district
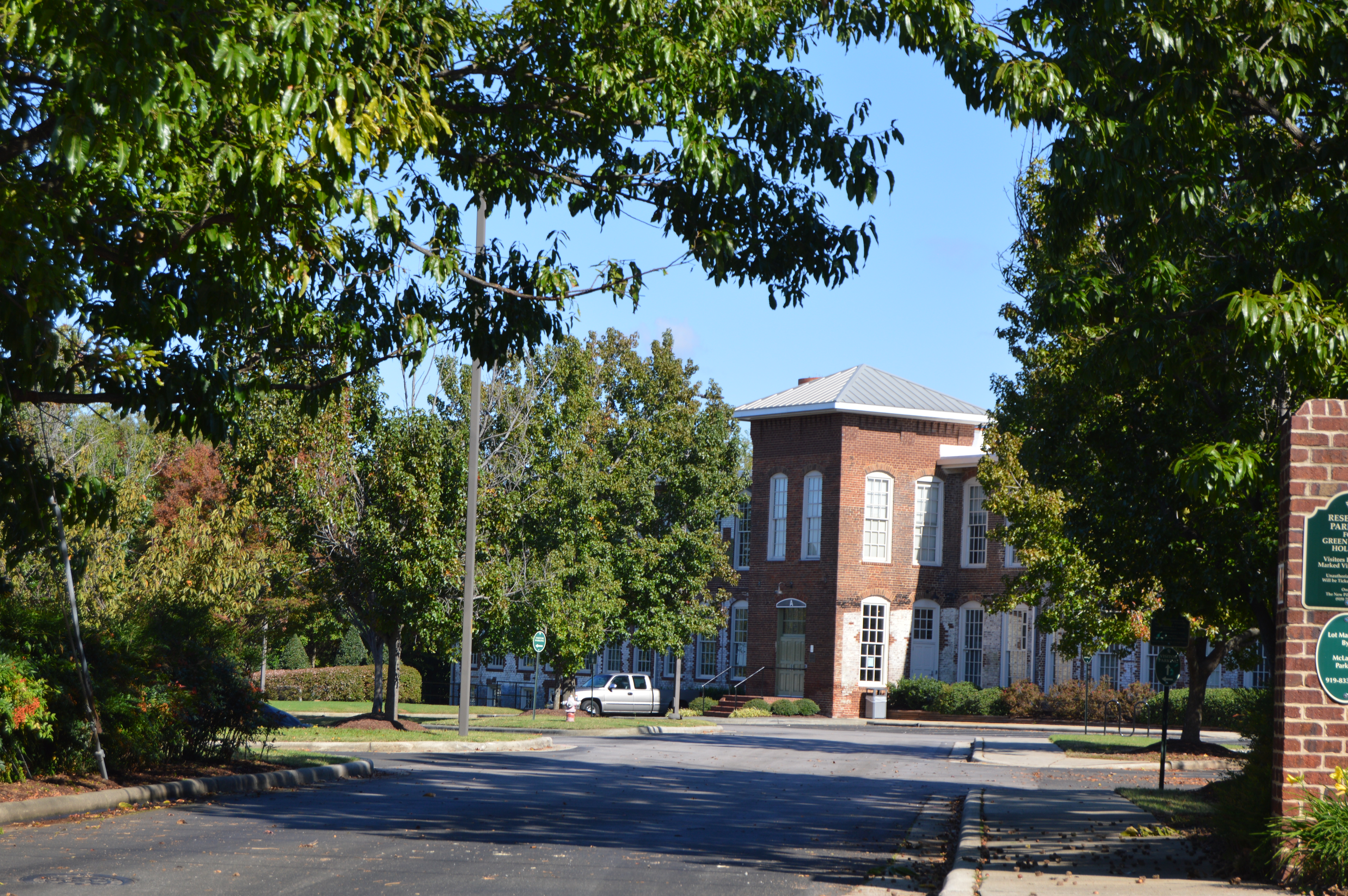
- Property entrance

- Location within North Carolina Location within the United States
- Location: 1121 Haynes St., Raleigh, North Carolina
- Coordinates: 35°47′43″N 78°38′17″W
- Area: 5.7 acres (2.3 ha)
- Built: 1894
- Architectural style: Classical Revival
- NRHP reference No.: 89000441
- Added to NRHP: June 5, 1989

Pilot Mill is a historic textile mill complex located at Raleigh, Wake County, North Carolina. The original building was built in 1894, and is a two-story, vernacular brick structure, 33 bays long and 7 bays wide. The upper windows are arched and the building has a three-story, square, corner tower. The building was extended sometime before 1903 and again prior to 1914. The other contributing buildings include the one-story dye house (c. 1896, c. 1914, c. 1917); a two-story connecting structure (c. 1920); and two-story, Classical Revival style office, shipping and inspection building (c. 1910). The mill operated until 1982.

It was listed on the National Register of Historic Places in 1989.
