= Joe Palmisano (baseball) =

American baseball player (1902-1971)

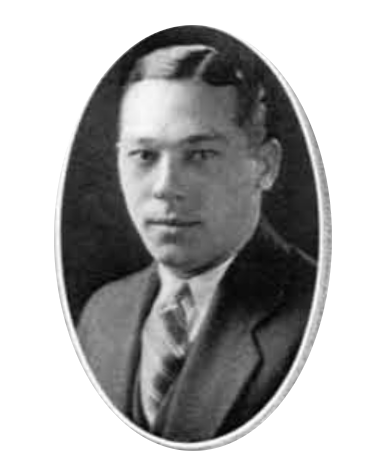
- Catcher
- Born: November 19, 1902; West Point, Georgia, U.S.
- Died: November 5, 1971 (aged 68); Albuquerque, New Mexico, U.S.
- Batted: Right Threw: Right

MLB debut
- May 31, 1931, for the Philadelphia Athletics

Last MLB appearance
- September 25, 1931, for the Philadelphia Athletics

MLB statistics
- Batting average: .227
- Home runs: 0
- Runs batted in: 4
- Stats at Baseball Reference

Teams
- Philadelphia Athletics (1931)

Joseph Palmisano (November 19, 1902 – November 5, 1971) was an American professional baseball player. He was a catcher for one season (1931) with the Philadelphia Athletics, compiling a .227 batting average in 44 at-bats, with four runs batted in.

An alumnus of the Georgia Institute of Technology, he was born in West Point, Georgia and died in Albuquerque, New Mexico at the age of 68.
