= North Carolina State League =

Former professional baseball league

- Formerly: Carolina Association
- Classification: Class D (1913–1917, 1937–1942, 1945–1952)
- Sport: Minor League Baseball
- First season: 1913
- Folded: 1952
- Replaced by: Tar Heel League
- President: Joseph H. Wearn (1913); Arthur Lyon (1914–1915); William G. Bramham (1916–1917); Gene Lawing (1937–1938); C. M. Llewellyn (1939–1942, 1945–1946); R. A. Collier (1947–1948); Frank Spencer (1949); Robert A. Collier (1950); Walter H. Woodson (1951–1952)
- No. of teams: 22
- Country: United States of America
- Most titles: 5 Thomasville/High Point-Thomasville
- Related competitions: Carolina League

The North Carolina State League was a Class D level league in Minor League Baseball. The original version of the league played from 1913 to 1917 as the successor to the Carolina Association. The second version of the league was established in 1937 in part in order to compete with the Piedmont-region independent league, the Carolina League, and ran through 1953 when it combined with the Western Carolina League to form the Tar Heel League.

== Cities represented ==
=== 1913–1917 ===
- Asheville, NC: Asheville Mountaineers 1913–1915; Asheville Tourists 1916–1917
- Charlotte, NC: Charlotte Hornets 1913–1917, moved from Carolina Association 1908–1912
- Durham, NC: Durham Bulls 1913–1917
- Greensboro, NC: Greensboro Patriots 1913–1917, moved from Carolina Association 1908–1912
- Raleigh, NC: Raleigh Capitals 1913–1917
- Winston-Salem, NC: Winston-Salem Twins 1913–1917, moved from Carolina Association 1908–1912

=== 1937–1942, 1945–1952 ===
- Albemarle, NC: Albemarle Rockets 1948
- Concord, NC: Concord Weavers 1939–1942, 1945–1948; Concord Nationals 1949–1950; Concord Sports 1951
- Cooleemee, NC: Cooleemee Weavers 1937–1938; Cooleemee Cools 1939; Cooleemee Cards 1940–1941
- Elkin, NC: Elkin Blanketeers 1951–1952
- Gastonia, NC: Gastonia Cardinals 1938, moved to Tar Heel League 1939–1940
- Hickory, NC: Hickory Rebels 1942, 1945–1951, moved to Western Carolina League 1952
- High Point, NC & Thomasville, NC: High Point-Thomasville Hi-Toms 1948–1952, moved to Tar Heel League 1953
- Kannapolis, NC: Kannapolis Towelers 1939-1941
- Landis, NC: Landis Sens 1937-1939; Landis Dodgers 1940; Landis Senators 1941; Landis Millers 1942, 1945–1947; Landis Spinners 1949–1951
- Lexington, NC: Lexington Indians 1937–1942; Lexington A's 1945–1948; Lexington Indians 1949; Lexington A's 1950; Lexington Indians 1951–1952, moved to Tar Heel League 1953
- Mooresville, NC: Mooresville Moors 1937–1942, 1946–1952, Mooresville Braves (1945), moved to Tar Heel League 1953
- Newton, NC & Conover, NC: Newton-Conover Twins 1937–1938, moved to Tar Heel League 1939–1940
- Salisbury, NC: Salisbury Bees 1937–1938; Salisbury Giants 1939–1942; Salisbury Pirates 1945–1952
- Shelby, NC: Shelby Cardinals 1937–1938
- Statesville, NC: Statesville Owls 1942; Statesville Cubs 1945–1946; Statesville Owls 1947–1952
- Thomasville, NC: Thomasville Chairmakers 1937; Thomasville Orioles 1938; Thomasville Tommies 1939–1942; Thomasville Dodgers 1945–1947; see High Point
