= Mooresville Mill Village Historic District =

Historic district in North Carolina, United States

- U.S. National Register of Historic Places
- U.S. Historic district
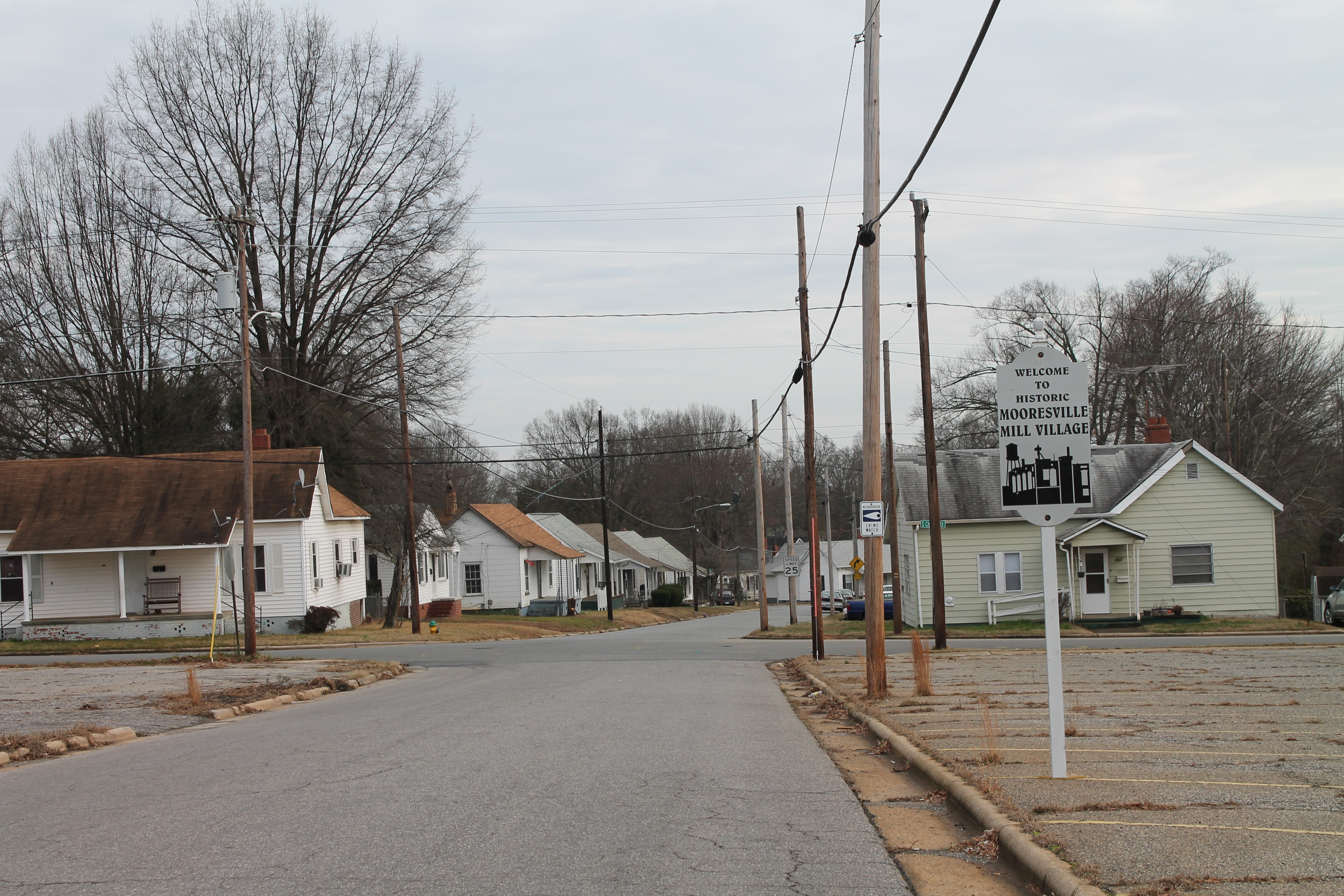

- Location within North Carolina Location within the United States
- Location: Bounded by Wilson, Cauldwell, Kennette, Lutz, Messeck, & Catawba Aves., Smith & Bruce, Streets, & Shearers Rd., in Mooresville, North Carolina
- Coordinates: 35°34′35″N 80°48′59″W
- Area: 160 acres (65 ha)
- Architectural style: Craftsman, Colonial Revival
- MPS: Iredell County MRA
- NRHP reference No.: 12000238
- Added to NRHP: April 24, 2012

Mooresville Mill Village Historic District is a national historic district located at Mooresville, Iredell County, North Carolina. It was listed on the National Register of Historic Places in 2012.

== History of the site ==
The mill village was built by the Mooresville Cotton Mills in the early 20th century to house local workers. Like many mill villages of the south, Mooresville Mill Village was a self-sufficient village within the town limits of Mooresville. Between 1902 and 1930, over 400 homes were built to provide housing for the influx of workers coming to work at the cotton mill.

A variety of floor plans were built over the time of construction. The earliest homes, shown on the 1902 and 1908 Sanborn maps of Mooresville, were mainly 3-room, T-shaped houses with front and back porches. In 1916–17, the mill added 4- and 5-room houses. Architectural styles represented are American Craftsman and Colonial Revival.

The village also provided boarding houses and services for its residents. A church, a school, a band hall, and stores all appear on the early Sanborn maps.
