= Junie Barnes =

American baseball player (1911–1963)

- Pitcher
- Born: December 1, 1911; Linwood, North Carolina, U.S.
- Died: December 31, 1963 (aged 52); Jacksonville, North Carolina, U.S.
- Batted: Left Threw: Left

MLB debut
- September 12, 1934, for the Cincinnati Reds

Last MLB appearance
- September 21, 1934, for the Cincinnati Reds

MLB statistics
- Win–loss record: 0–0
- Earned run average: 0.00
- Strikeouts: 0
- Stats at Baseball Reference

Teams
- Cincinnati Reds (1934)

Junie Shoaf "Lefty" Barnes (December 1, 1911 – December 31, 1963) was an American professional baseball pitcher who played in two games for the Cincinnati Reds in 1934. He attended Wake Forest University. When Barnes played with the Reds in 1934, he was one of three players (Beryl Richmond and Sherman Edwards were the other two) who were not assigned a uniform number.
