= Tony Daniels (baseball) =

American baseball player (1923–2005)

- Second baseman
- Born: December 28, 1923; Gastonia, North Carolina, U.S.
- Died: July 23, 2005 (aged 81); Statesville, North Carolina, U.S.
- Batted: Right Threw: Right

MLB debut
- June 12, 1945, for the Philadelphia Phillies

Last MLB appearance
- September 16, 1945, for the Philadelphia Phillies

MLB statistics
- Batting average: .200
- Home runs: 0
- Runs batted in: 10
- Stats at Baseball Reference

Teams
- Philadelphia Phillies (1945)

Frederick Clinton Daniels (December 28, 1923 – July 23, 2005) was an American professional baseball player, a second baseman for one season (1945) with the Philadelphia Phillies. He compiled a career .200 batting average in 230 at-bats, with ten runs batted in. He was born in Gastonia, North Carolina, and died in Statesville at the age of 81.
