= Landis Spinners =

US minor league baseball team

- 1935–1951; (1935, 1937–1942, 1945–1947, 1948–1951); Landis, North Carolina

Minor league affiliations
- Previous classes: Class D
- League: North Carolina State League (1937–1941, 1945–1951)
- Previous leagues: North Carolina State League (1937–1941, 1945–1951)

Major league affiliations
- Previous teams: Brooklyn Dodgers (1940)

Minor league titles
- League titles: 2 (1945, 1950)

Team data
- Previous names: Landis Spinners (1949–1951); Landis Millers (1945–1948); Landis Senators (1941–1942); Landis Dodgers (1940); Landis Senators (1937–1939)
- Previous parks: Landis Park

The Landis Spinners (also known as the Senators, Dodgers and Millers) were a Class D minor league baseball team in Landis, North Carolina that existed from 1935–1951. They were a regional predecessor of today's Kannapolis Intimidators.

== History ==
Landis played in the North Carolina State League (1937–1941, 1945–1947, 1949-1951). They were affiliate of the Brooklyn Dodgers in 1940.

During their existence, they were known as the Landis Spinners (1949–1951), Landis Millers (1945–1947), Landis Senators (1941–1942), Landis Dodgers (1940) and Landis Senators (1935, 1937–1939).

On July 18, 1951, the franchise moved to Elkin, North Carolina and became the Elkin Blanketeers.

== The ballpark ==
Landis teams played home games at Landis Park at Landis High School. Today, the school is Corriher-Lipe Middle School, located at 214 W. Rice St. Landis, NC 28088.

== Notable alumni ==
- Ed Clary (1940)
- Herman Fink (1940)
- Rufe Gentry (1939)
- Jim Poole (1939, MGR)
