= Landis, North Carolina =

- Town
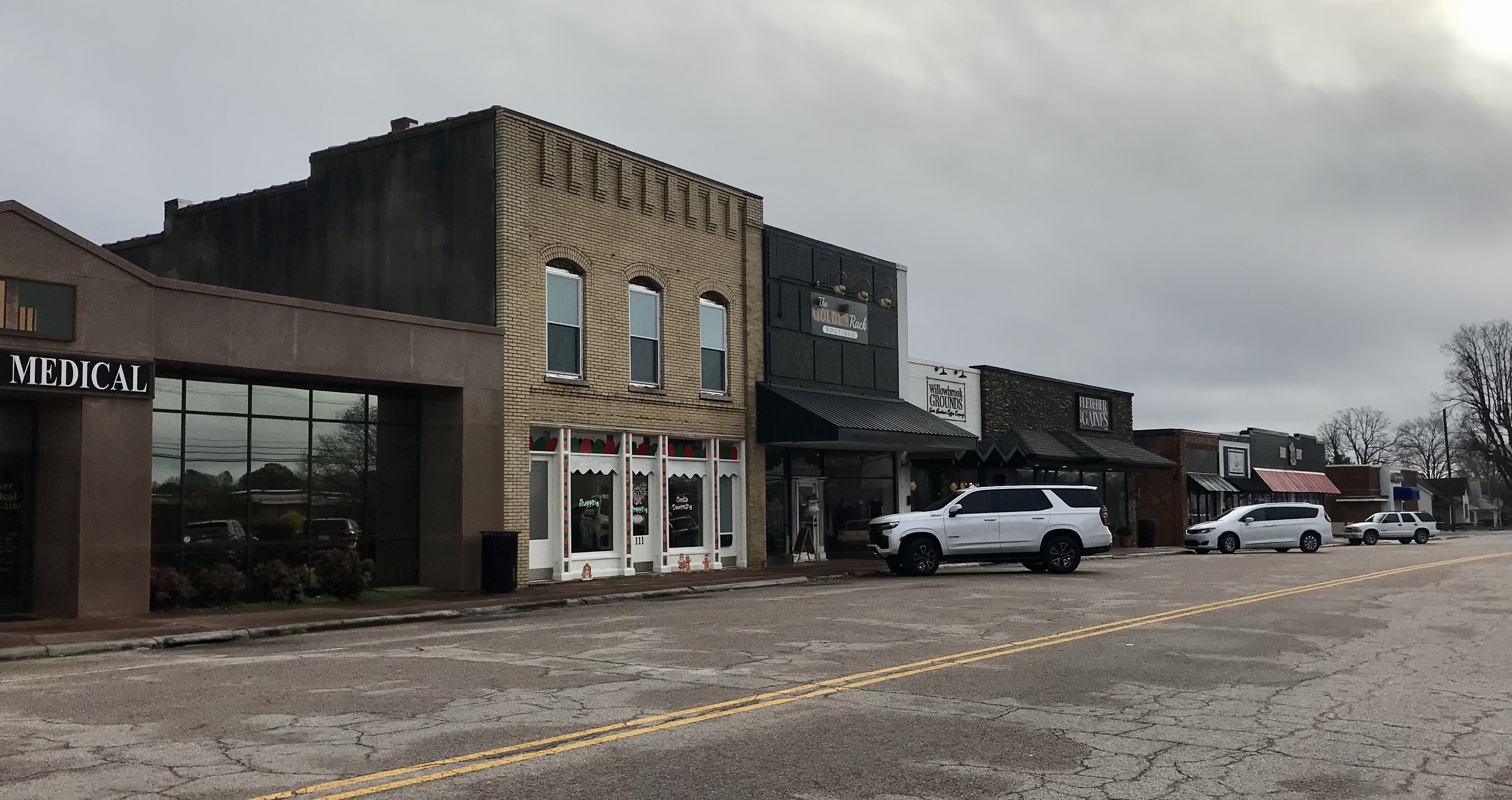
- Central Avenue

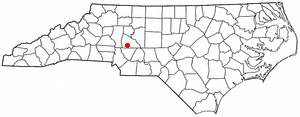
- Location of Landis, North Carolina
- Coordinates: 35°32′53″N 80°36′41″W
- Country: United States
- State: North Carolina
- County: Rowan

Government
  - Type: Manager-Council Form Of Government
  - Mayor: Meredith Bare Smith
  - Town Manager: Michael D. Ambrose

Area
  - Total: 3.47 sq mi (8.99 km^{2})
  - Land: 3.38 sq mi (8.75 km^{2})
  - Water: 0.093 sq mi (0.24 km^{2})
- Elevation: 853 ft (260 m)

Population (2020)
  - Total: 3,690
  - Density: 1,091.8/sq mi (421.55/km^{2})
- Time zone: UTC-5 (Eastern (EST))
  - Summer (DST): UTC-4 (EDT)
- ZIP code: 28088
- Area codes: 704, 980
- FIPS code: 37-36860
- GNIS feature ID: 2405983
- Website: www.townoflandis.com

Landis is a town in Rowan County, North Carolina, United States. At the 2020 census, its population was 3,109. The town is located just north of Kannapolis and south of China Grove.

== History ==
Landis was incorporated in 1901 and began as a textile town, with its largest mill being Linn Mill Company.

== Demographics ==
Historical population
Census	Pop.	Note	%±
1910	437		—
1920	972		122.4%
1930	1,388		42.8%
1940	1,650		18.9%
1950	1,827		10.7%
1960	1,763		−3.5%
1970	2,297		30.3%
1980	2,092		−8.9%
1990	2,333		11.5%
2000	2,996		28.4%
2010	3,109		3.8%
2020	3,690		18.7%
2021 (est.)	3,168	▼	−14.1%
U.S. Decennial Census

=== 2020 census ===
As of the 2020 census, Landis had a population of 3,690. The median age was 39.4 years. 21.5% of residents were under the age of 18 and 16.1% of residents were 65 years of age or older. For every 100 females there were 89.8 males, and for every 100 females age 18 and over there were 89.1 males age 18 and over.

98.0% of residents lived in urban areas, while 2.0% lived in rural areas.

There were 1,501 households in Landis, of which 31.2% had children under the age of 18 living in them. Of all households, 49.8% were married-couple households, 16.5% were households with a male householder and no spouse or partner present, and 27.1% were households with a female householder and no spouse or partner present. About 25.1% of all households were made up of individuals and 10.9% had someone living alone who was 65 years of age or older.

There were 1,639 housing units, of which 8.4% were vacant. The homeowner vacancy rate was 2.2% and the rental vacancy rate was 8.2%.

Landis racial composition
Race	Number	Percentage
White (non-Hispanic)	2,764	74.91%
Black or African American (non-Hispanic)	334	9.05%
Native American	25	0.68%
Asian	38	1.03%
Pacific Islander	2	0.07%
Other/Mixed	176	4.77%
Hispanic or Latino	353	9.57%

== Education ==
Children in Landis are zoned for Landis Elementary School, Corriher-Lipe Middle School, and South Rowan High School (Landis. Rowan-Cabarrus Community College is 3.7 miles south of Landis in the nearby town of Kannapolis and is the closet institution of higher education, followed by Shaw University's CAPE Center, North Carolina Research Campus, Ambassador Christian College, and Livingstone College.

== Notable person ==
- Billy Ray Barnes, former professional American football player and coach
