= Cooleemee Cards =

Minor league baseball team in North Carolina, US

- 1937–1941; Cooleemee, North Carolina

Minor league affiliations
- Previous classes: Class D
- League: North Carolina State League

Major league affiliations
- Previous teams: St. Louis Cardinals (1940–1941); Brooklyn Dodgers (1938)

Team data
- Previous names: Cooleemee Cards (1940–1941); Cooleemee Cools (1939); Cooleemee Weavers (1937–1938)

The Cooleemee Cards were a Minor League Baseball team, based in Cooleemee, North Carolina, United States, that operated in the North Carolina State League between 1937 and 1941.

They were known as the Cooleemee Weavers in 1937 and 1938 and the Cooleemee Cools in 1939 before becoming an affiliate of the St. Louis Cardinals in 1940.

== Year-by-year record ==
Year	Record	Finish	Manager	Playoffs
1937	45-67	7th	O. Coulter / Walt Purcey	
1938	42-68	7th	Joe Bird	
1939	49-62	6th	Blackie Carter	
1940	27-84	8th	Boyce Morrow / Dutch Dorman	
1941	28-72	8th	Fred Hawn / Charles Martin	
