= Salisbury, North Carolina minor league baseball teams =

Minor league baseball teams based in Salisbury, North Carolina, United States

Salisbury
- 1905–1968; (1905, 1925–1929, 1935–1942, 1945–1953, 1960–1966, 1968); Salisbury, North Carolina

Minor league affiliations
- Previous classes: Class A (1963–1966, 1968); Class D (1937–1942, 1945–1953, 1960–1962); Class C (1925–1929); Class D (1905)
- League: Western Carolinas League (1960–1966, 1968)
- Previous leagues: Tar Heel League (1953); North Carolina State League (1937–1942, 1945–1952); Carolina Baseball League (1935–1936); Piedmont League (1925–1929); Virginia-North Carolina League (1905)

Major league affiliations
- Previous teams: Washington Senators (1968); Houston Astros (1965–1966); Los Angeles Dodgers (1963–1964); New York Mets (1962); Houston Colt .45s (1961); Boston Red Sox (1953); Pittsburgh Pirates (1945–1951); New York Giants (1939–1942); Boston Braves (1937–1938)

Minor league titles
- League titles: 4 (1927, 1941, 1960, 1964, 1965)

Team data
- Previous names: Salisbury Senators (1968); Salisbury Astros (1965–1966); Salisbury Dodgers (1963–1964); Salisbury Braves (1960–1962); Salisbury Rocots (1953); Salisbury Pirates (1945–1952); Salisbury Giants (1939–1942); Salisbury Bees (1936–1938); Salisbury-Spencer Colonials (1926–1929); Salisbury Colonials (1925); Salisbury-Spencer Twins (1905)

Several different minor league baseball teams were based in Salisbury, North Carolina, between 1905 and 1968.

The first was the Salisbury-Spencer Twins, who represented both Salisbury and Spencer, North Carolina, and operated in the Virginia-North Carolina League for part of the 1905 season before moving to Winston-Salem, North Carolina, and becoming the Winston-Salem Twins.

== Piedmont League ==
The Salisbury Colonials joined the Piedmont League in 1926, and became the Salisbury-Spencer Colonials the following season. They won the Piedmont League championship in 1927 and lasted through 1929.

== Franchise History ==
=== Salisbury Bees ===
The Salisbury Bees played in the Carolina Baseball League in 1935 and 1936 before becoming a Class-D affiliate of the Boston Braves in 1937 and joining the North Carolina State League. They were managed by Blackie Carter in both 1937 and 1938 and finished fifth in the league both years.

=== Salisbury Giants ===
The New York Giants took over the affiliation agreement in 1939 and changed the name Salisbury Giants. Under manager Johnnie Heving they won the NC State League title in 1941. This version of the team suspended operations in 1942 because of World War II.

=== Salisbury Pirates ===
The Salisbury Pirates were a North Carolina State League baseball team based in Salisbury, North Carolina, USA, that played from 1945 to 1952 and who were affiliated with the Pittsburgh Pirates from 1945 to 1951.

=== Salisbury Rocots ===
In 1953, as a Boston Red Sox affiliate known as the Salisbury Rocots, they played for one season in the Tar Heel League under manager Sheriff Robinson and finished in 8th place in the league.

=== Salisbury Braves ===
The Salisbury Braves were a minor league baseball team in Salisbury, North Carolina, during the 1960–1962 seasons. They played in the Western Carolinas League and were affiliates of the Houston Colt .45s in 1961, and the New York Mets in 1962.

=== Year-by-year record ===
Year	Record	Finish	Manager	Playoffs
1960	65-35	2nd	Larry Taylor	League Champs
1961	64-38	1st	Alex Cosmidis	Lost in 1st round
1962	52-44	2nd	Harvey Stratton	none

=== Salisbury Dodgers ===
The Salisbury Dodgers were a minor league baseball team from Salisbury, North Carolina. They played in the Western Carolinas League as an affiliate of the Los Angeles Dodgers during the 1963 and 1964 seasons. They were managed by George Scherger and won the league championship in 1964.

=== Salisbury Astros ===
The Salisbury Astros, a Houston Astros affiliate, succeeded the Dodgers and played in 1965 and 1966. On June 19, 1965, the team took over first place in the Western Carolinas League after winning a game pitched by prospect Jay Dahl. That night, Dahl was riding in a car with pitcher Gary Marshall and a female passenger. The car crashed, Dahl was killed and Marshall was blinded due to severe eye injuries. The 1965 team won its league with a 70–48 win–loss record. The team featured several future major league players, including Bob Watson, who hit 12 home runs. The 1966 team struggled to a 44–77 record.

=== Salisbury Senators ===
The Washington Senators took over the affiliation agreement in 1968 and the Salisbury Senators The Senators were last in the six-team league, 20 games worse than #5 Rock Hill. The poor play of Salisbury enabled 4 of the 5 other teams to have winning percentages over .550. The club went 17–41 in the first half and 17–46 in the second half under Billy Klaus. 24,072 fans showed up, putting them fifth in attendance. Unsurprisingly, the team had no All-Stars. They were last in offense (474 runs), hitting .224 overall, and allowed over 200 more runs than Rock Hill, giving up 808 (team ERA of 5.34).

== Notable Salisbury alumni ==
- Jack Billingham (1962) MLB All-Star
- Bobby Del Greco (1950)
- Tom Grieve (1968)
- Don Heffner (1929)
- Johnnie Heving (1942)
- Bob Hooper (1942)
- Jerry Johnson (1962)
- Buck Jordan (1925–1926)
- Fred Stanley (1966)
- Bob Watson (1965) 2 × MLB All-Star
