= Hickory Rebels =

- 1935–1960; (1939–1942, 1945–1954, 1960); Hickory, North Carolina

Minor league affiliations
- Previous classes: Class D
- Previous leagues: Western Carolina League (1952, 1960); Tar Heel League (1939-1940, 1953-1954); North Carolina State League (1942, 1945–1951)

Major league affiliations
- Previous teams: New York Giants (1945–1949); Chicago Cubs (1952–1954)

Minor league titles
- League titles: 2 (1954)

Team data
- Previous names: Hickory Rebels (1939–1940, 1942, 1945–1954, 1960)
- Previous parks: Fairgrounds Park

The Hickory Rebels were a Class D minor league baseball team based in Hickory, North Carolina, that played from 1939–1940, 1940, 1945–1954, 1960. The Rebels were the predecessor of the current Hickory Crawdads in the South Atlantic League.

== History ==
The Rebels played in the Tar Heel League (1939–1940, 1953–1954), North Carolina State League (1942, 1945–1951) and Western Carolinas League (1952, 1960). They were affiliates of the New York Giants (1945–1949) and Chicago Cubs (1952–1954). A former team of the same name had participated in the independent Carolina League between 1936 and 1938.

== The ballpark ==
The Rebels played at Fairgrounds Park. Fairgrounds Park is now called Henkel-Alley Field and serves as home to American Legion baseball and the Catawba Valley Community College Red Hawks.

== Notable alumni ==
- John Buzhardt (1954)
- Red Corriden (1949)
- Eddie Haas (1953)
- Mickey O'Neil (1949)
