= Charlotte County Redfish =

- 2007; Port Charlotte, Florida

Minor league affiliations
- Class: Independent
- League: South Coast League

Minor league titles
- League titles: None

Team data
- Colors: Red, navy, light blue, white, gold, gray
- Ballpark: Charlotte County Stadium
- General manager: Steve Tricarico
- Manager: Cecil Fielder; Jackie Hernández (Games 1-25)

The Charlotte County Redfish were a short-lived minor league baseball team based in Port Charlotte, Florida. The club was a member of the South Coast League and played their home games at Charlotte County Stadium. The club was slated to have 45 home games, however the Redfish played host to nine more when the Bradenton Juice were not permitted to use Robert C. Wynn Baseball Field after just four home dates.

The Redfish began the season managed by Jackie Hernández, who had helped the Pittsburgh Pirates win the 1971 World Series. However Hernández was replaced after just managing 25 games for the Redfish. He was replaced by the team's hitting coach, former Detroit Tigers star Cecil Fielder. During the final three games of the season Tampa Bay Devil Rays outfielder Elijah Dukes served as first base coach during a suspension by the Devil Rays. However the Redfish finished in last place during both halves of the season, and 12 games behind the 5th place Anderson Joes. The club then folded with the league at the end of the season.

== 2007 season ==
| Half | Record | Finish | GB | League Standing |
|---|---|---|---|---|
| 1st | 12-33 | .267 | 21.5 | 6th |
| 2nd | 12-32 | .273 | 16 | 6th |
| Total | 24-65 | .270 | -- | 6th |
