= Paul Eames Sports Complex =

Baseball stadium in Albany, Georgia

- Interactive map of Paul Eames Sports Complex
- Location: Ball Park Lane; Albany, Georgia
- Coordinates: 31.600944°N 84.129878°W
- Owner: City of Albany, Georgia
- Operator: City of Albany, Georgia
- Capacity: 3,000

Construction
- Opened: 1993
- Cost: $4.5 million

Tenants
- South Georgia Peanuts (SCL) (2007); South Georgia Waves (SAL) (2002); Albany Alligators (AAA) (2001); Albany Polecats (SAL) (1992-1995); Albany Quails (PL) (2010)

The Paul Eames Sports Complex is a minor league baseball stadium, located in Albany, Georgia. The stadium was the home of the South Georgia Peanuts, of the South Coast League, prior to the folding of the league in 2008. It was also the home of the Albany Polecats, the Albany Alligators, and the South Georgia Waves, who later moved to Columbus, Georgia to become the Columbus Catfish. The complex was known as Polecat Park when the Polecats team played there.

The Colorado Silver Bullets, an all-female professional baseball team, played a number of games at the complex as a "home team" in the 1995 and 1996 seasons.

As of November 2024 the complex was for sale after not hosting a professional team since 2008 and was used primarily by three local high school teams.
