= Robert Wynn =

Robert Wynn may refer to:

- Robert Wynn (MP) (died 1598), MP for Caernarfon, 1588
- Robert Wynn (soldier) (1921–2000), U.S. Army soldier
- Robert C. Wynn Baseball Field, Bradenton, Florida
- Michael Wynn, 7th Baron Newborough (Robert Charles Michael Vaughan Wynn, 1917–1998), British peer

== See also ==
- Robert Wynne (disambiguation)
