= Charlotte Sports Park =

Baseball stadium in Florida, US

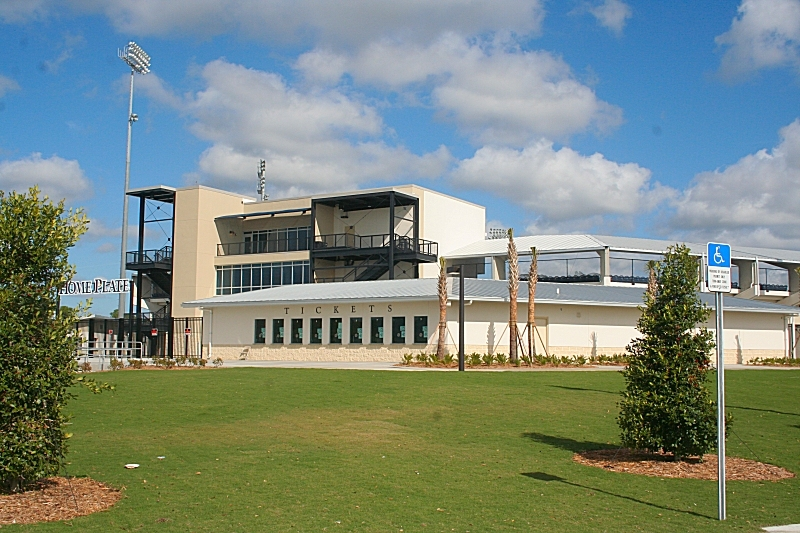
- Charlotte Sports Park in January 2009, nearing completion of renovation
- Interactive map of Charlotte Sports Park
- Location: 2300 El Jobean Road; Port Charlotte, FL 33948
- Coordinates: 26°59′57″N 82°10′54″W
- Owner: Charlotte County
- Operator: Charlotte County
- Capacity: 7,670
- Surface: Grass
- Field size: Left Field: 343 ft Left-Center Field: 384 ft Center Field: 414 ft Right-Center Field: 384 ft Right Field: 343 ft

Construction
- Groundbreaking: July 20, 1986
- Opened: March 6, 1987
- Renovated: 2008–09
- Cost: $5 million ($14.2 million in 2025 dollars) $27.2 million (renovation) ($40.8 million in 2025 dollars)
- Architect: Populous
- Structural engineers: Bliss & Nyitray, Inc (renovation)
- General contractor: Gilbane Building Co.

Tenants
- Tampa Bay Rays (MLB) (Spring Training) (2009–present); Charlotte Stone Crabs (FSL) (2009–2020); FCL Rays (FCL) (2009–present); Texas Rangers (MLB) (Spring Training) (1987–2002); Charlotte County Redfish (SCL) (2007); Charlotte Rangers (FSL) (1987–2002)

Charlotte Sports Park (formerly known as Charlotte County Stadium and Ranger Stadium) is a baseball stadium in Port Charlotte, Florida. The stadium is the home field for Tampa Bay Rays spring training operations, as well as its Rookie-class Florida Complex League Rays teams. From 2009 to 2020, it also hosted the Charlotte Stone Crabs of the Class A-Advanced Florida State League.

Originally built in 1987, the main stadium underwent a renovation that was completed in January 2009 at a cost of $27 million.

Prior to the Rays, the stadium was home to Texas Rangers spring training exhibition games and the team's minor league affiliate Charlotte Rangers. The ballpark has also hosted college baseball tournaments and the South Coast League Charlotte County Redfish.

== Stadium features ==
Charlotte Sports Park has a variety of amenities including a playground area, a boardwalk from foul pole to foul pole, two grass berms for general seating, and a tiki bar. The stadium features four air conditioned suites on the second floor and team store. The third floor of the stadium houses a 17-seat press box, the media dining center, PA booth, camera well, and four broadcast booths. The stadium sits on a complex that also includes five full practice fields, a half field for infield drills, and indoor batting cages.

In March 2014, Charlotte Sports Park was named the #1 spring training destination by the readers of USA Today and 10Best.

== History ==
In the spring of 1993, Texas Rangers pitcher Nolan Ryan announced his retirement from the clubhouse at the stadium.

During the 1994 Spring Training, the Rangers played host to the Chicago White Sox who featured basketball star Michael Jordan. The game drew a record crowd and was one of only a few sites in Florida to host Jordan.

In 2000, after signing an unprecedented 10-year deal worth $252 million with the Texas Rangers, slugger Alex Rodriguez held a press conference with the sports media at the stadium. The stadium was unable to accommodate the significant number of news reporters. In an effort to allow enough room for reporters to speak to Rodriguez, the press conference was held on the roof of the Rangers' dugout, a clear sign that the Rangers had outgrown the facility. They would leave 2 years later.

The Rays opened Spring Training at the renovated stadium on February 14, 2009. They lost their first Spring Training game to the Cincinnati Reds on February 25, 7–0. Their first Spring Training home win came on February 27, a 12–4 win over the Boston Red Sox.

On February 3, 2010, the Rays announced a naming rights deal with The Mosaic Company. The agreement was reported to last through 2024, however due to a potential conflict-of-interest with Charlotte County—whom ultimately must approve the name change—the Rays asked for more time to study the proposal before giving it to the county commissioners for final approval. On February 17, due to intense opposition by both the Charlotte County Council and local residents, the Rays announced they were abandoning the deal with Mosaic and will potentially look at other companies in the future instead.

The Rays cancelled 2023 spring training at Charlotte Sports Park due to damage from Hurricane Ian, moving exhibition games to Tropicana Field. The team announced that the Rays’ Major League camp would muster at the ESPN Wide World of Sports Complex, then relocate to St. Petersburg at the beginning of March, while Tampa Bay's Minor League camp would remain at the Orlando complex all spring.

The stadium has also been used by the local community for non-baseball events like concerts, festivals, and expos. It has hosted such musicians as Kenny Rogers, The Beach Boys, The Little River Band, and Simple Plan.

== Retired Number 405 ==
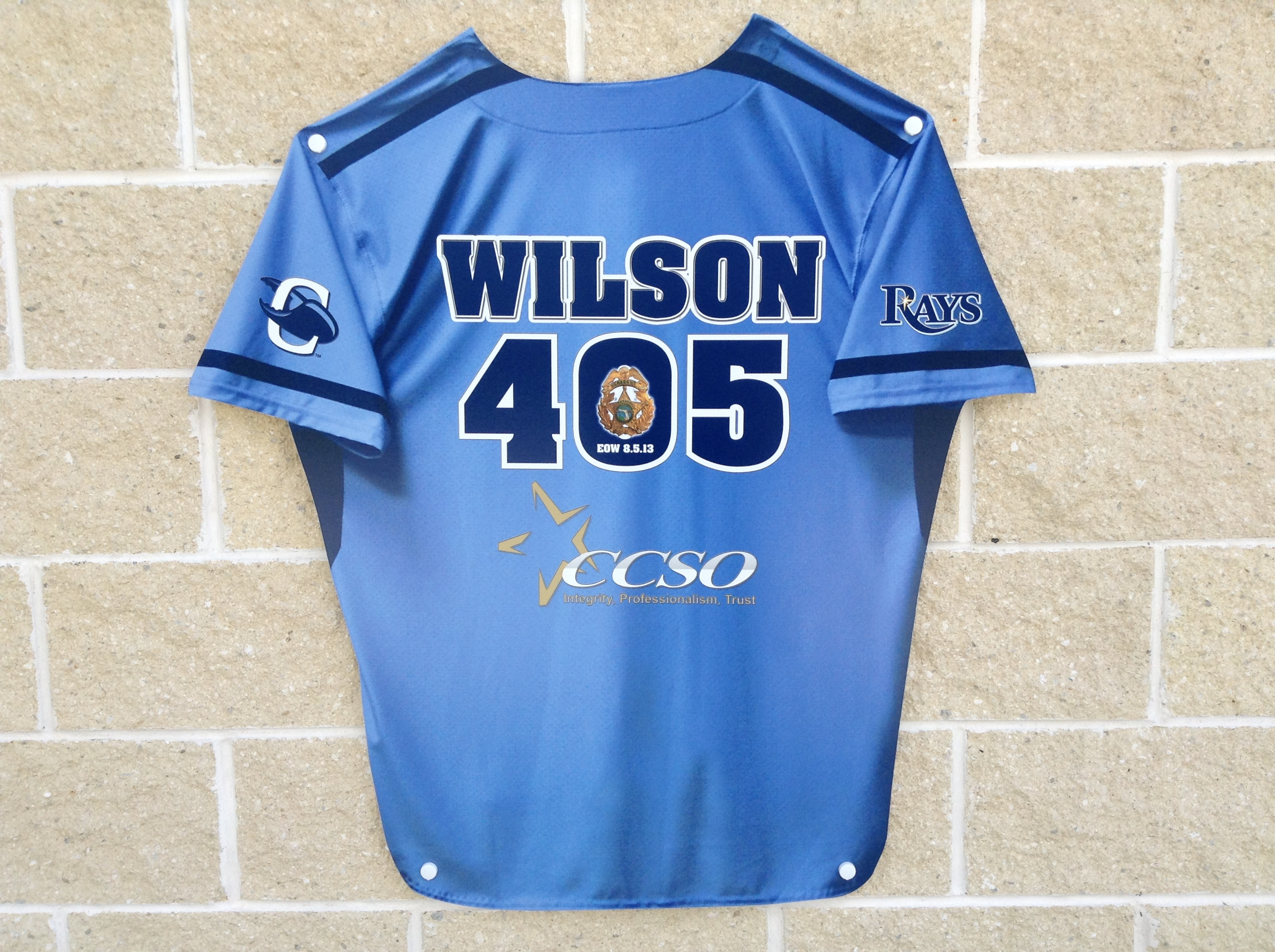
Sgt. Wilson Jersey

Number 405 is "retired" at Charlotte Sports Park which was the radio number that belonged to Sgt. Michael Wilson. Sgt. Wilson was a member of the Charlotte County Sheriff's Department for 21 years and was killed while responding to a domestic disturbance call on August 5, 2013. The community rallied around the Wilson family and turned out in thousands holding signs and waving flags as the funeral procession drove by. On August 13, 2014, the Charlotte Stone Crabs retired Sgt. Wilson's 405 during a pre-game ceremony, with the Wilson family unveiling the jersey shaped sign. The number now hangs just inside the Home Plate gate.

The interior of Charlotte County Stadium during warm-up prior to a spring training game, Tampa Bay Rays vs. Cincinnati Reds, 2009-02-25
