= Anderson Memorial Stadium =

Stadium in Anderson, South Carolina

Coordinates: 34°28′57.932″N 82°37′43.03″W

- Interactive map of Anderson Memorial Stadium
- Location: Anderson, South Carolina
- Capacity: 5300

Construction
- Opened: 1970
- Cost: $ million

Tenants
- Anderson Trojans (NCAA) (1985-present); Anderson Joes (SCL) (2007); Anderson Braves (SAL) (1980-1984); Anderson Rangers (WCL) (1975); Anderson Mets (WCL) (1974); Anderson Tigers (WCL) (1973); Anderson Giants (WCL) (1972); Anderson Senators (WCL) (1970-1971)

Anderson Memorial Stadium is a stadium in Anderson, South Carolina. It is primarily used for baseball and was the home of the Anderson Braves from 1980 to 1984, and the Anderson Joes in 2007. It is currently the home of Anderson University's baseball team, but is owned by the City of Anderson.

The ballpark has a capacity of 2,500 people and opened in 1970. The stadium had bleacher type seats and the box seats consisted of folding metal chairs. The stadium was originally home to the minor league Anderson Senators class A team. After the Senators left town, other teams were the Anderson Tigers, the Anderson Giants, the Anderson Mets, and the Anderson Rangers. Willie Mays visited the city in the summer of 1974 as part of a goodwill tour as a roving ambassador and coach with the New York Mets franchise.

The stadium became the home of the Anderson Braves in 1980 when they moved from Greenwood, South Carolina. The team was quickly a big success. The team seemed to gain more enthusiastic crowds given the connection and close proximity to Atlanta and the Braves franchise. 1984 was the last season for the Braves at Memorial Stadium; they moved to Sumter, South Carolina at the end of 1984. The Stadium became the home of the Anderson College (now Anderson University) baseball team. The city-owned stadium became run-down.

In 2007, the stadium had a rebirth. A new independent baseball team named the Anderson Joes came to town. Much work was done on the stadium. It was completely restored, rewired and had major plumbing work done. New seats and a new snack bar were also added. Sadly, the team and the league folded into bankruptcy and the stadium is once again empty except for Anderson University baseball games.
