= Chris Bando =

American baseball player and manager (born 1956)

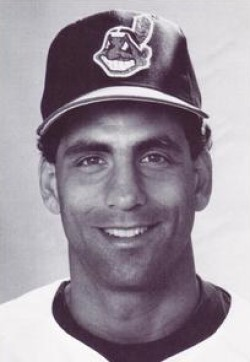
- Catcher
- Born: February 4, 1956 (age 70); Cleveland, Ohio, U.S.
- Batted: Switch Threw: Right

MLB debut
- August 13, 1981, for the Cleveland Indians

Last MLB appearance
- October 1, 1989, for the Oakland Athletics

MLB statistics
- Batting average: .227
- Home runs: 27
- Runs batted in: 142
- Stats at Baseball Reference

Teams
- Cleveland Indians (1981–1988); Detroit Tigers (1988); Oakland Athletics (1989)

Christopher Michael Bando (born February 4, 1956) is an American former professional baseball catcher. He played in Major League Baseball (MLB) in the 1980s, spending most of his career with the Cleveland Indians before playing for the Detroit Tigers and Oakland Athletics. He managed the Texas AirHogs of the American Association of Independent Professional Baseball.

== Career ==
=== As player ===
Born in Cleveland, Ohio, Bando attended Arizona State University, where he played college baseball for the Arizona State Sun Devils baseball team. He hit the game winning home run in the championship game of the 1977 College World Series (CWS). He was chosen as the best catcher in the CWS during the 1970s.

In the 1978 MLB draft, Bando was selected by the Cleveland Indians as their second round pick. He began his minor league career that year with the Chattanooga Lookouts, batting .228 with four home runs and 21 runs batted in (RBIs) in 76 games. Bando also spent the following two seasons with the Lookouts, Cleveland's AA affiliate. In 1979, he played in only 21 games, posting a .242 batting average and driving in seven runs. His number of appearances jumped by a hundred the next year, as he saw action in 121 games for Chattanooga in 1980. His batting average also rose significantly, as he hit .349 for the season, while homering 12 times and collecting 73 RBIs.

In 1981, Bando played in 96 games for Cleveland's triple-A team, the Charleston Charlies. He batted .306, connected for 11 home runs and drove in 45 runners. Bando saw his first Major League action that fall. In 21 games for Cleveland, he had a .213 batting average and was the team's starting catcher eight times.

For the 1982 season, Bando remained with the Indians. In his second year in the majors, his batting average (.212) was nearly the same as it had been the previous year. Bando played in 66 games, connected for three home runs and drove in 16 runs. His first Major League homer came on July 9, when he hit a two-run shot off Seattle's Floyd Bannister.

In his third Major League season, Bando saw his batting average jump to .256 in 48 games of action. He hit four home runs, three of which came in June, and he totaled 15 RBIs. He was also caught stealing in his first Major League stolen base attempt.

In 1984, Bando appeared in the Indians starting lineup as catcher 59 times. He posted a .291 batting average, 12 home runs and 41 RBIs, all of which were his MLB career-highs. He also appeared in 29 games for the Maine Guides, Cleveland's AAA affiliate.

Bando's offensive numbers dropped substantially in 1985, as he batted .139 with no homers and 13 RBIs in 73 games for Cleveland.

In 1986, Bando saw action in a career-high 92 games for the Indians. His batting average jumped to .268, he hit two home runs and he drove in 26 runs.

The following season, Bando's average dropped to .218 in 89 games. He had five homers and 16 RBIs.

Bando began 1988 with Cleveland, but he was released in August after batting .125 in 32 games. He joined the Detroit Tigers in September and saw action in one game. Bando also made a single appearance with the Oakland Athletics the following year. It was the final game of his Major League career.

=== As coach, scout, and manager ===
Bando has over 30 years in professional baseball and player development, where he has ample experience as a player, scout, coach, and manager. He spent 10 years as a Minor League manager for the Milwaukee Brewers and Cleveland Indians and was voted the Best Minor League Managing Prospect by Baseball America in 1994 and in 1995 was voted the #2 Manager Prospect by Major League General Managers. Bando's career record as an affiliated Minor League manager is 561–500. Bando was formerly the manager of the Aiken Foxhounds of the South Coast League in 2007, the league's only year of operation. For three years he served as the Third Base coach and Bench coach for the Milwaukee Brewers and he also was the manager of the Washington Wild Things of the independent Frontier League in 2012. Bando has also been a Major League pro scout for the Milwaukee Brewers and an Advanced scout for the Arizona Diamondbacks.

== Personal life ==
Chris is the brother of Sal Bando. Chris attended Solon High School in Solon, Ohio.
