= Cecil Fielder =

American baseball player (born 1963)

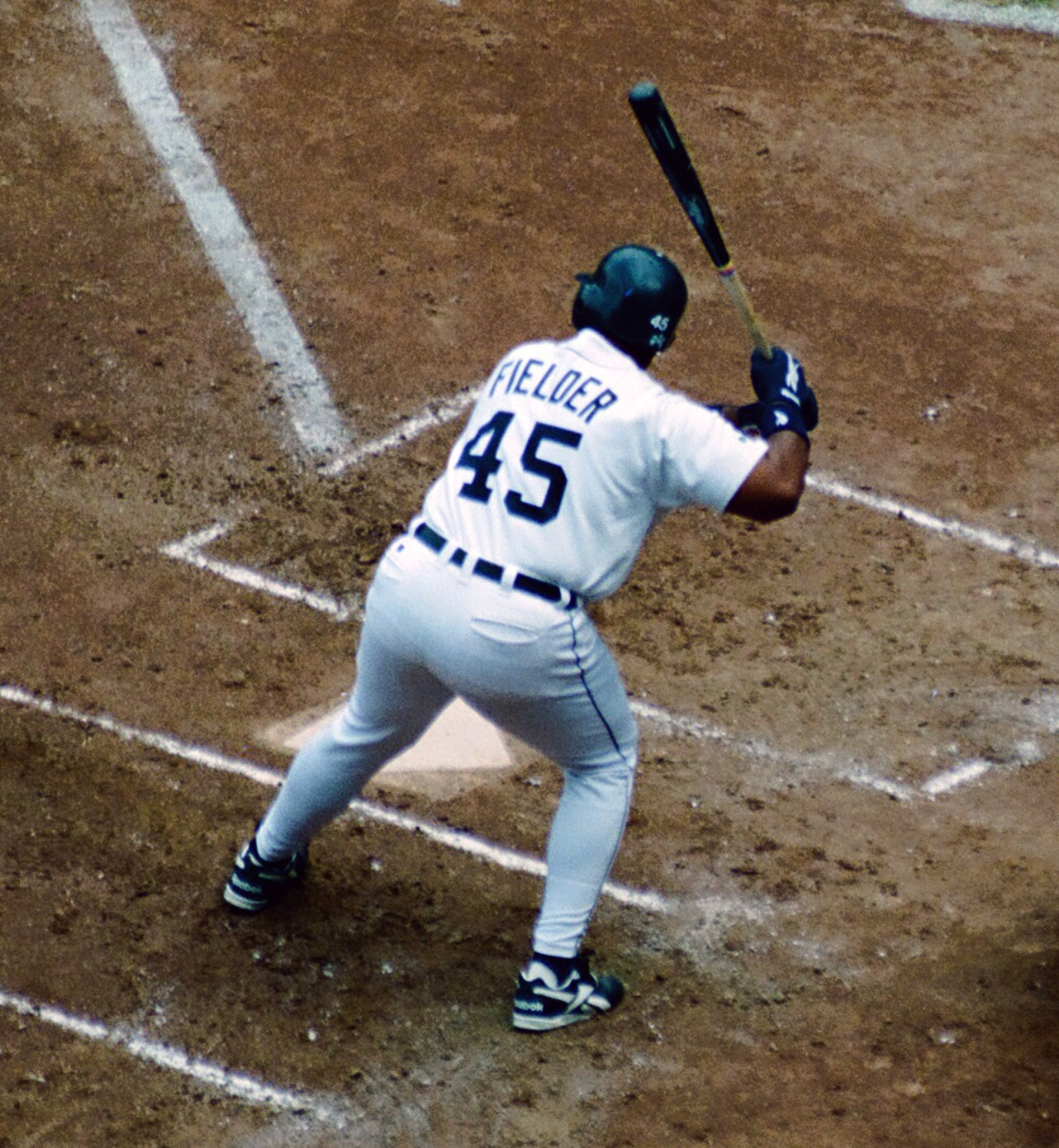
- Fielder in 1996
- First baseman / Designated hitter
- Born: September 21, 1963 (age 63); Los Angeles, California, U.S.
- Batted: Right Threw: Right

Professional debut
- MLB: July 20, 1985, for the Toronto Blue Jays
- NPB: April 8, 1989, for the Hanshin Tigers

Last appearance
- NPB: September 14, 1989, for the Hanshin Tigers
- MLB: September 13, 1998, for the Cleveland Indians

MLB statistics
- Batting average: .255
- Home runs: 319
- Runs batted in: 1,008

NPB statistics
- Batting average: .302
- Home runs: 38
- Runs batted in: 81
- Stats at Baseball Reference

Teams
- Toronto Blue Jays (1985–1988); Hanshin Tigers (1989); Detroit Tigers (1990–1996); New York Yankees (1996–1997); Anaheim Angels (1998); Cleveland Indians (1998)

Career highlights and awards
- 3× All-Star (1990, 1991, 1993); World Series champion (1996); 2× Silver Slugger Award (1990, 1991); 2× AL home run leader (1990, 1991); 3× AL RBI leader (1990–1992)

Cecil Grant Fielder (/ˈsɛsəl/; born September 21, 1963) is an American former professional baseball designated hitter and first baseman in Major League Baseball (MLB). Fielder was a power hitter in the 1980s and 1990s. He attended college at the University of Nevada, Las Vegas (UNLV). He played in MLB for the Toronto Blue Jays (1985–1988), in Japan's Central League for the Hanshin Tigers (1989), and then in MLB for the Detroit Tigers (1990–1996), New York Yankees (1996–97), Anaheim Angels in 1998, and Cleveland Indians in 1998. With the Yankees, he won the 1996 World Series over the Atlanta Braves. In 1990, he became the first player to reach the 50–home run mark since George Foster hit 52 for the Cincinnati Reds in 1977 and the first American League player to do so since Mickey Mantle and Roger Maris famously hit 54 and 61 in 1961.

He is the father of Prince Fielder, who similarly established himself as a premier power hitter during his career. The Fielders are the only father and son to both have 50-home run seasons in MLB history, and were the only father–son duo to have 40–home run seasons until 2021, when they were joined by Vladimir Guerrero Jr. and his father.

== Early career ==
Fielder attended Nogales High School in La Puente, California. He was named an All-American while playing for the school's baseball team in 1981. He enrolled at the University of Nevada, Las Vegas (UNLV), where he played for the UNLV Rebels baseball team. Fielder was drafted by the Baltimore Orioles in the 31st round (767th overall) of the 1981 Major League Baseball draft, but did not sign. He was drafted by the Kansas City Royals in the fourth round (67th overall) of the 1982 MLB draft, and this time did sign. In 1983, Fielder was traded to the Toronto Blue Jays for Leon Roberts.

The Blue Jays promoted Fielder to the major leagues on July 18, 1985. He became a part-time first and third baseman for the Blue Jays, sharing playing time with Willie Upshaw and Fred McGriff. Fielder hit .243 with 31 home runs and 84 runs batted in (RBIs) across four seasons with the team, earning $125,000 in his final season.

== Hanshin Tigers ==
The Hanshin Tigers of Nippon Professional Baseball's Central League signed Fielder after the 1988 season, paying him $1.05 million, including a chauffeur and a full-time interpreter. More than the money, he said, he went to Japan for the opportunity to play every day. In the beginning of spring training, Fielder had a difficult time adjusting to Japan's baseball culture, but with the help of Tiger manager Minoru Murayama and Junichi Kashiwabara, he became adjusted to the new environment. The Tigers offered Fielder the position of cleanup hitter, and he became a hero to the local baseball fans, who nicknamed him "Wild Bear" (wild, in Japan, is the image of power; bear, for his hulking presence). Fielder batted .302 and hit 38 home runs and 81 RBIs for Hanshin in 1989.

== Detroit Tigers ==
Prior to the 1990 season, Fielder signed a two-year, $3 million contract with the Detroit Tigers. In his first season with the Tigers, Fielder hit .277 while leading the major leagues with 51 home runs and 132 RBIs in 159 games. On the last day of the Tigers' season at Yankee Stadium, Fielder hit his 50th and 51st home runs to become the 11th player in MLB history — and only the second in the previous 25 years — to reach the 50-home-run plateau. No Tigers player had turned the mark since Hank Greenberg slugged 58 in 1938, and no Tiger player has reached 50 home runs since. It was the bright spot on a team that finished with just 79 wins, with Fielder being the first player to hit 50 home runs on a team with a losing record since Ralph Kiner in 1949.

Fielder, whose previous high mark was 14 with Toronto in 1987, provided a sudden and unexpected emergence as a legitimate slugger. In addition to home runs and RBIs, Fielder also led the majors in slugging percentage (.592) and strikeouts (182), and he led the American League in total bases (339). After the season, he finished as the runner-up for the AL MVP Award. In 1990, Fielder also became the ninth major leaguer to record two three-home run games in a season.

Fielder enjoyed a successful second season with the Tigers in 1991, batting .261 with 44 home runs and 133 RBIs in 162 games. He again led the majors in home runs and RBIs, and joined Hank Greenberg (1937–38) as the only Tiger players at that time to hit 40 or more homers in consecutive seasons (Miguel Cabrera joined Fielder and Greenberg in 2012–13). Fielder was the runner-up in the AL MVP balloting for the second consecutive year.

Prior to the 1992 season, Fielder avoided salary arbitration by agreeing to a one-year, $4.5 million contract, which at the time set a record for highest salary by an arbitration-eligible player. Fielder responded by hitting 35 home runs and leading the league in RBIs (124) for the third consecutive season, becoming the first American Leaguer since Babe Ruth to do so.

During the 1990s, Fielder built a reputation for clutch hitting and power, though the Tigers continued to be no better than mediocre. His team's fates possibly hurt him with MVP voters. Rickey Henderson and Cal Ripken Jr. narrowly edged him for the AL's MVP Award in 1990 and 1991, respectively. His new fans in Detroit nicknamed him "Big Daddy" for his big smile, peaceful temperament, and prodigious home runs (as well as his massive physical stature).

In his six-year tenure with Detroit, Fielder had four consecutive 30-homer and 100-RBI seasons. He had 28 home runs and 90 RBIs in 109 games during the 1994 season before it was ended by a player strike, denying him a chance to extend his accomplishments to a fifth season. He also became the first Tiger to hit at least 25 home runs in six consecutive seasons. No player in Detroit history hit as many over a six-year period (219) until Miguel Cabrera hit 227 in 2008–13, and no major league player had more home runs between 1990 and 1995.

Fielder was a member of the All-Star Team in 1990, 1991, and 1993, and was named "Tiger of the Year" by the Detroit chapter of the Baseball Writers' Association of America in 1990, 1991, and 1992. He is the only player to receive the award three consecutive years.

In 1993, Fielder signed a five-year, $36 million contract with the Tigers; which made him the highest-paid player in baseball for two seasons (1995 and 1996).

Fielder had a reputation for being a slow baserunner. In 1996, he set a major league record by taking 1,096 games to record his first career stolen base, which occurred on a botched hit and run. He stole another base that season, as well, and finished his career with two stolen bases over 13 seasons and 1,470 games. Fielder also had a reputation as a below-average fielder, mostly caused by his poor speed and range. He was, however, considered a competent defensive first baseman when it came to putouts and digging infield assists out of the dirt.

Fielder's massive power was exemplified by two long home runs:

- He was one of only four players, and the only Tiger, to homer over the left-field roof at Tiger Stadium (the other three are Harmon Killebrew, Frank Howard, and Mark McGwire). He hit the homer off Oakland Athletics pitcher Dave Stewart on August 25, 1990.
- He also hit the only home run to ever travel completely out of Milwaukee County Stadium—during either the Braves' Milwaukee history (1953–1965) or Brewers' park history (1970–2000). It was hit off the Brewers' Dan Plesac on September 14, 1991.

Fielder played his final season for the Tigers in 1996, batting .248 with 26 home runs and 80 RBIs in 107 games before being traded.

== Later career ==
Fielder was traded to the New York Yankees on July 31, 1996, for Rubén Sierra and Matt Drews. He batted .260 with 13 home runs and 37 RBIs in 53 games with the Yankees. Fielder's acquisition was integral in the Yankees' World Series championship that year, as he won the Babe Ruth Award for most outstanding performance in the 1996 postseason. In 14 postseason games, Fielder hit .308 (16-for-52) with two doubles, three home runs, and 14 RBIs.

Despite requesting a trade at the end of the 1996 season, Fielder ultimately remained with the Yankees in 1997. On July 15, Fielder suffered a broken thumb after an awkward slide during a game against the Cleveland Indians, and the subsequent surgery caused him to miss eight weeks. He returned to the team on September 15. In 98 games, Fielder batted .260 with 13 home runs and 61 RBIs. In the 1997 American League Division Series, he recorded one hit in eight at-bats (.125) with one RBI in the Yankees' five-game series loss to Cleveland.

Fielder signed a one-year contract with the Anaheim Angels for the 1998 season. He was designated for assignment on August 6 of that year. At the time, he was hitting .241 with 17 home runs and 68 RBIs in 103 games. Fielder was released by the Angels on August 10, and signed with the Cleveland Indians four days later. He was released again on September 18 after batting .143 (5-for-35) with no RBI.

Fielder was signed by the Toronto Blue Jays before the start of the 1999 season. Despite batting .264 (14-for-53) with two doubles, a team-high three homers, and 11 RBIs in 17 spring training games, Toronto traded for Dave Hollins and Fielder was released once spring training wrapped. He subsequently retired.

Fielder batted .255, with 744 runs, 200 doubles, 319 home runs, 1,008 RBIs, and a .482 slugging average, drawing 693 walks for a .345 on-base percentage with two career stolen bases. As neither of his stolen bases came in the 1990 season, he held the single-season record for most home runs (51) without a single stolen base (later passed by Mark McGwire in 1996 and 1999, when he hit 52 and 65, respectively). He was inducted in the Kinston Professional Baseball Hall of Fame in 1994.

== Personal life ==
In 2004, The Detroit News reported that Fielder was suffering from domestic and gambling problems. They relied on court documents from Fielder's divorce and a lawsuit brought against him by Trump Plaza Hotel and Casinos in New Jersey describing debts to various casinos, credit-card companies, and banks. Fielder later filed a libel suit against Gannett, the parent company of The Detroit News, and the lead reporter, Fred Girard, accusing them of slander and defamation of character. The suit sought US$25 million in damages and fees. The trial court dismissed the suit and the Michigan Court of Appeals affirmed the decision.

Fielder's son Prince was a first baseman who played his career with the Milwaukee Brewers, Detroit Tigers, and Texas Rangers. Fielder was originally involved in his son's professional career, even negotiating his first contract. After a dispute as to whether Cecil should receive a typical agent's fee for negotiating the contract, Prince and his family were no longer on speaking terms with Cecil. In a 2012 interview, Cecil Fielder said that Prince and he had recently begun speaking again, and that their relationship was improving. On September 25, 2007, Prince hit his 50th home run of the season, making Cecil and Prince the only father/son duo in MLB history to each reach the milestone. The two each have 319 career home runs, and are tied for 126th on the career MLB home run list.

After managing the South Coast League's Charlotte County Redfish in 2007, Fielder became the manager of the Atlantic City Surf of the Canadian-American Association of Professional Baseball in 2008. In 2011, Fielder was named to the Torrington Titans advisory board.

In 2024, Fielder was inducted into the Michigan Sports Hall of Fame.

== See also ==
- 50 home run club
- List of Major League Baseball career home run leaders
- List of second-generation Major League Baseball players
- List of Major League Baseball career runs batted in leaders
- List of Major League Baseball annual runs batted in leaders
- List of Major League Baseball annual home run leaders
