= Roberto Hernandez Stadium =

Baseball stadium in Aiken, South Carolina

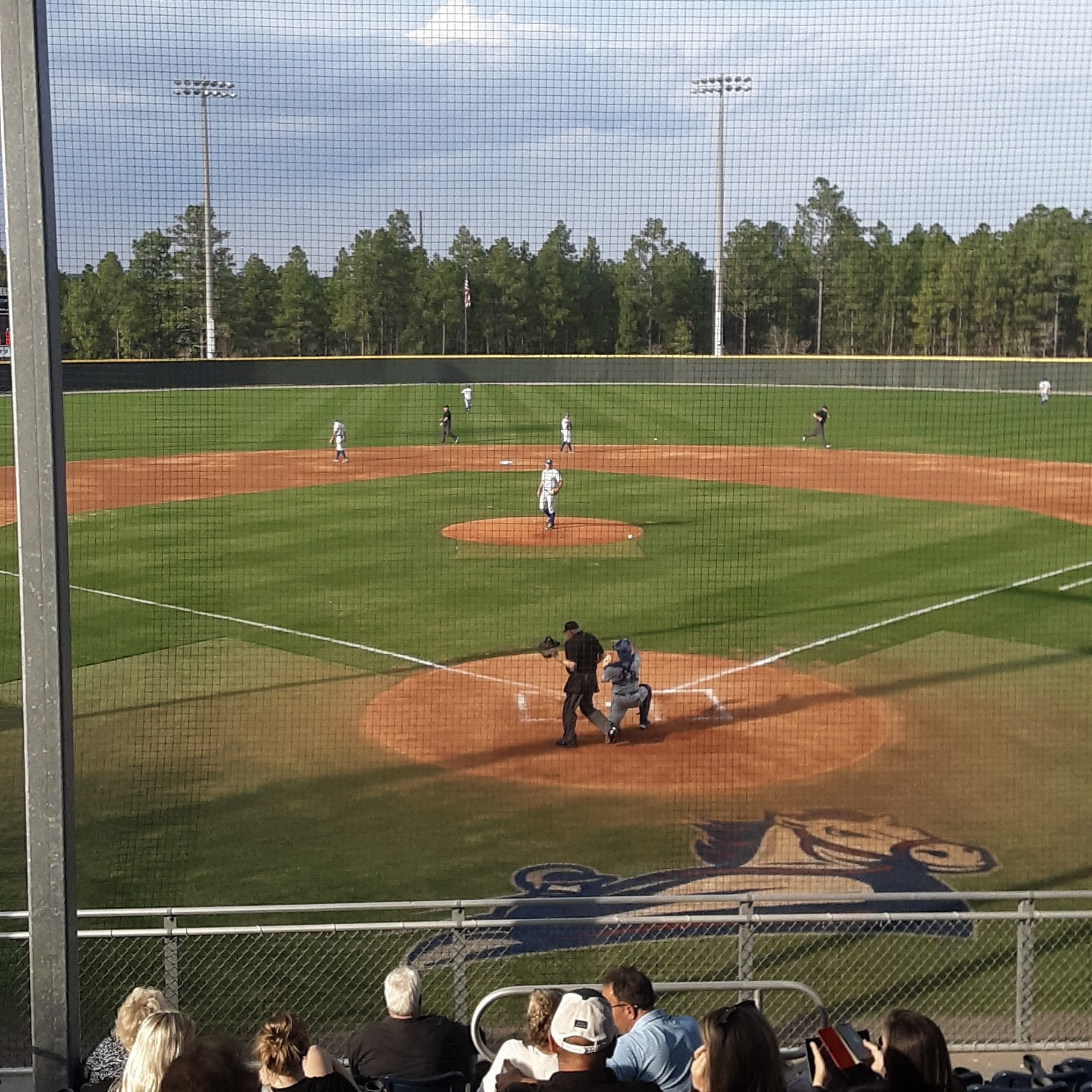
- Roberto Hernandez Stadium during a game in 2023
- Interactive map of Roberto Hernandez Stadium
- Location: 471 University Parkway; Aiken, South Carolina
- Coordinates: 33.574958°N 81.776197°W
- Owner: University of South Carolina Aiken
- Operator: University of South Carolina Aiken
- Capacity: 1,000
- Field size: Left Field - 330 feet (101 m); Center Field 400 feet (122 m); Right Field - 330 feet (101 m)

Construction
- Groundbreaking: 2003
- Opened: September 18, 2003
- Cost: $ million

Tenants
- USC Aiken Pacers (NCAA) (2003-present); Aiken Foxhounds (SCL) (2007-2008)

Roberto Hernandez Stadium is a former minor league and current collegiate baseball stadium, located in Aiken, South Carolina. It is currently the home of the USC Aiken Pacers. Built in 2003, the stadium was named after USC Aiken alumnus and former major league pitcher, Roberto Hernández. The stadium has a capacity of 1,000 and has a fully operational concession stand. The stadium also has a dedicated Hall of Fame to Hernandez, which contains several items of baseball memorabilia and awards belonging to him.

The stadium was briefly the home of the Aiken Foxhounds, of the South Coast League in 2007. The Foxhounds folded after the league went into bankruptcy and never returned.
