= Kash Beauchamp =

American baseball coach (born 1963)

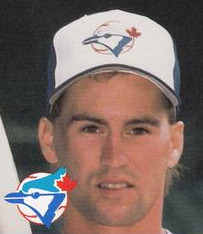
- Beauchamp with the Knoxville Blue Jays in 1988

Boise Hawks
- Outfielder / Coach
- Born: January 8, 1963 (age 63); Grove, Oklahoma
- Bats: Right Throws: Right
- Stats at Baseball Reference

James Kash Beauchamp (born January 8, 1963) is an American professional baseball coach and former outfielder. Prior to the 2025 season, he was named manager of the Boise Hawks. He was previously the hitting coach for the Lincoln Saltdogs of the American Association of Professional Baseball.

== Playing career ==
Beauchamp is the son of Major League Baseball player Jim Beauchamp. Beauchamp attended Grove High School in Oklahoma and then Bacone College.

Beauchamp played 12 seasons in the minors, seeing moderate success but never reaching the Majors, although he did get as high as Triple-A. He displayed good speed at the beginning of his professional career, stealing as many as 25 bases in a season, although as his career went on he stole less and less each year.

In 1984, he was the MVP of the Carolina League All-Star Game, going 5-for-6 with a home run, two triples and five RBI. He was voted Best Defensive Outfielder and Outfielder With the Best Arm that year by Baseball America.

Beauchamp was the first player to be signed to a professional (major league affiliated) contract out of the independent leagues when, after hitting .367 with the Rochester Aces of the Northern League in 1993, he was signed by the Cincinnati Reds.

== Coaching career ==
Beauchamp ended his playing career in 1995, and afterward he began managing and coaching various teams in different independent leagues. From 1995 to 1997, he was a hitting coach in the Montreal Expos farm system. From 1998 to 2000, he managed the New Jersey Jackals of the Northeast League. He managed the Lincoln Saltdogs in 2001 and then the Adirondack Lumberjacks for the next three seasons. He didn't manage in 2005, instead serving as the scouting director for the Golden Baseball League. During his time with the Golden League he was picked up as hitting coach for the Samurai Bears. He also had a role in the movie Season of the Samurai. He managed the Pensacola Pelicans of the American Association in 2006. In 2007, he served as Vice President/Director of Baseball Operations for the South Coast League. He also served as manager of the league's Anderson Joes franchise for the final 37 games of the 2007 season. Beauchamp left both positions in November 2007 to become manager of the Wichita Wingnuts of the American Association.

On July 9, 2008, Beauchamp had a major tirade, taking off his shoe and trying to make the umpire smell his shoe along with his armpit; he received a four-game suspension for his actions. His extreme emotional blowup, arguing the controversial call on behalf of his players, received national attention via major television networks and has become something of an internet sensation. At the end of the 2008 season, the Wingnuts decided not to retain Beauchamp as their manager.

Beauchamp was hired as the Arizona Diamondbacks’ Independent League Scout in 2017, and retained that role through the 2019 season.

In 2018, Beauchamp served as the hitting coach for the Southern Maryland Blue Crabs of the Atlantic League of Professional Baseball.

In November 2019, Beauchamp was hired as the hitting coach for the Winnipeg Goldeyes in the American Association, serving in that role for two seasons.

On November 23, 2021, the Ogden Raptors announced the hiring of Beauchamp as their next manager. He managed the team until the end of the 2023 season.

Beauchamp became the hitting coach of the Lincoln Saltdogs of the American Association in 2024.

== Personal life ==
Beauchamp appeared as a contestant in a 2001 episode of America's Funniest Home Videos.
