= Anderson Joes =

Former minor league baseball team

- 2007; Anderson, South Carolina

Minor league affiliations
- Class: Independent
- League: South Coast League

Minor league titles
- League titles: None

Team data
- Colors: Green, gray, gold, white
- Ballpark: Anderson Memorial Stadium
- Manager: Kash Beauchamp; Desi Wilson (Games 1-53)

The Anderson Joes were a minor league baseball club that existed in 2007. The team was based in Anderson, South Carolina and was named after outfielder Shoeless Joe Jackson, who grew up in the local area. The team played as a member of the independent South Coast League.

The Joes began the season with Desi Wilson, a former first baseman with the San Francisco Giants, serving as the team's manager. However, midway through the season, he left the position of manager and was activated as a player. He was then traded to the South Georgia Peanuts where he served as a player-coach for the remainder of the season. Wilson was replaced at the position by veteran minor league manager Kash Beauchamp.

The team finished their lone season at 5th place in the league standings, 12 games in front of the last place Charlotte County Redfish.

== 2007 season ==
Half	Record	Finish	GB	League Standing
1st	13-32	.289	20.5	5th
2nd	24-20	.545	4	3rd
Total	37-52	.416	--	5th
