= Columbus Catfish =

- 2003–2008; Columbus, Georgia
Team logo
Cap insignia

Minor league affiliations
- Class: Class A (2003–2008)
- League: South Atlantic League (2003–2008)

Major league affiliations
- Team: Los Angeles Dodgers (2003–2006); Tampa Bay Rays (2007–2008)

Minor league titles
- League titles (1): 2007

Team data
- Name: South Georgia Waves (2003); Columbus Catfish (2004–2008)
- Colors: Royal blue, black, tan, peach, white, green
- Mascot: Hook/Crash
- Ballpark: Golden Park (2003–2008)

The Columbus Catfish were a minor league baseball team in Columbus, Georgia. They were a Class A team in the South Atlantic League, and were an affiliate of the Tampa Bay Rays for the 2007 and 2008 seasons. They were known as the South Georgia Waves for the 2003 season. The Catfish relocated to Bowling Green, Kentucky for the 2009 season and are now known as the Bowling Green Hot Rods.

The Catfish played home games at Golden Park. The team colors were royal blue, peach, and sand. The name "Catfish" referred to the fish of the same name, which is commonly eaten in the South and is often harvested from the Chattahoochee River. The city of Columbus and Golden Park itself lie on the Chattahoochee. The peach in the Catfish logo indicates that they are from the state of Georgia and not the Columbus Clippers of Columbus, Ohio.

In 2007, the Catfish swept the West Virginia Power in three games to win their first South Atlantic League championship.

== History ==
The Catfish, then known as the Wilmington Waves as one of two South Atlantic League expansion teams in 2001, played their inaugural season in Wilmington, North Carolina, as an affiliate of the Los Angeles Dodgers. The team left Wilmington after one season due to the lack of a permanent stadium. The Waves moved to Albany, Georgia, for one season until settling in Columbus, which had lost the RedStixx prior to the 2003 season. The team was known as the South Georgia Waves during its single season in Albany and its first year in Columbus.

=== Relocation to Bowling Green ===
The team was sold to New Hampshire Fisher Cats owner Art Solomon in April 2008. Solomon would move the team to Bowling Green, Kentucky, for the 2009 season, where the team would be known as the Bowling Green Hot Rods.

=== Season-by-season records ===
Year	Parent club	League	Division	W–L	Win %	Place	Manager	Postseason	Attendance	Source
South Georgia Waves
2003	Los Angeles Dodgers	SAL	Southern	64-72	.471	6th	Dann Bilardello	-	30,565	
Columbus Catfish
2004	Los Angeles Dodgers	SAL	South	69-69	.500	3rd	Dann Bilardello	-	56,325	
2005	Los Angeles Dodgers	SAL	South	57-79	.419	8th	Travis Barbary	-	62,547	
2006	Los Angeles Dodgers	SAL	South	72-68	.514	4th	Travis Barbary	-	66,516	
2007	Tampa Bay Devil Rays	SAL	South	82-53	.607	2nd	Jim Morrison	Won 1st round 2-0 vs. Augusta; Won finals 3-0 vs. West Virginia	71,809	
2008	Tampa Bay Rays	SAL	South	67-69	.493	6th	Matt Quatraro	-	61,290	
Totals				411-410	.501				349,052	

== Notable events ==
- May 20, 2004: Catfish pitcher Chuck Tiffany pitched a 7-inning perfect game against the Greensboro Bats in game 2 of a doubleheader. Tommy Lasorda, Tiffany's boyhood idol, saw the performance.
- June 10, 2004: Catfish pitcher Julio Pimentel set all-time Columbus records, outdueling Rome Braves (and future Atlanta Braves) pitcher Chuck James by striking out the first 8 batters, and 16 total in game 1 (7 innings complete game) of doubleheader.
- September 13, 2007: Catfish defeat West Virginia Power 6–0 in game 3 to clinch their first South Atlantic league championship in a three-game sweep.
