= Albany Polecats =

- 1992–1995; Albany, GA

Minor league affiliations
- Class: Class A (1992–1995)
- League: South Atlantic League (1992–1995)
- Division: Southern Division

Major league affiliations
- Team: Montreal Expos (1995, 1992); Baltimore Orioles (1993–1994)

Minor league titles
- League titles: None
- Division titles: None

Team data
- Name: Albany Polecats (1992–1995)
- Colors: Black, silver, white
- Ballpark: Polecat Park (1992–1995)

The Albany Polecats were a minor league baseball team in Albany, Georgia. They were a Class A team that played in the South Atlantic League and were a farm team affiliated with both the Montreal Expos and the Baltimore Orioles during the franchise's tenure in Albany. They played all of their home games at the Paul Eames Sports Complex. While at Paul Eames Sports Complex during their tenure, the stadium was dubbed "Polecat Park," even though the venue was officially named after Paul Eames, a minor-league baseball legend. During the team's four years in the South Atlantic League, the Polecats never finished higher than eighth overall in the fourteen-team league. Subpar performance coupled with poor attendance proved too much to bear for the struggling franchise. Prior the 1996 season, the Albany Polecats were sold and moved north to Salisbury, Maryland, where the franchise became the current-day Delmarva Shorebirds.

== List of Albany Polecats players in the MLB ==
All players are listed in alphabetical order by their surname, with the year(s) they played for Albany in parentheses.

- Shane Andrews (1992)
- Armando Benítez (1993)
- Yamil Benitez (1992)
- Hiram Bocachica (1995)
- Jolbert Cabrera (1992)
- Howie Clark (1993–1994)
- Trace Coquillette (1995)
- Tommy Davis (1994)
- Joey Dawley (1994)
- Rick DeHart (1992)
- Jayson Durocher (1995)
- Sid Fernandez (1994)
- Cliff Floyd (1992)
- Brad Fullmer (1995)
- Vladimir Guerrero (1995)
- Bob Henley (1995)
- David Lamb (1994)
- Brian Looney (1992)
- Troy Mattes (1995)
- Miguel Mejia (1993–1994)
- David Moraga (1995)
- Tommy Phelps (1995)
- Simon Pond (1995)
- Jay Powell (1993)
- Jeremy Powell (1995)
- Al Reyes (1992)
- Brian Sackinsky (1993)
- Fernando Seguignol (1995)
- Garrett Stephenson (1993)
- Mike Thurman (1995)
- Ugueth Urbina (1992)
- Javier Vázquez (1995)
- B.J. Waszgis (1993)

== Year-by-year record ==
Year	Parent club	League	Division	W–L	Win %	Place	Manager	Postseason	Attendance	Source
Albany Polecats
1992	Montreal Expos	SAL	Southern	72-70	.507	3rd	Lorenzo Bundy	-	97,810	
1993	Baltimore Orioles	SAL	Southern	71-71	.500	4th	Mike O'Berry	-	140,140	
1994	Baltimore Orioles	SAL	South	63-74	.460	4th	Butch Wynegar	-	124,520	
1995	Montreal Expos	SAL	South	62-78	.443	5th	Doug Sisson	-	91,289	
Totals				268-293	.478				453,759	
