= Robert C. Wynn Baseball Field =

Baseball stadium in Bradenton, Florida

- Interactive map of Robert C. Wynn Baseball Field
- Former names: Manatee Junior College Field (1959-1976)
- Location: 34 Street West at 57 Avenue; Bradenton, Florida
- Coordinates: 27.439069°N 82.594421°W
- Owner: State College of Florida, Manatee–Sarasota
- Operator: The Manatees
- Capacity: 500
- Field size: Left Field -330; Center Field - 405; Right Field - 330

Construction
- Opened: 1959
- Cost: $ million

Tenants
- State College of Florida Manatees (NJCAA) (1959-present); Bradenton Juice (SCL) (2007)

Website
- https://www.scfmanatees.com/landing/index

The Robert C. Wynn Baseball Field is a collegiate and former minor league baseball stadium, located in Bradenton, Florida. The field is currently the home of the Manatees baseball team from the State College of Florida, Manatee–Sarasota, formerly Manatee Community College and Manatee Junior College.

The stadium opened in 1959 as Manatee Junior College Field. In 1977 it was renamed after Robert C. Wynn, the State College of Florida coach who started the baseball program at the college in 1959. In 2012 the field received national recognition as the only college or university this year to be awarded the prestigious American Baseball Coaches Association (ABCA) TURFACE Field Maintenance Award.

In 2007 the stadium was also briefly the home of the Bradenton Juice, of the South Coast League. However the field could not a provide the proper environment for minor league baseball. Two examples cited by league officials were the team's inability to sell beer and have post-game fireworks, due to the stadium being located on the college's campus. As a result, the attendance for the Juice games was dismal with only 148 fans attending a May 25, 2007 game at the stadium against the Macon Music. The Juice folded after the 2007 season and the league became dormant in 2008.

The baseball facilities were renovated during the 2010–2011 school year. The improvements included a new entrance, parking lot, batter's eye, windscreens, palm trees and foliage, as well as a net backstop with a brick knee wall.

== See also ==
- State College of Florida, Manatee-Sarasota
