= Wally Backman =

American baseball player and manager (born 1959)

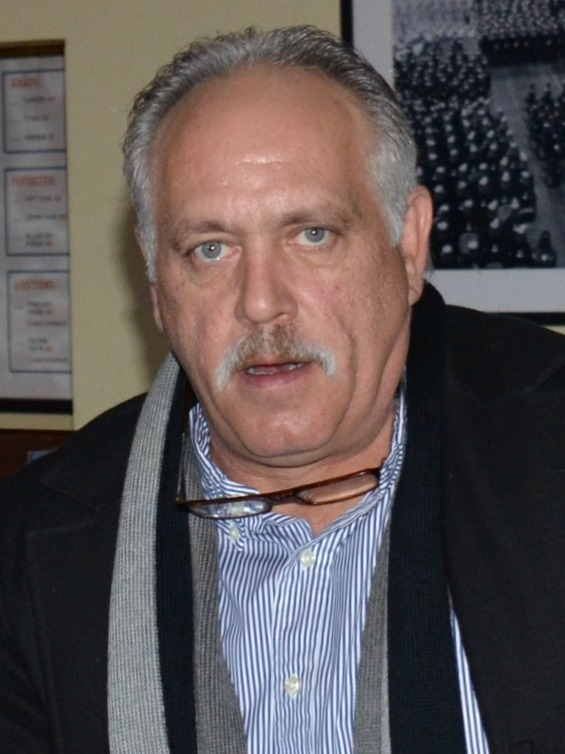
- Backman in 2015
- Second baseman / Manager
- Born: September 22, 1959 (age 67); Hillsboro, Oregon, U.S.
- Batted: Switch Threw: Right

MLB debut
- September 2, 1980, for the New York Mets

Last MLB appearance
- May 14, 1993, for the Seattle Mariners

MLB statistics
- Batting average: .275
- Home runs: 10
- Runs batted in: 240
- Stats at Baseball Reference

Teams
- New York Mets (1980–1988); Minnesota Twins (1989); Pittsburgh Pirates (1990); Philadelphia Phillies (1991–1992); Seattle Mariners (1993)

Career highlights and awards
- World Series champion (1986)

Walter Wayne Backman (born September 22, 1959) is an American former Major League Baseball second baseman. He is best known for his time with the New York Mets from 1980–1988 and was a member of their 1986 World Series-winning team. He was also the former manager for the Las Vegas 51s, the Mets' Triple-A team, from 2013 to 2016. He served as the bench coach for the Pericos de Puebla of the Mexican Baseball League in 2017. Backman was the manager of the Long Island Ducks of the Atlantic League of Professional Baseball, until October 2, 2023, when it was announced that the Ducks and Backman had parted ways.

== Playing career ==
=== New York Mets ===
==== Early years (1980–1985) ====
Backman was the Mets' first round pick in the 1977 Major League Baseball draft (sixteenth overall). He was assigned to the New York–Penn League's Little Falls Mets upon signing, and batted .325 with six home runs in his first professional season. After batting .293 for the Triple-A Tidewater Tides in 1980, Backman received a September call up to the Mets. Making his major league debut starting at second base against the Los Angeles Dodgers at Dodger Stadium on September 2, Backman got a single in his first at-bat, driving in Claudell Washington for his first major league run batted in.

After battling for three seasons to earn a starting job, Backman emerged as the Mets' starting second baseman in 1984. He batted .280, and finished second on the club to Mookie Wilson (46) with 32 stolen bases.

==== 1986 ====
Prior to the start of the 1986 season, general manager Frank Cashen brought in Tim Teufel, a right-handed hitting infielder from the Minnesota Twins for Billy Beane, Joe Klink and Bill Latham. He and Backman formed a platoon at second base, and along with Wilson and Lenny Dykstra, provided a "spark" at the top of the Mets' line up, and set the table for the heavy hitters who batted behind them.

Backman scored 67 runs, stole 13 bases and batted over .300 (.320) for the first time in his career for the team that won 108 games and took the National League East by 21.5 games. He batted .333 in the World Series against the Boston Red Sox and led off for the Mets in the famous tenth inning of Game 6 with a fly out to Jim Rice. The Mets defeated the Red Sox four games to three in the World Series.

==== 1987 ====
For the 1987 season, Backman batted .250 with 11 stolen bases in 90 games. The Mets finished the season with a 92-70 record, but failed to make the playoffs.

==== 1988 ====
Backman and Teufel were still platooning at second base in 1988 when the Mets won their division for the second time during Backman's tenure with the team. Backman batted .303 for the division winners, and the Mets won 100 games that season, taking the NL East by fifteen games over the Pittsburgh Pirates. However, the heavily favored Mets lost to the Los Angeles Dodgers in the 1988 National League Championship Series. Backman played respectably in the division series (.273 avg., 2 runs, 2 RBIs).

Following the season, the Mets sent him and Mike Santiago to the Minnesota Twins for Jeff Bumgarner, Steve Gasser and Toby Nivens.

=== Pittsburgh Pirates ===
Backman under-performed with the Twins, batting only .231 with one home run and 33 runs scored while driving in only 26 in 1989. After only one season in Minnesota, Backman signed as a free agent with the Mets' division rivals, the Pittsburgh Pirates. With slick fielder José Lind already at second base for the Pirates, Backman received most of his playing time backing up Jeff King at third.

The Pirates opened the 1990 season against the Mets at Shea Stadium. In front of his former home crowd, Backman went two for five with a single and triple and scored two runs in the Pirates' 12–3 victory over the Mets. Against the San Diego Padres on April 27, Backman accomplished the rare feat of six hits in a nine inning game. For the season, Backman batted .292 and scored 62 runs for a Pirates team that went 95–67, and took the division by four games over the Mets.

=== Later career ===
Backman spent 1991 and 1992 with the Philadelphia Phillies. He signed with the 1992 National League champion Atlanta Braves, for 1993, but failed to make the team out of spring training. He joined the Seattle Mariners, but was released 38 games into the season with a .138 batting average with only two runs scored in 31 plate appearances.

=== Career summary ===
Over the course of a major league career that spanned from 1980 to 1993, Backman batted .275 in 1102 games with 10 home runs and 275 stolen bases. Backman had a career .980 fielding percentage at second base.

== Coaching career ==
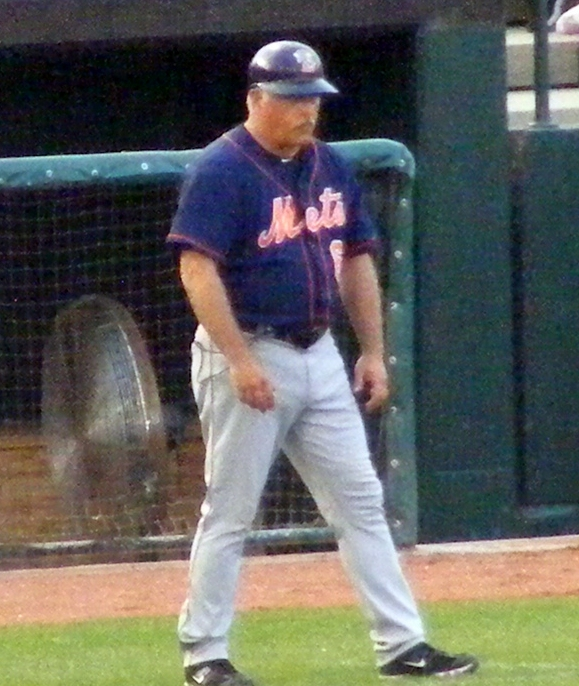
Wally Backman as manager of the Binghamton Mets

After retiring as a player, Backman was inducted into the Oregon Sports Hall of Fame in 2002. In 1998, Backman managed the Bend Bandits of Bend, Oregon during their final season of operations in the Western Baseball League. They finished second in the North Division at 43–46. Backman led the 2002 Birmingham Barons (a Chicago White Sox double-A Southern League affiliate) to a 79–61 record. In 2004, he led the Lancaster JetHawks, the Arizona Diamondbacks' High-A team, to an 86–54 record and was named Sporting News "Minor League Manager of the Year".

On November 1, 2004, Backman was promoted to manager of the Arizona Diamondbacks' major league squad. However, in its story about Backman's hire, The New York Times reported that Backman had serious legal and financial problems. He had been arrested in 1999 for DUI in Kennewick, Washington as documented on HBO Real Sports with Bryant Gumbel. A year later, he was arrested in connection with an altercation in his home in Prineville, Oregon. In addition, Backman had declared Chapter 7 bankruptcy. The Diamondbacks initially stood by him, but fired him on November 5, just four days after his hiring. Managing partner Ken Kendrick admitted that the Diamondbacks had not fully vetted Backman before hiring him. He added that Backman had misled team officials about his past.

Backman began his managerial comeback with the South Georgia Peanuts of the independent South Coast League. His return to managing was documented by the TV series Playing for Peanuts. The Peanuts won their league with a 59–28 record and went on to win the league championship that season.

In December 2007, Backman became manager of the Joliet JackHammers. With the team in sixth place in the Northern League with a 24–42 record, he was fired on July 30, 2009. In October 2009, Backman's name circulated as a likely candidate for the Mets' double A managerial job with the Binghamton Mets; however, the Mets decided instead to promote Tim Teufel from the St. Lucie Mets, and Backman was given the St. Lucie job. Two weeks later, the Mets changed their minds, and Backman was handed the reins to the Brooklyn Cyclones instead. Backman went on to lead the Cyclones to a league-best 51–24 record, winning the McNamara Division of the New York–Penn League by 12 games. The Cyclones were ultimately swept by the Tri-City ValleyCats in the league championship series.

Backman was a candidate to replace Jerry Manuel as the New York Mets' major league manager in 2011. However, the position went to Terry Collins. Backman was subsequently named manager of the Mets' double-A affiliate, the Binghamton Mets. In Backman's first season in Binghamton, the club had a 65–76 record. Backman remained highly regarded in the Mets organization and was promoted to manage their Triple-A affiliate, the Buffalo Bisons for the 2012 season.

In 2013, Backman managed the Mets' new Triple-A affiliate, the Las Vegas 51s, leading the team to an 81–63 record and winning the Pacific Coast League's Pacific South Division title. Las Vegas lost to Salt Lake in the conference championship series. Backman returned to the 51s for the 2014 season, and the team once again advanced to the playoffs. On August 29, 2014, Backman was named the PCL Manager of the Year. Backman resigned from the Las Vegas 51s on September 12, 2016. However, in later interviews, Backman claimed that he was forced out as manager. After spending the winter getting turned down by many other clubs, Backman became convinced that Mets GM Sandy Alderson had "blackballed" him, and said a friend had tipped him off that Alderson was working against him. Alderson declined to respond to Backman's allegation; however, a member of the Mets organization denied that Alderson had sabotaged Backman's job opportunities.

In 2017, Backman signed on as manager of the Acereros de Monclova of the Mexican League. On May 19, 2017, 42 games into the season, Backman was fired. Shortly thereafter, Backman was hired as the bench coach for the Pericos de Puebla.

Backman was named manager of the New Britain Bees of the Atlantic League of Professional Baseball for the 2018 season on November 17, 2017. On November 28, 2018, Backman was announced as the new manager of the Atlantic League's Long Island Ducks for the 2019 season. He mutually agreed with the Ducks to part ways at the completion of the 2023 season.

Backman has been described as a players' manager. He is noted for his "old school" style, as well as for his frequent use of practical jokes when delivering news of a promotion to the major leagues.

Backman now takes over as the manager of the Staten Island Ferryhawks

== See also ==
- List of Major League Baseball single-game hits leaders
