= South Georgia Waves =

- 2002; Albany, Georgia

Minor league affiliations
- Class: Class A
- League: South Atlantic League
- Division: Southern Division

Major league affiliations
- Team: Los Angeles Dodgers (2002)

Minor league titles
- League titles: None
- First-half titles: 2002

Team data
- Name: South Georgia Waves (2002)
- Colors: Blue, black, silver, white
- Mascot: Crash
- Ballpark: Paul Eames Sports Complex (2002)

The South Georgia Waves were a Low-A class minor league baseball team in Albany, Georgia for one season before relocating to Columbus, Georgia, where they operated under the same name for the 2003 season before being rebranded the Columbus Catfish. The Waves were members of the South Atlantic League and a farm team of the Los Angeles Dodgers.

== Franchise history ==
South Georgia's mascot was a blue creature named "Crash", who was brought over when the franchise moved from Wilmington. According to Crash’s baseball card for the 2001 Wilmington Waves, Crash was born on November 11, 2000, in Wilmington, North Carolina. Crash made his first appearance at the Westfield Shoppingtown Independence Mall with Santa Claus. Also, Crash’s favorite things were baseball, the beach, dancing, playing with water guns, and his park buddy, the Wilmington Waves’ head groundskeeper.

Nine days before the 2003 season was to begin the Waves moved from Albany to Columbus. This was due in part because of disputes between the team owner David Heller and the city of Albany in regard to a baseball stadium deal.

Originally, the team was going to be bought by both Cal Ripken Jr. and Don Mattingly, where the two would move the franchise north to Evansville, Indiana, prior to the 2004 season. However, the deal fell through and Heller retained ownership and renamed the team the Columbus Catfish.

== List of South Georgia Waves players in the MLB ==
All players are listed in alphabetical order by surname.

- Edwin Bellorín
- Jonathan Broxton
- Francisco Cruceta
- Joselo Díaz
- Jumbo Díaz
- Víctor Díaz
- A.J. Ellis
- Franklin Gutiérrez
- Eric Hull
- Edwin Jackson
- Russell Martin
- Franquelis Osoria

== Year-by-year record ==
| Year | Record | Finish | Manager | Playoffs |
|---|---|---|---|---|
| 2002 | 75-63 | 5th | Scott Little | |
