= Jason Repko =

American baseball player (born 1980)

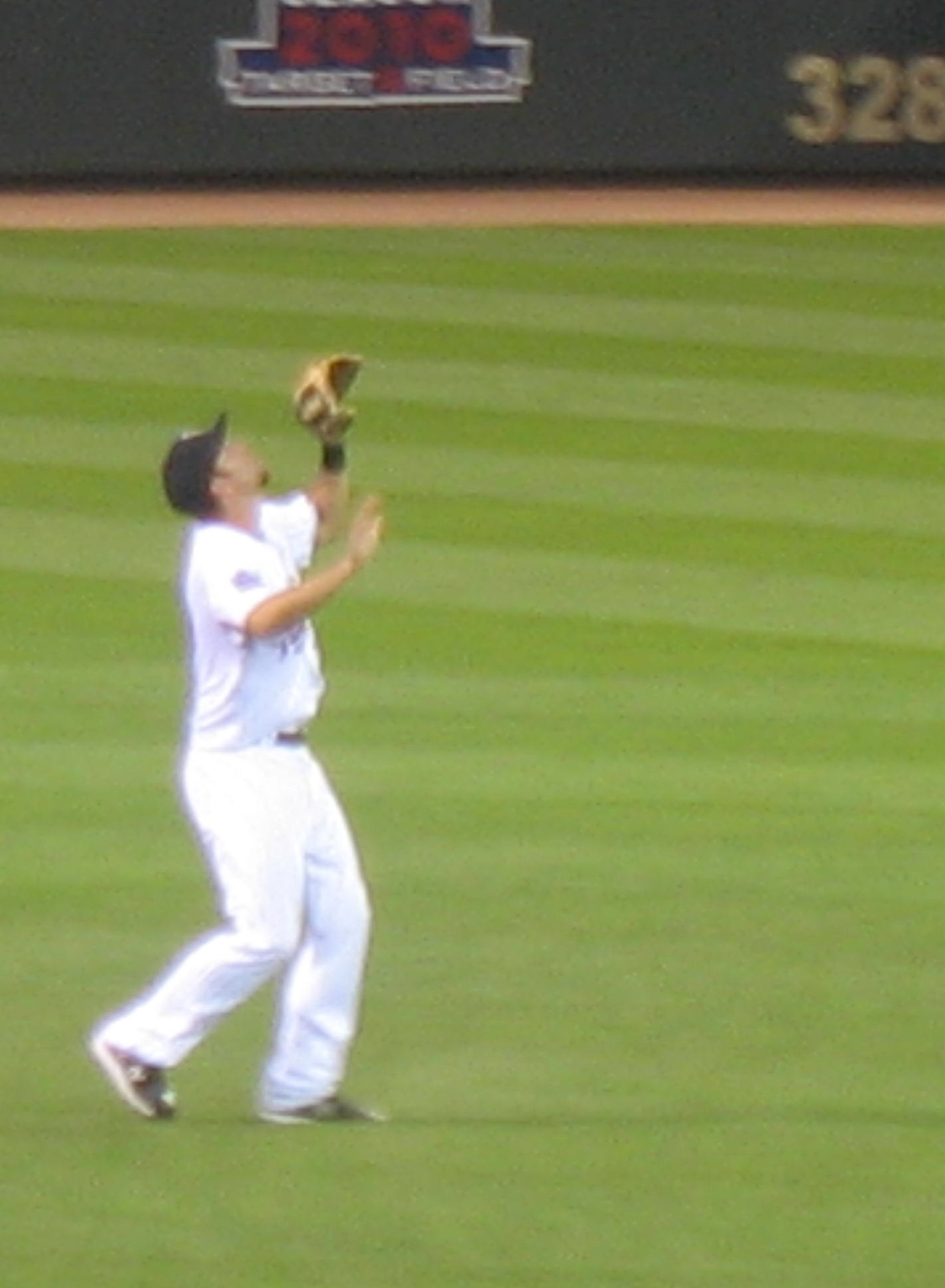
- Repko with the Minnesota Twins in 2010
- Outfielder
- Born: December 27, 1980 (age 45); East Chicago, Indiana, U.S.
- Batted: Right Threw: Right

MLB debut
- April 6, 2005, for the Los Angeles Dodgers

Last MLB appearance
- April 20, 2012, for the Boston Red Sox

MLB statistics
- Batting average: .224
- Home runs: 16
- Runs batted in: 67
- Stats at Baseball Reference

Teams
- Los Angeles Dodgers (2005–2006, 2008–2009); Minnesota Twins (2010–2011); Boston Red Sox (2012)

Jason Edward Repko (born December 27, 1980) is an American former professional baseball outfielder. He played in Major League Baseball (MLB) for the Los Angeles Dodgers, Minnesota Twins and Boston Red Sox.

== Early life ==
Repko attended Hanford High School in Richland, Washington, and was a letterman in baseball. As a senior, he posted a .581 batting average with 18 home runs and 14 stolen bases. He also clocked a 94 MPH fastball from the mound. A High School All-American infielder, he was drafted by the Los Angeles Dodgers in the 1st round of the 1999 Major League Baseball draft, Repko skipped his high school graduation ceremony and passed on a scholarship with San Diego State University to sign with the Dodgers.

== Career ==
=== Los Angeles Dodgers ===
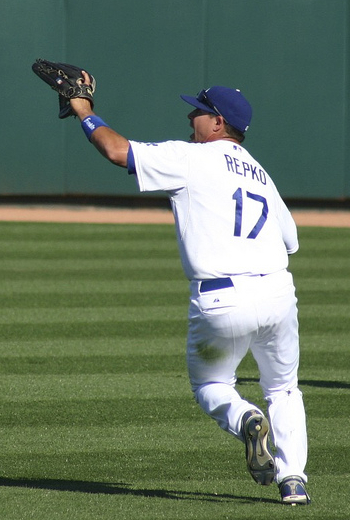
Repko with the Los Angeles Dodgers during spring training in 2010

He started his professional career as a shortstop with the rookie league Great Falls Dodgers, hitting .304 with 8 homers and 12 steals and being selected to the Pioneer League All-Star Team.

His career was slowed when he suffered a torn ACL during extended spring training in 2000 and missed most of the season. He then suffered a broken vertebra on the right side of his back, and only managed to play in 88 games for Single-A Wilmington in 2001.

Healthy for the 2002 season, the Dodgers had him switch positions from shortstop, where he had played previously, to center field while playing for the Vero Beach Dodgers. Repko hit .272 for Vero Beach, with 9 homers and 29 steals that season and was selected to the Florida State League All-Star team.

He played for the Double-A Jacksonville Suns in 2003 and split 2004 between Jacksonville and the Triple-A Las Vegas 51s.

He made his MLB debut on April 6, 2005, against the San Francisco Giants. He singled off Jason Christiansen in the sixth inning for his first major league hit. His first major league home run came on April 10 in Arizona off Óscar Villarreal and homered in his first at bat at Dodger Stadium on April 12 against the Giants. He hit .221 with 8 home runs and 30 RBIs for the Dodgers in 2005, playing in 129 games.

In 2006, he was off to a fast start, but suffered a high ankle sprain and missed 2 1/2 months, returning to the Dodgers on July 24. Repko never received much playing time after returning, buried behind the outfield rotation of J. D. Drew, Kenny Lofton, Andre Ethier, Marlon Anderson, and Matt Kemp.

Repko underwent a surgical procedure on October 20 that kept him sidelined for the first half of spring training in 2007 and then when he was finally cleared to play, he immediately suffered another injury in a spring training game on March 22, 2008, at vero beach tearing his hamstring on a warning track mishap. Earlier in the game he collided with Rafael Furcal, sidelining Furcal and causing a severe ankle injury that hampered Furcal all season.

Repko played his first game of 2008 on June 30 against the Houston Astros, going 0 for 4 with 4 strikeouts. He appeared in 22 games at the end of the season with the Dodgers after spending the majority of the season in AAA with Las Vegas.

In 2009, he played with the AAA Albuquerque Isotopes and then appeared in 10 games with the Dodgers in September, primarily as a pinch runner or late inning defensive replacement.

On March 31, 2010, Repko was released by the Dodgers and became a free agent.

=== Minnesota Twins ===
On April 6, 2010, Repko signed a minor league deal with the Minnesota Twins. He was called up to the Twins on June 24.

=== Boston Red Sox ===
He signed with the Boston Red Sox on a minor league contract with an invitation to spring training in 2012. Repko started the season in Triple A Pawtucket before being called up April 15 due to the injuries of Carl Crawford and Jacoby Ellsbury.

=== Independent Leagues ===
Repko signed with the York Revolution of the Atlantic League of Professional Baseball for the 2013 season and played with them in 2014 also. In 2015, he signed with the Sioux Falls Canaries of the American Association of Independent Professional Baseball.

Repko signed with the Bridgeport Bluefish of the Atlantic League for the 2016 season. He was traded to the York Revolution. He retired while a member of the Revolution in 2016.
