= USC Aiken Pacers =

USCA Pacers
- University: University of South Carolina Aiken
- Nickname: Pacers
- NCAA: Division II
- Conference: Peach Belt
- Athletic director: Todd Wilkinson
- Location: Aiken, South Carolina
- First season: 1961
- Varsity teams: 11 (5 men's, 5 women's, 1 co-ed)
- Basketball arena: Convocation Center
- Baseball stadium: Roberto Hernandez Stadium
- Softball stadium: USCA Softball Facility
- Soccer stadium: Pacer Pit
- Colors: USCA Midnight and USCA Fire Red
- Mascot: Ace the Pacer
- Website: pacersports.com

Team NCAA championships
- 3

Individual and relay NCAA champions
- 2

The USCA Pacers (formerly USC Aiken) are the athletic teams that represent the University of South Carolina Aiken, located in Aiken, South Carolina, in intercollegiate sports at the Division II level of the National Collegiate Athletic Association (NCAA). The Pacers have primarily competed in the Peach Belt Conference since the 1990–91 academic year. The Pacers' primary rival is conference foe Augusta.

USCA competes in ten intercollegiate varsity sports. Men's sports include baseball, basketball, cross country, golf, and soccer; while women's sports include basketball, cross country, soccer, softball, and volleyball. Men's and women's tennis were discontinued at the end of the 2018–19 school year. The Pacers also sponsor a co-ed Spirit Squad.

== History ==
USCA's athletic programs were initially known as the Rebels. The mascot name was changed to Pacers in 1971.

== Conference affiliations ==
NCAA

- Peach Belt Conference (1990–present)

== Varsity teams ==
Men's sports	Women's sports
Baseball	Basketball
Basketball	Cross country
Cross country	Soccer
Golf	Softball
Soccer	Volleyball

=== Baseball ===
Ahead of the 2026 season, former Barton College head baseball coach joins the Pacers, succeeding Michael Holder. Holder followed his former boss, Kenny Thomas, who led the Pacers to nine NCAA Southeast Regional appearances across 22 seasons as head coach.

Longtime Coastal Carolina head coach Gary Gilmore served as an assistant from 1986–1989 and subsequently as head coach at USCA from 1990–1995.

It was at the end of Gilmore's first season on staff in 1986 that pitcher Roberto Hernández was drafted in the first round of the MLB draft. Hernández later made substantial donations to his alma mater, which led to a new baseball stadium being constructed and named in his honor on the university's campus.

=== Men's basketball ===
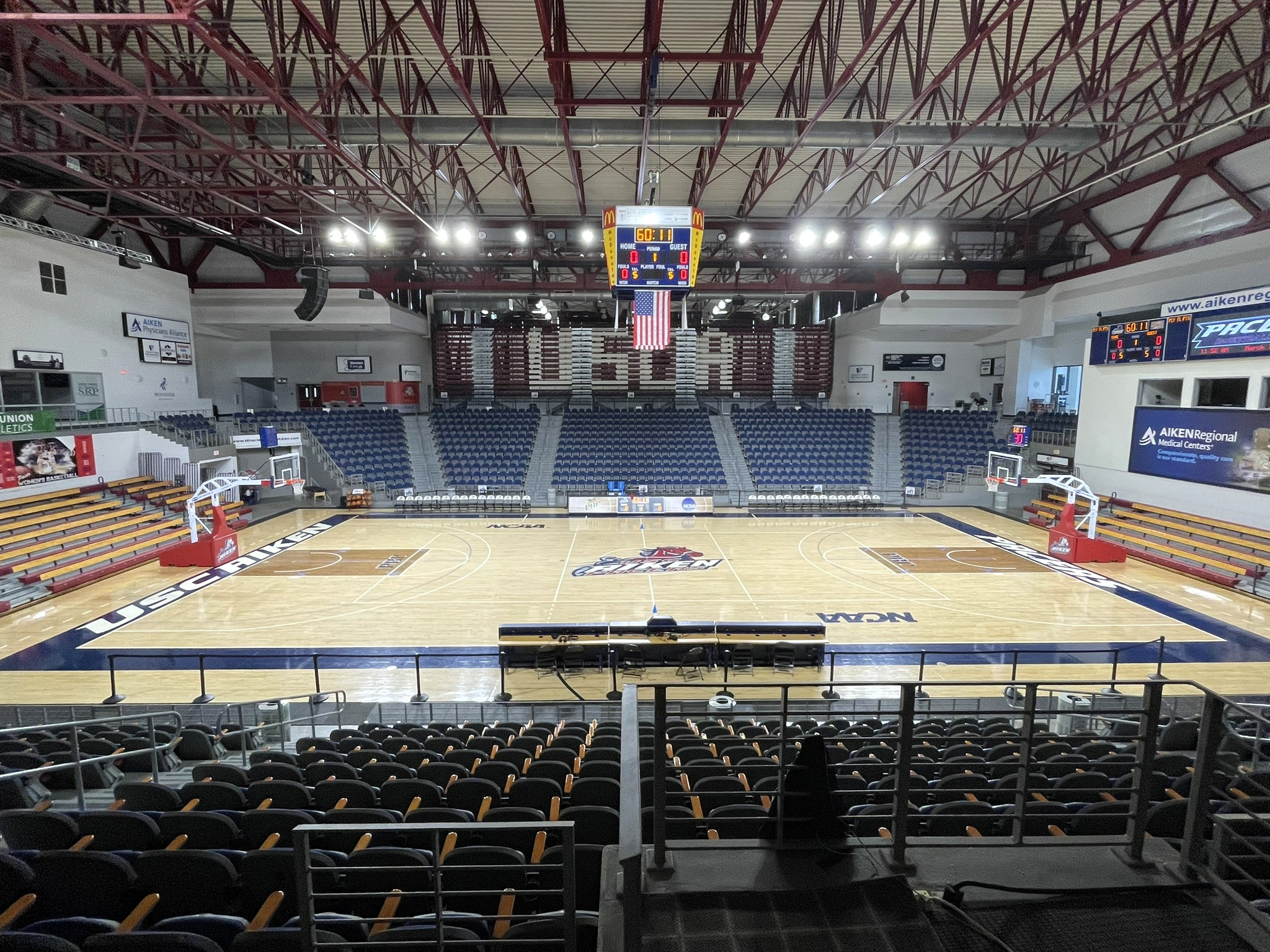
The USCA Convocation Center

The men's basketball program has been led by Mark Vanderslice since the 2015–16 season.

=== Women's basketball ===
The women's basketball program was led by head coach Mark Miller from the 2016–17 season through the conclusion of the 2024–25 season.

In April 2025, Gannon assistant coach Brittany Batts was named the Pacers' new head coach. At Gannon, Batts was named the 2024 Women’s Basketball Coaches Association Assistant of the Year

=== Cross country ===
The Pacers' cross country program was led by head coach Marshall Leonard through 2024. Longtime Lynchburg coach Jim Sprecher is set to lead the program beginning in fall 2025.

=== Golf ===
The Pacers' golf program has been led by coach Michael Carlisle since the 1991–92 season. During his tenure, the program has experienced unprecedented success, including a run of three consecutive national championships (2004, 2005, and 2006).

=== Men's soccer ===
The men's soccer program is led by head coach Nick Sakiewicz. He takes over for longtime coach Ike Ofoje, who was also the Pacers' inaugural women's soccer head coach.

=== Women's soccer ===
The women's soccer program is led by head coach Adam Kleman. Kleman succeeds Tina Murphy, who in her two year tenure before departing for Gardner-Webb led the Pacers to their first Peach Belt tournament appearance since the 2017–18 season.

=== Softball ===
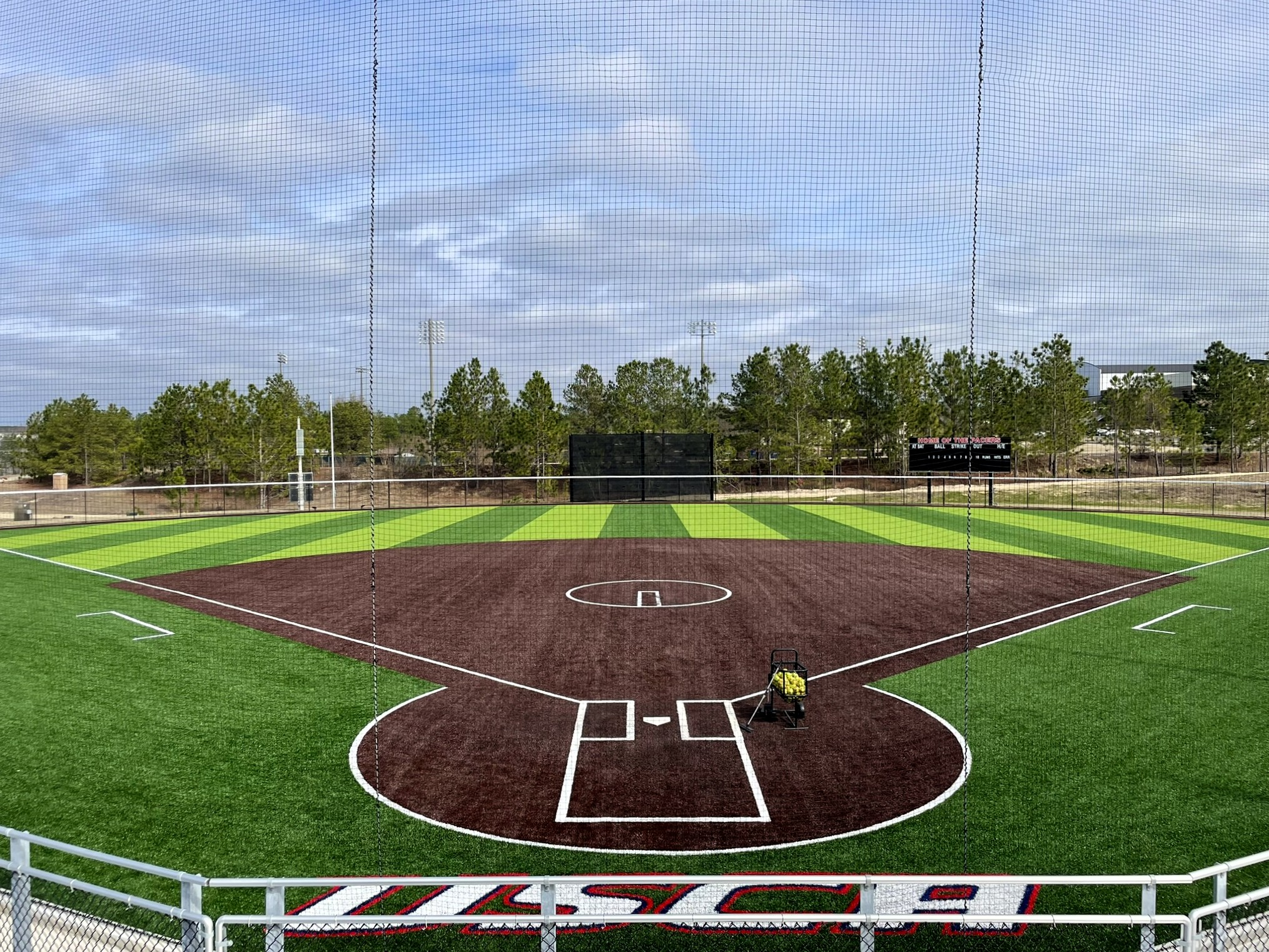
The new USCA Softball Facility (opened 2025)

The Pacers' softball program is led by head coach Jaclin Poole. Under Poole's leadership, the Pacers made the 2022 Peach Belt Conference tournament, the program's first since 2016.

=== Volleyball ===
The Pacers' volleyball program is led by head coach Glenn Cox, who has guided the program since 2008.

== Conference championships ==
As members of the Peach Belt Conference the Pacers have won 55 conference championships (46 team, nine individual) across five programs.

=== Men's Sports ===
Baseball

- PBC Regular Season - 3 (1994, 2009, 2013)
- PBC Tournament - 2 (1992, 1993)

Basketball

- PBC Regular Season - 7 (1992-93, 2007-08, 2011-12, 2012-13, 2013-14, 2022-23, 2023-24)
- PBC Tournament - 5 (1993, 2010, 2013, 2014, 2025)

Golf

- PBC Championships - 12 (1995, 1996, 1997, 2002, 2003, 2005, 2006, 2008, 2013, 2014, 2017, 2018)
- PBC Individual Champions - 9 (Brian Kassel '93, Jamie Stanley '95, '97, Brooks Blackburn '96, Scott Brown '02, '06, Dane Burkhart '05, Brandon Robinson-Thompson '14, Johnson Holliday '18)

=== Women's Sports ===
Basketball

- PBC Regular Season - 3 (1990-91, 2001-02, 2007-08)
- PBC Tournament - 1 (2012)

Volleyball

- PBC Regular Season - 10 (1991, 1992, 1993, 1995, 2006, 2007, 2015, 2016, 2018, 2019)
- PBC Tournament - 5 (1991, 1992, 1996, 2006, 2007)

== Regional championships ==
The Pacers have had consistent success in regional competition, claiming 15 (10 team, five individual) NCAA Division II Region Titles across five sports.

=== Team ===
Association	Division	Sport	Year	Opponent/Runner-Up	Score
NCAA	Division II	Baseball	1993	Francis Marion	13–2
NCAA	Division II	Men's Golf	2002	–	835–
NCAA	Division II	Men's Golf	2003	Francis Marion	865–878
NCAA	Division II	Men's Golf	2004	Kennesaw State	578–586
NCAA	Division II	Men's Golf	2005	Armstrong State	887–891
NCAA	Division II	Men's Golf	2006	Columbus State	875–912
NCAA	Division II	Men's Basketball	2013	Barton	82–75
NCAA	Division II	Men's Basketball	2014	Montevallo	84–73
NCAA	Division II	Men's Tennis	2019	Wingate	4–2
NCAA	Division II	Volleyball	2016	Queens	3–2

=== Individual ===
Association	Division	Sport	Year	Individual(s)	Event	Score
NCAA	Division II	Men's Golf	1997	Jamie Stanley	Individual Title	220 (+4)
NCAA	Division II	Men's Golf	2003	Scott Usher	Individual Title	212 (–4)
NCAA	Division II	Men's Golf	2005	Scott Brown	Individual Title	216 (0)
NCAA	Division II	Men's Golf	2006	Scott Brown	Individual Title	211 (–5)
NCAA	Division II	Men's Golf	2012	Matt Atkins	Individual Title	210 (–6)

== National championships ==
=== Team ===
Association	Division	Sport	Year	Opponent/Runner-Up	Score
NCAA	Division II	Men's Golf	2004	Chico State	1,191–1,200
NCAA	Division II	Men's Golf	2005	Armstrong State	1,158–1,163
NCAA	Division II	Men's Golf	2006	Columbus State	1,148–1,160

=== Individual ===
Association	Division	Sport	Year	Individual(s)	Event	Score
NCAA	Division II	Men's Golf	2005	Dane Burkhart	Individual Title	279 (–5)
NCAA	Division II	Men's Golf	2008	Jeff Goff	Individual Title	278 (–2)

== Notable alumni ==
=== Baseball ===
- Rich Batchelor, (1986–89)
- Scott Cassidy, (1994–95)
- Paul Fletcher, (1986–87)
- Roberto Hernández, (1986)
- Adam Riggs, (1993–94)
- Bryan Ward, (1993)
- Reggie Williams, (1987–88)
- Mitch Spence, (2017-19)

=== Men's basketball ===
- Chris Commons, (2007–09)
- Josh Dollard, (2008–09)

=== Men's golf ===
- Matt Atkins, (2010–13)
- Scott Brown, (2001–05)
- Roberto Díaz, (2005–08)

=== Men's soccer ===
- Ranaldo Bailey, (2018–19)
- John Lesko, (2006–08)

=== Women's soccer ===
- Akeyla Furbert, (2012–15)
