= Anderson Rangers =

Minor league baseball team from 1970 to 1975

- 1970–1975; Anderson, South Carolina

Minor league affiliations
- Class: Class A
- League: Western Carolinas League

Major league affiliations
- Team: Texas Rangers (1975); New York Mets (1974); Detroit Tigers (1973); San Francisco Giants (1972); Washington Senators (1970-1971)

Minor league titles
- League titles (0): None

Team data
- Name: Anderson Rangers (1975); Anderson Mets (1974); Anderson Tigers (1973); Anderson Giants (1972); Anderson Senators (1970-1971)
- Ballpark: Anderson Memorial Stadium

The Anderson Rangers was the final name of a minor league baseball team, located in Anderson, South Carolina, in the early 1970s. The club was a member of the Class A Western Carolinas League and played its home games at the 4000-seat Anderson Memorial Stadium.

The team began in 1970 as the Anderson Senators and were affiliated with the Washington Senators through the 1971 season. These were the only consecutive years where the team retained a consistent affiliation, and their name changed each subsequent year to match their parent squad.

In 1972, the team became the Anderson Giants after becoming an affiliate of the San Francisco Giants. In 1973, they changed to the Anderson Tigers, affiliated with the Detroit Tigers. In 1974, they became the Anderson Mets as an affiliate of the New York Mets, and they played their final season in 1975 as an affiliate of the Texas Rangers, taking the name Anderson Rangers.

== Year-by-year record ==
Year	Record	Finish	Manager	Playoffs
1970	61-69	5th	Frank Gable	none
1971	55-66	4th	Frank Gable / Bill Haywood	none
1972	51-81	6th	Max Lanier	
1973	54-73	5th	Len Okrie	
1974	61-72	5th	Owen Friend	none
1975	67-70	2nd	Rich Donnelly	none

== Notable Anderson alumni ==
- Jim Clancy (1975) MLB All-Star
- Max Lanier (1972, MGR) 2 x MLB All-Star
- Lee Mazzilli (1974) MLB All-Star
- Rick Waits (1970)
