= Aiken Foxhounds =

- 2007; Aiken, South Carolina

Minor league affiliations
- Class: Independent
- League: South Coast League

Minor league titles
- League titles: None

Team data
- Name: Aiken Foxhounds
- Colors: Black, red, white, brown, tan, peach, gray
- Ballpark: Roberto Hernandez Stadium
- General manager: Bradley Bell
- Manager: Chris Bando

The Aiken Foxhounds were an independent league baseball team that existed in 2007. The team was based in Aiken, South Carolina and played its home games at Roberto Hernandez Stadium. The club was managed by former Cleveland Indians catcher Chris Bando. A member of the South Coast League, the Foxhounds finished their lone season in 4th place of the standings.

The Foxhounds name was chosen from over 1,000 entries in a "Name the Team" online contest. The name came from the breed of dog which is a popular in the Carolinas. Around 1890, fox hunting clubs were founded in the region. Foxhounds general manager Bradley Bell also stated that "Furthermore, 'Foxhounds' is a unique name that has not been used in minor league sports. (It is) a name that affords us some creativity and flexibility in marketing the team throughout the region".

While the league and the team never played a second season, the Foxhounds were prepared to play again 2008 in the South Coast League. The league folded in late March 2008.

== 2007 season ==
Half	Record	Finish	GB	League Standing
1st	22-23	.489	11.5	4th
2nd	19-25	.432	9	5th
Total	41-48	.461	--	4th
