= Playing for Peanuts =

2008 documentary TV series

Playing for Peanuts logo

Playing for Peanuts is a 10-episode documentary television series about minor league baseball. The ten episode series follows the South Georgia Peanuts of the independent South Coast League during the 2007 season.

== History ==
The series centered on former New York Mets star Wally Backman's managerial comeback, following a four-day stint as manager of the Arizona Diamondbacks in 2004. Backman had been fired by Arizona after past legal troubles surfaced.

Playing for Peanuts premiered on nine regional sports networks on May 11, 2008. The show was received favorably by baseball fans and the sports media, but it was removed from TV by the producer, John J. Fitzgerald after a dispute with SportsNet New York due to the network's refusal to promote the show. Fitzgerald maintained that the network refused to promote the show because it might be seen as an endorsement of Backman to replace New York Mets manager Willie Randolph. SportsNet New York is owned by Sterling Equities, who at the time was the Mets parent company. Fitzgerald has since posted select episodes on his YouTube account, and is selling the complete series on DVD via Amazon.

In November 2009, Backman was hired by the New York Mets to manage their Class A affiliate Brooklyn Cyclones. According to Baseball Digest, Backman had asked Fitzgerald for the cell phone number of Mets COO Jeff Wilpon. After calling Wilpon, Backman reportedly impressed the team during a series of interviews, leading to his hiring.
