= Anderson Braves =

- 1980–1984; Anderson, South Carolina

Minor league affiliations
- Class: Class A (1980–1984)
- League: South Atlantic League (1980–1984)

Major league affiliations
- Team: Atlanta Braves (1980–1984)

Minor league titles
- League titles: None

Team data
- Ballpark: Anderson Memorial Stadium (1980–1984)

The Anderson Braves were a minor league baseball team located in Anderson, South Carolina. The team played in the South Atlantic League, and were affiliated with and owned by the Atlanta Braves. Their home stadium was Anderson Memorial Stadium.

The Anderson Braves started playing in 1980, with a roster featuring future major leaguers Brett Butler, Brook Jacoby and Brad Komminsk. The Braves received a great deal of support from the community during the 1980 season. Local radio station WANS AM/FM was a major sponsor. "Hank Aaron Night" brought out many fans to the ballpark in August 1980.

The team experienced relatively high attendance figures that were facilitated by numerous promotions and inexpensive concessions. Despite local support for the team, Atlanta Braves owner Ted Turner moved the team to Sumter, South Carolina after the 1984 season. The team then became the Sumter Braves.

== The ballpark ==
The Braves played at Anderson Memorial Stadium. The stadium was built in 1970 and is still in use today, as home to the Anderson University Trojans. The ballpark seats 2,500 and is located at 1921 White Street Extension, Anderson, SC 29624.

== Notable alumni ==
- Brett Butler (1980) MLB All-Star
- Ron Gant (1984) 2 x MLB All-Star
- Sonny Jackson (1980-1981)
- Brook Jacoby (1980) 2 x MLB All-Star
- Brad Komminsk (1980)
- Mark Lemke (1984)
- Zane Smith (1982)
- Brian Snitker (1982) 2018 NL Manager of the Year

== Year-by-year record ==
Year	Record	Finish	Manager	Playoffs
1980	64-76	6th	Sonny Jackson	
1981	57-86	8th	Sonny Jackson	
1982	72-70	5th	Brian Snitker	
1983	64-79	7th	Rick Albert	
1984	61-82	9th	Rick Albert	
