= Robert Wynne (disambiguation) =

Robert Wynne (1851–1922) was an American official, diplomat and journalist.

Robert Wynne may also refer to:

- Robert Wynne (MP for Caernarvon) (1690–1762), MP for Caernarvon 1754–61
- Robert Wynne (Chancellor of St Asaph) (c. 1661–1743), Welsh priest and academic
- Robert Wynne (Archdeacon of Aghadoe) (1838–1912), Irish priest
- Robert Wynne (Virginia politician) (1622–1675), member of the Virginia House of Burgesses 1658 and 1660–74, Speaker 1662–74
- Robert Wynne (Irish politician) (1761–1838), MP for Sligo Borough 1789–99
- Robert Watkin Wynne (c. 1754–1806), Welsh politician, MP for Denbighshire 1789–96

== See also ==
- Robert Wynn (disambiguation)
- Robert Wynne-Edwards (1897–1974), British civil engineer and army officer
