= Bradenton Juice =

- 2007; Bradenton, Florida

Minor league affiliations
- Class: Independent
- League: South Coast League

Minor league titles
- League titles: None

Team data
- Name: Bradenton Juice
- Colors: Navy, orange, tangerine, white, green, gray
- Ballpark: Robert C. Wynn Baseball Field
- General manager: Andrew Aguilar
- Manager: James Frisbie

The Bradenton Juice were a short-lived minor league baseball team based in Bradenton, Florida in 2007. The team's name came from a "Name the Team" contest that included over 100 suggestions for the ball club. The club played in the South Coast League. The Juice's home game were held at Robert C. Wynn Baseball Field, which is located on the campus of Manatee Community College, now State College of Florida, Manatee–Sarasota. However the Juice were no longer permitted to use the field after just four home games into the season.

Juice games were broadcast on WSRQ 1220AM radio in Sarasota/Bradenton, FL.

During the Juice's lone season, pitcher Brian Gartley went 10-3 with 96 strikeouts to win the Most Outstanding Pitcher award. On March 31, 2008, the League office issued an announcement that it was suspending operations as of April 1, citing an inability to close on a large amount of debt. While the statement claimed that it planned to resume operations in 2009, however the league never returned. The Juice dissolved with the league, as a result.

== 2007 season ==
Half	Record	Finish	GB	League Standing
1st	24-20	.545	9	3rd
2nd	23-22	.511	5.5	4th
Total	47-42	.528	--	3rd
