= South Georgia Peanuts =

- 2007; Albany, Georgia

Minor league affiliations
- Class: Independent
- League: South Coast League

Minor league titles
- League titles: 2007
- First-half titles: 2007

Team data
- Colors: Royal blue, yellow, white, navy, tan, orange, peach
- Ballpark: Paul Eames Sports Complex
- General manager: Keith Michlig
- Manager: Wally Backman

The South Georgia Peanuts were a short-lived minor league baseball team, based in Albany, Georgia in 2007. The team's home games were held at Paul Eames Sports Complex.

== History ==
The Peanuts played in the South Coast League and won the league title with a 59–28 record. However, the notoriety of the Peanuts was largely built upon the managerial comeback of Wally Backman, who had been hired as manager of the Arizona Diamondbacks and fired four days later due to reported legal troubles. His return to managing and the Peanuts' 2007 season were documented by the independent TV series Playing for Peanuts.

On March 4, 2008, the Peanuts announced that pitching coach Buddy York had been promoted to manager after Wally Backman departed for the Joilet Jackhammers of the Northern League.

On March 31, 2008, the South Coast League office issued an announcement that it was suspending operations as of April 1, citing an inability to close on a large amount of debt. The league reportedly lost over a million dollars in each of its markets during its first year. While the statement claimed that it planned to resume operations in 2009, the league never returned. As a result, the Peanuts dissolved along with the league.

== 2007 season ==
| Half | Record | Finish | GB | League Standing | Postseason |
|---|---|---|---|---|---|
| 1st | 33–11 | .750 | -- | 1st | Won 1st Half Title |
| 2nd | 26–17 | .605 | 1.5 | 2nd | |
| Total | 59–28 | .678 | -- | 1st | League Champs def. Macon Music, 2 games to 1 |
