= Macon Music =

- 2007; Macon, Georgia

Minor league affiliations
- Class: Independent
- League: South Coast League

Minor league titles
- Second-half titles: 2007

Team data
- Colors: Red, navy, light blue, gray, white
- Ballpark: Luther Williams Field
- Manager: Phil Plantier

The Macon Music were a short-lived independent baseball team, based in Macon, Georgia. The club played its home games at Luther Williams Field, under manager Phil Plantier. A member of the South Coast League, Macon won the league's second half title, however they were defeated in the title series by the South Georgia Peanuts, 2 games to 1.

On March 31, 2008, the South Coast League office issued an announcement that it was suspending operations as of April 1, citing an inability to close on a large amount of debt. While the statement claimed that it planned to resume operations in 2009, however the league never returned. The Music dissolved with the league, as a result.

== Eliot Spitzer night ==
The Music planned, until the league formally ceased operations, to play in 2008. The team even made national headlines earlier that month when its website posted an Eliot Spitzer night promotion, to poke fun at the former New York governor's prostitution scandal. Among the planned highlights on Eliot Spitzer Night: Client #9 (or fan #9) will receive a free Music prize pack," the team said on its website. "Any fan with the name Eliot, Spitzer, or 'Kristen' along with any fan from New York will receive $1 off admission." The name Kristen was how the call girl is identified in investigative documents. ATMs would be available for cash withdrawals not to exceed $5,000 per hour. The team also announced it would give away a New York vacation, including a one-night stay at the Mayflower Hotel, although the hotel linked to the Spitzer scandal is actually in Washington, D.C. The Music also claimed it formally invited Spitzer to come on down and throw out the first pitch.

== 2007 season ==
| Half | Record | Finish | GB | League Standing | Postseason |
|---|---|---|---|---|---|
| 1st | 30-15 | .667 | 3.5 | 2nd | |
| 2nd | 28-16 | .636 | -- | 1st | 2nd Half Champions |
| Total | 58-31 | .652 | -- | 2nd | Lost Championship vs. South Georgia Peanuts 2 games to 1 |
