= Wilmington Waves =

Minor league baseball team

- 2001; Wilmington, North Carolina

Minor league affiliations
- Class: Class A
- League: South Atlantic League
- Division: Southern Division

Major league affiliations
- Team: Los Angeles Dodgers

Minor league titles
- League titles: None
- Division titles: None

Team data
- Ballpark: Brooks Field

The Wilmington Waves were a minor league baseball team in Wilmington, North Carolina in the 2001 baseball season. They were a Low-A class team that played in the South Atlantic League, and were a farm team of the Los Angeles Dodgers for the franchise’s only year in Wilmington. They played all of their home games at Brooks Field, on the campus of the University of North Carolina Wilmington.

The team performed well, going 75-63 in 2001, with a 20-year-old Shane Victorino as one of the team's best hitters. But despite the on-field success, Brooks Field was a poor fit for the Waves. They were sold before the 2002 season to an ownership group that moved the team to Albany, Georgia, in part because the team could not sell beer or collect parking fees at Brooks Field. The team purported to have lost $1 million in their season in Wilmington. The franchise became the South Georgia Waves.

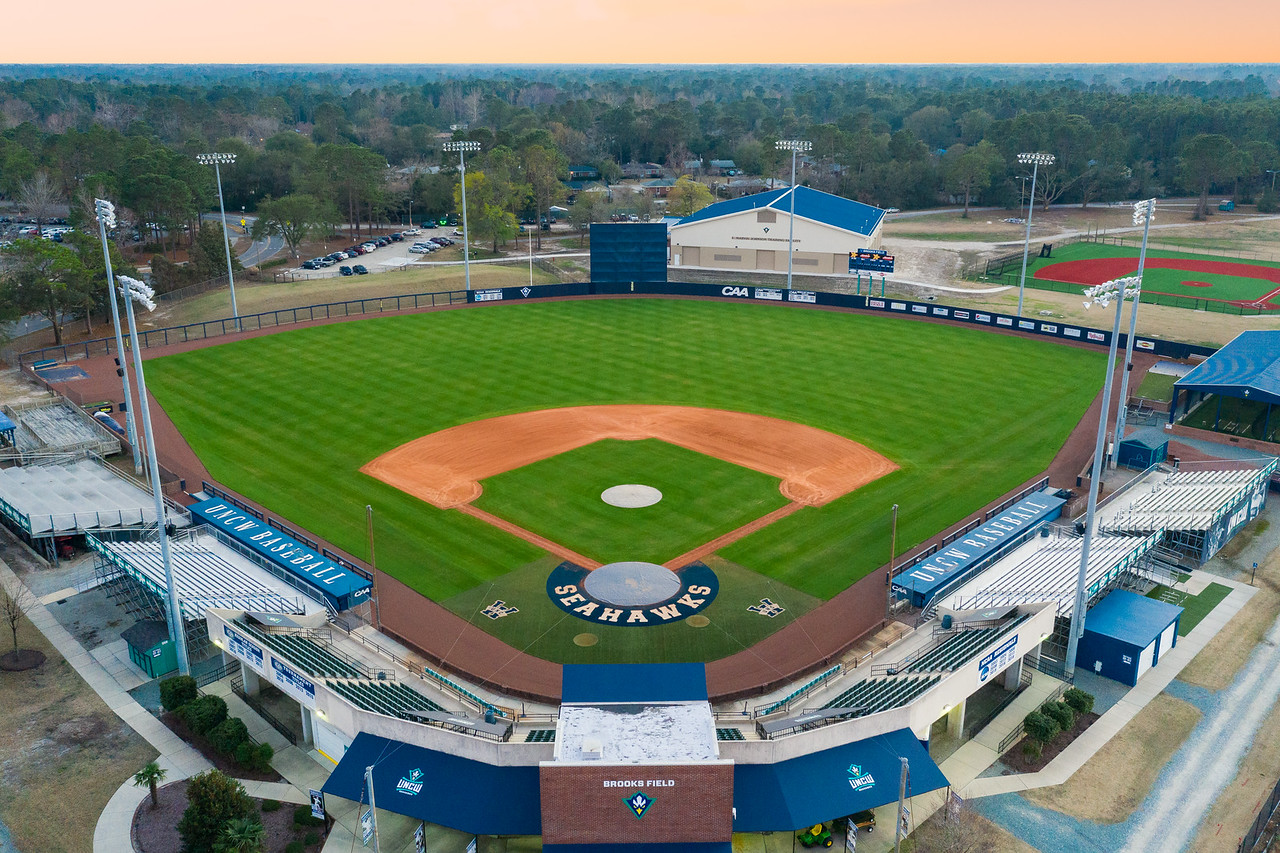
Brooks Field, the Waves' home field

== List of Wilmington Waves players in the MLB ==
All players are listed in alphabetical order by their surname, with the year they played for Wilmington in parentheses.

- Reggie Abercrombie (2001)
- Willy Aybar (2001)
- Joselo Díaz (2001)
- Ben Diggins (2001)
- Tom Goodwin (2001)
- Joel Hanrahan (2001)
- Koyie Hill (2001)
- Ruddy Lugo (2001)
- Agustín Montero (2001)
- Jason Repko (2001)
- Lino Urdaneta (2001)
- Shane Victorino (2001)

== Year-by-year record ==
Year	Record	Finish	Manager	Playoffs
2001	75-63	5th	Dino Ebel	
