= South Coast League =

Former baseball league in Georgia, US

- South Coast League logo
- Sport: Baseball
- Founded: 2006
- Folded: 2008
- No. of teams: 6
- Country: United States
- Last champion: South Georgia Peanuts
- Website: www.southcoastleague.com

The South Coast League of Professional Baseball (SCL), based in Conyers, Georgia, was a professional, independent baseball organization located in the Southeastern United States. It operated in cities not served by Major or Minor League Baseball teams and was not affiliated with either. It folded after its first season in 2007.

== History ==
The league was formed in October 2006. In a press release in October, league Chief Executive Officer Jamie Toole, a former Carolina League executive with a number of teams, cited the desire to field professional baseball teams in municipalities that lacked access to professional baseball; however, the Aiken Foxhounds and Anderson Joes were based in metropolitan areas with an existing team in the MiLB-affiliated Class A South Atlantic League (the Augusta GreenJackets and Greenville Drive, respectively).

The league's only season was documented by the TV show, "Playing for Peanuts."

On March 29, 2008, Sports Illustrated reported that league CEO Jamie Toole had resigned and the league had canceled the 2008 season.

== 2007 League standings ==
The 2007 South Coast League had teams playing in six U.S. markets.

=== First half ===
- South Georgia Peanuts 33–11 (.750)
- Macon Music 30–15 (.667)
- Bradenton Juice 24–20 (.545)
- Aiken Foxhounds 22–23 (.489)
- Anderson Joes 13–32 (.289)
- Charlotte County Redfish 12–33 (.267)

=== Second half ===
- Macon Music 28–16 (.636)
- South Georgia Peanuts 26–17 (.605)
- Anderson Joes 24–20 (.545)
- Bradenton Juice 23–22 (.511)
- Aiken Foxhounds 18–23 (.439)
- Charlotte County Redfish 10–31 (.244)

== Notes ==
- Macon, Georgia was announced as the first team of the league.
- Wally Backman was the manager of the South Georgia Peanuts.
