= 1990 Toronto Blue Jays season =

1990 Toronto Blue Jays
- League: American League
- Division: East
- Ballpark: SkyDome
- City: Toronto
- Record: 86–76 (.531)
- Divisional place: 2nd
- Owners: Labatt Breweries, Imperial Trust, Canadian Imperial Bank of Commerce
- General managers: Pat Gillick
- Managers: Cito Gaston
- Television: CFTO-TV (Don Chevrier, Tommy Hutton, Fergie Olver); The Sports Network (Jim Hughson, Buck Martinez)
- Radio: CJCL (AM) (Jerry Howarth, Tom Cheek)

The 1990 Toronto Blue Jays season was the franchise's 14th season of Major League Baseball. It resulted in the Blue Jays finishing second in the American League East with a record of 86 wins and 76 losses. It was their first full season in the SkyDome, where an MLB attendance record of 3,885,284 was set that year. The Blue Jays led the division by 1½ games over the Boston Red Sox with one week left in the season. However, they then proceeded to drop six of their last eight games, losing the division title to the Red Sox by a two-game margin.

== Transactions ==
Transactions by the Toronto Blue Jays during the off-season before the 1990 season.

=== October 1989 ===
October 15	DeWayne Buice granted free agency. Mark Ross granted free agency.
October 20	Released Ozzie Virgil Jr.
October 22	Enrique Burgos granted free agency. Chico Walker granted free agency.

=== November 1989 ===
November 13	Tom Lawless granted free agency (signed with the Toronto Blue Jays to a one-year, $250,000 contract on December 7, 1989). Lee Mazzilli granted free agency. Lloyd Moseby granted free agency (signed with the Detroit Tigers to a two-year, $3 million contract on December 7, 1989). Mookie Wilson granted free agency (signed with the Toronto Blue Jays to a two-year, $2.75 million contract on November 27, 1989).
November 20	Player rights of Alexis Infante sold to the Atlanta Braves.
November 27	Re-signed free agent Mookie Wilson to a two-year, $2.75 million contract.

=== December 1989 ===
December 4	Sil Campusano drafted by the Philadelphia Phillies in the 1989 MLB Rule 5 draft. Xavier Hernandez drafted by the Houston Astros in the 1989 MLB Rule 5 draft. Steve Wapnick drafted by the Detroit Tigers in the 1989 MLB Rule 5 draft.
December 5	Drafted Mike Maksudian from the Miami Miracle of the FSL in the 1989 Minor League Draft.
December 7	Re-signed free agent Tom Lawless to a one-year, $250,000 contract. Acquired Paul Kilgus from the Chicago Cubs for José Núñez.
December 17	Acquired Ricky Trlicek from the Atlanta Braves for Kevin Batiste and Ernie Whitt.

=== January 1990 ===
January 10	Signed amateur free agent Tilson Brito to a contract. Signed amateur free agent José Herrera to a contract. Signed amateur free agent Sandy Martínez to a contract.
January 23	Signed amateur free agent Giovanni Carrara to a contract.
January 29	Signed free agent Jim Eppard from the California Angels to a contract.

=== February 1990 ===
February 2	Re-signed free agent Ozzie Virgil Jr. to a one-year, $275,000 contract.

== Regular season ==
The 1990 season belonged to third baseman Kelly Gruber. He had career highs in home runs and RBIs, with 31 and 118, respectively. Along with outfielder George Bell and pitcher Dave Stieb, Gruber was named an American League All-Star, stealing two bases in the All-Star Game on July 10 at Chicago's Wrigley Field. A finalist for the American League MVP Award, at season's end he was named the AL's Silver Slugger and Gold Glove Award winner at third base.

The Blue Jays were involved in two no-hitters during the 1990 season. On June 29, Dave Stewart of the Oakland Athletics no-hit them by a score of 5–0. On September 2, Jays ace Dave Stieb finally got the no-hitter that had eluded him, blanking the Cleveland Indians 3–0.

=== Opening Day starters ===
- George Bell, OF
- Junior Felix, OF
- Tony Fernández, SS
- Kelly Gruber, 3B
- Nelson Liriano, 2B
- Fred McGriff, 1B
- Greg Myers, C
- John Olerud, DH
- Dave Stieb, P
- Mookie Wilson, OF

=== Season standings ===
AL East
Team	W	L	Pct.	GB	Home	Road
Boston Red Sox	88	74	.543	—	51‍–‍30	37‍–‍44
Toronto Blue Jays	86	76	.531	2	44‍–‍37	42‍–‍39
Detroit Tigers	79	83	.488	9	39‍–‍42	40‍–‍41
Cleveland Indians	77	85	.475	11	41‍–‍40	36‍–‍45
Baltimore Orioles	76	85	.472	11½	40‍–‍40	36‍–‍45
Milwaukee Brewers	74	88	.457	14	39‍–‍42	35‍–‍46
New York Yankees	67	95	.414	21	37‍–‍44	30‍–‍51

=== Record vs. opponents ===
1990 American League record Sources:
Team	BAL	BOS	CAL	CWS	CLE	DET	KC	MIL	MIN	NYY	OAK	SEA	TEX	TOR
Baltimore	—	4–9	7–5	6–6	6–7	6–7	8–3	7–6	6–6	6–7	4–8	3–9	8–4	5–8
Boston	9–4	—	7–5	6–6	9–4	8–5	4–8	5–8	4–8	9–4	4–8	8–4	5–7	10–3
California	5–7	5–7	—	5–8	7–5	5–7	7–6	7–5	9–4	6–6	4–9	5–8	8–5	7–5
Chicago	6–6	6–6	8–5	—	5–7	5–7	9–4	10–2	7–6	10–2	8–5	8–5	7–6	5–7
Cleveland	7–6	4–9	5–7	7–5	—	5–8	6–6	9–4	7–5	5–8	4–8	7–5	7–5	4–9
Detroit	7–6	5–8	7–5	7–5	8–5	—	5–7	3–10	6–6	7–6	6–6	7–5	6–6	5–8
Kansas City	3–8	8–4	6–7	4–9	6–6	7–5	—	4–8	8–5	8–4	4–9	7–6	5–8	5–7
Milwaukee	6–7	8–5	5–7	2–10	4–9	10–3	8–4	—	4–8	6–7	5–7	4–8	5–7	7–6
Minnesota	6–6	8–4	4–9	6–7	5–7	6–6	5–8	8–4	—	6–6	6–7	6–7	5–8	3–9
New York	7–6	4–9	6–6	2–10	8–5	6–7	4–8	7–6	6–6	—	0–12	9–3	3–9	5–8
Oakland	8–4	8–4	9–4	5–8	8–4	6–6	9–4	7–5	7–6	12–0	—	9–4	8–5	7–5
Seattle	9–3	4–8	8–5	5–8	5–7	5–7	6–7	8–4	7–6	3–9	4–9	—	7–6	6–6
Texas	4–8	7–5	5–8	6–7	5–7	6–6	8–5	7–5	8–5	9–3	5–8	6–7	—	7–5
Toronto	8–5	3–10	5–7	7–5	9–4	8–5	7–5	6–7	9–3	8–5	5–7	6–6	5–7	—

=== Transactions ===
Transactions for the Toronto Blue Jays during the 1990 regular season.

==== May 1990 ====
May 1	Steve Wapnick returned by the Detroit Tigers.
May 8	Released Mike Flanagan.

==== June 1990 ====
June 18	Selected Kenny Williams off of waivers from the Detroit Tigers.

==== July 1990 ====
July 22	Released Tom Lawless.
July 27	Acquired John Candelaria from the Minnesota Twins for Nelson Liriano and Pedro Muñoz.

==== September 1990 ====
September 16	Acquired Bud Black from the Cleveland Indians for Mauro Gozzo and players to be named later (Steve Cummings on September 21, 1990, and Alex Sanchez on September 24, 1990).
September 24	Signed amateur free agent Rich Butler to a contract. Signed amateur free agent Rob Butler to a contract. Selected Rick Luecken off of waivers from the Atlanta Braves.

=== 1990 MLB draft ===
- June 4, 1990: 1990 Major League Baseball draft
  - Steve Karsay was drafted by the Jays in the 1st round (22nd pick).
  - Future Heisman Trophy winner Chris Weinke was drafted by the Blue Jays. Player signed August 20, 1990.
  - Felipe Crespo was drafted by the Blue Jays in the 3rd round. Player signed September 22, 1990.
  - Howard Battle was drafted by the Blue Jays in the 4th round. Player signed June 6, 1990.
  - Ricardo Jordan was drafted by the Blue Jays in the 37th round.

==== Eric Lindros ====
The hype around Eric Lindros during his early career led to an exclusive deal with sports card manufacturer SCORE. Attempting to leverage this arrangement as much as possible, he was even featured on a baseball card showing him as a third baseman for the Toronto Blue Jays, although he never actually played baseball. He was only there taking batting practice one day.

== Roster ==
1990 Toronto Blue Jays
Roster
Pitchers: 34 Jim Acker; 35 Bud Black; 27 Willie Blair; 48 John Candelaria; 55 John Cerutti; 32 Steve Cummings; 46 Mike Flanagan; 46 Tom Gilles; 50 Tom Henke; 22 Jimmy Key; 39 Paul Kilgus; 28 Al Leiter; 38 Rick Luecken; 45 Bob MacDonald; 37 Dave Stieb; 30 Todd Stottlemyre; 31 Duane Ward; 36 David Wells; 44 Frank Wills	Catchers: 10 Pat Borders; 59 Carlos Diaz; 21 Greg Myers; 26 Ozzie Virgil Jr.; Infielders: 1 Tony Fernández; 17 Kelly Gruber; 18 Tom Lawless; 4 Manuel Lee; 2 Nelson Liriano; 19 Fred McGriff; 5 Rance Mulliniks; 9 John Olerud; 16 Tom Quinlan; 6 Luis Sojo	Outfielders: 11 George Bell; 20 Rob Ducey; 47 Junior Félix; 24 Glenallen Hill; 40 Mark Whiten; 12 Kenny Williams; 3 Mookie Wilson; Other batters: 26 Jim Eppard	Manager: 43 Cito Gaston; Coaches: 42 Galen Cisco (pitching); 7 John McLaren (third base); 25 Mike Squires (first base); 8 John Sullivan (bullpen); 15 Gene Tenace (hitting)

== Game log ==
1990 Game Log
April: 12–9 (Home: 9–4; Away: 3–5)

#	Date	Opponent	Score	Win	Loss	Save	Attendance	Record
1	April 9	@ Rangers	2–4	Ryan (1–0)	Stottlemyre (0–1)	Russell (1)	40,907	0–1
2	April 10	Rangers	2–1	Stieb (1–0)	Hough (0–1)	Wells (1)	49,673	1–1
3	April 11	Rangers	5–11	Brown (1–0)	Cerutti (0–1)	Jeffcoat (1)	35,301	1–2
4	April 12	Rangers	7–1	Flanagan (1–0)	Moyer (0–1)		35,354	2–2
5	April 13	@ Royals	3–1	Key (1–0)	Davis (0–1)	Ward (1)	20,522	3–2
6	April 14	@ Royals	1–3	Saberhagen (1–0)	Stottlemyre (0–2)	Davis (2)	25,930	3–3
7	April 15	@ Royals	5–4	Stieb (2–0)	Crawford (0–1)	Wells (2)	21,925	4–3
8	April 16	Orioles	4–2	Cerutti (1–1)	Tibbs (0–1)	Henke (1)	40,301	5–3
9	April 17	Orioles	8–2	Flanagan (2–0)	Ballard (0–2)		38,212	6–3
10	April 18	Orioles	5–8	Harnisch (1–0)	Wills (0–1)	Olson (3)	41,181	6–4
11	April 20	Royals	17–6	Stottlemyre (1–2)	Saberhagen (1–1)		49,151	7–4
12	April 21	Royals	5–1	Stieb (3–0)	Gubicza (1–2)		49,121	8–4
13	April 22	Royals	1–7	Gordon (1–0)	Cerutti (1–2)		49,056	8–5
14	April 23	Indians	12–9	Wills (1–1)	Wickander (0–1)	Ward (2)	34,139	9–5
15	April 24	Indians	4–3	Key (2–0)	Swindell (1–2)	Wells (3)	35,203	10–5
16	April 25	Indians	5–3	Stottlemyre (2–2)	Nichols (0–1)	Ward (3)	38,168	11–5
17	April 26	Indians	3–4	Candiotti (3–0)	Stieb (3–1)	Jones (5)	44,174	11–6
18	April 27	@ White Sox	1–6	Hibbard (2–1)	Cerutti (1–3)		10,965	11–7
19	April 28	@ White Sox	4–5	Kutzler (1–0)	Flanagan (2–1)	Thigpen (5)	15,395	11–8
20	April 29	@ White Sox	3–10	King (1–0)	Key (2–1)	Edwards (1)	12,936	11–9
21	April 30	@ Indians	10–4	Stottlemyre (3–2)	Bearse (0–2)		6,254	12–9

May: 14–14 (Home: 5–9; Away: 9–5)

#	Date	Opponent	Score	Win	Loss	Save	Attendance	Record
22	May 1	@ Indians	4–3	Stieb (4–1)	Candiotti (3–1)	Henke (2)	5,111	13–9
23	May 2	@ Indians	0–3	Black (3–0)	Cerutti (1–4)	Jones (7)	8,801	13–10
24	May 4	Tigers	1–3	Petry (2–1)	Flanagan (2–2)	Henneman (6)	49,146	13–11
25	May 5	Tigers	5–1	Stottlemyre (4–2)	Robinson (1–3)		49,219	14–11
26	May 6	Tigers	11–7	Key (3–1)	Dubois (0–1)		49,206	15–11
27	May 7	White Sox	6–1	Stieb (5–1)	McDowell (1–2)		41,384	16–11
28	May 8	White Sox	1–4	Hibbard (3–2)	Cerutti (1–5)	Thigpen (7)	41,101	16–12
29	May 9	White Sox	4–3	Wills (2–1)	Edwards (0–1)	Ward (4)	43,128	17–12
30	May 10	@ Tigers	5–10	Robinson (2–3)	Stottlemyre (4–3)		11,296	17–13
31	May 11	@ Tigers	4–2	Key (4–1)	Dubois (0–2)	Henke (3)	17,376	18–13
--	May 12	@ Tigers	Postponed (rain) Rescheduled for May 14					
32	May 13	@ Tigers	6–3	Wells (1–0)	Morris (2–5)		17,068	19–13
33	May 14	@ Tigers	8–3 (10)	Ward (1–0)	Henneman (0–3)		10,833	20–13
34	May 15	Mariners	3–4 (10)	Comstock (1–1)	Acker (0–1)	Schooler (10)	41,108	20–14
35	May 16	Mariners	2–4	Holman (6–2)	Stottlemyre (4–4)	Schooler (11)	45,640	20–15
36	May 17	Mariners	6–14	Johnson (3–2)	Key (4–2)		47,283	20–16
37	May 18	Angels	2–4	Abbott (2–3)	Stieb (5–2)	Eichhorn (6)	49,339	20–17
38	May 19	Angels	11–9	Fraser (1–2)	Ward (1–1)	Eichhorn (7)	49,335	20–18
39	May 20	Angels	5–1	Wills (3–1)	Langston (3–4)	Henke (4)	49,421	21–18
40	May 21	Athletics	1–4	Welch (5–2)	Stottlemyre (4–5)	Eckersley (10)	49,471	21–19
41	May 22	Athletics	4–5	Young (2–1)	Wills (3–2)	Eckersley (11)	49,559	21–20
42	May 23	@ Angels	4–5	Bailes (1–0)	Ward (1–2)		25,179	21–21
43	May 24	@ Angels	3–4 (11)	Harvey (2–1)	Henke (0–1)		24,460	21–22
44	May 25	@ Mariners	3–1 (11)	Acker (1–1)	Swift (2–2)	Henke (5)	15,334	22–22
45	May 26	@ Mariners	11–4	Wills (4–2)	Holman (6–3)		25,004	23–22
46	May 27	@ Mariners	5–1	Cerutti (2–5)	Johnson (3–3)		25,858	24–22
47	May 28	@ Athletics	1–0	Stieb (6–2)	Moore (4–4)		45,005	25–22
48	May 29	@ Athletics	2–1	Wells (2–0)	Stewart (8–2)	Henke (6)	25,255	26–22
49	May 30	@ Athletics	5–8	Burns (1–0)	Blair (0–1)	Eckersley (14)	24,257	26–23

June: 15–13 (Home: 6–8; Away: 9–5)

#	Date	Opponent	Score	Win	Loss	Save	Attendance	Record
50	June 1	Brewers	1–7	Higuera (5–1)	Stottlemyre (4–6)	Crim (3)	49,698	26–24
51	June 2	Brewers	6–7	Fossas (2–3)	Wells (2–1)	Plesac (10)	49,553	26–25
52	June 3	Brewers	7–4	Stieb (7–2)	Knudson (3–3)	Henke (7)	49,702	27–25
53	June 5	Twins	7–3	Wells (3–1)	Smith (4–5)		49,741	28–25
54	June 6	Twins	5–12	Candelaria (7–1)	Blair (0–2)		49,652	28–26
55	June 7	Twins	10–3	Stottlemyre (5–6)	Tapani (6–4)		49,845	29–26
56	June 8	@ Brewers	11–5	Gilles (1–0)	Crim (2–2)	Henke (8)	27,021	30–26
57	June 9	@ Brewers	7–3	Stieb (8–2)	Bosio (4–4)		46,612	31–26
58	June 10	@ Brewers	13–5	Wells (4–1)	Navarro (2–2)		18,091	32–26
59	June 11	@ Brewers	1–4	Krueger (3–3)	Blair (0–3)	Plesac (11)	17,701	32–27
60	June 12	@ Twins	5–4	Stottlemyre (6–6)	Candelaria (7–2)	Ward (5)	18,298	33–27
61	June 13	@ Twins	10–1	Cerutti (3–5)	West (2–4)	Henke (9)	17,086	34–27
62	June 14	@ Twins	7–1	Stieb (9–2)	Anderson (2–9)		18,679	35–27
63	June 15	@ Yankees	5–4	Wells (5–1)	Robinson (0–5)	Henke (10)	31,827	36–27
64	June 16	@ Yankees	2–1 (11)	Wills (5–2)	Mills (0–2)	Ward (6)	26,061	37–27
65	June 17	@ Yankees	8–1	Stottlemyre (7–6)	LaPoint (4–6)		38,173	38–27
66	June 19	Red Sox	2–4	Kiecker (2–3)	Ward (1–3)	Murphy (3)	49,907	38–28
67	June 20	Red Sox	11–0	Stieb (10–2)	Gardner (1–4)	Henke (11)	49,857	39–28
68	June 21	Yankees	6–7	Mills (1–2)	Acker (1–2)	Righetti (14)	49,883	39–29
69	June 22	Yankees	7–8 (15)	Cadaret (2–4)	Blair (0–4)	Righetti (15)	49,908	39–30
70	June 23	Yankees	8–4	Stottlemyre (8–6)	Leary (3–10)	Henke (12)	49,858	40–30
71	June 24	Yankees	8–3	Cerutti (4–5)	Cary (4–3)	Acker (1)	49,806	41–30
72	June 25	@ Red Sox	8–10	Lamp (1–2)	Blair (0–5)	Reardon (11)	32,591	41–31
73	June 26	@ Red Sox	0–3	Gardner (2–4)	Wells (5–2)	Reardon (12)	23,244	41–32
74	June 27	@ Red Sox	5–9	Boddicker (10–3)	Key (4–3)	Gray (2)	32,961	41–33
75	June 28	@ Red Sox	3–4	Clemens (12–3)	Stottlemyre (8–7)	Reardon (13)	34,547	41–34
76	June 29	Athletics	0–5	Stewart (10–6)	Cerutti (4–6)		49,817	41–35
77	June 30	Athletics	4–9	Welch (13–2)	Stieb (10–3)		49,865	41–36

July: 14–12 (Home: 9–5; Away: 5–7)

#	Date	Opponent	Score	Win	Loss	Save	Attendance	Record
78	July 1	Athletics	4–3	Blair (1–5)	Burns (2–2)	Henke (13)	49,857	42–36
79	July 2	Athletics	2–3	Moore (6–7)	Key (4–4)	Eckersley (25)	49,855	42–37
80	July 3	Angels	5–2	Stottlemyre (9–7)	Blyleven (7–5)	Henke (14)	49,836	43–37
81	July 4	Angels	4–2	Cerutti (5–6)	Abbott (5–7)	Henke (15)	49,831	44–37
82	July 5	Angels	9–2	Stieb (11–3)	McCaskill (6–5)		49,838	45–37
83	July 6	Mariners	1–0	Wells (6–2)	Holman (8–7)	Henke (16)	49,872	46–37
84	July 7	Mariners	4–2	Key (5–4)	Swan (1–2)	Ward (7)	48,899	47–37
85	July 8	Mariners	3–6	Young (3–9)	Stottlemyre (9–8)		49,816	47–38
86	July 12	@ Angels	5–0	Wells (7–2)	McCaskill (6–6)		27,365	48–38
87	July 13	@ Angels	0–2	Abbott (6–7)	Stottlemyre (9–9)		35,001	48–39
88	July 14	@ Angels	7–8	Eichhorn (1–4)	Ward (1–4)		34,446	48–40
89	July 15	@ Angels	2–3	Finley (12–4)	Henke (0–2)		31,609	48–41
90	July 16	@ Mariners	4–3	Key (6–4)	Hanson (10–7)	Henke (17)	24,833	49–41
91	July 17	@ Mariners	5–7	Jackson (4–3)	Ward (1–5)	Schooler (24)	14,259	49–42
92	July 18	@ Mariners	2–5	Young (4–10)	Stottlemyre (9–10)		15,868	49–43
93	July 20	@ Athletics	8–6	Cerutti (6–6)	Young (5–4)	Henke (18)	40,171	50–43
94	July 21	@ Athletics	2–1	Stieb (12–3)	Sanderson (11–6)	Henke (19)	43,097	51–43
95	July 22	@ Athletics	0–3	Moore (9–8)	Key (6–5)	Honeycutt (4)	43,821	51–44
96	July 24	Royals	3–5 (13)	Farr (8–4)	Ward (1–6)		49,884	51–45
97	July 25	Royals	1–6	McGaffigan (1–0)	Stottlemyre (9–11)		49,855	51–46
98	July 26	Royals	7–5	Cerutti (7–6)	Appier (5–4)	Henke (20)	49,862	52–46
99	July 27	Rangers	1–0	Stieb (13–3)	Hough (7–7)	Henke (21)	49,882	53–46
100	July 28	Rangers	2–3 (13)	Arnsberg (4–1)	Wills (5–3)	Barfield (1)	49,850	53–47
101	July 29	Rangers	10–8	Acker (2–2)	McMurtry (0–1)	Candelaria (5)	49,853	54–47
102	July 30	@ Orioles	9–2	Stottlemyre (10–11)	Milacki (4–8)	Ward (8)	43,638	55–47
103	July 31	@ Orioles	4–6	McDonald (3–0)	Cerutti (7–7)	Olson (24)	37,771	55–48

August: 13–16 (Home: 5–8; Away: 8–8)

#	Date	Opponent	Score	Win	Loss	Save	Attendance	Record
104	August 1	@ Orioles	7–4	Stieb (14–3)	Ballard (1–10)	Henke (22)	40,625	56–48
105	August 2	@ Rangers	4–5 (11)	Arnsberg (5–1)	Candelaria (7–4)		30,814	56–49
106	August 3	@ Rangers	1–9	Moyer (1–3)	Wells (7–3)		23,728	56–50
107	August 4	@ Rangers	2–3	Witt (10–8)	Stottlemyre (10–12)		35,211	56–51
108	August 5	@ Rangers	6–4	Cerutti (8–7)	Ryan (11–5)	Henke (23)	41,635	57–51
109	August 6	@ Rangers	3–4	Hough (9–7)	Stieb (14–4)	Rogers (11)	28,638	57–52
110	August 7	Tigers	11–7	Key (7–5)	Morris (9–14)		49,894	58–52
111	August 8	Tigers	8–3	Wells (8–3)	Terrell (0–1)		49,897	59–52
112	August 9	Tigers	4–5	Robinson (9–9)	Stottlemyre (10–13)	Gleaton (6)	49,911	59–53
113	August 10	Twins	3–7	West (6–7)	Cerutti (8–8)		49,888	59–54
114	August 11	Twins	7–4	Stieb (15–4)	Leach (2–4)	Henke (24)	49,873	60–54
115	August 12	Twins	4–5	Anderson (5–15)	Key (7–6)		49,892	60–55
116	August 13	@ White Sox	4–3	Ward (2–6)	Thigpen (4–5)	Henke (25)	28,961	61–55
117	August 14	@ White Sox	12–4	Stottlemyre (11–13)	Hibbard (9–7)		24,314	62–55
118	August 15	@ White Sox	3–4	McDowell (9–6)	Candelaria (7–5)	Thigpen (38)	27,947	62–56
119	August 17	@ Twins	5–1	Stieb (16–4)	Erickson (3–3)	Ward (9)	28,173	63–56
120	August 18	@ Twins	3–0	Key (8–6)	Anderson (5–16)	Henke (26)	32,605	64–56
121	August 19	@ Twins	9–1	Wells (9–3)	Guthrie (4–6)		29,004	65–56
122	August 20	@ Yankees	5–6 (11)	Cadaret (5–4)	Acker (2–3)		21,661	65–57
123	August 21	@ Yankees	2–3	Cary (5–8)	Candelaria (7–6)	Guetterman (2)	22,315	65–58
124	August 22	@ Yankees	2–4	Hawkins (4–10)	Cerutti (8–9)	Righetti (27)	25,088	65–59
125	August 23	Red Sox	4–3	Henke (1–2)	Hesketh (0–1)		49,918	66–59
126	August 24	Red Sox	0–2	Kiecker (5–6)	Ward (2–7)	Gray (5)	49,914	66–60
127	August 25	Red Sox	0–1	Clemens (19–5)	Wells (9–4)		49,890	66–61
128	August 26	Red Sox	0–1	Harris (11–5)	Stottlemyre (11–14)	Gray (6)	49,897	66–62
129	August 27	Brewers	2–4	Higuera (8–6)	Acker (2–4)		49,892	66–63
130	August 28	Brewers	2–6	Navarro (5–5)	Stieb (16–5)		49,871	66–64
131	August 29	Brewers	7–3	Key (9–6)	Knudson (10–7)	Ward (10)	49,909	67–64
132	August 31	@ Indians	12–8	Acker (3–4)	Swindell (10–8)		12,508	68–64

September: 17–10 (Home: 10–3; Away: 7–7)

#	Date	Opponent	Score	Win	Loss	Save	Attendance	Record
133	September 1	@ Indians	8–0	Stottlemyre (12–14)	Candiotti (13–10)		16,547	69–64
134	September 2	@ Indians	3–0	Stieb (17–5)	Black (10–9)		23,640	70–64
135	September 3	@ Tigers	0–5	Terrell (4–2)	Key (9–7)		33,658	70–65
136	September 4	@ Tigers	1–3	Gibson (4–4)	Ward (2–8)	Henneman (20)	14,760	70–66
137	September 5	@ Tigers	7–3	Wells (10–4)	Parker (3–2)		16,677	71–66
138	September 7	White Sox	3–1	Stottlemyre (13–14)	Pérez (12–13)	Henke (27)	49,885	72–66
139	September 8	White Sox	3–0	Stieb (18–5)	Fernandez (2–3)	Henke (28)	49,898	73–66
140	September 9	White Sox	6–1	Key (10–7)	McDowell (12–7)		49,870	74–66
141	September 10	@ Royals	6–1	Wells (11–4)	Wagner (0–1)		22,158	75–66
142	September 11	@ Royals	8–4	Wills (6–3)	Stottlemyre (0–1)	Ward (11)	18,493	76–66
143	September 12	@ Royals	5–7	Gordon (11–10)	Stottlemyre (13–15)	Davis (6)	20,135	76–67
144	September 13	Orioles	3–5	Mesa (1–2)	Stieb (18–6)	Olson (31)	49,875	76–68
145	September 14	Orioles	8–7	Blair (2–5)	Olson (5–5)		49,893	77–68
146	September 15	Orioles	4–3	Blair (3–5)	Schilling (1–2)		49,888	78–68
147	September 16	Orioles	6–5	Henke (2–2)	Price (3–4)		49,886	79–68
148	September 17	Yankees	6–4	Cerutti (9–9)	Plunk (5–3)	Henke (29)	49,902	80–68
149	September 18	Yankees	3–2	Black (12–10)	Guetterman (10–7)		49,887	81–68
150	September 19	Yankees	7–6	Key (11–7)	Leary (9–19)	Henke (30)	49,890	82–68
151	September 21	Indians	1–2 (13)	Valdez (1–1)	Wills (6–4)	Jones (39)	49,894	82–69
152	September 22	Indians	2–5	Shaw (3–4)	Stottlemyre (13–16)	Jones (40)	49,883	82–70
153	September 23	Indians	5–4 (10)	Acker (4–4)	Ward (1–3)		49,901	83–70
154	September 24	@ Brewers	9–5	Key (12–7)	Navarro (7–7)	Henke (31)	8,769	84–70
155	September 25	@ Brewers	4–8	Krueger (6–8)	Black (12–11)		8,576	84–71
156	September 26	@ Brewers	0–6	Robinson (12–4)	Wells (11–5)		8,804	84–72
157	September 28	@ Red Sox	6–7	Reardon (4–3)	Henke (2–3)		35,735	84–73
158	September 29	@ Red Sox	5–7	Clemens (21–6)	Stottlemyre (13–17)	Reardon (20)	35,444	84–74
159	September 30	@ Red Sox	10–5	Key (13–7)	Hesketh (0–4)		34,400	85–74

October: 1–2 (Home: 0–0; Away: 1–2)

#	Date	Opponent	Score	Win	Loss	Save	Attendance	Record
160	October 1	@ Orioles	3–6	Mesa (3–2)	Wells (11–6)	Olson (37)	24,442	85–75
161	October 2	@ Orioles	2–1	Black (13–11)	Johnson (13–9)	Henke (32)	19,789	86–75
162	October 3	@ Orioles	2–3	Olson (6–5)	Henke (2–4)		26,913	86–76

== Player stats ==
= Indicates team leader

=== Batting ===
==== Starters by position ====
Note: Pos = Position; G = Games played; AB = At bats; H = Hits; Avg. = Batting average; HR = Home runs; RBI = Runs batted in

Pos	Player	G	AB	H	Avg.	HR	RBI
C	Pat Borders	125	346	99	.286	15	49
1B	Fred McGriff	153	557	167	.300	35	88
2B	Manuel Lee	117	391	95	.243	6	41
3B	Kelly Gruber	150	592	162	.274	31	118
SS	Tony Fernández	161	635	175	.276	4	66
LF	George Bell	142	562	149	.265	21	86
CF	Mookie Wilson	147	588	156	.265	3	51
RF	Junior Félix	127	463	122	.263	15	65
DH	John Olerud	111	358	95	.265	14	48

==== Other batters ====
Note: G = Games played; AB = At bats; H = Hits; Avg. = Batting average; HR = Home runs; RBI = Runs batted in

Player	G	AB	H	Avg.	HR	RBI
Glenallen Hill	84	260	60	.231	12	32
Greg Myers	87	250	59	.236	5	22
Nelson Liriano	50	170	36	.212	1	15
Rance Mulliniks	57	97	28	.289	2	16
Mark Whiten	33	88	24	.273	2	7
Luis Sojo	33	80	18	.225	1	9
Kenny Williams	49	72	14	.194	0	8
Rob Ducey	19	53	16	.302	0	7
Tom Lawless	15	12	1	.083	0	1
Jim Eppard	6	5	1	.200	0	0
Ozzie Virgil Jr.	3	5	0	.000	0	0
Carlos Diaz	9	3	1	.333	0	0
Tom Quinlan	1	2	1	.500	0	0

=== Pitching ===
==== Starting pitchers ====
Note: G = Games pitched; IP = Innings pitched; W = Wins; L = Losses; ERA = Earned run average; SO = Strikeouts

Player	G	IP	W	L	ERA	SO
Dave Stieb	33	208.2	18	6	2.93	125
Todd Stottlemyre	33	203.0	13	17	4.34	115
Jimmy Key	27	154.2	13	7	4.25	88
John Cerutti	30	140.0	9	9	4.76	49
Mike Flanagan	5	20.1	2	2	5.31	5

==== Other pitchers ====
Note: G = Games pitched; IP = Innings pitched; W = Wins; L = Losses; ERA = Earned run average; SO = Strikeouts

Player	G	IP	W	L	ERA	SO
David Wells	43	189.0	11	6	3.14	115
Willie Blair	27	68.2	3	5	4.06	43
John Candelaria	13	21.1	0	3	5.48	19
Bud Black	3	15.2	2	1	4.02	3
Steve Cummings	6	12.1	0	0	5.11	4

==== Relief pitchers ====
Note: G = Games pitched; W = Wins; L = Losses; SV = Saves; ERA = Earned run average; SO = Strikeouts

Player	G	W	L	SV	ERA	SO
Tom Henke	61	2	4	32	2.17	75
Duane Ward	73	2	8	11	3.45	112
Jim Acker	59	4	4	1	3.83	54
Frank Wills	44	6	4	0	4.73	72
Paul Kilgus	11	0	0	0	6.06	7
Al Leiter	4	0	0	0	0.00	5
Bob MacDonald	4	0	0	0	0.00	0
Tom Gilles	2	1	0	0	6.75	0
Rick Luecken	1	0	0	0	9.00	0

== Award winners ==
- Kelly Gruber, Player of the Month Award, September
- Kelly Gruber, Silver Slugger Award
- Kelly Gruber, Gold Glove Award

All-Star Game

- George Bell, OF
- Kelly Gruber, 3B
- Dave Stieb, P

== Farm system ==
Level	Team	League	Manager
AAA	Syracuse Chiefs	International League	Bob Bailor
AA	Knoxville Blue Jays	Southern League	John Stearns
A	Dunedin Blue Jays	Florida State League	Dennis Holmberg
A	Myrtle Beach Blue Jays	South Atlantic League	Mike Fischlin
A-Short Season	St. Catharines Blue Jays	New York–Penn League	Doug Ault
Rookie	Medicine Hat Blue Jays	Pioneer League	Garth Iorg
