= List of Toronto Blue Jays minor league affiliates =

Current Toronto Blue Jays minor league affiliate locations

The Toronto Blue Jays farm system consists of seven Minor League Baseball affiliates across the United States and in Canada and the Dominican Republic. Three teams are independently owned, while four—the Dunedin Blue Jays, Florida Complex League Blue Jays, and two Dominican Summer League Blue Jays squads—are owned by the major league club.

The Blue Jays have been affiliated with the Double-A New Hampshire Fisher Cats of the Eastern League since 2004, making it the longest-running active affiliation in the organization among teams not owned by the Blue Jays. The longest affiliation in team history was the 31-year relationship with the Triple-A International League's Syracuse Chiefs from 1978 to 2008. Their newest affiliate is the Buffalo Bisons of the International League, which became the Blue Jays' Triple-A club in 2013.

Geographically, Toronto's closest affiliate is the Buffalo Bisons, which are approximately 95 kilometres (59 mi) away. Toronto's furthest affiliate is the High-A Vancouver Canadians of the Northwest League some 3,359 kilometres (2,087 mi) away.

== Current affiliates ==
The Toronto Blue Jays farm system consists of seven minor league affiliates.

Class	Team	League	Location	Ballpark	Affiliated
Triple-A	Buffalo Bisons	International League	Buffalo, New York	Sahlen Field	2013
Double-A	New Hampshire Fisher Cats	Eastern League	Manchester, New Hampshire	Delta Dental Stadium	2003
High-A	Vancouver Canadians	Northwest League	Vancouver, British Columbia	Nat Bailey Stadium	2011
Single-A	Dunedin Blue Jays	Florida State League	Dunedin, Florida	TD Ballpark	1987
Rookie	FCL Blue Jays	Florida Complex League	Dunedin, Florida	Englebert Complex	2007
Rookie	DSL Blue Jays Red	Dominican Summer League	Boca Chica, Santo Domingo	Baseball City Complex	2025
Rookie	DSL Blue Jays Blue	Dominican Summer League	Boca Chica, Santo Domingo	Baseball City Complex	2025

== Past affiliates ==
=== Key ===
Season	Each year is linked to an article about that particular Blue Jays season.

=== 1977–1989 ===
Prior to the 1963 season, Major League Baseball (MLB) initiated a reorganization of Minor League Baseball that resulted in a reduction from six classes to four (Triple-A, Double-A, Class A, and Rookie) in response to the general decline of the minors throughout the 1950s and early-1960s when leagues and teams folded due to shrinking attendance caused by baseball fans' preference for staying at home to watch MLB games on television. The only change made within the next 27 years was Class A being subdivided for the first time to form Class A Short Season in 1966.

Season	Triple-A	Double-A	Class A	Class A Short Season	Rookie	Ref(s).
1977	—	—	—	Utica Blue Jays	—	
1978	Syracuse Chiefs	—	Dunedin Blue Jays	Utica Blue Jays	Medicine Hat Blue Jays	
1979	Syracuse Chiefs	—	Dunedin Blue Jays; Kinston Eagles	Utica Blue Jays	Medicine Hat Blue Jays	
1980	Syracuse Chiefs	Knoxville Blue Jays	Kinston Eagles	Utica Blue Jays	Medicine Hat Blue Jays	
1981	Syracuse Chiefs	Knoxville Blue Jays	Florence Blue Jays; Kinston Eagles	—	Medicine Hat Blue Jays; GCL Blue Jays	
1982	Syracuse Chiefs	Knoxville Blue Jays	Florence Blue Jays; Kinston Blue Jays	—	Medicine Hat Blue Jays; GCL Blue Jays	
1983	Syracuse Chiefs	Knoxville Blue Jays	Florence Blue Jays; Kinston Blue Jays	—	Medicine Hat Blue Jays; GCL Blue Jays	
1984	Syracuse Chiefs	Knoxville Blue Jays	Florence Blue Jays; Kinston Blue Jays	—	Medicine Hat Blue Jays; GCL Blue Jays	
1985	Syracuse Chiefs	Knoxville Blue Jays	Florence Blue Jays; Kinston Blue Jays	—	Medicine Hat Blue Jays; GCL Blue Jays	
1986	Syracuse Chiefs	Knoxville Blue Jays	Florence Blue Jays; Ventura County Gulls	St. Catharines Blue Jays	Medicine Hat Blue Jays	
1987	Syracuse Chiefs	Knoxville Blue Jays	Dunedin Blue Jays; Myrtle Beach Blue Jays	St. Catharines Blue Jays	Medicine Hat Blue Jays	
1988	Syracuse Chiefs	Knoxville Blue Jays	Dunedin Blue Jays; Myrtle Beach Blue Jays	St. Catharines Blue Jays	Medicine Hat Blue Jays	
1989	Syracuse Chiefs	Knoxville Blue Jays	Dunedin Blue Jays; Myrtle Beach Blue Jays	St. Catharines Blue Jays	Medicine Hat Blue Jays; DSL Blue Jays	

=== 1990–2020 ===
Minor League Baseball operated with six classes from 1990 to 2020. In 1990, the Class A level was subdivided for a second time with the creation of Class A-Advanced. The Rookie level consisted of domestic and foreign circuits.

Season	Triple-A	Double-A	Class A-Advanced	Class A	Class A Short Season	Rookie	Foreign Rookie	Ref(s).
1990	Syracuse Chiefs	Knoxville Blue Jays	Dunedin Blue Jays	Myrtle Beach Blue Jays	St. Catharines Blue Jays	Medicine Hat Blue Jays	DSL Blue Jays; DSL Blue Jays/Brewers	
1991	Syracuse Chiefs	Knoxville Blue Jays	Dunedin Blue Jays	Myrtle Beach Hurricanes	St. Catharines Blue Jays	Medicine Hat Blue Jays; GCL Blue Jays	DSL Blue Jays 1 DSL Blue Jays 2	
1992	Syracuse Chiefs	Knoxville Blue Jays	Dunedin Blue Jays	Myrtle Beach Hurricanes	St. Catharines Blue Jays	Medicine Hat Blue Jays; GCL Blue Jays	DSL Blue Jays East; DSL Blue Jays West	
1993	Syracuse Chiefs	Knoxville Smokies	Dunedin Blue Jays	Hagerstown Suns	St. Catharines Blue Jays	Medicine Hat Blue Jays; GCL Blue Jays	DSL Blue Jays East; DSL Blue Jays West	
1994	Syracuse Chiefs	Knoxville Smokies	Dunedin Blue Jays	Hagerstown Suns	St. Catharines Blue Jays	Medicine Hat Blue Jays; GCL Blue Jays	DSL Blue Jays 1 DSL Blue Jays 2	
1995	Syracuse Chiefs	Knoxville Smokies	Dunedin Blue Jays	Hagerstown Suns	St. Catharines Blue Jays	Medicine Hat Blue Jays; GCL Blue Jays	DSL Blue Jays	
1996	Syracuse Chiefs	Knoxville Smokies	Dunedin Blue Jays	Hagerstown Suns	St. Catharines Stompers	Medicine Hat Blue Jays	DSL Blue Jays	
1997	Syracuse SkyChiefs	Knoxville Smokies	Dunedin Blue Jays	Hagerstown Suns	St. Catharines Stompers	Medicine Hat Blue Jays	DSL Blue Jays	
1998	Syracuse SkyChiefs	Knoxville Smokies	Dunedin Blue Jays	Hagerstown Suns	St. Catharines Stompers	Medicine Hat Blue Jays	DSL Blue Jays	
1999	Syracuse SkyChiefs	Knoxville Smokies	Dunedin Blue Jays	Hagerstown Suns	St. Catharines Stompers	Medicine Hat Blue Jays	DSL Blue Jays	
2000	Syracuse SkyChiefs	Tennessee Smokies	Dunedin Blue Jays	Hagerstown Suns	Queens Kings	Medicine Hat Blue Jays	DSL Blue Jays	
2001	Syracuse SkyChiefs	Tennessee Smokies	Dunedin Blue Jays	Charleston Alley Cats	Auburn Doubledays	Medicine Hat Blue Jays	DSL Blue Jays	
2002	Syracuse SkyChiefs	Tennessee Smokies	Dunedin Blue Jays	Charleston Alley Cats	Auburn Doubledays	Medicine Hat Blue Jays	DSL Blue Jays; VSL Carora (Note: In 2002, the Blue Jays operated a Venezuelan Summer League team as a co-op with the St. Louis Cardinals.)	
2003	Syracuse SkyChiefs	New Haven Ravens	Dunedin Blue Jays	Charleston Alley Cats	Auburn Doubledays	Pulaski Blue Jays	DSL Blue Jays; VSL Cocorote (Note: In 2003, the Blue Jays operated a Venezuelan Summer League team as a co-op with the Florida Marlins.)	
2004	Syracuse SkyChiefs	New Hampshire Fisher Cats	Dunedin Blue Jays	Charleston Alley Cats	Auburn Doubledays	Pulaski Blue Jays	DSL Blue Jays	
2005	Syracuse SkyChiefs	New Hampshire Fisher Cats	Dunedin Blue Jays	Lansing Lugnuts	Auburn Doubledays	Pulaski Blue Jays	DSL Blue Jays	
2006	Syracuse SkyChiefs	New Hampshire Fisher Cats	Dunedin Blue Jays	Lansing Lugnuts	Auburn Doubledays	Pulaski Blue Jays	DSL Blue Jays; VSL Blue Jays/Twins	
2007	Syracuse Chiefs	New Hampshire Fisher Cats	Dunedin Blue Jays	Lansing Lugnuts	Auburn Doubledays	GCL Blue Jays	DSL Blue Jays 1 DSL Blue Jays 2	
2008	Syracuse Chiefs	New Hampshire Fisher Cats	Dunedin Blue Jays	Lansing Lugnuts	Auburn Doubledays	GCL Blue Jays	DSL Blue Jays 1 DSL Blue Jays 2	
2009	Las Vegas 51s	New Hampshire Fisher Cats	Dunedin Blue Jays	Lansing Lugnuts	Auburn Doubledays	GCL Blue Jays	DSL Blue Jays	
2010	Las Vegas 51s	New Hampshire Fisher Cats	Dunedin Blue Jays	Lansing Lugnuts	Auburn Doubledays	GCL Blue Jays	DSL Blue Jays	
2011	Las Vegas 51s	New Hampshire Fisher Cats	Dunedin Blue Jays	Lansing Lugnuts	Vancouver Canadians	Bluefield Blue Jays; GCL Blue Jays	DSL Blue Jays	
2012	Las Vegas 51s	New Hampshire Fisher Cats	Dunedin Blue Jays	Lansing Lugnuts	Vancouver Canadians	Bluefield Blue Jays; GCL Blue Jays	DSL Blue Jays	
2013	Buffalo Bisons	New Hampshire Fisher Cats	Dunedin Blue Jays	Lansing Lugnuts	Vancouver Canadians	Bluefield Blue Jays; GCL Blue Jays	DSL Blue Jays	
2014	Buffalo Bisons	New Hampshire Fisher Cats	Dunedin Blue Jays	Lansing Lugnuts	Vancouver Canadians	Bluefield Blue Jays; GCL Blue Jays	DSL Blue Jays	
2015	Buffalo Bisons	New Hampshire Fisher Cats	Dunedin Blue Jays	Lansing Lugnuts	Vancouver Canadians	Bluefield Blue Jays; GCL Blue Jays	DSL Blue Jays	
2016	Buffalo Bisons	New Hampshire Fisher Cats	Dunedin Blue Jays	Lansing Lugnuts	Vancouver Canadians	Bluefield Blue Jays; GCL Blue Jays	DSL Blue Jays	
2017	Buffalo Bisons	New Hampshire Fisher Cats	Dunedin Blue Jays	Lansing Lugnuts	Vancouver Canadians	Bluefield Blue Jays; GCL Blue Jays	DSL Blue Jays	
2018	Buffalo Bisons	New Hampshire Fisher Cats	Dunedin Blue Jays	Lansing Lugnuts	Vancouver Canadians	Bluefield Blue Jays; GCL Blue Jays	DSL Blue Jays	
2019	Buffalo Bisons	New Hampshire Fisher Cats	Dunedin Blue Jays	Lansing Lugnuts	Vancouver Canadians	Bluefield Blue Jays; GCL Blue Jays	DSL Blue Jays	
2020 (Note: The 2020 Minor League Baseball season was cancelled due to the COVID-19 pandemic.)	Buffalo Bisons	New Hampshire Fisher Cats	Dunedin Blue Jays	Lansing Lugnuts	Vancouver Canadians	Bluefield Blue Jays; GCL Blue Jays	DSL Blue Jays	

=== 2021–present ===
The current structure of Minor League Baseball is the result of an overall contraction of the system beginning with the 2021 season. Class A was reduced to two levels: High-A and Low-A. Low-A was reclassified as Single-A in 2022.

Season	Triple-A	Double-A	High-A	Single-A	Rookie	Foreign Rookie	Ref.
2021	Buffalo Bisons	New Hampshire Fisher Cats	Vancouver Canadians	Dunedin Blue Jays	FCL Blue Jays	DSL Blue Jays	
2022	Buffalo Bisons	New Hampshire Fisher Cats	Vancouver Canadians	Dunedin Blue Jays	FCL Blue Jays	DSL Blue Jays	
2023	Buffalo Bisons	New Hampshire Fisher Cats	Vancouver Canadians	Dunedin Blue Jays	FCL Blue Jays	DSL Blue Jays	
2024	Buffalo Bisons	New Hampshire Fisher Cats	Vancouver Canadians	Dunedin Blue Jays	FCL Blue Jays	DSL Blue Jays	
2025	Buffalo Bisons	New Hampshire Fisher Cats	Vancouver Canadians	Dunedin Blue Jays	FCL Blue Jays	DSL Blue Jays Blue; DSL Blue Jays Red	
2026	Buffalo Bisons	New Hampshire Fisher Cats	Vancouver Canadians	Dunedin Blue Jays	FCL Blue Jays	DSL Blue Jays Blue; DSL Blue Jays Red	
