= Sparrow Stadium =

Baseball stadium in Florence, South Carolina

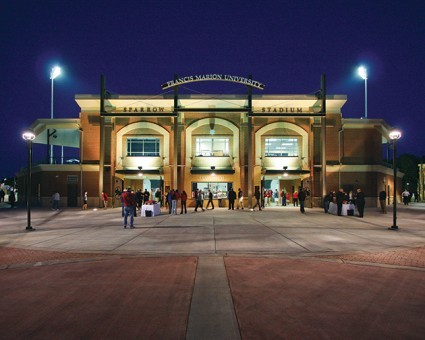
- Clifford S. Cormell Field at Sparrow Stadium

- Location within South Carolina Location within the United States
- Interactive map of Sparrow Stadium
- Full name: Clifford S. Cormell Field at Sparrow Stadium
- Address: 4700 East Palmetto Street; Florence, South Carolina 29506
- Coordinates: 34°11′38.5″N 79°39′33″W
- Capacity: 1,755
- Field size: Left field: 330 ft (100 m); Center field: 400 ft (120 m); Right field: 330 ft (100 m)

Construction
- Opened: April 11, 2012

Tenants
- Francis Marion Patriots (PBC) 2012–present Florence–Darlington Tech Stingers; Florence Flamingos (CPL) 2012–2021

Clifford S. Cormell Field at Sparrow Stadium is a baseball stadium on the campus of Francis Marion University in Florence, South Carolina. Part of the $11.1 million R. Gerald Griffin Athletic Complex, Sparrow Stadium is the home field for the Francis Marion Patriots baseball team. Sparrow Stadium also hosts some home games for the Florence–Darlington Technical College Stingers baseball team.

Sparrow Stadium was the home field of the Florence Flamingos, a collegiate summer baseball team in the Coastal Plain League, from 2012 to 2021. The then Florence RedWolves moved to Sparrow Stadium in the middle of the 2012 season from Florence's American Legion Field. Sparrow Stadium hosted the Coastal Plain League All-Star Game on July 12, 2015. The Flamingos moved in 2022 to the new Carolina Bank Field in Florence.
