= Florence Blue Jays =

- 1981–1986; Florence, SC

Minor league affiliations
- Class: Class A (1981–1986)
- League: South Atlantic League (1981–1986)
- Division: South Division

Major league affiliations
- Team: Toronto Blue Jays (1981-1986)

Minor league titles
- League titles (1): 1985
- Division titles (2): 1982, 1985

Team data
- Ballpark: American Legion Stadium (1981-1986)

The Florence Blue Jays Baseball Club was a minor league baseball team based in Florence, South Carolina.

They began play in the South Atlantic League in 1981 where they eventually captured the league title in 1985.

After the 1986 season the team relocated and became the Myrtle Beach Blue Jays (now the Hagerstown Suns).

They were a minor league club of the Toronto Blue Jays and played at American Legion Stadium.

== Notable alumni ==
- Geronimo Berroa (1985)
- Pat Borders (1983-1984, 1986) 1992 World Series Most Valuable Player
- Tony Castillo (1984)
- Rob Ducey (1985)
- Cecil Fielder (1983) 3 x MLB All-Star
- Glenallen Hill (1984)
- Jimmy Key (1982) 5 x MLB All-Star; 1987 AL ERA Title
- Nelson Liriano (1983)
- Fred McGriff (1983) 5 x MLB All-Star
- José Mesa (1983-1984) 2 x MLB All-Star
- Greg Myers (1985)
- Mike Sharperson (1982) MLB All-Star
- David Wells (1986) 3 x MLB All-Star; 239 MLB Wins

== Year-by-Year Record ==
Year	Record	Finish	Manager	Attendance	Playoffs	Team MVP
1981	66-72	6th	Dennis Holmberg	74,645		
1982	77-64	3rd	Dennis Holmberg	54,446	Defeated Charleston 2–0 in South Division championship Lost to Greensboro 3–2 in league championship	Ken Kinnard
1983	71-72	5th	Dennis Holmberg	54,779		Cecil Fielder
1984	65-73	8th	Dennis Holmberg	44,217		Pat Borders
1985	82-55	1st	Hector Torres	41,546	Defeated Columbia 2–0 in South Division championship Defeated Greensboro 3–2 in league championship	Sil Campusano
1986	56-76	7th (t)	Hector Torres	36,010		Pedro Muñoz

== South Atlantic League All-Stars ==
- First Base: Cecil Fielder (1983)
- Second Base: Garry Harris (1981)
- Shortstop: Ralph "Rocket" Wheeler (1981), Santiago Garcia (1985)
- Catcher: Dave Stenhouse (1983)
- Pitcher: Tim England (1985)
- Outfield: Sil Campusano (1985)(also league Most Valuable Player for 1985)
- Manager: Hector Torres (1985)

== South Atlantic League Season Leaders ==
=== Pitching ===
- Shutouts: 3, Doug Welenc (1981)
- Strikeouts: 186, Devallon Harper (1982)
  210, Tim Englund (1985)
- Strikeouts per 9 innings: 10.14, Devallon Harper (1982)
- Winning Percentage: .750, Tim Englund (1985) (18-6)
- Games Started: 30, Tim Englund (1985)
  28, Mike Jones (1986)
- Wins: 18, Tim Englund (1985)
- Saves: 18, Joey Pursell (1982)
- Games Finished: 46, Joey Pursell (1982)
- Runs Allowed: 116, Jose Mesa (1983)
  116, Dane Johnson (1986)
- Earned Runs Allowed: 96, Dane Johnson (1986)

=== Hitting ===
- Runs Batted In: 85, Pat Borders (1984) (tied with one other)
- Stolen Bases: 83, Bernie Tatis (1982)
- Caught Stealing: 18, Bernie Tatis (1982)
- Slugging Percentage: .443, Pat Borders (1984)
- At Bats: 502, Webster Garrison (1984)
- Doubles: 35, Santiago Garcia (1985)
- Struck Out: 208, Darrell Landrum (1985)(tied all-time league record)
  161, Wayne Davis (1986)
