= American Legion Field =

American Legion Field may refer to:

- American Legion Field (Danville), a baseball venue in Danville, Virginia, home of the Danville Otterbots of the collegiate summer baseball Appalachian League
- American Legion Field (Florence), a baseball venue in Florence, South Carolina, former home (1998-2012) of the Florence RedWolves of the collegiate summer baseball Coastal Plain League
