= Richie Hebner =

American baseball player (born 1947)

- Third baseman
- Born: November 26, 1947 (age 78); Brighton, Massachusetts, U.S.
- Batted: Left Threw: Right

MLB debut
- September 23, 1968, for the Pittsburgh Pirates

Last MLB appearance
- October 3, 1985, for the Chicago Cubs

MLB statistics
- Batting average: .276
- Home runs: 203
- Runs batted in: 890
- Stats at Baseball Reference

Teams
- Pittsburgh Pirates (1968–1976); Philadelphia Phillies (1977–1978); New York Mets (1979); Detroit Tigers (1980–1982); Pittsburgh Pirates (1982–1983); Chicago Cubs (1984–1985)

Career highlights and awards
- World Series champion (1971)

Richard Joseph Hebner (born November 26, 1947) is an American former professional baseball player and coach. He played in Major League Baseball as a third baseman from 1968 through 1985, most prominently as a member of the Pittsburgh Pirates teams that won five National League Eastern Division titles in six years between 1970 and 1975 and won the World Series in 1971. After his playing career, Hebner spent several years as a hitting coach at the major league and minor league levels. He also managed minor league teams in the Pirates, Toronto Blue Jays and Baltimore Orioles organizations.

== Early years ==
Hebner was born in Brighton, Massachusetts, a neighborhood of Boston. He was known for working as a gravedigger at a cemetery run by his father and brother, Dennis, during the offseason. The left-handed batting Hebner threw right-handed, and was originally a shortstop when he was drafted by the Pittsburgh Pirates in the first round (15 overall) of the 1966 MLB draft out of Norwood High School. He was moved to third base in the minors, where he batted .308 with 12 home runs and 84 runs batted in (RBI) over three seasons before receiving a September call-up to the majors in 1968.

Hebner also was quite the hockey player at Norwood, where he set a Bay State League record for career goals as one of the elite players in Massachusetts history. So physically dominant was the 6-foot, 210-pound center that he became villainized by rival fans. He was sometimes called "The Ted Williams of the Bay State League" because of the volume of catcalls that came his way. During his Pirates career, team broadcaster Bob Prince commonly referred to him as "Puck" in tribute to his hockey roots.

== Pittsburgh Pirates ==
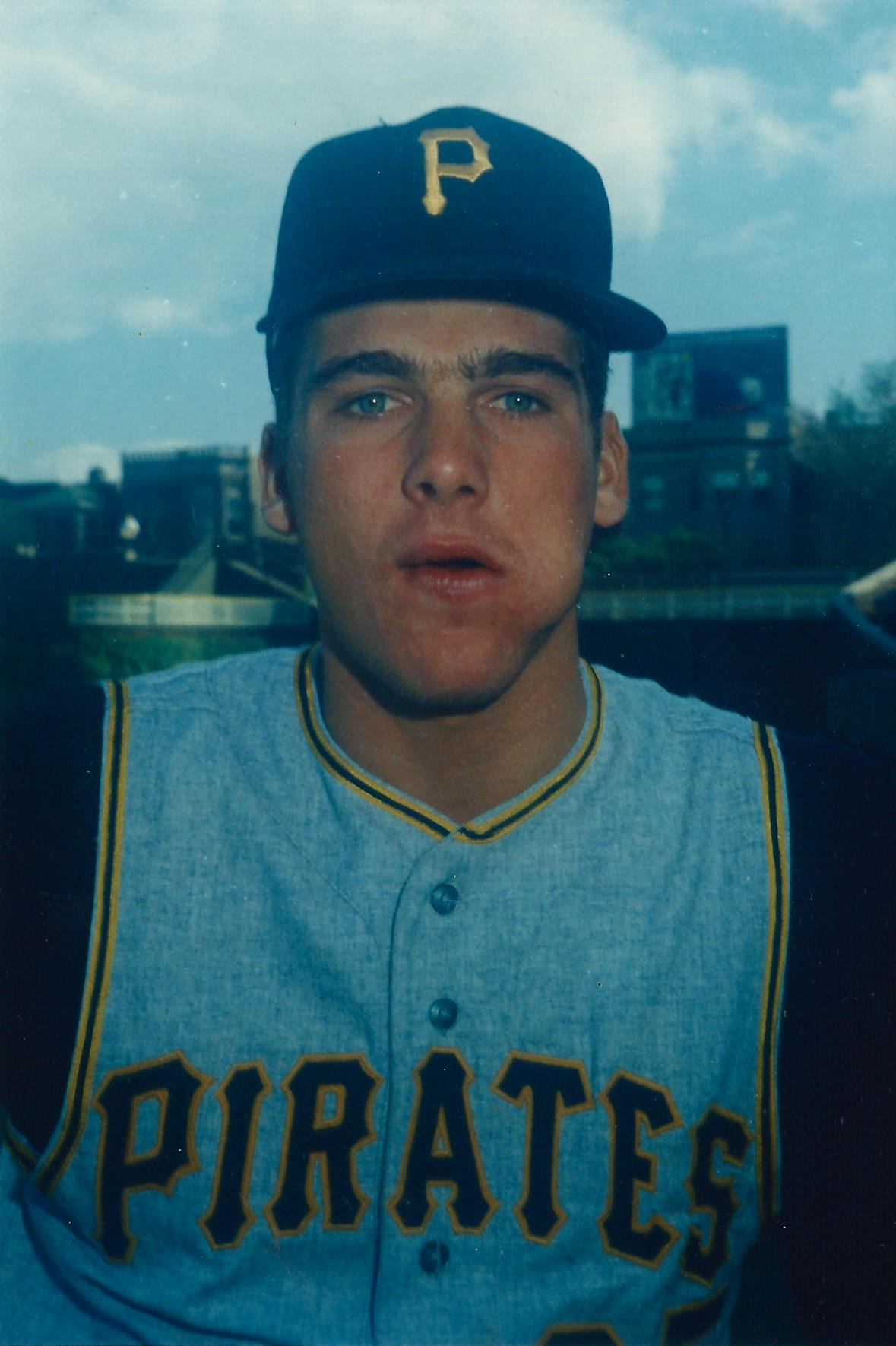
Undated photo of Hebner

When Maury Wills was selected by the Montreal Expos in the 1968 Major League Baseball expansion draft, it created a hole at third base that Hebner was expected to fill. Hebner got off to a torrid start to his rookie season. His batting average was as high as .398 in mid-May before he faltered late in the season. He closed with a .301 batting average, eight homers and 47 RBI.

Hebner put up similar numbers in 1970 (.290 average, 11 home runs, 46 RBIs), but crushed Chicago Cubs pitching (.333 average, 3 home runs, 13 RBI in 15 games) to help the Pirates capture the National League East by five games over their division rivals. While his team was swept by the favored Cincinnati Reds in the 1970 National League Championship Series, Hebner was one of its few players to have a productive series. He finished with four hits in six at-bats and two walks.

Whereas his batting average (.271) dipped in 1971, Hebner's power numbers increased. He clubbed 17 homers and drove in 67 runs. The Pirates repeated as division champions to face the San Francisco Giants in the 1971 National League Championship Series, which saw Hebner step up in a big way.

With the series tied at one game apiece and the Pirates ahead in the third game, 1–0, Hebner committed a throwing error in the sixth inning that allowed a run to score. He redeemed himself two innings later, hitting a game-winning solo shot off Giants ace Juan Marichal to give his team a 2–1 lead in the series.

Hebner provided similar heroics in the fourth game of the NLCS with another future Hall of Fame pitcher on the mound. The Giants led 5–2 when Hebner hit a three-run home run off Gaylord Perry to tie the score. The Pirates went on to a 9–5 victory and a date with the Baltimore Orioles in the World Series.

Hebner continued his trend of hitting home runs off Hall of Famers, as the only scoring the Pirates did off Jim Palmer in the second game of the series was Hebner's three-run homer. The Pirates went on to win the Fall Classic in seven games.

Hebner hit 19 home runs and batted an even .300 in 1972 to help his team cruise to the postseason for the third straight year. He hit a career-high 25 home runs in 1973, the most memorable of which came when the St. Louis Cardinals and Pirates went into extra innings in the first game of a September 3 doubleheader. With the two teams battling for first place in the division, Hebner led off the bottom of the thirteenth inning with a walk-off inside-the-park home run.

Both teams would eventually surrender the division to the New York Mets in 1973, but they would again find themselves in a tight race in 1974. Hebner hit a three-run home run off Cardinals closer Al Hrabosky at Three Rivers Stadium on September 19 to carry his team to an 8-6 victory. Four days later, his team would travel to St. Louis. The Pirates' Jim Rooker and Cardinals' Lynn McGlothen both pitched masterfully, as the game headed into extra innings scoreless. In the top of the tenth, Hebner drove in Miguel Dilone for the only run of the game. They would go on to win the division by a game and a half over the Cards.

After batting a career low .246, and seeing a dropoff in every offensive category in 1975, Hebner's salary was cut by the Pirates for 1976. Hebner was unhappy with his club's decision, and made his feelings known to the fans and media. Coupled with an abysmal month of May (.149 batting average, 5 RBI), this landed Hebner square in the crosshairs of Pirates fans and sports writers. After hovering in the low .200s for most of the 1976 season, he rebounded with an excellent month of September to bring his season average to .249 with eight home runs and 51 RBIs (both even further dropoffs from the previous season). Needing a change in scenery, Hebner opted to play out his contract and become a free agent at the end of the season. Pirates general manager Pete Peterson attempted to dissuade Hebner from signing with another team, and offered to match any dollar offer he received elsewhere. Regardless, Hebner signed with the division rival Philadelphia Phillies.

== Philadelphia Phillies ==
With All-Star and Gold Glove winner Mike Schmidt manning third base, the Phillies shifted Hebner (who had never excelled defensively at third base) across the diamond to first. Hebner did well in his new position. He batted .285 with eighteen home runs and 62 RBI to help the Phillies return to the postseason for a second year in a row.

Hebner was part of a controversial play in the 1977 National League Championship Series. With the series tied at one game apiece, and the Phillies holding onto a 5-3 lead in game three at Veterans Stadium, Dusty Baker and Rick Monday led off the Dodger half of the ninth inning with ground outs, tying Hebner for the NLCS record for putouts with fourteen. After a single by Vic Davalillo and double by Manny Mota scoring Davalillo, Davey Lopes hit a ground ball to third that Schmidt was unable to handle cleanly. Phillies shortstop Larry Bowa quickly picked up the ball, and hurled it to Hebner for what appeared to be the final out of the game, and a National League record fifteenth putout for Hebner. First-base umpire Bruce Froemming called Lopes safe, however, allowing Mota to score the tying run. After a botched pickoff attempt moved Lopes to second, Bill Russell drove him home with a single to center for the game-winning run.

The Phillies won their division again in 1978, only to fall to the Dodgers in the National League Championship Series for a second year in a row. Believing that his team was one piece away from being a World Series team, Phillies GM Paul Owens heavily pursued Cincinnati Reds free agent Pete Rose, with the intention of converting him into a first baseman. When Rose signed a four-year deal with the club on December 5, Hebner became trade bait for a much needed starting pitcher.

Hebner was outspoken during spring training 1979 about his disappointment over the signing of Rose. After considering moving Hebner to second base or into the outfield, the Phillies returned to plan A, and put him on the trading block for a starting pitcher. On March 27, he and minor leaguer José Moreno were traded to the New York Mets for Nino Espinosa.

== New York Mets ==
The much-hyped new acquisition was sold to Mets fans as the savior who would turn the struggling franchise around. He went four-for-five with a home run, two doubles and four RBIs in his first game as a Met, but it was obvious that Hebner, who was used to playing for contenders, hated playing for a team that consistently finished in last place in the NL East. He also did not take well to returning to third base after two seasons away from the "hot corner," displaying limited range and logging a below average .940 fielding percentage for the season.

As the result of an umpire strike, MLB went with replacement umpires to open the 1979 season. They often received the brunt of Hebner's frustration. On April 15, the Mets faced Hebner's former franchise, the Phillies, in a doubleheader. Home plate umpire Dave Pallone called a strike on Hebner in his first at-bat in the first game that Hebner believed was high. Hebner offered an obscenity laced opinion of the call before grounding out to second. As he ran out the ground ball, he shoved Pete Rose at first base. He then returned to home plate yelling and bumping Pallone about the called strike. Along the way, Hebner was ejected from the game, and needed to be restrained by teammates and coaches.

He also had a run-in with Lanny Harris on August 19 at Riverfront Stadium. With the Mets trailing the Reds 5-2, Hebner led off the sixth inning with a walk. There was a play at the plate as he attempted to score all the way from first on Ed Kranepool's double. Though instant replay showed that Hebner clearly touched home plate before Johnny Bench's tag, Harris called him out. A huge argument ensued with Hebner once again being ejected.

He batted .182 in July, and .230 with no home runs and six RBIs in August. He soon began feeling the ire of the frustrated Mets fan base, and once flipped-off the Shea Stadium crowd following a strikeout to show them that the feeling was mutual. Hebner ended the season tied with Lee Mazzilli for the team lead in RBIs with 79. Regardless, on October 31, 1979, the Mets traded Hebner to the Detroit Tigers for Phil Mankowski and former Met Jerry Morales.

== Detroit Tigers ==
Hebner began his Tiger career at third base, but was shifted back to first base when the Tigers traded away first baseman Jason Thompson. Hebner was batting .291 with a team leading 82 RBIs when he strained instep ligaments in his right foot on August 22 against the Minnesota Twins. It limited him to eight at-bats over the rest of the 1980 season.

Hebner hit a game-winning three-run home run on opening day of the 1981 season. Soon afterwards, however, he would fall into the worst slump of his career. Following an RBI single in the second game of the season, Hebner would not collect another RBI for the rest of April. His batting average hovered below .200 for most of the first half of the season, inching just barely over the "Mendoza Line" (.206) when the players' strike came. His hitting improved slightly when play resumed (.253) to bring him to .226 with five home runs and 28 RBIs for the season.

With Enos Cabell's acquisition during spring training 1982, Hebner entered into a righty/lefty platoon with Cabell at first base. The system seemed to be working as both ended the month of May batting over .300, but he would still wind up on waivers on August 13 to make room for prospect Howard Johnson. Shortly afterwards, he returned to the Pirates for a player to be named later.

== Pirates and Cubs ==
Despite having never played the outfield in his professional career, Hebner was used in right field to fill in for an ailing Dave Parker. On September 14, Hebner and Bill Madlock both connected for grand slam home runs in the same game against the Chicago Cubs. It was the 31st time this occurred in major league history.

Hebner remained in a part-time role with the Pirates through the 1983 season, after which he signed with the Chicago Cubs as a free agent. Used primarily as a pinch hitter, and occasionally filling in at first and third, he played a valuable role for the team that reached the postseason for the first time since 1945. He returned to that role with the Cubs in 1985, and was among the league leaders in pinch hits before ending the season in a 0 for 22 slump. He still led the majors with twelve pinch-hit RBIs.

When his contract was up, the Montreal Expos sought Hebner, but he re-signed with the Cubs. Following a poor spring, he was released. Rather than try to catch on with the Expos or any other team, he retired.

== Coaching ==
Hebner was named manager of the Myrtle Beach Blue Jays in November 1987, and led the team to an 83-56 finish. He was named first-base coach of the Toronto Blue Jays but shortly after accepting the job, he moved over to the Boston Red Sox organization to replace Walt Hriniak as batting coach. He held that job through the 1991 season after which manager Joe Morgan and his entire coaching staff were fired.

He returned to the Toronto Blue Jays organization in November 1992 as minor-league hitting instructor. He was placed in an awkward position by the organization during the players' strike that canceled the end of the 1994 season. When the owners decided to go with replacement players the following spring, the Blue Jays determined that they would prefer that manager Cito Gaston and his major league staff not work with the strike-breakers. Instead, Hebner and fellow minor league coaches Bob Didier and Reggie Cleveland were given the task while Gaston worked with minor leaguers who would not be asked to break rank.

When the strike finally ended in March 1995, Hebner began coaching the triple A Syracuse Chiefs. He was promoted to manager of the club in June and remained at the helm through the 1996 season. He returned to the Pittsburgh Pirates in 1998 as the hitting coach for the triple A Nashville Sounds, and managed the Sounds for the second half of the 2000 season after former manager Trent Jewett was promoted to the major league coaching staff.

He returned to the major leagues as part of former teammate Larry Bowa's coaching staff on November 7, 2000, following Bowa's hiring as manager of the Phillies. He was fired after one season as their hitting coach despite increases in every offensive category in 2001. In January 2002, he was hired by the Tampa Bay Devil Rays as hitting coach for the triple A Durham Bulls of the International League. When he was fired at the end of the 2006 season, he jumped to the Chicago White Sox organization as hitting coach for the double A Birmingham Barons.

He spent just one season at Birmingham then was hired as manager of the Frederick Keys 49 games into the 2008 campaign on May 26, replacing Tommy Thompson who was granted a leave of absence for personal reasons. In the two seasons under Hebner's watch, the Keys went 35–55 (6–15/29–40) in 2008 and 64–75 (31–38/33–37) in 2009. He was named the hitting coach for the Norfolk Tides on January 7, 2010; he lasted one season in that capacity, as the Orioles declined to retain him on September 24.

Sporting positions
Preceded by Barry Foote	Myrtle Beach Blue Jays Manager; 1988	Succeeded by Mike Fischlin
Preceded by Walt Hriniak	Boston Red Sox Hitting Coach; 1989–1991	Succeeded by Rick Burleson
Preceded by Héctor Torres	Syracuse Chiefs manager 1995-2008	Succeeded by Garth Iorg
Preceded by Trent Jewett	Nashville Sounds manager 2000	Succeeded by Marty Brown
Preceded by Hal McRae	Philadelphia Phillies Hitting Coach; 2001	Succeeded by Greg Gross
Preceded by Tommy Thompson	Frederick Keys manager 2007-2008	Succeeded by Orlando Gómez
