= Nippon Blue Jays =

- Logo

Information
- League: Campeonato Brasileiro de Beisebol
- Location: Arujá, São Paulo, Brazil
- League championships: 12 (1993, 1995, 1997, 1999, 2000, 2001, 2002, 2003, 2008, 2010, 2011, 2018)
- Colors: Royal blue, navy blue, red, white
- Coach: Ricardo Kenji Matumaro

The Nippon Blue Jays are a baseball team that play in the Campeonato Brasileiro de Beisebol (CBB), the top division of baseball in Brazil. They are the most successful team in the tournament, with 12 championships since 1993. The team is owned by and based at the Nippon Country Club, a Japanese Brazilian country club in Arujá, São Paulo.

The team is not officially affiliated with the Toronto Blue Jays of Major League Baseball, but uses their logo and colors. This stems from José Pett, a Brazilian pitcher who signed with the MLB Blue Jays in 1993 as an international free agent; Pett's Brazilian club adopted the name “Blue Jays” in his honor, with the permission of the Toronto franchise. Toronto even donated authentic uniforms to the Brazilian club, upon Pett's request.

== Roster ==
Nippon Blue Jays roster – 2023 Campeonato Brasileiro de Beisebol
Players		Coaches
Pitchers: -- (Brazil) Gabriel de Souza; 39 (Brazil) Leo Haneda; -- (Brazil) Enrique Koyoma; 7 (Brazil) Seiji Kusakariba; 12 (Brazil) Claudio Matumoto Jr.; -- (Brazil) Daniel Missaki; 17 (Brazil) Caio Norimatsu; -- (Brazil) Eric Pardinho; -- (Brazil) Noah Ribeiro; -- (Brazil) Kenzo Sakita; 97 (Brazil) Kevin Sunahara; 10 (Brazil) Mauro Tanaka; -- (Brazil) Tomas Uemura	Catchers: 54 (Brazil) Gustavo Kitamura; 33 (Brazil) Salomon Koba; -- (Brazil) Gabriel Oshikawa; 45 (Brazil) Caio Tuni; Infielders: 99 (Brazil) Murilo de Lima; -- (Brazil) Vitor Furuya; 34 (Brazil) Felipe Kimura; 61 (Brazil) Matheus Lelis; 9 (Brazil) Erick Makita; 2 (Brazil) Lucas Oshikawa; -- (Brazil) Thiago Sakai; -- (Brazil) Pedro Sanches; -- (Brazil) Rafael Seriguti; 5 (Brazil) Ricardo Suzuki; 60 (Brazil) Danilo Uehara; 3 (Brazil) Rodrigo Uehara; Outfielders: 42 (Brazil) Caio Adaniya; 89 (Brazil) Lucas Ariki; -- (Brazil) Gabriel Asakura; -- (Brazil) João de Veque; 21 (Brazil) Niki Hayama; 22 (Brazil) Pedro Irikura; 4 (Brazil) Miguel Irikura; 1 (Brazil) Enzo Matumoto; -- (Brazil) Zander Okimasu; -- (Brazil) Fabio Yoshikawa; 48 (Brazil) Raphael Zanotti	Manager: (Brazil) Ricardo Matumaro; Roster updated on 19 April 2024

== See also ==
- List of Toronto Blue Jays minor league affiliates
