= Florence Flamingos =

Amateur baseball team in Florence, South Carolina, U.S.

- Logo

Information
- League: Coastal Plain League (West)
- Location: Florence, South Carolina
- Ballpark: Carolina Bank Field, 2022-present
- Founded: 1997 (Relocated 1998)
- Petitt Cup championships: 1997
- Former name(s): Florence RedWolves, 1998-2021; Raleigh RedWolves, 1997
- Former ballparks: Sparrow Stadium, 2012-2021; American Legion Field, 1998-2012; Doak Field, 1997
- Mascot: Flo
- Ownership: Thad Parsons
- Management: Mitchell Lister
- Coach: Eli Brum
- Website: www.florenceflamingos.com

The Florence Flamingos are an amateur baseball team that plays in Florence, South Carolina. The Flamingos are part of the Coastal Plain League, the collegiate summer baseball league located in the American Southeast.

== History ==
The then Raleigh RedWolves were founded in 1997, winning the Petitt Cup title that year. Before the 1998 season the RedWolves relocated to American Legion Field in Florence. The team was purchased in 2001 by Kevin M. Barth, a local Florence attorney, and his wife. The RedWolves were named Coastal Plain League 2004 "Organization of the Year" and made the playoffs every year from 2001 through 2006. The RedWolves were first half champions in 2003, losing the championship to the Outer Banks Daredevils. In 2014, Florence won both the first and second half West Division titles before losing in the Petitt Cup 2 games to 1. Since their championship in 1997 the RedWolves have been to four more Petitt Cup Championship games losing all four.

The RedWolves moved to Francis Marion University's Sparrow Stadium during the 2012 season. They hosted the Coastal Plain League All-Star Game there on July 12, 2015.

In October 2020, the Barths sold a controlling interest to SRO Partners, while retaining a minority stake in the team. In May 2021, the team invited fans to suggest a new team name to go along with their plans to move in 2022 to the new Carolina Bank Field to be built in Florence. The new name, Florence Flamingos, as well as the new logo and uniforms, were revealed July 31, 2021, at the last game of the season and went into immediate use. The Flamingos played the first game at Carolina Bank Field on May 28, 2022.

For the 2024 season, the Flamingos moved from the CPL's East Division to the West Division. Washington, DC-area entrepreneur Thad Parsons purchased the Flamingos in early 2024.

== Location ==
The Flamingos play their home game at Carolina Bank Field in Florence.
