= Alice R. Ballard =

American ceramicist (born 1945)

- Born: June 16, 1945 (age 80); Florence, South Carolina, U.S.
- Other names: Alice Ballard Munn
- Education: University of Michigan (BS, MFA)
- Occupations: Ceramicist, educator
- Website: aliceballard.com

Alice R. Ballard, also known as Alice Ballard Munn, (born June 16, 1945) is an American ceramicist, based in Clover, South Carolina.

== Life and career ==
Alice R. Ballard was born on June 16, 1945, in Florence, South Carolina. She received a BS degree in design, and MFA degree in 1968 in painting from the University of Michigan.

It is evident that her background in painting comes heavily into play during surface decoration with her ceramics. Ballard uses the pods as a three-dimensional canvas using terra sigallata because it reminds her much more of paint. Whereas glaze really sits on top like icing on the cake, she really wanted to emphasize the cake.

From 1974 to 2001, she attended numerous workshops from the Penland School of Craft in Penland, North Carolina. In 2004 she took a 40-day trip to China sponsored by the Center for International Research in Ceramic Art, West Virginia University. She has been a ceramic instructor on and off since 1967, and has her work in several galleries, including the Blue Spiral Gallery in Asheville, North Carolina and the Smithsonian American Art Museum’s Renwick Gallery in Washington D.C., where a white earthenware terra sigillata piece entitled "White Onion VII", has been added to the permanent collection.

Much of her work is characterized by the organic earthenware forms of closed containers, pinch pots, platters, pods, teapots, totems, small work, vessels and a series she refers to as her white work. Much of her work is finished with terra sigillata. Alice considers her art to be “a reflection of [her] relationship with natural forms. It is often the metamorphosis of Nature's forms, as they change from season to season, that attracts her to that universal world in which differing life forms share similar qualities." Her aesthetic heavily references the mother/child/germination metaphor and also explores the more evocative realm of wonder and awe.

Ballard is known for her work with nature she has done much with bulbs, plants and seed pods that she collects on walks in her neighbourhood. One notable walk for Alice was "In the fall of 2005 while visiting Highwaterclays in Asheville, North Carolina, her husband Roger and her stopped to walk their 2 dogs along the railroad tracks, near the river. On this walk she noticed a tree that had obviously sprung up from some wild seed, flung by a pod to a destination unknown. On this tree were clusters of little empty brown pods that looked like two little dimensional heart shapes that were open at one end and attached at the other. She snapped off two or three clusters and took them home to her studio in Greenville, South Carolina. There they joined the company of many other forms collected on walks. [She] loved these forms, shared them with others as she often does when she is teaching but did nothing but admire these special forms for several years. A call to the Clemson Botanical Gardens about this tree revealed that it was in fact a Royal Paulownia Tree (Paulownia tomentosa), an invasive tree that made its way from its native habitat in China. All this time, she was bonding with these little pod forms as her ideas for future forms to be made in clay percolated. The Wall Pod series eventually became the result of this lengthy but rich process."

== Exhibitions ==
- 2006 Faculty Show, Governors School for the Art, Greenville, South Carolina
- 2006 Second International, Small Teapot Show, Saddleback College, Mission Viejo, California
- 2002 "San Angelo National Ceramics Competition", San Angelo Museum of Fine Arts, San Angelo, Texas
- 2001 "Spotlight 2001", Arrowmont School of Arts and Crafts, Gatlinburg, Tennessee
- 2000 "Border Biennial for North Carolina and South Carolina", Museum of York County, Rock Hill, South Carolina
- 1996 "Alaska Juried Clay" Bunnel St. Gallery, Homer, Alaska
- 1995 "Earth, Fire & Fiber XX, " Anchorage Museum, Anchorage, Alaska
- 1984 North Carolina Artists "Exhibition 84", North Carolina Museum of Art, Raleigh, North Carolina
- "Northern Telecom 3rd Annual Sculpture Exhibition", Raleigh, North Carolina

== Permanent collections ==
Her work is in the permanent collections of:

- Renwick Gallery of the Smithsonian American Art Museum, Washington, D.C.
- Mint Museum of Art, Charlotte, North Carolina
- Resen Ceramic Colony, Resen, North Macedonia
- Greenville County Museum of Art, Greenville, South Carolina
- Tennessee State Art Collection, Nashville, Tennessee
- South Carolina State Art Collection, Columbia, South Carolina
- NCNB National Bank, Charlotte, North Carolina
