= Daniel Missaki =

Brazilian baseball player (born 1996)

Free agent
- Pitcher
- Born: April 9, 1996 (age 30); Fujinomiya, Shizuoka, Japan
- Bats: Right Throws: Right
- Stats at Baseball Reference
Medals
Men's baseball
Representing Brazil
Pan American Games
Silver medal – second place	2023 Santiago	Team

Daniel Ryuske Missaki (born April 9, 1996) is a Brazilian professional baseball pitcher who is a free agent.

== Career ==
=== Seattle Mariners ===
Missaki represented Brazil at the 2013 World Baseball Classic, and was the youngest player in the tournament, at just 16 years old. Following the tournament, on June 19, 2013, Missaki signed as an international free agent with the Seattle Mariners.

After signing with Seattle, Missaki made his professional debut that season with the Arizona League Mariners, going 0–1 with a 6.23 ERA in 13 innings pitched. In 2014, he played with the Pulaski Mariners where he pitched to a 6-3 record and a 2.76 ERA in 11 starts, and in 2015, Missaki pitched for the Clinton LumberKings. On May 1, 2015, Missaki and two relievers combined on a no-hitter for the LumberKings against the Cedar Rapids Kernels. Later that month, he underwent Tommy John surgery that ended his season. In six starts prior to the surgery, he was 1-2 with a 3.41 ERA.

=== Milwaukee Brewers ===
Following the 2015 season, the Mariners traded Missaki, Carlos Herrera, and Freddy Peralta to the Milwaukee Brewers for Adam Lind. He missed both the 2016 and 2017 seasons after having another Tommy John surgery. In 2018, despite making a couple of appearances in spring training, Missaki did not pitch in a regular season game. He was released from the Brewers organization on September 18, 2018.

=== Tochigi Golden Braves ===
Missaki signed with the Tochigi Golden Braves of Baseball Challenge League on April 10, 2020.

=== Yomiuri Giants ===
On August 17, 2021, Missaki signed with the Yomiuri Giants of the Nippon Professional Baseball (NPB) as a developmental squad player for forty thousand dollars.

Missaki made 8 appearances for Yomiuri's farm team, pitching to a 2.45 ERA in 2022, but did not appear for the main club. He became a free agent following the 2022 season.

=== Return to Latin America ===
In 2023, Missaki played with the Centauros de La Guaira, a team in the newly created, summer-time Venezuelan Major League. Missaki also returned to Brazil and played for his hometown Nippon Blue Jays in the Brazilian league, awaiting new professional opportunities.

=== Caimanes de Barranquilla ===
Missaki signed with the Caimanes de Barranquilla of the Colombian Professional Baseball League for the 2023–24 season. In nine regular season appearances, he worked to a 1.26 ERA with 42 strikeouts over 35 2/3 innings pitched. He won two games in the final series against Vaqueros de Montería, including a complete-game shutout in the final, championship-winning game. Missaki was named MVP of both the regular season and the final series.

=== Diablos Rojos del México ===
On January 16, 2024, Missaki signed with the Diablos Rojos del México of the Mexican League. He pitched against the New York Yankees in a spring training game at Estadio Alfredo Harp Helú on March 25th, loading the bases but managing to work himself out of the inning without conceding a run. In five total appearances with the Diablos, he posted a 2–0 record with a 1.50 ERA and 10 strikeouts over 6 innings pitched.

=== Chicago Cubs ===
On April 24, 2024, Missaki signed a minor league contract with the Chicago Cubs. In 20 appearances split between the rookie-level Arizona Complex League Cubs, Double-A Tennessee Smokies, and Triple-A Iowa Cubs, he accumulated a 4.68 ERA with 44 strikeouts across 32 2/3 innings pitched. Missaki elected free agency following the season on November 4.

=== Texas Rangers ===
On January 6, 2025, Missaki signed a minor league contract with the Texas Rangers. On March 18, 2026, he was placed on the full-season injured list ending his season before it began. He elected free agency on November 2.

== International career ==
Missaki was selected for Brazil national baseball team at the 2013 World Baseball Classic Qualification, 2013 World Baseball Classic, and the 2019 Pan American Games Qualifier. At the 2013 WBC qualifiers, where Brazil earned its first ever World Baseball Classic berth, Missaki pitched 0.2 innings of scoreless relief. At the 2013 tournament, he pitched 0.1 innings of scoreless relief. He was named to the Brazilian national team roster for the 2021 World Baseball Classic Qualifier, before it was cancelled due to the COVID-19 pandemic.

Missaki was part of the Brazilian squad that won the silver medal at the 2023 Pan American Games contested in Santiago, Chile in October 2023.
