= Dennis Holmberg =

American baseball player and manager

Toronto Blue Jays
- Manager / Third baseman / Outfielder
- Born: August 2, 1951 (age 75); Fremont, Nebraska, U.S.
- Bats: Left Throws: Right
- Stats at Baseball Reference

Dennis Nels Holmberg (born August 2, 1951) is an American minor league baseball manager for the Bluefield Blue Jays, and was a professional baseball player for eight seasons in the minor leagues.

Holmberg attended Brewton-Parker College and was chosen by the Montreal Expos in the 58th round of the 1969 amateur draft, but he declined to sign with them. The next year he was drafted in the 5th round by the Milwaukee Brewers, and he played eight seasons in their farm system. He began his professional career with the 1970 Newark Co-Pilots, splitting his time between third base and the outfield. In 1971, he was a part-time third baseman with the Danville Warriors. Holmberg spent the 1972 campaign with the San Antonio Brewers. In 1973, Dennis split his time between Danville and Shreveport.

In 1974 Holmberg was back in Danville. Playing for Burlington in 1975, Holmberg did well at the plate but poorly in the field having thirty-eight errors at third base. In 1976, Holmberg played for Burlington again, and he rounded out his playing career with sixteen games in Holyoke in 1977.

After his playing career ended, he became a longtime member of the Toronto Blue Jays organization. Holmberg began his managerial career in the Brewers chain with the Newark Co-Pilots in 1977. He moved to the Blue Jays chain with the Medicine Hat Blue Jays in 1979. He jumped to the Kinston Eagles in 1980, then managed the Florence Blue Jays from 1981 to 1984. In 1986 he returned to Medicine Hat for one year. Holmberg managed the Dunedin Blue Jays from 1990 to 1993. In 1994 and 1995, Holmberg was the bullpen coach for the Toronto Blue Jays. He returned to Dunedin in 1996 and 1997.

From 2002 to 2010, he managed the Auburn Doubledays of the New York–Penn League, leading the team to the best record in the league in 2003 and 2004. In 2011, he began managing the Bluefield Blue Jays of the Appalachian League. He was named Appalachian League Manager of the Year for 2011. Holmberg was announced as the manager for the fourth consecutive season on June 13, 2014, giving him a total of 36 years with the Blue Jays organization.

Dennis Holmberg has won Minor League Baseball‘s 10th annual Mike Coolbaugh Award.

Holmberg will receive the award at the Baseball Winter Meetings Banquet on Sunday, December 10, at the Walt Disney World Swan and Dolphin Resort in Orlando, Florida.

The Mike Coolbaugh Award is presented annually to an individual who has shown outstanding baseball work ethic, knowledge of the game and skill in mentoring young players on the field.

On June 14, 2018, it was announced that Holmberg would be inducted into the Florida State League Hall of Fame on November 13.
