= Carolina Bank Field =

American sports venue

- Location within South Carolina Location within the United States
- Interactive map of Carolina Bank Field
- Address: 1200 Jennie O'Bryan Ave. Florence, SC 29501
- Coordinates: 34°12′49″N 79°47′03″W
- Owner: City of Florence
- Operator: Florence Flamingos
- Capacity: 1,408 seats

Construction
- Groundbreaking: March 22, 2021
- Opened: May 28, 2022
- Cost: $5 million

Tenant
- Florence Flamingos (CPL) 2022–

Carolina Bank Field is a baseball stadium in Florence, South Carolina. The ballpark is home field for the Florence Flamingos, a collegiate summer baseball team in the Coastal Plain League. It is part of the Florence Sports Complex. The ballpark opened on Saturday, May 28, 2022.

In September 2020, the then-named Florence RedWolves signed a ten-year stadium lease with two five-year lease options. In April 2021, the RedWolves and Carolina Bank jointly announced a 10-year naming rights agreement. In July 2021, the RedWolves changed their name to the Flamingos.
