= Jim Eppard =

American baseball player (born 1960)

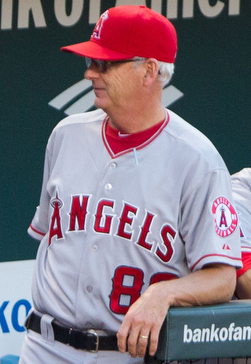
- Eppard with the Angels in 2012
- Outfielder
- Born: April 27, 1960 (age 65); South Bend, Indiana, U.S.
- Batted: Left Threw: Left

MLB debut
- September 8, 1987, for the California Angels

Last MLB appearance
- October 1, 1990, for the Toronto Blue Jays

MLB statistics
- Batting average: .281
- Home runs: 0
- Runs batted in: 16
- Stats at Baseball Reference

Teams
- California Angels (1987–1989); Toronto Blue Jays (1990)

James Gerhard Eppard (born April 27, 1960) is an American former Major League Baseball outfielder and first baseman.

== Career ==
Drafted by the Oakland Athletics in the 13th round of the 1982 MLB amateur draft, Eppard made his Major League debut with the California Angels on September 8, 1987, and appeared in his final game on October 1, 1990.

Eppard became the Angels hitting coach in May 2012. On October 8, 2013, he was fired by the Angels.
