= Tom Gilles =

American baseball player (born 1962)

- Pitcher
- Born: July 2, 1962 (age 64); Peoria, Illinois, U.S.
- Batted: Right Threw: Right

MLB debut
- June 7, 1990, for the Toronto Blue Jays

Last MLB appearance
- June 8, 1990, for the Toronto Blue Jays

MLB statistics
- Win–loss record: 1–0
- Earned run average: 6.75
- Strikeouts: 1
- Stats at Baseball Reference

Teams
- Toronto Blue Jays (1990)

Thomas Bradford Gilles (born July 2, 1962) is an American former professional baseball pitcher. Gilles pitched in two games for the Toronto Blue Jays of Major League Baseball (MLB) in the 1990 season.

Born in Peoria, Illinois, Gilles was drafted by the New York Yankees in the 47th round of the 1984 amateur draft.
