= Myrtle Beach Blue Jays =

- 1987–1992; Myrtle Beach, SC

Minor league affiliations
- Class: Class A (1987–1992)
- League: South Atlantic League (1987–1992)

Major league affiliations
- Team: Toronto Blue Jays (1987-1992)

Minor league titles
- League titles: 1987; 1992
- Division titles: 1987; 1992

Team data
- Name: Myrtle Beach Hurricanes (1991-1992); Myrtle Beach Blue Jays (1987-1990)
- Ballpark: Charles Watson Stadium (1987–1992)

The Myrtle Beach Blue Jays were a minor league baseball team based in Myrtle Beach, South Carolina. They began play in the South Atlantic League in 1987 after being relocated from Florence, South Carolina (Florence Blue Jays). They played at the 3,500 seat Charles Watson Stadium and were a minor league club of the Toronto Blue Jays. During this time, they would see players such as Carlos Delgado, Steve Karsay, Derek Bell, Pat Hentgen, and Chris Weinke wear their uniform. The club was renamed the Myrtle Beach Hurricanes in 1991. The team was sold after the 1992 season and relocated to Maryland as the Hagerstown Suns (replacing an Eastern League franchise of the same name).

== Season-by-season record ==
Season	Class	League	Division	Affiliation	Manager	Record	Finish	Attendance	Postseason
1987	A	South Atlantic	South	Toronto	Barry Foote	83-56	1st	74,179	Defeated Asheville 3—2 in league championship
1988	A	South Atlantic	South	Toronto	Richie Hebner	83-56	2nd	78,212	Lost to Charleston in South Division championship 2-1
1989	A	South Atlantic	South	Toronto	Mike Fischlin	73-68	6th	68,779	-
1990	A	South Atlantic	South	Toronto	Mike Fischlin	77-63	2nd	71,598	-
1991	A	South Atlantic	South	Toronto	Garth Iorg	60-79	7th	62,885	-
1992	A	South Atlantic	South	Toronto	Doug Ault	71-65	2nd	61,120	Defeated Columbus 2-0 in South Division championship Defeated Charleston 3-0 in league championship

== Notable alumni ==
- Derek Bell (1988)
- Carlos Delgado (1991) 2 x MLB All-Star
- Junior Felix (1987)
- Barry Foote (1987, MGR)
- Alex Gonzalez (1991)
- Richie Hebner (1988, MGR)
- Pat Hentgen (1987) 3 x MLB All-Star; 1996 AL Cy Young Award
- Garth Iorg (1991, MGR)
- Steve Karsay (1991)
- Graeme Lloyd (1988-1990)
- Luis Sojo (1987-1988)
- Chris Stynes (1992)
- Mike Timlin (1988)
- David Weathers (1989)
- Chris Weinke (1992) Heisman Trophy Award winner, 2000
- Mark Whiten (1987)

== Seasons synopsis ==
=== 1987 Season ===
The team had a great first season in the South Atlantic League, winning the South Division in both the first half (42-28) and second half (41-28) under manager Barry Foote. The team led the league in ERA (3.13) and was third in runs (660) but the Asheville Tourists had an even better record (91-48) and scoring differential, leaving the Blue Jays as underdogs for the league championship. Myrtle Beach won game one 3-2 at home, then lost 9-2 before going on the road for the last three games. They lost 7-6 but then won 6-5 to stay alive with 4 runs in the ninth. The finale was a 3-2 win for the Jays, who had won a title in their first season in their new home. Mark Whiten was voted the top prospect in the league by league managers. Junior Felix was selected as the number three prospect. Catcher Francisco Cabrera was selected as the ninth-best prospect. Shortstop Eric Yelding stole 73 bases. Utility infielder Luis Sojo and backup catcher Randy Knorr would go on to long big-league careers. All Star Doug Linton led the league in earned run average and was selected as the sixth best prospect in addition to being the Most Outstanding Pitcher. The pitching staff also included Pat Hentgen and Cesar Mejia among the earned run leaders in the league.

=== 1988 Season ===
The 1988 edition of the team also won the first half (46-24) but slipped in the second half (37-32) and then fell in the playoffs. The team had five of the league's 12 All-Stars, in addition to manager Richie Hebner. Derek Bell was voted the top prospect in the league. Jimmy Rogers was selected as Most Outstanding Pitcher and was named the fifth best prospect. First baseman Greg Vella (fourth best) and pitcher Xavier Hernandez (tenth best) were also top prospects. Rob MacDonald and Steve Wapnick were an excellent lefty-righty combination out of the bullpen.

=== 1989 Season ===
In 1989 Myrtle Beach fell drastically, going 59-83 for the worst record in the South Atlantic League (12th overall). Mike Fischlin was the new manager. The club's 4.07 ERA was second-worst in the league. Dave Weathers (11-13, 3.86) was the workhorse of the staff that year.

=== 1990 Season ===
Fischlin's club did better in 1990, posting a 77-63 record, fourth in the league despite no All-Stars. The team earned run average improved to third place (3.12), with Rob Blumberg (2.16) fourth in the league, Mike Ogliaruso (2.52) fifth (and named the number 8 prospect) and Aaron Small (2.80) eighth. Outfielder Nigel Wilson was perhaps the club's most potent offensive force.

=== 1991 Season ===
In 1991 the Myrtle Beach Blue Jays changed their name to the Myrtle Beach Hurricanes, remaining a Toronto Blue Jays affiliate. In their first year as the Hurricanes they went 60-79, 12th in the 14-team South Atlantic League under manager Garth Iorg. The team had the number three prospect in the league according to a poll of managers, catcher Carlos Delgado. Future NBA player Scott Burrell was 1-0 with a 2.00 ERA in 5 starts, striking out 31 in 27 innings and allowing just 18 hits. Ricardo Jordan also had a good year on the mound for the team.

=== 1992 ===
The team began 5-22 but finished the first half 27-15 and had the best second-half record (39-28). They then won all five postseason matches to capture the league title. Outfielder Rick Holifield hit .199 in the regular season but .444 in the postseason. The team had a couple of top prospects playing the field - first baseman Chris Weinke and shortstop Alex Gonzalez (number nine prospect in the league as per managers). Additionally third baseman Chris Stynes and utility infielder Joe Lis Jr. were key offensive contributors. Pitcher Paul Spoljaric was voted the number three prospect in the circuit. Giovanni Carrara (11-7, 3.14) was a good third starter behind All-Star Spoljaric and league earned run leader Travis Baptist. Gregg Martin and Al Montoya were a fine closing duo.

== Move to Hagerstown ==
The club was owned by Baltimore oxygen salesman Winston Blenckstone, who had purchased the Florence Blue Jays for $200,000 in October, 1986 moving the club to Myrtle Beach. The Blue Jays home debut on April 8, 1987 against the Savannah Cardinals drew a standing room-only crowd of 4,030, but attendance quickly settled in at less than a thousand a night. Myrtle Beach’s attendance was among the worst in the South Atlantic League, just as it had been in Florence previously.

By April 1989, Blenckstone was frustrated and threatened to move his ball club if city leaders wouldn’t commit to a new two million dollar stadium. He re-branded the team as the Myrtle Beach Hurricanes in 1991, but that did nothing to change the club’s box office fortunes. In late 1992, with stadium negotiations going nowhere, Blenckstone moved the franchise to Hagerstown, Maryland, and renamed the team the Hagerstown Suns.

== South Atlantic League All-Stars ==
- Second Base: William Suero (1988)
- Shortstop: Luis Sojo (1988)
- Utility Infielder: Howard Battle (1991)
- Outfield: Junior Felix (1987), Mark Whiten (1987), Derek Bell (1988)
- Pitcher: Doug Linton (1987), Jimmy Rogers (1988), Denis Boucher (1988), Paul Spoljaric (1992), Chris Kotes (1992)
- Manager: Richie Hebner (1988)

== South Atlantic League Season Leaders ==
=== Pitching ===
- Earned Run Average: 1.55, Doug Linton (1987); 1.44, Travis Baptist (1992)
- Wins: 18, Jimmy Rogers (1988)
- Strikeouts: 198, Jimmy Rogers (1988)
- Winning Percentage: .818 (18-4), Jimmy Rogers (1988)
- Runs allowed: 103, Tim Brown (1989)

=== Hitting ===
- Batting Average: .344, Derek Bell (1988)
- Hits: 155, Luis Sojo (1988)
- Runs: 94, Mark Young (1989)
