= Frank Wills (baseball) =

American baseball player (1958–2012)

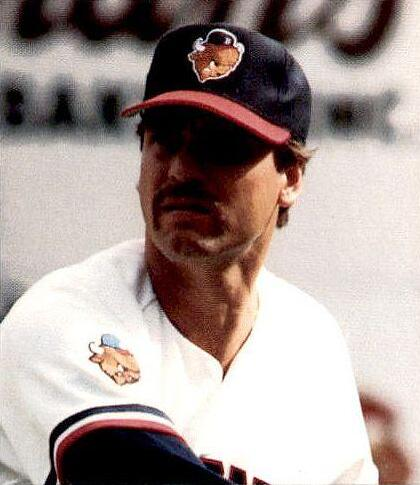
- Wills with the Buffalo Bisons c. 1987
- Pitcher
- Born: October 26, 1958; New Orleans, Louisiana, U.S.
- Died: May 11, 2012 (aged 53); New Orleans, Louisiana, U.S.
- Batted: Right Threw: Right

MLB debut
- July 31, 1983, for the Kansas City Royals

Last MLB appearance
- April 30, 1991, for the Toronto Blue Jays

MLB statistics
- Win–loss record: 22–26
- Earned run average: 5.06
- Strikeouts: 281
- Stats at Baseball Reference

Teams
- Kansas City Royals (1983–1984); Seattle Mariners (1985); Cleveland Indians (1986–1987); Toronto Blue Jays (1988–1991)

Frank Lee Wills, Jr. (October 26, 1958 – May 11, 2012) was an American relief pitcher in Major League Baseball for the Kansas City Royals (1983–84), Seattle Mariners (1985), Cleveland Indians (1986–87), and Toronto Blue Jays (1988–91). Wills was an All-American pitcher for Tulane University, where he also was a punter for the Tulane Green Wave football team.

== Playing career ==
Wills grew up in Uptown, New Orleans, where he played baseball. He attended De La Salle High School, where he also played football and basketball. He then attended Tulane. He was the football team's punter for three seasons while pitching on the baseball team. In 1980, he went 5–3 with a 2.81 earned run average in 18 games and was named an All-American by Baseball America and the American Baseball Coaches Association.

The Royals drafted Wills in the first round with the 16th overall selection in the 1980 MLB draft. He converted to a reliever role in 1982. He made his MLB debut the following July, splitting 1983 and 1984 between Kansas City and Triple-A.

In January 1986, the Royals traded Wills to the New York Mets as part of a four-team trade sending Jim Sundberg to the Royals and Tim Leary to the Milwaukee Brewers. However, the Mets traded Wills to the Mariners at the end of March for minor leaguer Wray Bergendahl. Wills threw the first no-hitter in Calgary Cannons history on May 31, in a seven-inning game, before being promoted to the Mariners. He became a free agent after the season and signed with Cleveland.

Wills signed with Toronto on January 12, 1989. On September 30, he threw four scoreless innings to earn a win as the Blue Jays clinched the American League East division title. He pitched in a career-high 44 MLB games in 1990.

== Personal life ==
After his playing career, Wills worked for a limousine company in New Orleans. He died on May 11, 2012. Wills was married and had two children.

Wills was inducted into the New Orleans Sports Hall of Fame in 2022. Before his death, he was inducted into the De La Salle High School Hall of Fame, Tulane Hall of Fame, and the New Orleans Professional Baseball Hall of Fame.
