= American Legion Field (Florence) =

Baseball venue in South Carolina

- Location within South Carolina Location within the United States
- Interactive map of American Legion Field
- Address: Florence, South Carolina
- Coordinates: 34.194406°N 79.713396°W
- Capacity: 3,500
- Field size: Left field: 305 ft (93 m); Center field: 385 ft (117 m); Right field: 305 ft (93 m)

Construction
- Opened: 1968

Tenants
- Florence Blue Jays (SAL) 1981-1986; Florence Flame (ACL) 1995; Florence RedWolves (CPL) 1998-2012; Florence–Darlington Tech Stingers 2004-2012; Florence Legion Post 1

American Legion Field is a baseball venue in Florence, South Carolina, United States. The venue was built in 1968 and has a capacity of 3,500. The field's dimensions are 305 ft. down the foul lines, 335 ft. to the gaps, and 385 ft. to dead center field.

== Former tenants ==
Between 1981 and 1986, the park was home to the Florence Blue Jays of the South Atlantic League. The park hosted the Florence Flame of the now defunct Atlantic Coast League for one season in 1995.

It was the home of the Florence RedWolves of the Coastal Plain League, a collegiate summer baseball league. The RedWolves played at the field from 1998 to 2012, before moving to nearby Francis Marion University's Sparrow Stadium during the 2012 season. American Legion Field no longer met Coastal Plain League standards, lacking a visitors clubhouse and having questionable field conditions.

This was also home to the Florence–Darlington Tech (JUCO) Stingers baseball team from 2004 to 2012 before they moved to Francis Marion University, splitting home games between old Cormell Field and Sparrow Stadium.
