= Dominican Summer League Blue Jays =

- Boca Chica

Minor league affiliations
- Class: Rookie
- League: Dominican Summer League
- Division: Boca Chica Baseball City Los Rieles

Major league affiliations
- Team: Toronto Blue Jays

Minor league titles
- League titles (2): 1991, 2021

Team data
- Name: Blue Jays
- Ballpark: Baseball City Complex
- Owner/ Operator: Toronto Blue Jays
- Manager: Danny Canellas

The Dominican Summer Blue Jays are a baseball team in the Dominican Summer League. The DSL is a rookie level circuit, and therefore the team is a rookie affiliate. The team plays in the San Pedro de Macorís division.

== Facilities ==
The team plays at Boca Chica Baseball City Complex along with Dominican Summer League Diamondbacks, Dominican Summer League Orioles, Dominican Summer League White Sox and Dominican Summer League Reds. The facility opened in 2004 and has 10 full baseball diamonds and two smaller diamonds. The facility is located 2.2 kilometres (1.4 mi) northwest of Boca Chica on Los Rieles just off of Autopista Las Americas.

== Championships ==
DSL Blue Jays were league champions during the 1991 season. In 1992, the team went 68–2 during the regular season—including a 37 game winning streak to start the season—for a winning percentage of .971; however, the team lost in the first round of the postseason. In 2021, when there was no postseason, the team had the league's best winning percentage for the regular season, at 38–19 (.667).

== Roster ==
Dominican Summer League Blue Jays Blue roster
Players	Coaches/Other
Pitchers: 23 Jose Andrades; 19 Enmanuel Araujo; 21 Roberto Castellanos; 16 Sahir De La Cruz; 28 Enyer Dominguez; 13 Evington Gascon; 8 Elian Guzman; 25 David Hernandez; 41 Celwin Hurkmans; 18 Tomoya Kinjo; 23 Orlando Marcelin; 20 Danny Martinez; 6 Ire Martinez; 29 Yoenis Morales; 36 Kenyer Navarro; 45 Manuel Parra; 31 Sebastian Rodriguez; 26 Wagner Soto; 58 Marcelino Theodore; 39 Yancarlos Vasquez; -- Angel Ynfante; Catchers: 14 Juan Caricote; 3 Samuel Orellana; 17 Randy Soto; 2 Isay Veras; Infielders: 10 J.T. Bain; 4 Sebastian Casanova; 5 Yariel Cordero; 24 Eiker Lothar; 1 Cristopher Polanco; 9 Ruben Sanchez; Outfielders: 11 Daniel Dominguez; 27 Luis Felipe; 30 Deret Gonzalez; 7 Michael Mesa	Manager: 7 Ashley Ponce; Coaches: 14 Jose Ferrer (bench); 34 Ramon Marte (assistant pitching); 47 Jose Mateo (coach); 27 Ricardo Nanita (hitting); 49 Victor Ramos (pitching); 60-day injured list: 30 Gabriel Brito; -- Nicolas Vergara; 7-day injured list; * On Toronto Blue Jays 40-man roster; ~ Development list; # Rehab assignment; ∞ Reserve list; ‡ Restricted list; § Suspended list; † Temporarily inactive list; Roster updated June 13, 2026; Transactions; → More rosters: MiLB • Dominican Summer League; → Toronto Blue Jays minor league players

Dominican Summer League Blue Jays Red roster
Players	Coaches/Other
Pitchers: 47 Bryan Borbon; 29 Cesar Cerezo; 21 Daniel De La Cruz; 30 Abrahan Diaz; 35 Cristhian Duarte; 34 Fayon Dumorne; 25 Cristhian Espinosa; 3 Victor Espiritu; 20 Alexander Garcia; 66 Jorge Gonzalez; 26 Jose Melo; 11 Adrian Moreta; 28 Carlos Olivo; 39 Carlos Pena; 32 Raduan Perez; 12 Juan Ramirez; 32 Rodrigo Ramirez; 19 Franiel Severino; 51 Alieski Torres; 22 Jarlin Ugarte; Catchers: 6 Diego Arce; 38 Jose Gori; 18 Ayberson Ortega; Infielders: 10 Elaineiker Coronado; 17 Frelian Flores; 5 Alex Linares; 4 Darwin Nuñez; 1 Gabriel Porras; 2 Juarlin Soto; Outfielders: 9 Fabian Gonzalez; 15 Luis Nunez; 36 Elian Reyes; 27 Aneudi Severino	Manager: 13 Deiferson Barreto; Coaches: 14 Brandon Gonzalez (bench); 16 Reed Lavallee (coach); 50 Rafael Monsion (pitching); 37 Juan Nunez (assistant pitching); 40 Mark Ossanna (hitting); 60-day injured list: 23 Gabriel Brito; 7-day injured list; * On Toronto Blue Jays 40-man roster; ~ Development list; # Rehab assignment; ∞ Reserve list; ‡ Restricted list; § Suspended list; † Temporarily inactive list; Roster updated June 13, 2026; Transactions; → More rosters: MiLB • Dominican Summer League; → Toronto Blue Jays minor league players

== Results by season ==
2006

In 2006, the Blue Jays' one DSL team finished with a record of 44–29.

2007

In 2007, two teams were fielded, designated Blue Jays 1 and Blue Jays 2. Blue Jays 1 finished with a record of 35–33.

2008

In 2008, two teams were again fielded, playing in the Boca Chica South division. They played 72 games between the end of May until mid to late August with playoffs beginning at the end of August. The DSL All Star game held on July 27 included Blue Jay prospects catcher Carlos Pérez and infielder Oliver Dominguez. Blue Jays 1 ended with a record of 35–33, finishing 4th in the group and 13 games behind the DSL Giants who were division champions.

2009

In 2009, the Blue Jays had one team, competing in the Boca Chica North Division, which finished the season at 43–26 and in fourth place, eight games behind the DSL Giants who again won the division.

2010

In 2010, the team moved into the San Pedro Division.
