= Mike Fischlin =

American baseball player (born 1955)

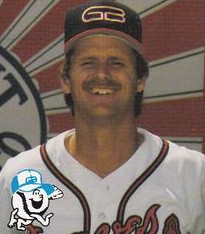
- Fischlin in 1988
- Shortstop / Second baseman
- Born: September 13, 1955 (age 70); Sacramento, California, U.S.
- Batted: Right Threw: Right

MLB debut
- September 3, 1977, for the Houston Astros

Last MLB appearance
- May 11, 1987, for the Atlanta Braves

MLB statistics
- Batting average: .220
- Home runs: 3
- Runs batted in: 68
- Stats at Baseball Reference

Teams
- Houston Astros (1977–1978, 1980); Cleveland Indians (1981–1985); New York Yankees (1986); Atlanta Braves (1987)

Michael Thomas Fischlin (born September 13, 1955) is an American former professional baseball player. He played all or part of ten seasons in Major League Baseball between 1977 and 1987 for the Houston Astros (1977–78, 1980), Cleveland Indians (1981–85), New York Yankees (1986) and Atlanta Braves (1987), primarily as a backup shortstop and second baseman.

== Career ==
Fischlin was originally drafted by the New York Yankees in the 1975 Major League Baseball draft, and played for two years in their farm system. On June 15, 1977, he was traded with Randy Niemann and Dave Bergman for Cliff Johnson.

Fischlin played one game for the Houston Astros' 1980 National League West champion team. In a 10-season career, he was a .220 hitter (207-for-941) with three home runs and 68 RBI in 517 games, including 109 runs, 29 doubles, six triples, and 24 stolen bases.

He also spent nine seasons in the minor leagues spanning 1975–1988 and managed the Myrtle Beach Blue Jays of the South Atlantic League in the 1989 and 1990 seasons. He played from 1977 through 1980 with the Cardenales de Lara and Leones del Caracas of the Venezuelan Winter League.

Fischlin was, along with Bill Caudill, one of the first players represented by agent Scott Boras. He currently works for Boras as the Minister of Culture and President of 0-2 Team.
