= Nelson Liriano =

Dominican baseball player (born 1964)

- Second baseman
- Born: June 3, 1964 (age 61); Puerto Plata, Dominican Republic
- Batted: Switch Threw: Right

Professional debut
- MLB: August 25, 1987, for the Toronto Blue Jays
- NPB: July 21, 1999, for the Chunichi Dragons

Last appearance
- MLB: May 13, 1998, for the Colorado Rockies
- NPB: July 21, 1999, for the Chunichi Dragons

MLB statistics
- Batting average: .260
- Home runs: 25
- Runs batted in: 240

NPB statistics
- Batting average: .000
- Home runs: 0
- Runs batted in: 0
- Stats at Baseball Reference

Teams
- Toronto Blue Jays (1987–1990); Minnesota Twins (1990); Kansas City Royals (1991); Colorado Rockies (1993–1994); Pittsburgh Pirates (1995–1996); Los Angeles Dodgers (1997); Colorado Rockies (1998); Chunichi Dragons (1999)

Nelson Arturo Liriano Bonilla (born June 3, 1964) is a Dominican former professional baseball second baseman. He played in Major League Baseball from 1987 through 1998 for the Toronto Blue Jays, Minnesota Twins, Kansas City Royals, Colorado Rockies, Pittsburgh Pirates, and Los Angeles Dodgers. In 1999, he played in one game for the Chunichi Dragons of Nippon Professional Baseball (NPB).

Before turning professional, Liriano played amateur baseball for Villa de Monte Llano. In 2007 and 2008, Liriano was the hitting coach for the Wilmington Blue Rocks, and served as the manager of the Burlington Royals from 2009 to 2011. As of 2019, Liriano is the hitting coach of the Northwest Arkansas Naturals, yet another Royals affiliate.

In a six-day span with the Toronto Blue Jays in 1989, Liriano broke up two no-hitters in the ninth inning. He had a one-out triple off the Texas Rangers' Nolan Ryan on April 23, then robbed Kirk McCaskill of the California Angels with a pinch-hit, leadoff double on April 28.

Liriano has three daughters and son: Cindy, Minelia, Minelly, and Jesse.
