= Florence, South Carolina =

Florence
- City
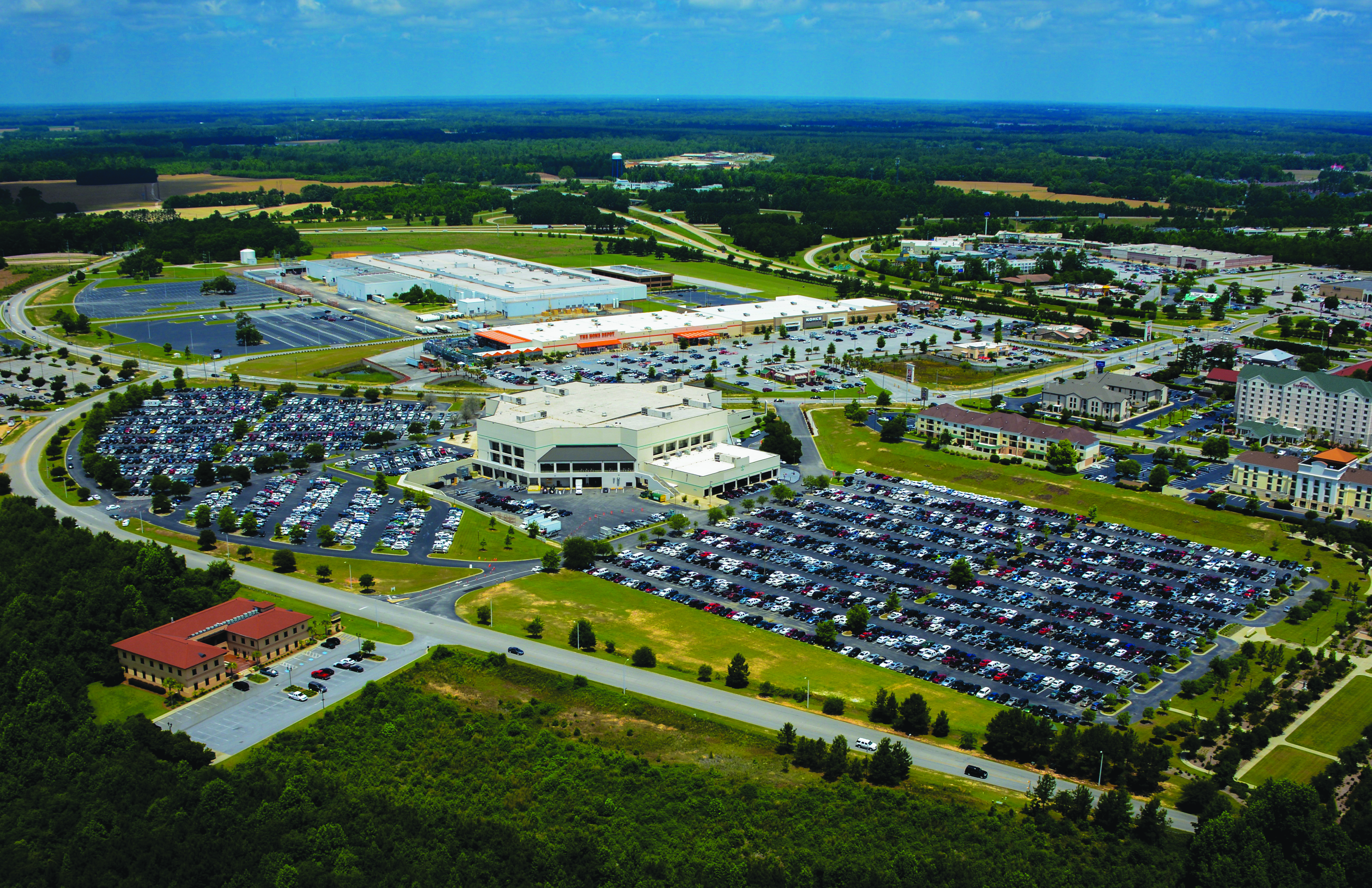
- Aerial view of the Florence Center

- Seal Logo
- Nicknames: Flo-Town, The Magic City
- Motto: "Full Life. Full Forward."
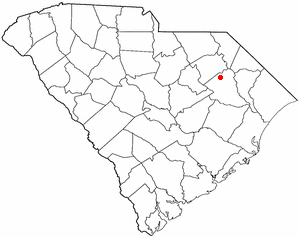
- Location in South Carolina
- Coordinates: 34°08′58″N 79°47′20″W
- Country: United States
- State: South Carolina
- County: Florence
- Incorporated: December 24, 1890
- Founder: Jerome P. Chase
- Named for: Florence Harllee

Area
  - City: 23.49 sq mi (60.83 km^{2})
  - Land: 23.39 sq mi (60.59 km^{2})
  - Water: 0.093 sq mi (0.24 km^{2}) 0.38%
- Elevation: 121 ft (37 m)

Population (2020)
  - City: 39,899
  - Density: 1,705.4/sq mi (658.47/km^{2})
  - Urban: 89,436 (US: 335th)
  - Urban density: 1,314/sq mi (507.5/km^{2})
  - Metro: 199,630 (US: 233rd)
  - Demonym: Florentine
- Time zone: UTC−5 (EST)
  - Summer (DST): UTC−4 (EDT)
- ZIP Codes: 29501–29506
- Area codes: 843, 854
- FIPS code: 45-25810
- GNIS feature ID: 2403621
- Website: www.cityofflorencesc.gov

Florence (/ˈflɒrəns/) is a city in and the county seat of Florence County, South Carolina, United States. It lies at the intersection of Interstates 20 and 95 and is the eastern terminus of the former. It is the primary city within the Florence metropolitan area. The area forms the core of the historical Pee Dee region of South Carolina, which includes the eight counties of northeastern South Carolina, along with sections of southeastern North Carolina. As of the 2020 census, the population of the city was 39,899, making it the 10th-most-populous city in the state.

One of the major cities in South Carolina, Florence was named an All-American City in 1965, presented by the National Civic League. The city was founded as a railroad hub and became the junction of three major railroad systems, including the Wilmington and Manchester, the Northeastern, and the Cheraw and Darlington. Florence is also a higher-education hub, home to Francis Marion University and Florence-Darlington Technical College.

== History ==
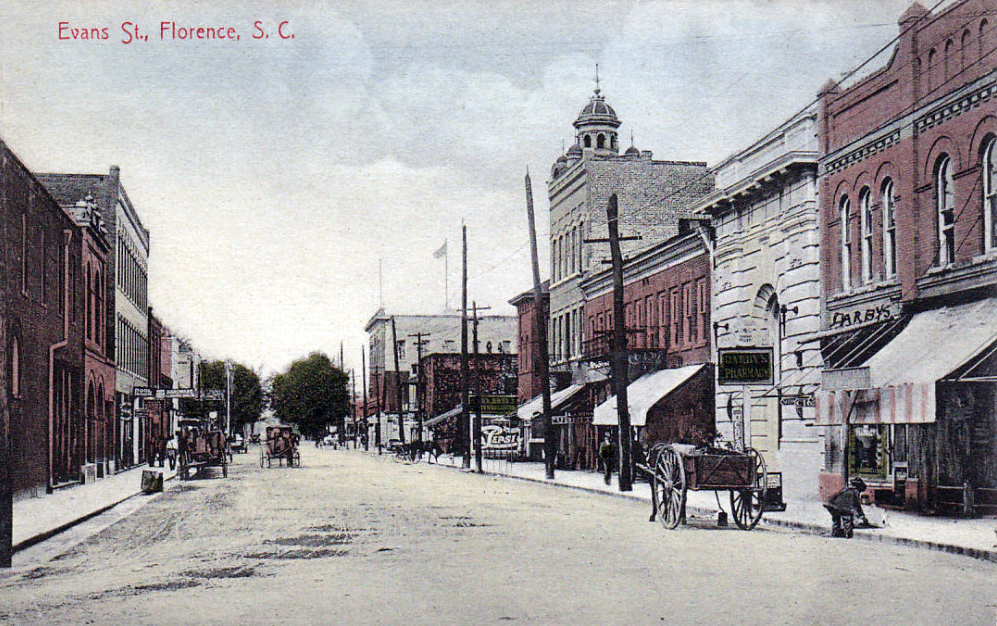
Evans Street c. 1910

The City of Florence was chartered in 1871 by the Reconstruction government and incorporated in 1890 following the 1888 creation of Florence County. Prior to its charter, the city was part of one of the original townships laid out by the Lords Proprietors in 1719. The area was gradually settled through the late 19th and early 20th centuries. Early settlers practiced subsistence farming and produced indigo, cotton, naval stores, and timber, which were shipped down the Great Pee Dee River to the port at Georgetown and exported. In the mid-19th century, two intersecting railroads were built, the Wilmington and Manchester (W&M) and the Northeastern. General William Harllee, the president of the W&M, built his home at the junction, and named the community "Florence", after his daughter.

=== American Civil War ===
During the Civil War, the town was an important supply and railroad repair center for the Confederacy, and the site of the Florence Stockade, which held between 12,000 and 18,000 Union prisoners of war. Over 2,800 prisoners died of disease and were buried there. The burial ground adjacent to the prison became the Florence National Cemetery after the war and now has expanded.

=== Early 20th century ===
After the war, Florence grew and prospered, using the railroad to supply its cotton, timber, and by the turn of the century, tobacco. During the 20th century, the economy of Florence came to rely heavily on the healthcare industry, driven by two major hospitals and a number of pharmaceutical plants. Industry grew, especially after World War II, when Florence became increasingly known for textiles, pharmaceuticals, paper, and other manufacturing, in addition to agricultural products.

Florence also has a budding theater scene, starting with creating the Community Players in 1923. Over the years, the theater troop had several names, such as the Pinewood Plays, the Little Theater Guild, and eventually, the Florence Little Theater Guild. After a fire that took their original performance home at the Pinewood Club, the troupe used spaces such as the YMCA, high school gyms, and the Army Air Base movie house to perform. In 1968, the first Florence Little Theater was built, but in 2008, a new Florence Little Theater was built due to a need for more space. In 2023, the Florence Little Theater celebrated 100 years of performances opening with The Sound of Music.

=== Downtown revitalization ===
In 2010, the city of Florence began a massive redevelopment of downtown Florence. The city has completed several notable projects and has several more planned. The Downtown Redevelopment District was originally a 70-square-block area encompassing some 500 acres (2.0 km^{2}) in the heart of the City of Florence, but now has added over 100 more acres of the Timrod Park area with its historic homes. The redevelopment of Florence has even created a new branding effort, to include new city department logos (not to be confused with the city seal) directional signs and repainting water towers.

The historic downtown district, running from the central business district toward the McLeod Medical Center, features a number of historic buildings that have been rehabilitated. The redevelopment started with the $18 million Drs. Bruce and Lee Foundation Library, and today now has the new Florence Little Theater, some 60 new apartments, and the Francis Marion University Performing Arts Center, which opened in September 2011, as well the new Florence Museum of Art, Science and History, which opened October 11, 2014. New office space has emerged from once abandoned buildings, and a police substation was added on Dargan Street.

Special efforts are being aimed at the downtown area, which was once the center of the city's activity, but now remains dormant after retailers and shoppers left for suburban malls. The goal is to re-establish Evans as a vibrant commercial and residential corridor, and five blocks of Evans Street were to be streetscaped.

== Geography ==
Florence is located in the coastal plain of South Carolina, in the northeastern part of the state and the northern part of Florence County. The elevation above sea level is around 140 ft (43 m). Jeffries Creek, a tributary of the Great Pee Dee River, is the main waterway that flows through the city, passing south of the city center. According to the United States Census Bureau, the city has a total area of 23.49 square miles (60.8 km^{2}), of which 0.09 sq mi (0.23 km^{2}) (0.38%) is covered by water.

=== Climate ===
The climate experienced is humid subtropical (Köppen climate classification Cfa) of the type found in the Deep South, especially far from the coast. Autumn, winter, and spring are mild, with occasional winter nights below freezing, but they rarely feature extended cold and rigorous conditions. Florence's summers can be very hot and humid. The city, like others in the Southeast, is prone to inversions, which trap ozone and other pollutants over the area.

Climate data for Florence, South Carolina (1991–2020 normals, extremes 1896–present)
Month	Jan	Feb	Mar	Apr	May	Jun	Jul	Aug	Sep	Oct	Nov	Dec	Year
Record high °F (°C)	82 (28)	88 (31)	98 (37)	98 (37)	102 (39)	106 (41)	107 (42)	107 (42)	108 (42)	100 (38)	89 (32)	85 (29)	108 (42)
Mean maximum °F (°C)	74.9 (23.8)	77.2 (25.1)	83.7 (28.7)	87.6 (30.9)	93.8 (34.3)	97.5 (36.4)	99.1 (37.3)	98.2 (36.8)	94.6 (34.8)	88.0 (31.1)	81.1 (27.3)	75.9 (24.4)	100.4 (38.0)
Mean daily maximum °F (°C)	56.9 (13.8)	60.0 (15.6)	67.8 (19.9)	76.3 (24.6)	83.3 (28.5)	89.4 (31.9)	92.9 (33.8)	91.1 (32.8)	86.0 (30.0)	76.8 (24.9)	67.5 (19.7)	59.8 (15.4)	75.6 (24.2)
Daily mean °F (°C)	45.5 (7.5)	48.2 (9.0)	55.6 (13.1)	63.7 (17.6)	71.9 (22.2)	79.1 (26.2)	82.7 (28.2)	80.8 (27.1)	75.4 (24.1)	65.0 (18.3)	54.7 (12.6)	48.2 (9.0)	64.2 (17.9)
Mean daily minimum °F (°C)	34.2 (1.2)	36.4 (2.4)	43.4 (6.3)	51.2 (10.7)	60.4 (15.8)	68.8 (20.4)	72.4 (22.4)	70.5 (21.4)	64.8 (18.2)	53.1 (11.7)	42.0 (5.6)	36.5 (2.5)	52.8 (11.6)
Mean minimum °F (°C)	17.2 (−8.2)	21.6 (−5.8)	25.7 (−3.5)	34.4 (1.3)	45.6 (7.6)	57.9 (14.4)	64.2 (17.9)	61.4 (16.3)	51.5 (10.8)	36.3 (2.4)	25.9 (−3.4)	22.5 (−5.3)	15.8 (−9.0)
Record low °F (°C)	1 (−17)	−1 (−18)	16 (−9)	23 (−5)	35 (2)	48 (9)	54 (12)	51 (11)	39 (4)	23 (−5)	16 (−9)	6 (−14)	1 (−17)
Average precipitation inches (mm)	3.66 (93)	3.65 (93)	3.47 (88)	3.45 (88)	3.85 (98)	4.48 (114)	4.69 (119)	5.51 (140)	5.06 (129)	3.36 (85)	3.05 (77)	3.89 (99)	48.12 (1,222)
Average precipitation days (≥ 0.01 in)	10.8	9.5	9.9	8.4	9.1	10.9	12.2	11.5	8.8	8.2	8.1	10.6	118.0
Source: NOAA

== Demographics ==
Historical population
Census	Pop.	Note	%±
1880	1,914		—
1890	3,395		77.4%
1900	4,647		36.9%
1910	7,057		51.9%
1920	10,968		55.4%
1930	14,774		34.7%
1940	16,054		8.7%
1950	22,513		40.2%
1960	24,722		9.8%
1970	25,997		5.2%
1980	29,842		14.8%
1990	29,813		−0.1%
2000	30,248		1.5%
2010	37,056		22.5%
2020	39,899		7.7%
2023 (est.)	40,609		1.8%
U.S. Decennial Census; 2020

=== 2020 census ===
As of the 2020 census, 39,899 people, 16,619 households, and 9,671 families were residing in Florence. The median age was 40.1 years, with 23.0% of residents under 18 and 19.0% 65 or older. For every 100 females, there were 83.3 males, and for every 100 females 18 and over, there were 78.4 males.

Of the 16,619 households in Florence, 30.8% had children under 18 living in them, 36.8% were married-couple households, 17.9% were households with a male householder and no spouse or partner present, and 40.1% were households with a female householder and no spouse or partner present. About 32.8% of all households were made up of individuals, and 13.7% had someone living alone who was 65 or older.

The city had 18,267 housing units, of which 9.0% were vacant. The homeowner vacancy rate was 1.7% and the rental vacancy rate was 9.0%.

Almost all of the residents lived in urban areas, while 0.6% lived in rural areas.

Racial composition as of the 2020 census
Race	Number	Percentage
White	18,154	45.5%
Black or African American	18,710	46.9%
American Indian and Alaska Native	84	0.2%
Asian	928	2.3%
Native Hawaiian and other Pacific Islander	12	0.0%
Some other race	456	1.1%
Two or more races	1,555	3.9%
Hispanic or Latino (of any race)	1,105	2.8%

=== 2000 census ===
At the 2000 census, 30,248 people, 11,925 households, and 7,882 families lived in the city. The population density was 1,709.4 people per square mile (660.0 people/km^{2}). The 13,090 housing units had an average density of 739.7 per square mile (285.6/km^{2}). The racial makeup of the city was 50.0% White, 46.0% Black or African American, 0.18% Native American, 1.16% Asian, 0.22% from other races, and 0.71% from two or more races. Hispanics or Latinos of any race were 0.76% of the population.

Of the 11,925 households, 30.2% had children living with them, 41.9% were married couples living together, 20.7% had a female householder with no husband present, and 33.9% were not families. About 29.5% of all households were made up of individuals, and 10.4% had someone living alone who was 65 or older. The average household size was 2.44, and the average family size was 3.03.

In the city, the age distribution was 25.0% under 18, 8.7% from 18 to 24, 28.2% from 25 to 44, 23.0% from 45 to 64, and 15.1% who were 65 or older. The median age was 37 years. For every 100 females, there were 82.8 males. For every 100 females 18 and over, there were 77.5 males.

The median income in the city for a household was $35,388 and for a family was $42,250. Males had a median income of $35,633 versus $23,589 for females. The per capita income for the city was $20,336. Of the population 19.3% and 15.3% of families, and 28.2% of those under 18 and 15.9% of those 65 and older, were living below the poverty line.

Its central city of the Florence, South Carolina metropolitan area, it has a total population of 205,566 (2010 US census), including the entire populations of Florence and Darlington Counties. However, in the more detailed 2000 Census data, only about 54% of this metro was urbanized, consisting of the urban areas Florence (2000 pop.: 67,314), Hartsville (14,907), Darlington (12,066), and Lake City (8,728). The remainder of the Florence metro is considered rural.

=== Religion ===
Like other midsized cities in the Southern United States, Florence's population is largely dominated by Protestantism, the largest group being the Southern Baptists, followed by the Methodists. The rest of the population is distributed among other Protestant denominations, as well as the Roman Catholic and Greek Orthodox Churches. The Greek Orthodox Church holds a large Greek Festival annually in September. One Reform Judaism synagogue is in Florence, Beth Israel Congregation. Also a small Hindu temple is located there.

== Government ==
The city of Florence has a council-manager form of government. City council members are elected every four years, without term limits. The council consists of seven members (three from districts, three at-large, and the mayor). The council is responsible for making policies and enacting laws, rules, and regulations to provide for future community and economic growth. The council additionally provides the necessary support for the orderly and efficient operation of city services. Florence holds elections for mayor every four years, alongside national Presidential elections. Mayors serve as a member of the city council, without term limits. The council appoints a city manager to serve as chief administrative officer to run the day-to-day business of the city and to serve at the pleasure of the council.

Current members of the Florence City Council:

Council member	District represented
Lethonia Barnes, Mayor	At-large
LaShonda NeSmith-Jackson	District 1
J. Lawrence Smith, II	District 2
Bryan A. Braddock	District 3
George D. Jebaily	At-large
Chaquez T. McCall	At-large
Zach McKay	At-large

== Economy ==
In the late 20th early 21st centuries, Florence's economy was transformed from being based largely on rail services and farming into a diversified economy as the major commerce, finance, rail and trucking services, health care, and industrial center of the Eastern Carolinas. Over nine foreign-affiliated companies and 14 Fortune 500 companies are in the region. The gross domestic product of the Florence metropolitan statistical area (MSA) as of 2009 was $6.8 billion, one of the highest among MSAs in the state.

The Milken Institute 2008 Best Performing Cities Index showed the Florence MSA as the fifth-largest gainer in its evaluation of the top 124 small metropolitan areas in the United States. The report ranks U.S. metropolitan areas by how well they are creating and sustaining jobs and economic growth. The components include job, wage and salary, and technology growth.

Florence has blossomed into a strong center for medical care, with four major medical providers McLeod Regional Medical Center, Medical University of South Carolina Hospital, Regency Hospital, and HealthSouth. The growth of these providers has led to the transformation of the Florence skyline over the last 10 years, with development for demand with multi-story high-rises as well as community relation projects.

Florence's robust healthcare and corporate presence has attracted several global and national operations to the region, spanning across multiple different industries:

- Healthcare & Insurance: GE Healthcare operates a major MRI manufacturing facility here, alongside regional operations for TRICARE which serves the US armed forces and its civilian employees and Assurant property and personal insurance.
- Pharmaceuticals: The city hosts a Patheon pharmaceutical manufacturing plant as well as a dedicated research and development center for Patheon API Services

Florence also serves as the financial and service hub for the Eastern Carolinas, with many financial and professional management institutions invested heavily within the city. Companies with regional operations and headquarters include Truist Financial, Monster.com, Otis Elevator, CSX Transportation and Wells Fargo. Florence has operation headquarters for AT&T and is the southeastern headquarters of Duke Energy Inc.

Florence has benefited from being located at the intersection of I-95 and I-20, roughly halfway between New York City and Miami, Florida. The city is located 80 miles (130 km) east from the state capital Columbia, 70 miles (110 km) west from Myrtle Beach, 120 miles (190 km) north of Charleston, and 110 miles (180 km) southeast of Charlotte, North Carolina. This has allowed Florence to remain competitive and bring in and sustain major manufacturers such as, General Electric, Honda, QVC Distribution Center, and Otis Elevator.

== Education ==
=== Public schools ===
The Florence Public School District One is the governing body of the public schools in the area. As of 2010, the district has an active enrollment of 14,500 students, attending a total of 20 schools, including 13 elementary schools, four middle schools, and three high schools serving the City of Florence, Effingham, and Quinby areas. The school system also supports an alternative school for middle and/or high school students, a vocational career center, and an adult-learning center. The district and its schools have been recognized as being among the state's best with numerous awards, including the Palmetto's Finest award.

=== Private schools ===
- All Saints' Episcopal Day School (prekindergarten-grade 6)
- Florence Christian School (prekindergarten-grade 12)
- Maranatha Christian School (prekindergarten-grade 12)
- Montessori School of Florence prekindergarten-grade 6)
- The King's Academy (prekindergarten-grade 12)
- Saint Anthony Catholic School (prekindergarten-grade 8)
- Trinity Collegiate School (grades 6–12)

=== Higher education ===
Facilities of higher education in and around Florence include Francis Marion University and Florence–Darlington Technical College. Francis Marion University is a public university, while Florence–Darlington Technical College also operates satellite campuses in Hartsville, Lake City, and Mullins.

=== Library ===
Florence has a public library, a branch of the Florence County Library System. The Florence County Public Library has a room, the South Carolina Room, dedicated to South Carolina history and genealogy.

== Healthcare ==
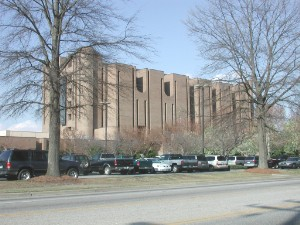
McLeod Regional Medical Center

McLeod Regional Medical Center is a 453-bed, nonprofit medical center located on a 75-acre (300,000 m^{2}) campus in downtown Florence. The hospital complex in downtown contains the Cardiovascular Institute, the Center for Advanced Surgery, the Cancer Center, and the only specialized pediatrics unit in the northeastern portion of South Carolina. It encompasses acute-care facilities, such as McLeod Regional Medical Center in Florence, McLeod Medical Center in Dillon, McLeod Medical Center in Darlington, and also operates campuses all over the Pee Dee region of South Carolina.

The Medical University of South Carolina (MUSC) Florence, formerly Carolinas Hospital System, a regional healthcare facility with 420 beds, serves eight counties in northeastern South Carolina.

Regency Hospital opened in Florence in July 2001. It is a 40-bed long-term acute-care hospital located on the fourth and fifth floors of the Cedar Towers, at 121 Cedar Street. Regency, with its corporate office based in Alpharetta, Georgia, has 20 hospitals nationwide, and continues to aggressively grow throughout the country.

McLeod Regional Medical Center and MUSC Florence are the first- and third-largest employers in the Pee Dee region of South Carolina.

== Transportation ==
=== Highways ===
- I-95 is a four-lane freeway that enters the city from the northeast and exits southwest. The highway leads northeast 87 miles (140 km) to Fayetteville, North Carolina, and southwest 179 miles (288 km) to Savannah, Georgia.
- I-20 is a four-lane interstate highway, which enters the city from the west and has a terminus in Florence as (David McLeod Blvd I-20 BS). Interstate 20 leads west 83 miles (134 km) to Columbia, then on to Atlanta and ultimately Texas.
- US 52 is a north-south route through the downtown area. The highway crosses Interstate 95 northwest of the downtown area and leads north 157 miles (253 km) to Winston-Salem, North Carolina. To the south, it merges with US 301 and eventually leads 113 miles (182 km) to Charleston.
- US 76 enters the city from the west at Interstate 95, then merges with David McLeod Blvd at Palmetto Street, and finally exits east of the city at the junction with Freedom Blvd. The road leads southwest 39 miles (63 km) to Sumter and east 115 miles (185 km) to Wilmington, North Carolina.
- US 301 offers another northeast to southwest route through Florence. Entering the city merged with US 52 as South Irby Street, it then forms a crescent-shaped bypass around the downtown area as Freedom Boulevard. US 301 then merges with US 76 east of downtown Florence and exits as such.

=== Mass transit ===
The Pee Dee Regional Transportation Authority (PDRTA) is the principal agency responsible for operating mass transit in greater Florence area including Darlington, Marion, Chesterfield, Dillon, and the Lake City area. PDRTA also operates routes to Columbia, Myrtle Beach, and Sumter.

PDRTA operates express shuttles and bus service for Florence and its immediate surrounding areas. The authority was established in June 1974; it is South Carolina's oldest and largest RTA. PDRTA began operations serving the six-county Pee Dee region of Chesterfield, Darlington, Dillon, Florence, Marion, and Marlboro Counties. The PDRTA has provided transportation for more than 15 million passengers and transports about 2,457 people daily. It operates services with 165 vehicles ranging in size from transit, intercity buses, and trolleys to lift-equipped vans and goshens. Public transport with PDRTA has been free from August 11, 2025.

=== Air ===
The city and its surroundings are served by Florence Regional Airport (IATA: FLO; ICAO: KFLO), which is located 2 miles (3.2 km) east of downtown Florence on US 76. The airport itself is serviced by American Eagle to Charlotte and is the second-busiest airport in the region behind Myrtle Beach International Airport. It is located an hour west of Myrtle Beach.

=== Intercity rail ===
Amtrak's The Palmetto trains 89, 90 and Silver Meteor (trains 97, 98) connect Florence with the cities of New York, Philadelphia, Wilmington, Baltimore, Washington, DC, Jacksonville, Orlando, and Miami. Additionally, the Florence station also serves as the refueling and crew-changing point for Amtrak's Auto Train service, which operates service between Sanford station in Florida and Lorton station Virginia, Passengers may temporarily disembark the train as needed.

=== Intercity bus ===
Greyhound Lines and Southeastern Stages operate a station on Irby Street, in the southern part of downtown, providing Florence with intercity bus transportation.

== Sports ==
=== Baseball ===
Baseball has a long history in Florence, dating back to the 1920s, when the Florence Swamp Foxes were founded. The minor league Florence Steelers played in Florence from 1948 to 1950. The Toronto Blue Jays had a minor league team that played in Florence from 1981 to 1986. Major league players Pat Borders, Jimmy Key, Cecil Fielder, and Fred McGriff made stops in Florence during their minor league careers. Florence's Post 1 American Legion baseball team is one of the longest-tenured teams in the state, beginning in 1932. Drawing the best high school talent from all over the Pee Dee area each summer, Post 1 has had over 30 players move on the professional ranks, including Reggie Sanders. They have won over 30 league titles and six state championships. They were the host site of the 2008 American Legion State Tournament. In 2012, Post 1 won the South Carolina state tournament and the Southeast Regional and participated in the American Legion World Series in Shelby, North Carolina.

Florence is home to the Coastal Plain League Florence Flamingos summer collegiate baseball team. Relocated to Florence in 1998, the team brings in players from collegiate sports conferences, including the Southeastern Conference and the Atlantic Coast Conference. The team hosted the 2004 All-Star game and Home Run Derby. In 2007, they hosted the Petitt Cup Tournament at their home field.

The Flamingos play at the 1,755-capacity Sparrow Stadium at Francis Marion University. The stadium is also hosts some home games for the Florence–Darlington Technical College Stingers baseball team. Post 1 plays its home games at American Legion Field, adjacent to Memorial Stadium, where Florence's three public high schools play their home football games.

Carolina Bank Field is a baseball stadium being built as part of the Florence Sports Complex to host the Flamingos starting in 2022.

=== Football ===
Until 2009, Florence was home to the American Indoor Football league's Florence Phantoms, which debuted in the league in 2006. The Phantoms played in the Florence Civic Center. Florence Memorial Stadium is a 7,000-seat football stadium 5 miles (8.0 km) to the east of the city. It is the home stadium for West Florence, Wilson, and South Florence high schools. An arena football team played there, too, briefly, but its contract at the Florence Center was not renewed.

=== Hockey ===
Florence was also home to the Southern Professional Hockey League's now-Twin City Cyclones, who played from 2005 to 2007. This team was part of a two-event package in 2004 to replace the now defunct Pee Dee Pride (to be the Myrtle Beach Thunderboltz) from the ECHL. The building was also the home of the South Carolina Fire Ants of Major League Roller Hockey in 1998.

=== Tennis ===
As of 2026, Florence hosts a W35 level Women's World Tennis Tour tournament.

== Media ==
Florence and Grand Strand share a common defined market by Nielsen Media Research in Horry, Marion, Dillon, Darlington, Marlboro, Scotland, Robeson, and Florence counties. The Florence/Myrtle Beach Market is the 103rd largest market in the US as defined by Nielsen Media Research. CBS/MyNetworkTV affiliate WBTW 13, ABC/The CW affiliate WPDE-TV 15 and SCETV (PBS) outlet WJPM-TV 33 are licensed to Florence. NBC affiliate WMBF-TV 32 and Fox affiliate WFXB 43 are licensed to Myrtle Beach but also serve Florence. WBTW and WPDE have moved most of their operations to Myrtle Beach and Conway, respectively, due to the Grand Strand's larger population.

Florence, along with the Pee Dee Region, makes up the 217th-largest radio market in the United States. Cumulus Media and iHeart Media, the largest and third-largest radio station ownership groups in the country, operate radio outlets in Florence.

The Morning News is the largest daily paper published in the Pee Dee, with a readership base extending across several counties. The paper has been in existence since 1922 and is published by BH Media Group, a Berkshire Hathaway Company. The area is also served by several weekly papers, including the News Journal and the Community Times.

== Notable people ==
Arts

- Blackie Collins, author and knife maker
- Graves of Valor, band
- The Independents, band
- William Johnson, artist
- Taft Jordan, jazz trumpeter
- Matt Laug, drummer
- Trey Lorenz, musician
- Philip B. Meggs, author and historian
- Gillian Murphy, ballet dancer
- Houston Person, musician
- Padgett Powell, author
- Doug Quattlebaum, Piedmont blues guitarist, singer and songwriter
- Sequoyah Prep School, band
- Through the Eyes of the Dead, band
- Henry Timrod, so-called "poet laureate of the Confederacy"
- Alice R. Ballard, ceramicist

Entertainment

- Dwayne Cooper, drag queen and actor
- K. Lee Graham, Miss South Carolina Teen USA 2013, Miss Teen USA 2014
- Mark L. Walberg, television host

Politics and law

- Beverly Daggett, politician
- Alvin Greene, politician
- Charles Weston Houck, judge
- William C. James, Marine brigadier general
- Robin Tallon, politician

Sports

- Michael Allen Anderson, professional baseball outfielder
- Buddy Baker, NASCAR racecar driver
- Ron Barfield Jr., NASCAR racecar driver
- Brandon Bostick, professional football player (NFL)
- Akeem Bostick, professional baseball player (MLB)
- Harry Carson, professional football player (NFL)
- Jim David, professional football player (NFL)
- Fisher DeBerry, football coach
- Darian Durant, professional football player (CFL)
- Justin Durant, professional football player (NFL)
- Malliciah Goodman, professional football player (NFL)
- Clayton Holmes, professional football player (NFL)
- Nick Nelson, professional football player (NFL)
- Reggie Sanders, professional baseball player (MLB)
- Lawrence Timmons, professional football player (NFL)
- Ron Turner, swimming coach
- Cale Yarborough, NASCAR driver, four-time Daytona 500 champion
- Michael Kesselring, NHL defenseman, Buffalo Sabers
- Lanorris Sellers, American football player

== See also ==
- List of municipalities in South Carolina
