= Peninsula Pilots =

Coastal Plain League baseball team

- Logo

Information
- League: Coastal Plain League (East)
- Location: Hampton, Virginia
- Ballpark: War Memorial Stadium
- Founded: 2000
- Petitt Cup championships: 2013, 2014
- Division championships: 2006, 2007, 2009, 2013, 2014, 2016, 2017, 2018
- Colors: Orange, Navy Blue, and Light Blue
- Mascot: Slyder
- Ownership: Henry Morgan
- Management: Matt Mitchell
- Coach: Hank Morgan
- Website: www.peninsulapilots.com

The Peninsula Pilots are an amateur baseball team in the Coastal Plain League, collegiate summer baseball league. The team plays its home games at the War Memorial Stadium in Hampton, Virginia. The Pilots first started participating in the Coastal Plain League in 2000. The Pilots are coached by Hank Morgan, a former player at Virginia Military Institute and Christopher Newport University.

== History ==
The Pilots moniker derives from the Peninsula Pilots (1963–1992), who were a member of the minor league baseball Class A Carolina League, who also played at War Memorial Stadium.

The Pilots have played in five Petit Cup Finals in their Coastal Plain League existence. They made it to back-to-back Petitt Cup Finals in 2006 and 2007, losing both times to the High Point-Thomasville HiToms, 6–1 and 4–3 respectively. The Pilots returned to the final in 2009 after winning the North Division where they faced the Forest City Owls and lost in two games. In 2013 and 2014, Peninsula broke through and won back-to-back titles, winning 2–0 and 2–1 over Columbia and Florence respectively. The Pilots set a team record for wins in 2014 when they won the second half East title and the top overall seed in the East. The Pilots are tied for the second most league titles in CPL history with the Edenton Steamers, Outer Banks Daredevils, Wilmington Sharks, and Forest City Owls, all of whom, including Peninsula, won their titles in consecutive years. The record is three, which is held by the High Point-Thomasville HiToms, who won three straight.

Hank Morgan is the winningest coach in Coastal Plain League history, with 378 wins as of the end of the 2019 CPL season. Morgan broke the previous record of 289 wins, held by former Fayetteville SwampDogs manager Darrell Handelsman, on Saturday, July 25, 2015.

== Yearly records ==
| Season | Manager | Record | Postseason Record |
|---|---|---|---|---|---|
| 2000 | Greg Mucerino | 13-31 |
| 2001 | Paul Knight | 24-27 |
| 2002 | Eric Coleman | 27-24 | 0-1 |
| 2003 | Greg Lovelady | 23-24 | 0-1 |
| 2004 | Ryan Morris | 29-19 | 0-1 |
| 2005 | Andy Wissinger | 23-32 |
| 2006 | Matt Ried | 37-21 | 3-1, L Finals |
| 2007 | Matt Ried(37) & Hank Morgan(22) | 35-24 | 3-1, L Finals |
| 2008 | Hank Morgan | 34-26 | 2-2 |
| 2009 | Hank Morgan | 38-24 | 3-3, L Finals |
| 2010 | Hank Morgan | 35-26 | 3-2 |
| 2011 | Hank Morgan | 27-29 | 0-2 |
| 2012 | Hank Morgan | 26-28-1 | 0-2 |
| 2013 | Hank Morgan | 33-22 | 6-2 CPL Champs |
| 2014 | Hank Morgan | 41-15 | 6-3 CPL Champs |
| 2015 | Hank Morgan | 28-25 | 1-2 |
| 2016 | Hank Morgan | 38-17 | 3-2 |
| 2017 | Hank Morgan | 32-22 | 0-1 |
| 2018 | Hank Morgan | 27-17 | 0-1 |
| 2019 | Hank Morgan | 27-26 |
| 2020 | Hank Morgan | 17-12 |
| 2021 | Hank Morgan | 32-11 | 0-2 |
| 2022 | Hank Morgan | 22-24 |
| 2023 | Hank Morgan | 22-24 |
| 2023 | Hank Morgan | 24-24 |
| 2024 | Hank Morgan | 34-13 | 0-2 |
| 2025 | Hank Morgan | 32-16 | 0-2 | Overall Record: 577-450-2 .562 | Pettit Cup Championship: 2 |

== 2013: First championship ==
The 2013 Pilots ended the regular season as the 2nd seed in the East behind the Edenton Steamers. The Pilots opened the playoffs hosting the 3 seed Wilmington Sharks. After allowing the Sharks to come back and win game 1 in Wilmington the Pilots won games 2 and 3 to move on to the next round. In the East Division Championship Series the Pilots faced the 1 seed Edenton Steamers who beat the Fayetteville Swampdogs to advance. The Pilots beat their rivals in 3 games to advance to the Petit Cup Championship. The Pilots made their fourth appearance in the CPL's championship series where they played the Columbia Blowfish and won the series in two games. Game 1 was played at home and ended in a Pilots walk-off win 5-4 on Alex Close's RBI in 10 innings. Game 2 was postponed due to rain in Columbia, SC and was shortened to 7 innings to accommodate the if necessary game 3. Game 2 also went into extra innings ending in 8 innings 2-1 on a Jordan Negrini RBI.

== 2014: Repeat champions ==
In 2014 the Pilots finished second in the East during the first half after losing the tie breaker to Edenton but used a 20–8 second-half run to overtake the Steamers and win both the second-half division title but also the number-one overall seed in the playoffs. After a first-round defeat of the Fayetteville Swampdogs, the Pilots advanced to the East Championship, where they defeated the Wilson Tobs to earn a trip back to the title game. In the West the Florence RedWolves won the Division Championship after sweeping regular-season titles and they advanced to face the Pilots. After a quiet game 1 loss to Florence the Pilots rallied to win the next two to clinch the title. In game three the Pilots trailed by one before the RedWolves committed three errors and allowed Peninsula to score eight runs, which sealed the title. During the season the 2014 Pilots became the first CPL team to defeat the USA College National Team by a score of 7–5 in a game where Peninsula trailed 5–0 after four innings.

== Notable alumni ==
- Ryan Zimmerman
- Buck Farmer
- Chad Pinder
- Jake Cave
- Jharel Cotton
- Deck McGuire
- Chris Rowley
- John Bowker
- Tug Hulett
- Darren Daulton
