= Holly Springs Salamanders =

Coastal Plain League baseball team

- Logo

Information
- League: Coastal Plain League (East)
- Location: Holly Springs, North Carolina
- Ballpark: Ting Stadium
- Founded: 2015
- Colors: Black, Gold and Royal
- Mascot: Sal
- Ownership: Capitol Broadcasting Company
- Coach: Brian Rountree
- Website: https://salamandersbaseball.com/

The Holly Springs Salamanders are an amateur baseball team in the Coastal Plain League, collegiate summer baseball league. The team plays its home games at Ting Stadium in Holly Springs, North Carolina. The head coach of the Salamanders is Brian Rountree and the assistant coaches are Mike Valder, Alex Burbidge, and Brian Coleman.

== History ==
The Salamanders play in the East Division with the Edenton Steamers, Morehead City Marlins, Greenville Yard Gnomes, Wilson Tobs, Wilmington Sharks and, Peninsula Pilots. On October 1, 2014, the Salamanders signed their first player, C Joey Roach from Georgia State. The Salamanders finished their inaugural campaign with a 28-28 record, advancing to the playoffs. The Salamanders lost to the eventual Petitt Cup Champions Edenton Steamers in the Divisional Round.

The Salamanders failed to make the playoffs in 2016, finishing the season with a 22-32 record. In 2017, the Salamanders came up short of the playoffs again, finishing with at 26-30 overall record.

The 19th annual Coastal Plain League All-Star Game was held at Ting Stadium July 9–10, 2017, with a crowd of 2,038 on hand to watch the East All-Stars defeat the West All-Stars 2-1. The All-Star Game was broadcast live to over 25 million homes in the United States through a partnership with 7 Communications and MLB.com.

Capitol Broadcasting Company purchased the team in November 2017. Capitol Broadcasting Company also owns the Durham Bulls and WRAL-TV, among other media entities.

On May 24, 2025, Alexia Jorge became the first woman to play in the Coastal Plain League, which she did as a catcher for the Salamanders.

== Yearly records ==
Season	Head coach	Record	Postseason
2015	Andrew Ciencin	28-28	1-2
2016	Andrew Ciencin	22-32	N/A
2017	Eric Sibrizzi	26-30	N/A
Overall record: 76-90		Division Titles: 0	

== Alumni ==
These former Salamanders have been selected in the MLB Draft:

	Player	Drafted	Parent Club	Season(s) with Salamanders	Highest Level Reached
1.	Chris Clare	Round 21, 631st overall (2016)	Baltimore Orioles	2016	A (Advanced)
2.	Joey Roach	Round 31, 930th overall (2016)	Tampa Bay Rays	2015	A (Full)
3.	Collin Woody	Round 38, 1,141st overall (2016)	Baltimore Orioles	2015	A (Full)
4.	Brian Miller	Round 1 CBA, 36th overall (2017)	Miami Marlins	2015	A (Full)
5.	Josh McLain	Round 14, 430th overall (2017)	Los Angeles Dodgers	2015	Unsigned
6.	Kory Behenna	Round 25, 761st overall (2017)	Boston Red Sox	2016	Rookie
7.	Tommy DeJuneas	Round 26, 792nd overall (2017)	Cleveland Indians	2015	Rookie
8.	Robbie Thorburn	Round 31, 938th overall (2017)	Baltimore Orioles	2015	Rookie
9.	Cody Roberts	Round 38, 1,139th overall (2017)	Miami Marlins	2016	Unsigned
10.	Matt Frisbee	Round 15, 436th overall (2018)	San Francisco Giants	2016	AAA
11.	Brett Callahan	Round 13, 380th overall (2023	Detroit Tigers	2022	MLB
