= Gastonia Rangers =

Class A minor league baseball team located in Gastonia, North Carolina

- 1973–1992; (1973-1974, 1987-1992); Gastonia, North Carolina

Minor league affiliations
- Previous classes: Class-A
- Previous leagues: Western Carolinas League (1973-1979); South Atlantic League (1980-1992)

Major league affiliations
- Previous teams: Texas Rangers (1973-1974, 1987-1992); St. Louis Cardinals (1977-1982); Montreal Expos (1983-1984); Independent (1985); Detroit Tigers (1986)

Minor league titles
- League titles (1): 1959

Team data
- Previous names: Gastonia Cardinals (1977-1982); Gastonia Expos (1983-1984); Gastonia Jets (1985); Gastonia Tigers (1986)
- Previous parks: Sims Legion Park I

The Gastonia Rangers were a class A minor league baseball team located in Gastonia, North Carolina. The team played first as the Rangers in the Western Carolinas League (1973–1974). In 1983 and 1984, they played as the Gastonia Expos, as an affiliate of the Montreal Expos. They later returned to the Rangers name in the South Atlantic League (1987–1992) and were affiliated with the Texas Rangers. Their home stadium was Sims Legion Park.

After the 1992 season, the team relocated to Hickory, North Carolina and become the Hickory Crawdads. The Hickory franchise continues play today.

== The end in Gastonia ==
Charlotte Hornets and Charlotte Knights owner George Shinn purchased the Gastonia franchise from Jack Farnsworth prior to the 1989 season. In doing so, it allowed Shinn the freedom to move the Charlotte Knights to Fort Mill, SC, without the move being challenged by the Gastonia franchise under Minor League Baseball's 35-mile territorial right rule. Once Shinn was able to acquire a Class AAA expansion franchise to play in Fort Mill, he no longer needed to control the interests of the Gastonia franchise and sold the team to Donald Beaver, who relocated the team to Hickory.

While Gastonia, NC, no longer has a team in the South Atlantic League, since 2002, it has been home to the Gastonia Grizzlies of the collegiate Coastal Plain League and the Gastonia Honey Hunters of the Atlantic League.

== Notable alumni ==
- Sammy Sosa
- Jeff Frye
- José Hernández
- Robb Nen
- Darren Oliver
- Iván Rodríguez
- Wilson Alvarez
- Kevin Belcher
- Juan Gonzalez
- Donald Harris
- Bill Haselman
- Jonathan Hurst
- Cris Colon
- Dean Palmer
- Rey Sánchez
- Benji Gil
- Danny Patterson
- Tug McGraw
- Jim Sundberg
- Mike Hargrove
- Dell Curry (one day contract promotion) P
- Muggsy Bogues (one day contract promotion) 2B

== Former owners ==
- Jack Farnsworth
- George Shinn

Fred Nichols - 1974 Pat McKernan - 1973

== Stadium ==
The Gastonia Rangers (as well as the future Gastonia Grizzlies) played at Sims Legion Park.
