= Tri-City Chili Peppers =

Coastal Plain League baseball team

- Logo

Information
- League: Coastal Plain League (North)
- Location: Colonial Heights, Virginia
- Ballpark: Shepherd Stadium
- Founded: 2020
- Mascot: Blaze
- Ownership: Byron Wurderman & Chris Martin
- General manager: Rob Perez
- Manager: James Bierlein
- Website: Official website

The Tri-City Chili Peppers are a collegiate summer baseball team playing in the Coastal Plain League. The team plays its home games at Shepherd Stadium in Colonial Heights, Virginia. The team joined the league in 2020 but didn't play due to the COVID-19 pandemic. Their first ever game was an 11-8 loss to the Holly Springs Salamanders on the road in North Carolina on Friday, May 28, 2021. Their first ever home game was a 10-8 win over the Wilson Tobs on Monday, May 31, 2021. On June 1, 2024, the Chili Peppers played under conditions they described as "Cosmic Baseball." The game was played under black lights, with glow-in-the-dark balls, bats, bases and uniforms.
