= Sims Legion Park =

Baseball park in North Carolina

- Interactive map of Sims Legion Park
- Location: Gastonia, North Carolina
- Coordinates: 35.279810°N 81.183813°W
- Owner: City of Gastonia
- Capacity: 3,000 (expandable to 4,500)
- Surface: Turf (formerly natural grass)
- Field size: Left Field: 335 Left-Center: 360 Center Field: 380 Right-Center: 360 Right Field: 335

Construction
- Opened: 1950 (Sims Legion Park I); 1977 (Sims Legion Park II)

Tenants
- Gaston Rhinos (NJCAA Division II) 2022– Local American Legion Baseball, 1972– Gastonia Pirates (WCL) 1966–1970; Gastonia Cardinals (WCL, SAL) 1977–1982; Gastonia Expos (SAL) 1983–1984; Gastonia Jets (SAL) 1985; Gastonia Tigers (SAL) 1986; Gastonia Rangers (SAL) 1987–1992; Gaston County King Cougars (ACL) 1995; Carolina Diamonds (NPF) 1997–98; Gastonia Grizzlies (CPL) 2002–2020

Sims Legion Park is a 3,000-seat baseball park in Gastonia, North Carolina that is the home field for Gaston College baseball. It has hosted the Gastonia Grizzlies of the Coastal Plain League, as well as American Legion baseball. The Grizzlies moved to Spartanburg, South Carolina starting with the 2021 season and were renamed the Spartanburgers.

The stadium underwent a total rebuild in the 1970s in order to attract a Minor League Baseball team. Since then the stadium has seen many tenants come and go. An ongoing effort to build a new ballpark in Gastonia in 2021 produced CaroMont Health Park, home to the Gastonia Honey Hunters of the Atlantic League. Sims Legion Park was further renovated between the 2021 and 2022 baseball seasons.

Players who've played here include Andy Van Slyke (Cardinals, Pirates), Sammy Sosa (Rangers, White Sox, Cubs, Orioles), Juan González (Rangers, Tigers, Indians, Royals), Iván Rodríguez (Rangers, Marlins, Tigers), and former Major Leaguer Tug McGraw (Mets, Phillies), who pitched one game for the Rangers in 1989.
