= Macon Bacon =

Coastal Plain League baseball team

- Logo

Information
- League: Coastal Plain League (West)
- Location: Macon, GA
- Ballpark: Luther Williams Field
- Founded: 2018
- Petitt Cup championships: 2 Appearances
- Colors: Red, Black
- Mascot: Kevin Bacon, The Grease, Notorious P.I.G.
- Ownership: Brandon Raphael-Managing partner, Dr. Daniel Erthal and others
- Management: Brandon Raphael (President)
- President: Brandon Raphael
- Manager: Jesse Litsch
- Website: https://www.maconbaconbaseball.com/

The Macon Bacon is a Georgia based wood-bat collegiate summer baseball team that began playing in the Coastal Plain League (CPL) in 2018. They have appeared in the league playoffs twice, and finished as the runner-up after a Championship appearance in their second season.

== History ==
In 2017, the Macon-Bibb County Commission announced that a Coastal Plain League franchise would be coming to Macon. It would be owned by sports marketing firm SRO Partners, and would begin play in the 2018 season. On July 6, 2017, SRO Partners and Macon-Bibb County signed a ten-year lease agreement for Luther Williams Field through December 31, 2027. In August 2024, it was announced that the lease had been extended through 2037.

Later in 2017, a contest was announced to select a name for the team. After receiving over 1,500 submissions, five finalists were selected: Macon Bacon, Macon Soul, Macon Hits, Macon Heat, and Macon Noise. A vote was held, with the name Macon Bacon being announced as the winner.

In November 2023, owner Steve Delay announced on LinkedIn that the team was being put up for sale. In August 2024 it was announced the purchase of the team was completed to Macon Bacon Baseball LLC which includes Managing Partner Brandon Raphael, and local investors Dr. Daniel Erthal, Ron Shipman, and Jonathan Pitts.

== Location ==
The team is based in Macon, Georgia and plays its home games at Luther Williams Field in Macon.

Prior to the inaugural 2018 season, the team announced plans to complete major renovations and updates to Luther Williams Field, in partnership with Macon-Bibb County. At a cost of approximately $2.5 million, the renovations would be funded by revenue from the 2016 Special-purpose local-option sales tax (SPLOST).

Further changes were made before the 2019 season and before the 2020 season.

== Coaching staff ==
Danny Higginbotham managed the team for the 2018 and 2019 seasons. At the end of the 2019 season, he announced plans to leave the team after being named as an Assistant Coach at Des Moines Area Community College. On September 10, 2019, the team named Jimmy Turk, an assistant coach at South Mountain Community College in Phoenix, Arizona as the new manager. On October 2, 2020, the team announced that Kyle MacKinnon had been named the head coach for the 2021 season. On September 21, 2021, the team named former assistant coach Kevin Soine the head coach for the 2022 season.

== Attendance ==
In 2018, the team was named the Coastal Plain League's Organization of the year after selling out 11 of 23 home games. It finished the 2018 season 2nd in attendance in the Coastal Plain League and 10th overall for the entire summer league, with an estimated home total attendance count of over 47,000.

== Yearly records ==
Season	Manager	Record
2018	Danny Higginbotham	22–25
2019	Danny Higginbotham	29–21
2020	Jimmy Turk	24–25
2021	Kyle MacKinnon	15–26
2022	Kevin Soine	24–24
2023	Easton Waterman	24–22
2024	Daniel Duarte	17–31
2025	Easton Waterman	17-27
2026	Jesse Litsch	33-20
Overall Record:		205–221

== Players in the pros ==
These former players have been selected in the MLB draft or have gone on to sign contracts with professional baseball teams:

	Player	School	Drafted	Drafted/Signed with	Season(s) with Bacon	Major League Debut
1	Dylan Spacke	Georgia	Round 21, 647th overall (2019)	Boston Red Sox	2018	
2	Matthew Minnick	Long Beach State	Round 23, 705th overall (2019)	New York Yankees	2018	
3	Riley King	Mercyhurst	Round 26, 787th overall (2019)	Atlanta Braves	2018	
4	Keaton Weisz	Coastal Carolina	Round 36, 1081st overall (2019)	Los Angeles Angels	2018	
5	MJ Rookard	Middle Georgia State University	Undrafted	Gary RailCats (Independent)	2019	
6	Zach McCambly	Coastal Carolina	Round 3, 75th overall (2020)	Miami Marlins	2018	
7	Zach Cornell	Middle Georgia State University	Undrafted	Washington Nationals	2019	
8	Fraser Ellard	Liberty University	Round 8, 245th overall (2021)	Chicago White Sox	2020	July 20, 2024
9	Matt Litwicki	Indiana University	Round 10, 286th overall (2021)	Boston Red Sox	2020	
10	Jack Sinclair	University of Central Florida	Round 16, 473rd overall (2021)	Washington Nationals	2020	
11	Josh Hood	University of Pennsylvania	Round 20, 586th overall (2021) Round 6, 186th overall (2022)	Boston Red Sox Seattle Mariners	2020	
12	Collin Price	Mercer University	Round 6, 193rd overall (2022)	Houston Astros	2020	
13	John Michael Bertrand	Notre Dame	Round 10, 316th overall (2022)	San Francisco Giants	2018	
14	Garrett Brown	Georgia	Round 18, 533rd overall (2022)	Chicago White Sox	2019	
15	Austin Emener	ETSU	Round 16, 472nd overall (2023)	Colorado Rockies	2022	
16	Patrick Clohisy	Saint Louis University	Round 11, 341st overall (2024)	Atlanta Braves	2023	
17	JR Freethy	University of Nevada	Round 14, 427th overall (2024)	Toronto Blue Jays	2023	
18	Kasen Wells	Weatherford College	Round 16, 480th overall (2024)	San Diego Padres	2024	
19	Nolan Clifford	Creighton University	Round 17, 498th overall (2024)	Colorado Rockies	2023	

== Post-season appearances ==
During their first season in 2018, the team advanced to the league playoffs. On August 5, they were eliminated in the first round after a 4–15 loss to the Savannah Bananas.

In the 2019 season, the team advanced to the League Championship, the Petitt Cup, for the first time, where they faced the Morehead City Marlins in a 3-game series for the Petitt Cup, where they finished as the runner up, losing by a margin of 1–2. Game 1 of the series resulted in a 3–0 loss to Morehead City. In game 2, Macon scored an 11–4 victory over Morehead City. Game 3 resulted in a 2–6 loss by Macon to Morehead City.

During the abbreviated 2020 season, the team advanced to the Coastal Plain League Championship, where they defeated the Savannah Bananas with a score of 6–5.

In the 2026 season, Macon advanced to the Petitt Cup Championship for second time after defeating the Forest City Owls in the West Divisional Championship. Macon would win game 1 of the championship series at home in a thrilling 3-2 victory. Macon would then head to Wilmington for game 2 and 3 to where in game 2 the Bacon would fall after a late comeback from the Sharks, losing 8-7. Finally in game 3 Macon was outscored 11-0 to lose the game and the series, finishing as the season runner-ups.
