= Atlantic Coast League (1995) =

- Sport: Baseball
- Founded: 1995
- Ceased: 1995
- No. of teams: 4
- Country: United States
- Last champion(s): N/A

The Atlantic Coast League (ACL), based in Gastonia, North Carolina, was a professional, independent baseball league located in the Southeastern United States. It operated in cities not served by Major or Minor League Baseball teams and was not affiliated with either. Founded in 1994, the league would fold less than a month into its first season of 1995. The league folded due to low attendance and an overall lack of financial stability.

== All-time results ==
| Team | City | W | L | Pct. | GB | Home Field | Average Attendance |
|---|---|---|---|---|---|---|---|
| Gastonia King Cougars | Gastonia, North Carolina | 12 | 3 | .800 | — | Sims Legion Park | 341 |
| Spartanburg Alley Cats | Spartanburg, South Carolina | 7 | 8 | .467 | 5 | Duncan Park | 541 |
| Florence Flame | Florence, South Carolina | 7 | 12 | .412 | 6 | Legion Field | 698 |
| Greenwood Grizzlies | Greenwood, South Carolina | 6 | 11 | .353 | 7 | Legion Stadium | 378 |

=== Proposed teams ===
- Anderson, South Carolina
- Orangeburg, South Carolina
- Sumter, South Carolina
