= Spartanburgers =

Coastal Plain League baseball team

- Logo

Information
- League: Coastal Plain League (South)
- Location: Spartanburg, South Carolina
- Ballpark: Duncan Park
- Founded: 2021
- Folded: 2022
- Former name: Gastonia Grizzlies (2002–2020)
- Former ballpark: Sims Legion Park (2002–2020)
- Colors
- Mascot: Tom 8-0
- General manager: Claudia Padgett
- Manager: Wesley Brown

The Spartanburgers were a collegiate summer baseball team playing in the Coastal Plain League in 2021. The team played its home games at Duncan Park in Spartanburg, South Carolina. The team, formerly the Gastonia Grizzlies, relocated from Gastonia, North Carolina for the 2021 season. The team name, announced in February 2021, was just the one word, not using the city name. On December 21, 2020, Wesley Brown was named head coach. The team played their first game on May 27, 2021, losing at home to the Lexington County Blowfish. The team's mascot was Tom 8-0, a giant ketchup bottle.

In March 2022, the Spartanburgers suspended operations for the 2022 season. The Coastal Plain League announcement referenced "financial hardships the former ownership group suffered" due to the COVID-19 pandemic and the expected cost of ballpark renovations.

In May 2023, Diamond Baseball Holdings bought the Down East Wood Ducks of the Carolina League and announced that the team would move to a newly built ballpark in downtown Spartanburg "as early as the 2025 season". The relocated team was renamed the Hub City Spartanburgers.
