= Forest City Owls =

Coastal Plain League baseball team

- Logo

Information
- League: Coastal Plain League (West)
- Location: Forest City, North Carolina
- Ballpark: McNair Field
- Founded: 2008
- League championships: 2009, 2010
- Colors: Forest Green and Gold
- Ownership: Phil Dangel, Rob Frost
- General manager: Sabrina Vetter
- Manager: DJ Russ
- Coach: Alex Khan
- Website: www.forestcitybaseball.com

The Forest City Owls are a baseball team in the Coastal Plain League, a collegiate summer baseball league. The team played its inaugural 2008 season in Forest City, North Carolina after the same franchise (previously known as the Stingers), owned by Ken Silver, moved from Spartanburg, South Carolina in the offseason. The Owls play their home games at McNair Field, a new baseball stadium constructed near downtown Forest City by the municipal government utilizing town funds, private contributions, and more than $1 million in donations from Robert C. McNair, a Forest City native and owner of the NFL Houston Texans. The Owls won their home (and season) debut on Thursday, May 29, 2008, by a score of 4–2 over the Gastonia Grizzlies before 2,675 fans. McNair threw out the first pitch, and the Owls turned an ever-rare triple play in the top of the 6th inning.

In the 2009 season, the Owls won the Petitt Cup, the Coastal Plain League title, after going 51–9 in 60 games during the regular season and postseason. Forest City's 22–2 start, 24 first-half victories, 25 wins at home, and 46 regular-season wins all were CPL records. The Owls were also voted as the No. 1 collegiate summer team in the country, courtesy of pgcrosschecker.com.

On January 27, 2011 it was announced that the Owls had been selected by USA Baseball to host Team Japan on July 1, 2011.

In the 2011 season, the Owls went back to the CPL playoffs to defend their back-to-back titles. The Owls fell in the second round to the Gastonia Grizzlies. The 2011 season was highlighted by the July 1, 2011 game of Team Japan vs. the Forest City Owls. Over 3,700 fans attended the game and witnessed the first-ever international game to be played at McNair Field. The Owls fell 8–1 to Team Japan but came back to have a 30–25 overall record for 2011. Over 64,400 fans walked through the gates at McNair Field that season.

In September 2015, Mr. Silver sold The Owls to Phil Dangel from Knoxville, Tennessee. In 2017, The Owls led The CPL with the most victories for the entire season, winning both the first and second half. They also were recognized by the All-Star committee by having 5 all-stars as well as the coach, Matt Reed, was selected to coach The Western Division All-Stars.

The Owls did not compete in the 2020 season due to COVID-19 restrictions in North Carolina.

The Owls finished the 2025 regular season with their best record since their championship run in 2010. After earning a first-round bye, they swept the Boone Bigfoots in the West Division Championship Series before being swept by the Wilson Tobs in their first Petitt Cup Championship appearance since 2010.

== Major League alumni ==
The Owls boast four alumni in Major League Baseball. Both lefty pitcher Josh Edgin and right-handed reliever Heath Hembree played for Forest City in 2008 and 2009. Edgin got drafted by the New York Mets, where he is still a member of the organization. Hembree initially signed with the San Francisco Giants and now plays for the Boston Red Sox.

Infielder Vince Belnome joined the team for the 2009 championship season. Belnome now plays 1st base in the Tampa Bay Rays organization.

Righty pitcher Spencer Patton played in Spartanburg in 2007 and made the jump to Forest City when the team moved in 2008. Patton made his Major League debut on September 4, 2014 and now pitches for the Texas Rangers. Patton also played with the Owls in 2009, where he finished with a 9-0 record and 1.46 ERA.

== Season-by-season results ==
Year	Head Coach	W-L	PCT	Overall Place	Postseason
2008	Matt Hayes	28-26	.519	2nd CPL West	CPL 1st round game: Lost to Florence RedWolves
2009	Matt Hayes	46-9	.836	1st CPL West	CPL 1st round game: Beat HPT HiToms CPL 2nd round series: Beat Fayetteville SwampDogs 2-0 CPL Pettit Cup Championship series: Beat Peninsula Pilots 2-0
2010	Matt Hayes	37-19	.661	1st CPL West	CPL 1st round series: Beat Asheboro Copperheads 2-0 CPL 2nd round series: Beat Peninsula Pilots 2-1 CPL Pettit Cup Championship series: Beat Edenton Steamers 2-1
2011	Matt Hayes	30-25	.545	T-2nd CPL West	CPL 1st round series: Beat Asheboro Copperheads 2-0 CPL 2nd round series: Lost to Gastonia Grizzlies 2-1
2012	Phil Disher	34-22	.607	1st CPL West	CPL 1st round series: Beat Asheboro Copperheads 2-1 CPL 2nd round series: Lost to Fayetteville SwampDogs 2-1
2013	David Tufo	17-32	.347	7th CPL West	
2014	Andrew Ciencin	30-25	.545	2nd CPL West	CPL West Division Semifinal series: Lost to Gastonia Grizzlies 2-1
2015	J.T. Maguire	22-33	.400	7th CPL West	
2016	J.T. Maguire	33-22	.600	1st CPL West	CPL West Division Semifinal game: Beat HPT HiToms CPL West Division Championship game: Lost to Savannah Bananas
2017	Matt Reed	36-18	.667	1st CPL West	CPL West Division Semifinal game: Lost to Gastonia Grizzlies
2018	Matt Reed	29-20	.592	2nd CPL West	CPL West Division Championship game: Lost to HPT HiToms
2019	Matt Reed	24-24	.500	2nd CPL West	CPL West Division Championship game: Beat Gastonia Grizzlies CPL Southwest Regional Championship game: Lost to Macon Bacon
2021	Connor Dailey	22-22	.500	5th CPL West	
2022	Connor Dailey	22-25	.468	4th CPL West	
2023	Connor Dailey	26-20	.565	2nd CPL West	CPL West Division Championship series: Lost to Lexington County Blowfish 2-1
2024	DJ Russ	28-18	.609	2nd CPL West	CPL West Division Championship series: Lost to Lexington County Blowfish 2-1
2025	DJ Russ	31-15	.674	1st CPL West	CPL West Division Championship series: Beat Boone Bigfoots 2-0 CPL Petitt Cup Championship series: Lost to Wilson Tobs 2-0
Total		495-375	.563		17 seasons
Playoffs		24-19	.558		13 playoff appearances, 2 championships
