= Shepherd Stadium =

American sports venue

- The Ballpark
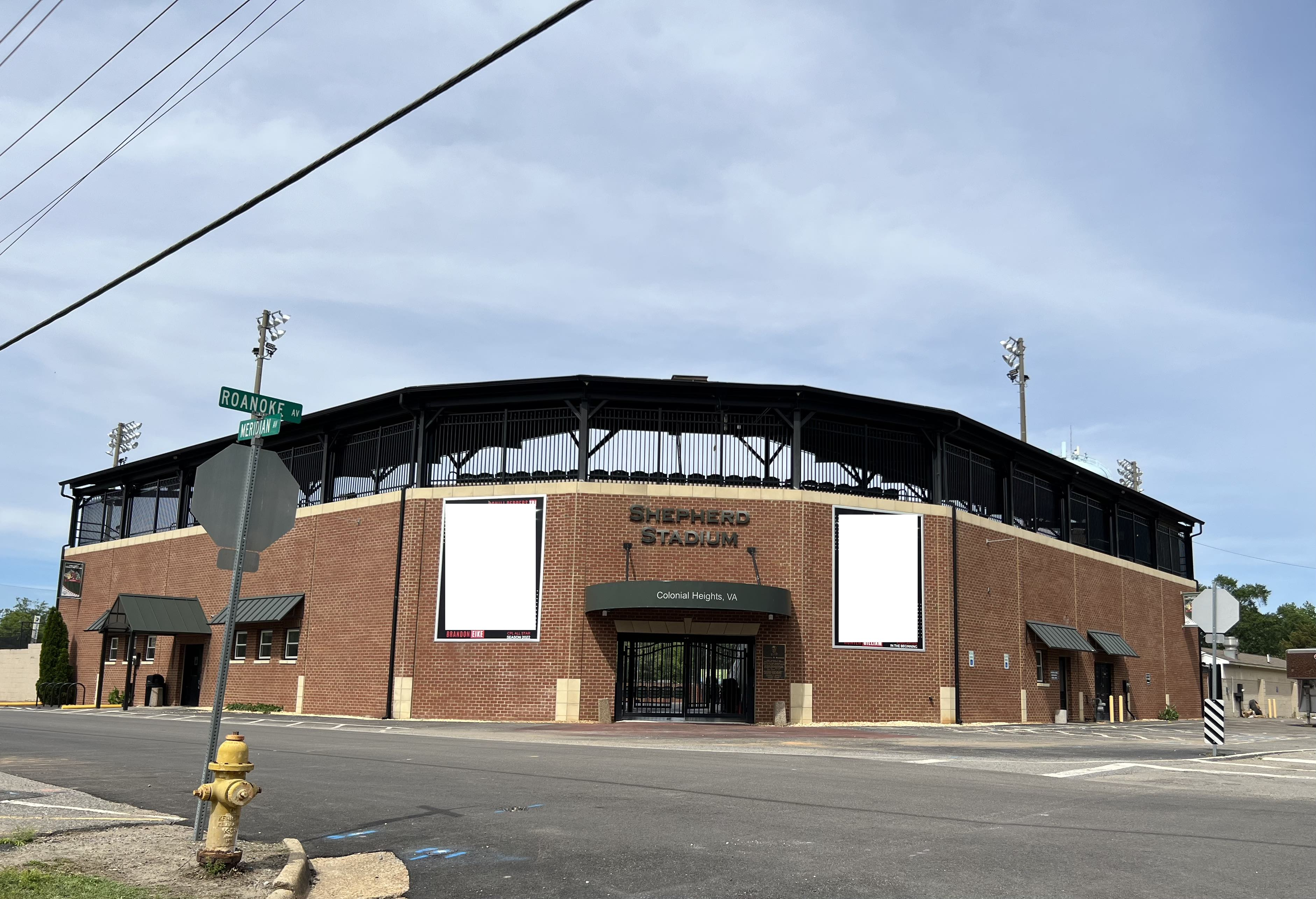

- Location within Virginia Location within the United States
- Interactive map of Shepherd Stadium
- Address: 901 Meridian Ave. Colonial Heights, Virginia 23834
- Coordinates: 37°14′57″N 77°24′56″W
- Owner: City of Colonial Heights
- Surface: Grass
- Field size: Left field: 330 ft (100 m); Center field: 374 ft (114 m); Right field: 330 ft (100 m)

Construction
- Opened: 1948
- Renovated: 2013-2018

Tenants
- Tri-City Chili Peppers (CPL) 2020-present American Legion Post 284, 1960-present Colonial Heights-Petersburg Colts (PL) 1954; Colonial Heights-Petersburg Generals (VL) 1951

Website
- Official website

Shepherd Stadium is a baseball stadium in Colonial Heights, Virginia which is home to the Tri-City Chili Peppers, a collegiate summer baseball team in the Coastal Plain League. Shepherd Stadium also hosts American Legion Post 284 baseball, the annual Optimist Club Boys' Invitational Baseball Tournament, Colonial Heights High School baseball, and city Rec and Parks youth baseball and softball programs. The stadium was built in 1948 and named for Mayor Fred R. Shepherd in 1951. A five-year renovation project concluded in 2018.
