= North Main Athletic Complex Stadium =

American sports venue

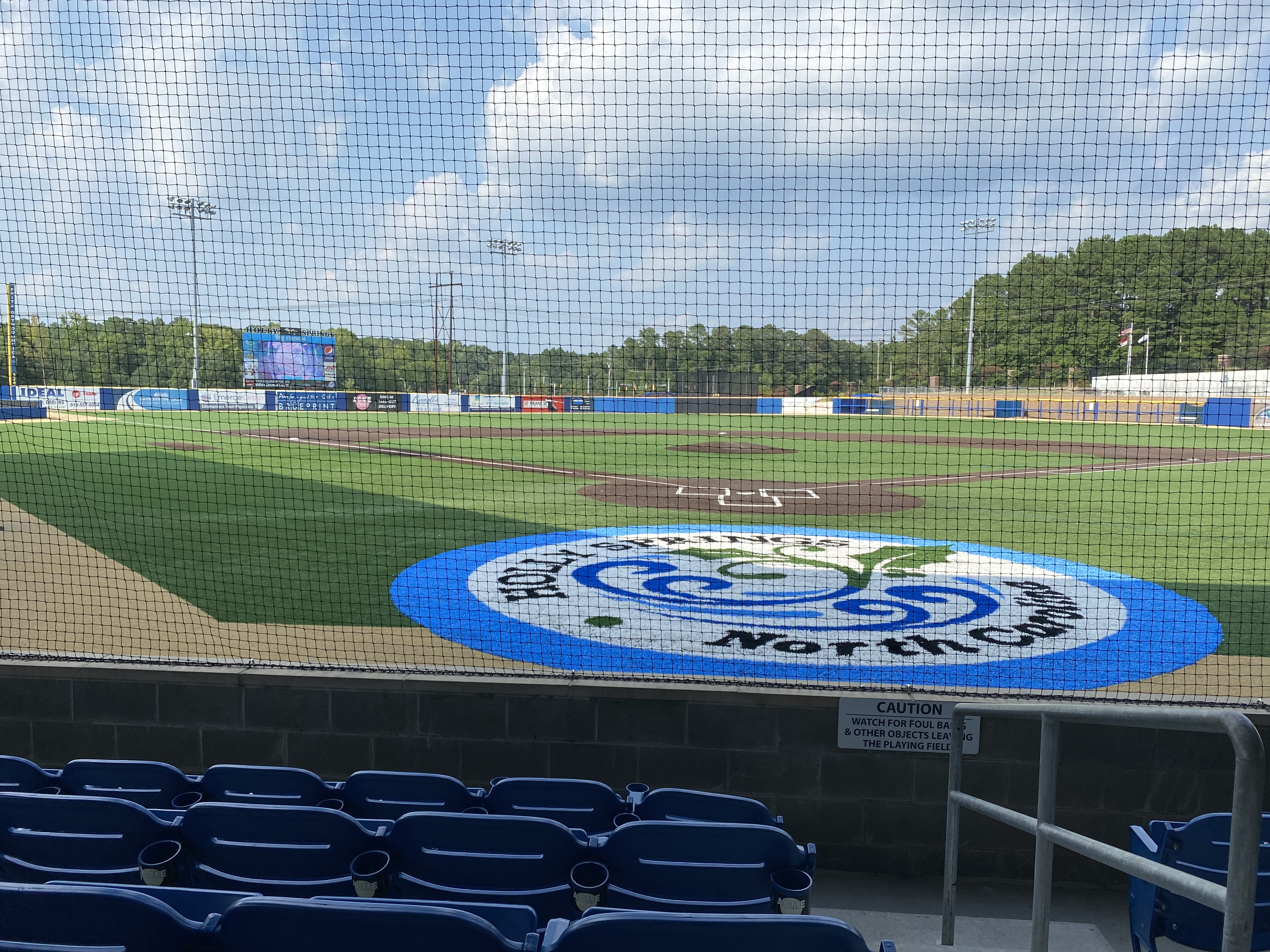
- Home Plate Premium seating, July 2021

- Location within North Carolina Location within the United States
- Interactive map of North Main Athletic Complex Stadium
- Former names: Ting Stadium (2017–2025); North Main Athletic Complex (2015–2017)
- Address: 101 Sportsmanship Way; Holly Springs, NC 27540
- Coordinates: 35°40′04″N 78°50′11″W
- Owner: City of Holly Springs
- Capacity: 1,800 seats
- Surface: Synthetic turf
- Field size: Left field: 320 ft (98 m); Left center: 355 ft (108 m); Center field: 400 ft (120 m); Right center: 365 ft (111 m); Right field: 305 ft (93 m)

Construction
- Opened: 2015
- Architects: Integrated Design, PA
- Services engineer: Stanford White

Tenants
- Holly Springs Salamanders (CPL) 2015– Wake FC (USL2) 2019– Wake FC Women (WPSL/USLW) 2019–

Website
- Official website

North Main Athletic Complex Stadium (formerly Ting Stadium) is a multi-purpose stadium in Holly Springs, North Carolina. It is home to the Holly Springs Salamanders, a collegiate summer baseball team in the Coastal Plain League, and to Wake FC, a collegiate summer soccer team in USL League Two. It is also used for recreational football, baseball, and soccer programs; and for rentals, concerts, festivals and other events. The stadium hosted the Coastal Plain League's 19th Annual All-Star Game in 2017.

The stadium is located in the North Main Athletic Complex, Holly Spring's city athletic complex. Naming rights to the North Main Athletic Complex were sold in 2017 to Ting Internet but their sponsorship expired in December 2025.

Beginning in 2019, Wake FC began playing semi-professional games for both their men's USL League Two and Women's Premier Soccer League team at North Main Athletic Complex Stadium.
