= Lexington County Baseball Stadium =

Baseball stadium in Lexington, South Carolina

- Interactive map of Lexington County Baseball Stadium
- Address: 474 Ball Park Rd. Lexington, SC 29072
- Location: Lexington, South Carolina
- Coordinates: 33.968°N 81.284°W
- Owner: Lexington County Recreation & Aging Commission
- Operator: Lexington County Blowfish
- Capacity: 2,573
- Surface: Natural grass
- Field size: Left Field: 318 ft Center Field: 394 ft Right Field: 302 ft

Construction
- Groundbreaking: 2014
- Opened: 2015
- General contractors: Quakenbush Architects and Planning

Tenant
- Lexington County Blowfish

Lexington County Baseball Stadium is a baseball stadium in Lexington, South Carolina. It is the home field of the Lexington County Blowfish of the Coastal Plain League, a collegiate summer baseball league. The stadium holds 2,573 spectators. The venue hosted the Big South Conference baseball tournament from 2016 through 2018.

The Blowfish operate Lexington County Baseball Stadium year round and holds its front office in the stadium.

The venue includes the Stadium Club, a climate-controlled area that hosts various events in the off-season and is booked as a hospitality area during the summer Blowfish season.
