= Alexia Jorge =

American baseball player (born 2003)

San Francisco Firebells – No. 26
- Catcher
- Born: August 17, 2003 (age 23)
- Bats: Right Throws: Right

WPBL debut
- 2026, for the San Francisco Firebells
- Stats at Baseball Reference

Teams
- San Francisco Firebells (2026–present)

Alexia Jorge (born August 17, 2003) is an American professional baseball player. She is currently a catcher for the San Francisco Firebells of the Women's Pro Baseball League.

== Early life and education ==
Jorge grew up in Lyndhurst, New Jersey. She began playing baseball at age 3, following her older brother. She played for Lyndhurst Little League, as a pitcher shortstop, and catcher. She was the only girl on her Little League team.

Despite being told she should play softball because she was a girl, Jorge wanted to play baseball. She was the first female athlete to play for Lyndhurst High School's varsity baseball team, where she played both pitcher and catcher.

She attended Saint Elizabeth University, where she was the first female baseball player at the school. At the time, she was one of only seven women who played college baseball. In 2022, she became the second woman to catch in a college baseball game. In 2024, she became the second woman to start as catcher in a college game.

== Professional career ==
As a 14-year-old, Jorge attended the Team USA girls' national baseball camp. She was the youngest player on the gold-medal-winning U.S. Baseball Women’s National Team at the 2019 COPABE Women’s Pan-American Championships. She also made the United States's 2026 Women’s Baseball World Cup roster for the Group Stage.

In 2025, she became the first woman to play in the Coastal Plain League, for the Holly Springs Salamanders.

In 2026, she was selected by the San Francisco Firebells 20th overall in the second round of the inaugural draft of the Women's Pro Baseball League.
