= Wake FC =

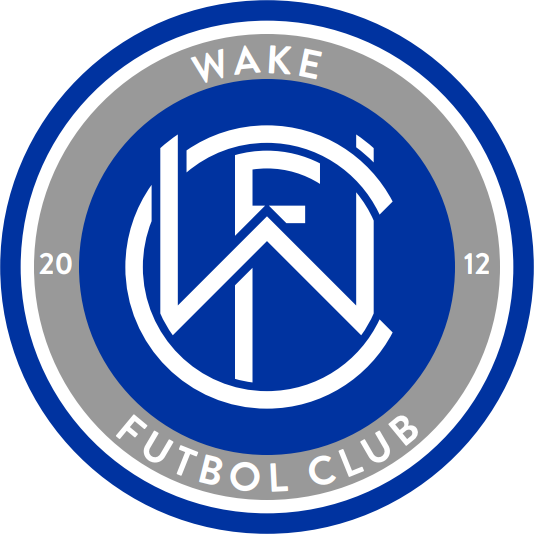
- Full name: Wake Futbol Club
- Founded: April 30, 2012; 14 years ago (youth academy); 2018 (semi‑pro teams)
- Stadium: Ting Stadium; Holly Springs, NC
- Capacity: 1,800
- President: David Allred
- Head Coach: Mark Jonas, USL2; Vacant, USLW
- League: USL League Two; USL W League
- 2024: 6th, South Atlantic Division; Playoffs: DNQ
- Website: wakefc.com
Home colours

Wake Fútbol Club is an American soccer club based in Holly Springs, NC. The team currently participates in USL League Two, a semi-professional soccer league organised by the United Soccer League.

The club was established in 2012 and plays its home games at Ting Stadium, with capacity for 1,800 spectators.

== History ==
Wake FC was founded in 2012 by a group of local soccer leaders in Wake County, North Carolina, with the goal of providing a community- and character-driven development pathway from youth to competitive soccer.

=== Expansion into semi-professional play ===
In April 2018, the club announced the launch of semi-professional teams in both men's and women's divisions. Their aim was to integrate the youth academy into higher-level competition by adding senior teams that could compete in national leagues.

==== Men's team ====
The men's team debuted in USL League Two (formerly the PDL) during the 2019 season. USL League Two is a top-level pre-professional summer league for U-23 players, including college athletes. It was rebranded from the Premier Development League in 2019 (the same year Wake FC joined), emphasising elite talent and serving as a key entry point to professional ranks.

The club revealed it's logo ahead of its first match on May 11 against NC Fusion U-23. Wake FC competes in the South Atlantic Division.

==== Women's team ====
In 2021, the United Soccer League announced that Wake FC had been admitted to the newly formed USL W League. The club became the second North Carolina side to join the competition, which planned to begin play in 2022. Club vice president Scott Zapko described the league as a significant opportunity for local female players, noting Wake FC's prior experience with USL operations and earlier versions of the W League.

=== Development infrastructure ===
The club's mission has consistently remained player development-focused. Wake FC integrates its youth academy with the senior sides, allowing U-23 academy players to train and play alongside collegiate athletes in USL League Two.

Home matches have been held at Ting Stadium since 2019 (men) and 2022 (women). Ting Stadium is a 1,800-seat facility built in 2015 within Ting Park in Holly Springs.

== Year-by-year ==
=== Women's team ===
As of July 8, 2026

Season	USL W League								Playoffs
Season	P	W	D	L	GF	GA	Pts	Pos	Playoffs
2022	12	6	1	5	10	17	19	3rd, South Atlantic	did not qualify
2023	12	6	2	4	21	17	20	3rd, South Atlantic	Did not qualify
2024	12	6	1	5	16	20	19	5th, South Atlantic	Did not qualify
2025	12	1	1	10	6	32	4	7th, South Atlantic	Did not qualify
2026	10	4	0	6	12	27	12	5th, South Atlantic	Did not qualify
