= McNair Field =

Baseball stadium in North Carolina

Coordinates: 35.339213°N 81.869807°W

McNair Field is a 2,000 seat baseball stadium located in Forest City, North Carolina. It was built in 2008 as the home of the Forest City Owls baseball team. It is also used for select games of the Gardner–Webb University Runnin' Bulldogs (Big South), Appalachian State Mountaineers (Sun Belt), Western Carolina University Catamounts, and Wofford College Terriers (SoCon) college baseball games.

Amenities at McNair Field include a beer garden down the right-field line, a popular feature in the summer-collegiate Coastal Plain League, as well as concession stands down the foul lines, a scoreboard complete with one of the CPL's only videoboards, which measures 8'10" by 15', minor league-style dugouts and bullpens, and a state-of-the-art lighting system.

It is named for Robert McNair, a Forest City native and founder of the Houston Texans football team.
