= O'Neal Field at Big Rock Stadium =

Baseball venue in North Carolina, US

- Location within North Carolina Location within the United States
- Interactive map of O'Neal Field at Big Rock Stadium
- Full name: Puck O'Neal Field at Big Rock Stadium
- Address: Morehead City, North Carolina
- Coordinates: 34.7366°N 76.7329°W
- Capacity: 1,800

Tenant
- Morehead City Marlins (CPL) 2010-present

Puck O'Neal Field at Big Rock Stadium is a baseball venue in Morehead City, North Carolina, United States. Also known as simply Big Rock Stadium, the venue is home to the Morehead City Marlins of the Coastal Plain League, a collegiate summer baseball league. The Marlins began play at the field for the 2010 season, after their arrival was announced in the fall of 2009.

== Construction ==
The building project was set in motion in 2003 by V.J. "Puck" O'Neal, for whom the field is named. O'Neal agreed to support the project if an American Legion-level facility was constructed in the city. He donated $100,000 to the city to purchase land for the project. In 2007, the Big Rock Blue Marlin Tournament contributed $175,000 for construction of a stadium at the newly built facility. After the arrival of the Marlins was announced, further renovations of the field took place in the winter of 2009. Big Rock's funds were used to construct additional seating at the venue.
