= Morehead City Marlins =

Coastal Plain League baseball team

- Logo

Information
- League: Coastal Plain League (East)
- Location: Morehead City, NC
- Ballpark: O'Neal Field at Big Rock Stadium
- Founded: 2010
- Petitt Cup championships: (2) 2018, 2019
- Division championships: (5) 2010 (South), 2018 (East), 2019 (East), 2022 (East), 2023 (East)
- Colors: Light Blue and Black
- Mascot: Finn the Marlin
- Ownership: Buddy Bengel
- Management: Alaina Alberico
- President: David Krakower
- Coach: Sam Carel
- Website: mhcmarlins.com

The Morehead City Marlins are a collegiate summer baseball team playing in the Coastal Plain League (CPL). The team is based in Morehead City, North Carolina and plays its home games at O'Neal Field at Big Rock Stadium in Morehead City. The team began play in the CPL in the 2010 season and competes in the league's East division.

== History ==
The Marlins first game was on May 26, 2010 at the Outer Banks Daredevils, a game the Marlins won 4-3. In Morehead City's inaugural season, the Marlins won the South Division and clinched a berth in the Pettit Cup Playoffs. In the 2010 Pettit Cup Playoffs, the Marlins were eliminated by the Edenton Steamers. Prior to 2016, 2010 was the only winning season in the brief history of the Morehead City Marlins franchise. Then, in 2018 and 2019, the Marlins won back-to-back Petitt Cup Championships under head coach Jesse Lancaster. The 2020 season was canceled due to the COVID-19 pandemic. The Marlins returned to Coastal Plain League play in 2021 in the East Division. They made the 2021 Petit Cup Championship but lost the series to Savannah.

== Yearly records ==
Season	Manager	Record	Postseason Record
2010	Jay Bergman	34-20	1-2
2011	Jay Bergman	27-29
2012	Brian McRae	25-30
2013	Jamie Sheetz	24-32
2014	Sam Carel	19-31
2015	Jason Wood	24-29
2016	Jason Wood	30-25	0-1
2017	Jesse Lancaster	25-30
2018	Jesse Lancaster	34-14	2-0
2019	Jesse Lancaster	37-14	2-1
2021	Jesse Lancaster	29-14	1-2
2022	Sam Carel	37-10	1-2
2023	Sam Carel	32-15	1-2
2024	Sam Carel	25-21
Overall Record: 378-314 .546		Division Titles: 5

== Coaching staff ==
The Marlins are coached by fifth year head coach Sam Carel who comes to the Marlins after coaching stops as a head coach at Northwestern Oklahoma State University (2014–2017) and Jefferson College (MO) (2006–2014) where he led the Vikings to back to back NJCAA Division 1 World Series Appearances in 2011 and 2012. Carel was also an assistant coach in 2003 for the Missouri State Bears baseball team that was a participant in the NCAA Division 1 College World Series in Omaha, Nebraska. In his four years with the Marlins, Carel has an overall record of 113-77, along with capturing regular season Eastern Division titles in 2022 and 2023. In 2023, the Coastal Plain League named Carel the CPL Coach of the Year.

== Rankings ==
In its inaugural season, Morehead City was ranked as high as 12th in the nation. The Marlins have not been ranked since.

== Location ==
The Morehead City Marlins play their home games at O'Neal Field at Big Rock Stadium, also home of the Morehead City Legion Post 46 baseball team. The stadium is located on Mayberry Loop Road in Morehead City, North Carolina.

The Marlins hosted the 2014 CPL All-Star Weekend at the "Rock."

== Alumni ==
- Shawn Armstrong - Cleveland Indians, Seattle Mariners, and Baltimore Orioles
- Chris Taylor - Seattle Mariners and Los Angeles Dodgers
- Cal Quantrill - Cleveland Guardians, Colorado Rockies, and Miami Marlins
