= Boone Bigfoots =

Coastal Plain League baseball team

Information
- League: Coastal Plain League (West Division)
- Location: Boone, North Carolina
- Ballpark: Jim and Bettie Smith Stadium
- Founded: 2021
- Mascot: Biggie
- Ownership: Philip Byers
- General manager: Sarah Strickland
- Coach: Hayden Pewitt
- Website: www.bigfootsbaseball.com

The Boone Bigfoots are a collegiate summer baseball team playing in the Coastal Plain League (CPL). The team plays its home games at Jim and Bettie Smith Stadium in Boone, North Carolina. The team, which began play in 2021, joined the CPL in the 2023 season and competes in the league's West division.
