= Duncan Park =

Stadium in Spartanburg, Carolina, United States

Duncan Park Stadium
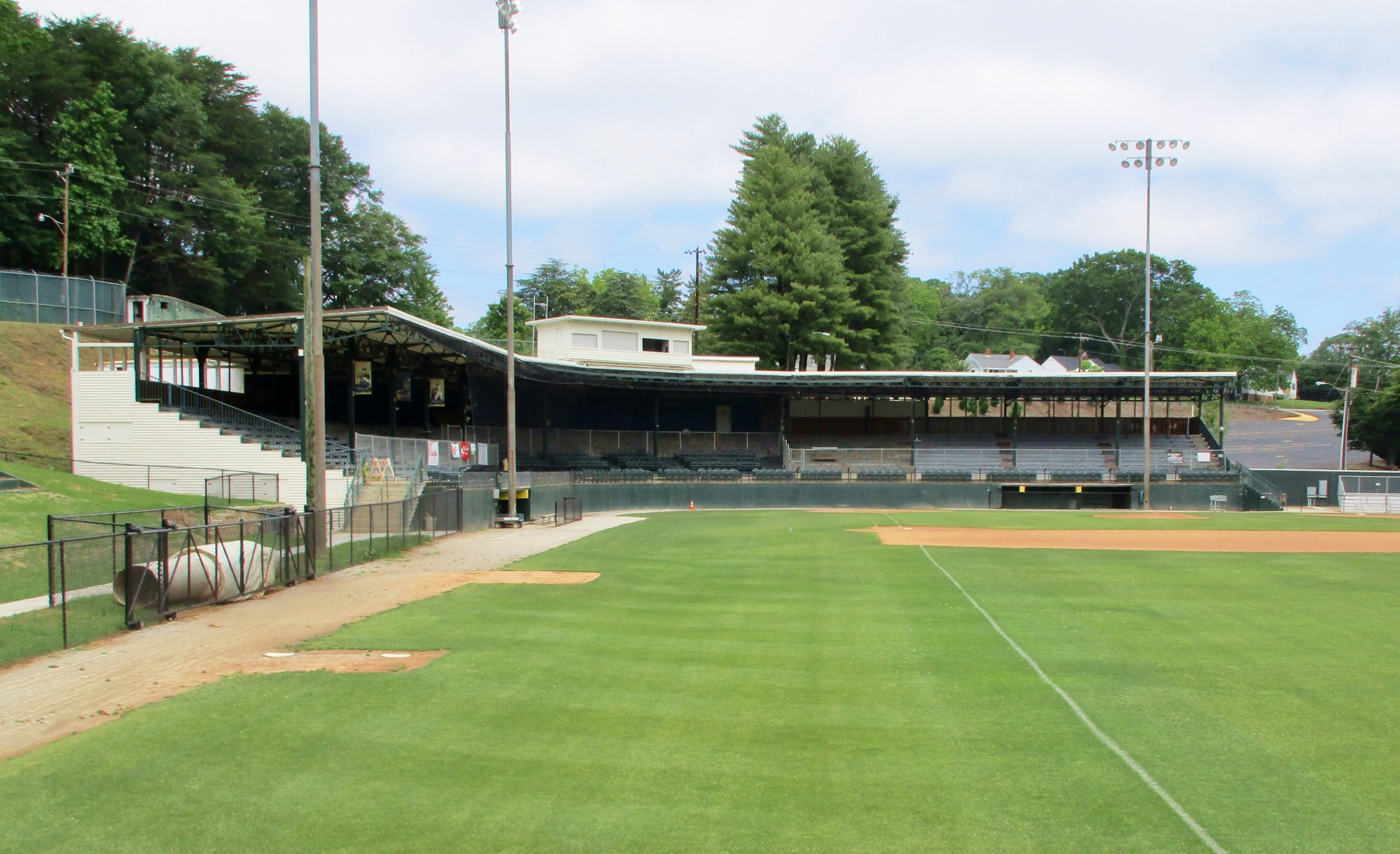
- Duncan Park baseball stadium in 2016
- Interactive map of Duncan Park Stadium
- Address: 0 West Park Drive; Spartanburg, SC 29302
- Coordinates: 34.936493°N 81.912818°W
- Owner: City of Spartanburg
- Capacity: 3,000
- Surface: Grass
- Record attendance: 21,000
- Field size: Left Field: 318 ft (97 m); Left Center: 362 ft (110 m); Center Field: 372 ft (113 m); Right Center: 368 ft (112 m); Right Field: 318 ft (97 m)

Construction
- Opened: July 8, 1926
- Renovated: 1950, 1967, 1973, 1979, 1983, 1985, 1992, 2008, 2014, 2019
- Cost: $30,946
- Architect: J. Frank Collins

Tenants
- Spartanburg Post 28 (ALB) 1926-present Spartanburg Spartans (SAL) 1926-1940; Spartanburg Sluggers (Negro league baseball) 1928-1952; Spartanburg Peaches (TSL) 1946-1955; Spartanburg Phillies (SAL) 1963-1994; Wofford Terriers (SoCon) 1996-2004; Spartanburg Crickets (SCBL) 2001-2005; Spartanburg Stingers (CPL) 2003-2006; Spartanburg High School Vikings 2008-present Spartanburgers (CPL) 2021
- Duncan Park Stadium
- U.S. National Register of Historic Places
- NRHP reference No.: 15001009
- Added to NRHP: January 26, 2016

Duncan Park is a stadium in Spartanburg, South Carolina. It is primarily used for baseball and is currently the home of the Spartanburg High School baseball team and the Spartanburg Post 28 American Legion Baseball (ALB) team. The ballpark has a capacity of 3,000 people and opened in 1926. It was listed on the National Register of Historic Places in 2016.

== History ==
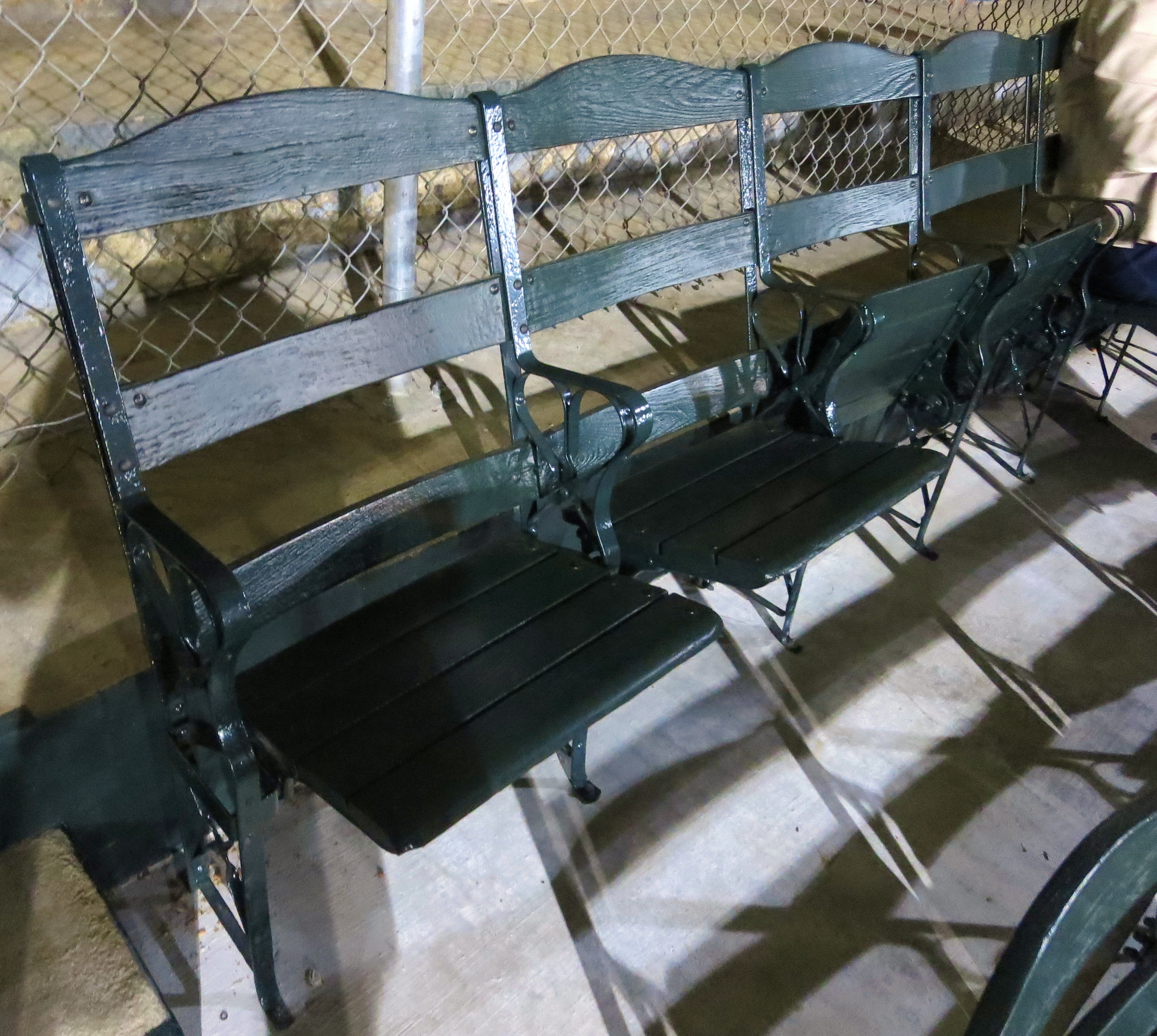
Several of the Shibe Park seats at Duncan Park Stadium

Duncan Park Stadium hosted its first game on July 8, 1926. 2,500 people watched as the Spartanburg Spartans defeated the Macon Peaches 5-1. Nearly 21,000 fans attended the deciding Game 5 of the 1936 "World Series" of American Legion baseball at Duncan Park when Spartanburg defeated Los Angeles. That figure remains the largest crowd to watch a sporting event in Spartanburg. Duncan Park also hosted the 1938 “World Series” of American Legion baseball.

In 1937, the New York Yankees, featuring Joe DiMaggio and Lou Gehrig, played an exhibition game in Duncan Park on their way to New York from spring training. Other major league standouts played in Duncan Park on their way to the show, including Larry Bowa, Ryne Sandberg, Dale Murphy, and Tom Glavine. In addition, several Negro league baseball stars also visited Duncan Park on barnstorming tours, including Hank Aaron, Satchel Paige, Larry Doby, and Jackie Robinson. When Shibe Park in Philadelphia was demolished, Duncan Park received many seats from the old stadium.

From 1996 to 2003, the park was home to the Wofford College Terriers college baseball team. In 2004, the Terriers moved to the newly built Russell C. King Field on campus. In 2008, Spartanburg city council decided to grant funding to replace the outfield wall and finalized an agreement with Spartanburg School District 7 to have the Spartanburg High School baseball team become a permanent tenant.

From 2013 to 2014, Spartanburg School District 7 spent $500,000 on significant renovations to Duncan Park Stadium. These renovations were the first major improvements since the stadium was built and involved substantial structural work. In addition, drainage was improved, rotten wood was replaced, new box seats were installed, the stadium was repainted and a new scoreboard was erected. District 7 intends to do further renovations when funds become available, including seating under the roof, concession areas and permanent restroom facilities. A further $1.6 million in renovations were done in 2018-2019, including additional locker rooms, showers, and restrooms.

In September 2020, Spartanburg City Council approved a lease agreement that brought the Spartanburgers of the Coastal Plain League to Duncan Park for the 2021 season. In March 2022, the Spartanburgers suspended operations.
