= Finch Field =

Baseball venue in Thomasville, North Carolina

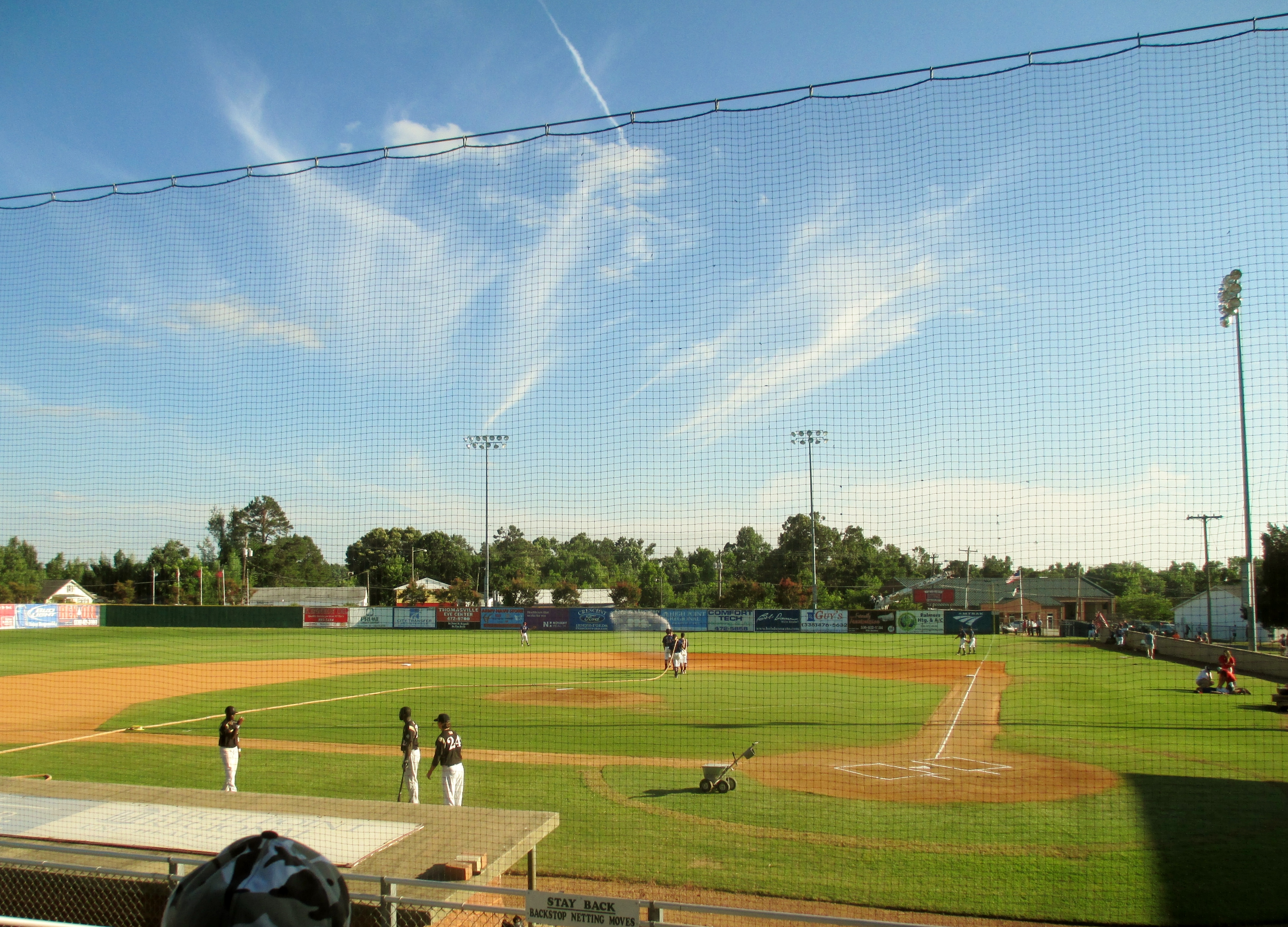
- Interactive map of Finch Field
- Full name: Historic Finch Field
- Location: Thomasville, North Carolina
- Coordinates: 35.912453°N 80.062642°W
- Owner: City of Thomasville
- Capacity: 2,000
- Scoreboard: Yes
- Field size: 325 ft., 350 ft., 390 ft., 365 ft., 330 ft.

Construction
- Built: 1935
- Renovated: 2002, 2005, 2007

Tenant
- High Point-Thomasville HiToms (Coastal Plain League) (1999-present)

Finch Field is a baseball venue in Thomasville, North Carolina, United States. It is owned and operated by the City of Thomasville and is directly managed by the Thomasville Parks and Recreation Department. It is home to the High Point-Thomasville HiToms of the Coastal Plain League, a collegiate summer baseball league. The park was built in 1935 and has been renovated in 2002, 2005, and 2007.

The park's dimensions are 325 ft. down the left field line, 350 ft. to left center, 390 ft. to dead center field, 365 ft. to right center, and 330 ft. down the right field line.

== Tenants ==
=== Current ===
The park currently hosts the Coastal Plain League's High Point-Thomasville HiToms. The High Point-Thomasville HiToms began playing at Finch Field in 1999, the same year as their inception in the league. During their time at Finch, the team has won three Coastal Plain League championships.

=== Former ===
The park has hosted numerous other professional teams since its construction in 1935. Below is a table with team names and the seasons in which they played at Finch Field.

Team	Years at Finch
Thomasville Chair Makers	1937
Thomasville Orioles	1938
Thomasville Tommies	1939–42, 1945
Thomasville Dodgers	1946–7
High Point-Thomasville Hi-Toms	1948–58, 1968
Thomasville Royals	1969

=== Other ===
In addition to professional and collegiate summer baseball, the park is home to numerous amateur baseball teams. Area American Legion baseball teams and the Thomasville High School teams both utilize the field.

== Renovations ==
In 1982, the park's original grandstand was burned down by arson. A metal seating structure was erected soon after. In 2002, the High Point-Thomasville HiToms installed new lighting and fencing. Soon after, in 2005, the 1980s seating structure was replaced with a new grandstand. Also in 2005, new dugouts and concessions were built. In 2007, a new infield was installed at the field.

A scoreboard was constructed past the left field fence was built during the 1950s and has recently been renovated.
