= Buck Hardee Field at Legion Stadium =

Baseball venue in Wilmington, North Carolina, United States

- The Shark Tank
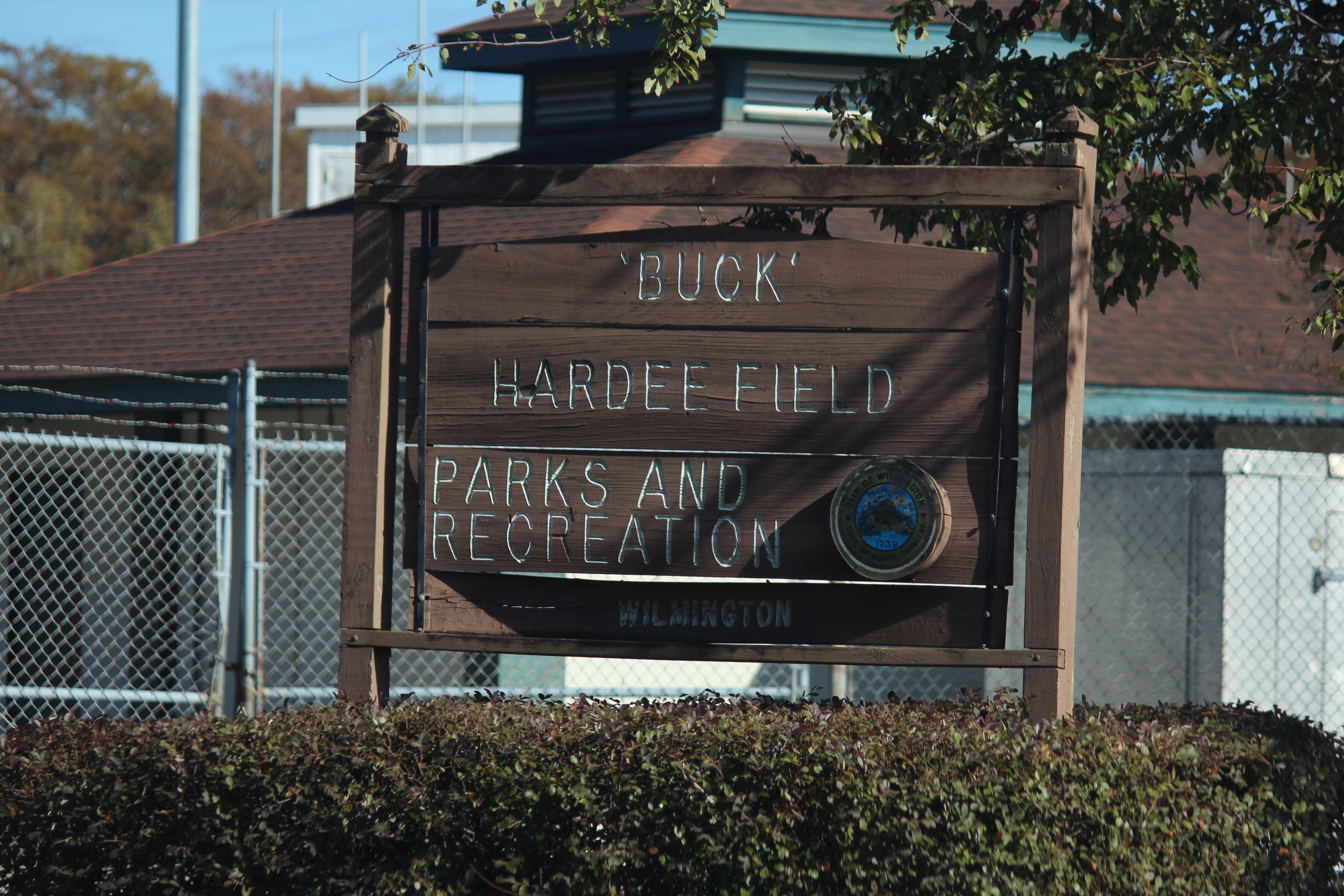
- Sign at entrance to Buck Hardee Field

- Location within North Carolina Location within the United States
- Interactive map of Buck Hardee Field at Legion Stadium
- Former names: Legion Stadium
- Address: 2149 Carolina Beach Road; Wilmington, North Carolina
- Coordinates: 34.203584°N 77.93699°W
- Capacity: 1,200 plus standing room
- Field size: Left field: 336 ft (102 m); Center field: 366 ft (112 m); Right field: 339 ft (103 m)

Tenants
- Wilmington Sharks (CPL) 1997–present Wilmington Hammerheads (PDL) 2003–2009, 2011–2016

Buck Hardee Field at Legion Stadium is a baseball venue in Wilmington, North Carolina, United States. It is home to the New Hanover High School Wildcats baseball team, as well as the Wilmington Sharks of the Coastal Plain League, a collegiate summer baseball league. The stadium, which seats 1,200 with standing room for several hundred more fans, is part of the multi-purpose sports complex known as Legion Stadium, which was also home to the Wilmington Hammerheads professional soccer team.

The baseball field's dimensions are 336 ft. down the left field line, 366 ft. to dead center field, and 339 ft. down the right field line.

The field is located at 2149 Carolina Beach Road, Wilmington, NC.

== Naming ==
On September 22, 1981, the baseball field at Legion Stadium was renamed in honor of Buck Hardee, an area American Legion baseball coach. Hardee won five American Legion state championships in his time as coach of Post 10 Legion baseball. Because it is home to the Sharks, the park is often colloquially known as "The Shark Tank."

== Renovations ==
In the summer of 2009, Coastal Plain League President Pete Bock stated his wish that the field be upgraded. Any improvements would come in addition to minor renovations by the Sharks' ownership over the past few seasons. Bock said he believed new seating would be beneficial to the park. The city of Wilmington responded with interest in minor renovations to the facility.
