= Fayetteville SwampDogs =

Minor League Baseball team

- [[File: |frameless|class=pageimage|alt=]] Logo

Information
- League: Coastal Plain League
- Location: Fayetteville, North Carolina
- Ballpark: J. P. Riddle Stadium
- Founded: 2001
- Colors: Navy blue, Columbia blue, green, tan, white
- Ownership: Lew Handelsman
- General manager: Jeremy Aagard

The Fayetteville SwampDogs were a collegiate summer baseball team that played in the Coastal Plain League. The team played its home games at J. P. Riddle Stadium, nicknamed "The Swamp", in Fayetteville, North Carolina. The SwampDogs began play in the Coastal Plain League with the 2001 season, when they finished atop the South division with a record of 18 wins and 8 losses. The SwampDogs replaced the Cape Fear Crocs at J. P. Riddle Stadium.

The team announced on October 3, 2019, that they would sit out the 2020 Coastal Plain League season and relocate afterwards, having failed to reach a new lease agreement on J. P. Riddle Stadium.

== Alumni ==
- David Aardsma (2001); pitcher, Chicago White Sox
- Mark Reynolds (2003); third Baseman, Washington Nationals
- Andy Dirks (2005); outfielder, Detroit Tigers
- Michael McKenry (2005); catcher, Pittsburgh Pirates
- Blake Gailen (2005–06); outfielder, Los Angeles Dodgers organization
- Carter Capps (2010); pitcher, Seattle Mariners
- Kevin Quackenbush (2008); pitcher, San Diego Padres
- Layne Somsen (2012); pitcher, Cincinnati Reds
- Mike Tauchman (2012); outfielder, Colorado Rockies
