= Edenton Steamers =

Coastal Plain League baseball team

- Logo

Information
- League: Tidewater Summer League
- Location: Edenton, North Carolina
- Ballpark: Historic Hicks Field
- Founded: 1998
- Petitt Cup championships: 2004, 2005, 2015
- Former league: Coastal Plain League (1998–2019)
- Colors: Teal, black and white
- Mascot: Sam & Pam the Clam
- Ownership: Frank Burke
- General manager: Tyler Russell
- Coach: Marshall McDonald

The Edenton Steamers are a collegiate summer baseball team located in Edenton, North Carolina. Beginning in 2020 they will participate in the Tidewater Summer League. 2019 was the Steamers 22nd year as a member of the Coastal Plain League where they won 11 North Division titles and 7 East Division titles, three Petitt Cup Championships, and had a league-record 14-year streak (2004–2017) of posting a winning record, having made a playoff appearance in 13 of those seasons. Edenton also established a CPL standard by winning seven consecutive division-half titles from 2011 through the first half of 2014. In 2015 the Steamers capped the summer with its third Petitt Cup Championship, tied for the league record in that tally, and was named the Summer Collegiate Team of the Year by Perfect Game CrossChecker.

Steamers players are recruited from colleges around the United States. The team's nickname and logo reflects steamed clams.

The Edenton Steamers are not affiliated or otherwise associated with the Cleveland steamer.

== CPL and the Steamers ==
The Edenton Steamers began play in the Coastal Plain League (CPL) in 1998, the league's sophomore season and were members of the CPL's North Division along with the Martinsville Mustangs, Peninsula Pilots, and Wilson Tobs.

== Steamers history ==
=== Historic Hicks Field ===
The Edenton Steamers call Historic Hicks Field home, located adjacent to John A. Holmes High School on the corner of East Freemason and Woodward streets in Edenton, North Carolina and was built as a Work Projects Administration (WPA) project in 1939.

The main structure is an all-wood grandstand with a roof that was built to accommodate slightly more than 500 people. The main grandstand is the oldest remaining wooden grandstand of its type in North Carolina.

Hicks Field was home to minor league baseball and semipro teams up until 1952, including the Edenton Colonials of the original Coastal Plain League, the Albemarle League, and the Virginia League.

The Albemarle League was well known for its baseball prominence throughout the area as collegiate players would grace locales such as Elizabeth City, Hertford, Edenton, Windsor and Williamston for a summer full of great baseball.

Hicks Field was also the longtime spring training site for a number of Minor League teams during the 1940s, including Binghamton, New York and Reading, Pennsylvania. In 1995, Hicks Field was added to the National Register of Historic Places.

Players such as Bob Feller and other Major League all-stars have set foot inside this stadium. In 1946 Hicks Field played host to one of the best games of that era as an Albemarle League all-star team faced off against a Major League all-star team composed of players from the Pittsburgh Pirates, New York Yankees, Washington Senators and Chicago White Sox. The Albemarle team was defeated but for the 4,500 in attendance they were treated to some of the best players in all of baseball.

In 1997 Hicks Field underwent extensive renovations, including a complete remodeling of the main grandstand behind home plate and the addition of two new grandstands, one down the first baseline and one down the third baseline. New bathrooms were built along with a manual wooden scoreboard that was placed above the fence in right field and a second deck was added to the left field fence to give Hicks a "Fenway Park" feel. After the renovations were complete, Hicks Field had grown in capacity to seat 1,200 people and now gives off a nostalgic feeling that can rival any major league baseball stadium.

In 1998 the Edenton Steamers were formed in the new Coastal Plain League and Hicks Field became the Steamers home ballpark. Hicks Field continues to host the Steamers, Edenton-Holmes High School baseball, and American Legion Post 40 contests, as well as various tournaments throughout the summer. Historic Hicks Field was home to the CPL All-Star game in 2001, when the North All-Stars defeated the South All-Stars 1-0, and was voted the No. 2 summer collegiate baseball venue in the nation by Baseball America (regarded as the definitive publication for the sport) in 2004. Historic Hicks Field is the smallest field in the CPL in both capacity and dimensions. It is 300 feet down the left field line, 336 feet to left-center, 350 feet to straightaway center field, 330 feet to right-center, and 298 feet along the right field line.

=== Early years and modern rebirth ===
Throughout the 1940s and 1950s, the Edenton Colonials called Hicks Field home. The Colonials played in three different leagues: the Albemarle, the Virginia, and finally the Coastal Plain League (Class D) in 1952, folding after that season.

In 1997 Pete Bock visited Edenton and during lunch he overheard talk of an old baseball field that was in disrepair but had great potential. Bock, who was commissioner of the newly formed Coastal Plain League, was actively looking for places within the Carolinas and Virginia to place new franchises. From that lunch conversation, the idea for the Edenton Steamers was born.

On May 29, 1998 the Edenton franchise opened its inaugural season securing a 7-4 victory over Rocky Mount in 11 innings. In 1998 the Steamers played a 47-game schedule and finished 14-33, placing them 6th in the Coastal Plain League. The Steamers enjoyed its first winning record the second year of operations with a 27-23 mark in 1999.

The 2000 and 2001 summer seasons were not as successful for the Steamers as their season records dropped back to 20-24 and 21-29, respectively.

The 2002 campaign started more promisingly with the Steamers winning their first North Division championship in the first half of the season. Unfortunately the second half was plagued by injuries and the Steamers struggled in the latter stages, ending 9-15 and a 24-25 record for the season. The Edenton closer that summer, Ryan Sadowski, would later go on to pitch in the Major Leagues with the San Francisco Giants in 2009 as the second Steamer alumnus to reach The Show.

2003 was a frustrating year for Steamer fans as they produced the worst win–loss record ever in Edenton history at 12-34, placing last in both halves of the season in the North Division.

=== Joel Tremblay-David Scoggin era (2004–2006) ===
The tide turned in 2004 with manager Joel Tremblay at the helm. A preview of what was in store came in the form of a 13-game winning streak to start the season, a feat that still stands as a league standard. The Steamers garnered both the first and second-half divisional titles en route to a 32-11-1 ledger and a then league-record .739 winning average. To cap off the "worst to first" turnaround, the Steamers also won the Petitt Cup Championship for the first time in franchise history, defeating arch-rival Outer Banks 13-2 in the title game. Edenton also boasted the individual ERA leader that summer in Daniel Gemma at 1.05.

With a first league championship under its belt, the momentum continued in 2005 with the return of manager Joel Tremblay. Edenton won the North Division first and second halves again and finished with a record of 34-19 for the season, the most wins ever in the CPL for a single season at the time. Edenton secured the top seed in the Petitt Cup tournament and defended its title beating Florence in the championship game by a score of 9-2 under the direction of promoted assistant coach David Scoggin, who assumed managerial duties midseason following a collegiate promotion for Tremblay. Mid-summer signee and second-half closer Joe Smith would go on to become a third-round draft selection of the New York Mets in 2006. He was the first former Steamer to appear in the Majors when he debuted for the New York Mets the following spring in 2007. Smith is currently part of the Houston Astros bullpen.

The Steamers strived to make the 2006 season a Coastal Plain League benchmark with a third consecutive championship. David Scoggin returned to lead the team to a fifth straight divisional title winning the first half of the season in the North. The five consecutive half titles was a league record until 2013 when the Steamers secured a sixth straight division title to finish the summer, en route to seven in a row following the 2014 first half. Edenton battled Peninsula in the second half for a sixth in a row but finished a game behind the Pilots. With a 34-20 tally going into the league playoffs, Edenton's run at history came to an end and the team was ousted in the first round of the tournament. This staff produced yet another closer that later reached the big leagues when Greg Holland appeared in 2010 for the Kansas City Royals, the Steamers third Major League alum, before becoming the Steamers' first Major League all-star in 2013; he repeated the feat in 2014 and 2017. Edenton's ace pitcher that summer, Evan Scribner, became the fourth alumnus to appear in the big leagues when he debuted for the San Diego Padres on April 26, 2011. Scribner has since appeared in the Oakland Athletics and Seattle Mariners bullpens, respectively, and is now a member of the Tampa Bay Rays organization.

=== Marty Smith-Jason Krug-Josh Scott era (2007–2010) ===
Edenton hired a new manager for the 2007 season named Marty Smith. With his guidance, Edenton repeated their first and second-half divisional titles. Edenton recorded the best half-season record to date in franchise history (23-5 in the second half) and won the North by six games over Peninsula, finishing with a record of 39-16. Unfortunately, Edenton was dismissed again in the first round, this time by the Martinsville Mustangs. The win total stood as the most in club history until 2011. The passing of Edenton's organizational godmother, Gayle Gieseke, in the preceding fall inspired the creation of the Gieseke Gold Award and its inaugural winner was Brian Conley. Conley became the first Steamer to win a CPL batting title (.372). Edenton also featured the league-leaders in on-base average (Conley, .472), stolen bases (Kevin Mattison, 30), and ERA (J.P. Primus, 1.22). Conley (Orioles) and Mattison (Marlins; later Brewers and Nationals) went on to become professional ballplayers; Mattison later debuted in the Majors in 2012 with Miami. Pitcher Bobby Lanigan would become the highest-drafted Steamer player ever when the Minnesota Twins selected him 92nd overall (3rd round) in 2008.

2008 saw the Steamers register another first-half North Division championship with Jason Krug as manager. The season-ending 35-20 record earned Edenton the second seed in the postseason Petitt Cup tournament. Following two consecutive first-round eliminations, Edenton advanced to the final four before bowing out in the semifinals. A Steamer hitter took home the league batting crown for the second summer in a row when Brett Nommensen fashioned a then franchise-record .377 figure; he also paced the circuit with a .462 on-base average. Closer Luke Demko led the CPL in appearances (27) and saves (15, a Steamer record) and was rewarded with the Gieseke Gold Award for that summer. Nommensen went on to be drafted and play in the Tampa Bay Rays minor league system.

Edenton welcomed back Marty Smith as manager in 2009 following some of his record-setting success in 2007 but he encountered decidedly more adversity during his second tour. For the first time since 2003 the Steamers failed to win either division-half title or eclipse 30 wins. The 29-27 regular season slate did maintain the run of successive winning seasons and saw the Teal and Black enter the postseason as the seventh of eight seeds, only to lose in the first round once more for the third time in four years. A surprising number of player casualties to professional baseball, four in the June draft and one more as a free agent at the CPL All-Star game, provided the backdrop for a great effort of over-achievement. Starting Pitcher Todd Roth took home Gieseke Gold honors; Jake Magner slugged .540 with 12 home runs to establish then franchise records in both categories; and Keith Couch (later of the Red Sox system) issued only four bases on balls in 67.2 innings pitched.

The 2010 Coastal Plain League campaign was managed by Josh Scott, who served as the 2007 pitching coach on Marty Smith's first staff. With identical 18-10 first-half marks, the Wilson Tobs defeated the Steamers in the tiebreaker contest. A 32-24 final mark put Edenton in the sixth seed for the postseason and began a run that ultimately ended in Forest City, where the top-seeded Owls won a decisive game three and the Petitt Cup. The Steamers finished as league runner-up's, but did not bring home a North Division half-championship.

2010 marked the first time in club history that a Steamer won either of the major individual seasonal awards when relief pitcher Coty Saranthus was named Rawlings Defensive Player of the Year, which is the de facto CPL Pitcher of the Year honor. Saranthus led the league, and set or tied Edenton franchise records in the first four categories, in ERA (0.68), WHIP (0.51), batting average against (.107), wins (7), and appearances (30). For the third time in four years, the CPL batting title went to a Steamer hitter when shortstop A.J. Rusbarsky ended the regular season at .345; he also led the league in hits (69), sacrifice bunts (19), and assists (180), the latter two are also both franchise records in Edenton. He capped this remarkable performance by winning the first Goodman Glove Award for defensive excellence in a Steamers uniform. It is named in honor of the late Livy Goodman, a leader for many years on the Steamers ownership board who also organized the Clambake events, an annual mid-winter fundraiser for the team. Gieseke Gold Award winner Brian Billigen led the league and set a Steamer record with five triples. His status as the top five-tool talent (bat, power, speed, defense, arm) to that point in franchise history was on display nightly and was later illuminated when he was named a 2010 CPL Top Ten Prospect by both Baseball America and Perfect Game CrossChecker. Brian Blasik scored the most runs in the CPL (39) helped by his then club-record 15 doubles, while Mark Montgomery set the then all-time league best for strikeout ratio by a reliever (1.93 K/IP) when he fanned 54 in 28 innings. Montgomery was drafted by the New York Yankees the next year and raced through their minor league system, followed by a year (2017) in the Cardinals organization and now finds himself in the Detroit Tigers system.

=== Dirk Kinney-Stephen "Mo" Moritz era (2011–2012) ===
In 2011 the Steamers concluded its most successful regular season in modern history. That summer saw the Steamers break 13 franchise records, including setting six different Coastal Plain League marks, send six representatives to the All-Star festivities, clinch both first and second-half North Division titles, earn the top seed in the Petitt Cup Playoffs, and hold the ranking of No. 1 summer collegiate team in the nation for five straight weeks according to Perfect Game CrossChecker. The Steamers set new franchise standards for wins, with 44, and an .800 winning percentage for the regular season. They slugged .399 and had an OPS of .787 to go along with 12 triples as a team. They set team marks in total bases with 756, stolen bases at 131, and held opposing hitters to their lowest batting average against ever at .210. To go along with the eight new franchise team records, the Steamers established six CPL marks during 2011. Those included consecutive winning seasons and playoff appearances, with their eighth in a row, and wins in a half with a 25-3 mark in the second half of the CPL season. They also set a new CPL record for on-base percentage as a team at .388, runs scored with 370, RBI with 322, and bases on balls with 280. The Steamers finished the 2011 campaign ranked seventh in the nation, according to Perfect Game CrossChecker.

On the individual level, Joey Wendle had one of the most impressive seasons in franchise history. He set a new record for hits in a single season in the CPL with 81, along with establishing a franchise-best for assists by a second baseman with 158, and he tied the franchise mark for batting average in a season at .377. The lefty hitter also had a 21-game hitting streak and a 36-game on-base streak, as well as being named to the 2011 CPL National All-Star team. Wendle was the 2011 recipient of the Gieseke Gold Award and concluded his summer honors by being named a Perfect Game CrossChecker Summer All-American at second base and a 2011 CPL Top Ten Prospect by Baseball America. Ryan Brenner set the franchise mark for stolen bases in a season, with 35, and putouts by an outfielder with 124. Brenner was awarded the second annual Goodman Glove Award. Coach Kinney capped his season off by being named the 2011 CPL Coach of the Year after leading his Steamers to a 49-14 overall mark and making a run to the Petitt Cup Championship series.

The Edenton Steamers celebrated their 15th year as members of the Coastal Plain League with another outstanding season in 2012. Piggybacking on the success from the previous summer, Steve "Mo" Moritz, who served as hitting coach in 2011 under Dirk Kinney, was hired on to lead the charge in 2012. On the way to finishing as the top seed for the CPL Petitt Cup Playoffs with a 36-17 record, the Steamers tied or broke 10 franchise marks, received the CPL Rawlings Hitter of the Week selection three times, sent a league-high six players to the All-Star festivities and clinched both first and second-half East Division titles (The CPL realigned its divisions in the offseason from 2011 to 2012 and Edenton was moved to the East Division. The new alignment dropped the North and South divisions in favor of an East-West format with seven teams in each division). By clinching the two half-division titles in 2012, Edenton had then won four half-division titles in a row dating back to 2011 and had 13 in franchise history. Edenton also spent the entire summer ranked in the top 30 in the nation of summer-collegiate teams according to Perfect Game CrossChecker and four straight weeks in the top ten before settling in at 15th in the final poll.

The Steamers set new team standards in home runs with 44, slugging average at .423 and OPS at .791; their 100 doubles tied the franchise mark from 2010 and they increased their CPL-leading streak to nine straight years with a winning record and a playoff appearance. Edenton also wrapped up as the league leader in several categories, including batting average (.280), runs (302), RBIs (266), and home runs (44).

Individually, Michael Camporeale led the offensive charge setting new team marks in slugging (.623) and doubles (19). He finished as the league leader in doubles, RBIs (42), total bases (101) and tied for the lead in home runs with nine en route to winning Coastal Plain League Hitter of the Year. He was an All-Star selection, as well as a CPL Rawlings Hitter of the Week for Edenton. Koby Kraemer set a new franchise OPS mark (1.050) while finishing second in the league with a .371 batting average and receiving All-Star recognition. Madison Beaird became the franchise-record holder for assists by an outfielder, throwing out 11 men on the base paths and was the 2012 recipient of the Goodman Glove Award. Jordan Egan, a returner from the 2011 squad, tied the single-season team record for saves with 15 and became just the second two-time All-Star in Steamer history when he was selected that season. Egan was honored as the 2012 Gieseke Gold Award winner. Jason Kanzler ended his summer ranked in the top five in the league in runs (38), triples (4), home runs (8), total bases (95) and stolen bases (21). He was a CPL Rawlings Hitter of the Week and an All-Star. Wes Meadows logged substantial time behind the plate, as well as in the infield for the Steamers down the stretch, and earned CPL Rawlings Hitter of the Week honors, as well as the inaugural Katy Ebersole Heart and Soul Award, given to the Steamer player who best exemplifies the "heart and soul" of the team. Head coach Steve Moritz made it two in a row for Edenton skippers when he garnered CPL Coach of the Year honors.

=== Bryan Hill era (2013–2016) ===
In 2013 Edenton wrapped up another successful campaign on the diamond. Their 16th season in the CPL saw the Steamers complete their 10th consecutive campaign with a winning record and a playoff appearance, a league record. Along the way Edenton finished 40-11 overall, clinched both first and second-half East Division titles and entered the Petitt Cup Playoffs as the top overall seed for the third consecutive year. The two half-division titles gave Edenton six straight, also a league mark, and 15 in franchise history. Four Clams were selected as the Rawlings Player of the Week and a league-high eight Steamers received All-Star nods. Edenton once again spent the entire summer in the top-five of the summer-collegiate rankings by Perfect Game Crosschecker, peaking at number three overall and finishing up the summer ranked sixth in the nation, the highest final designation in franchise history.

The record books continued to be rewritten by the Teal and Black in 2013 as the Steamers tied or broke 14 franchise records both on the individual level as well as the team level. Along with their 10th straight winning season, playoff appearance and six straight half-division titles, Edenton set a new league mark with a .975 fielding average and tied their team WHIP mark at 1.10. The Clams as a team finished in the top five in the league in batting average (.261), slugging average (.399), OBP (.357), runs (286), hits (431), RBIs (258), doubles (81), triples (9), home runs (43), total bases (659), walks (207) and sacrifice flies (16).

On the individual level, the Steamers' Nick Miller earned an All-Star nod and was a CPL Rawlings Pitcher of the Week selection, as well as setting a new team standard for ERA by a starting pitcher at 1.02 and fielding average for a first baseman at a perfect 1.000. Miller was awarded the Gieseke Gold Award at season's end as the most outstanding player and person in 2013. Third baseman Josh Hampton led the league in RBIs (42), tied for first with four triples, second in home runs (9) and set a new Steamer record with 123 assists at third base. Hampton was the CPL Rawlings Hitter of the Week for week one of the season and brought home an All-Star selection, as well as being honored with the Goodman Glove Award. Nick Thompson paced the league in runs (42) and his 41 free passes set a new Steamer season mark. Thompson led the league in slugging (.594), second in OBP (.471) and, along with the walks, set a new franchise record with a 1.065 OPS, which also led the CPL. The infielder/outfielder earned an All-star selection and the Ebersole Heart and Soul Award at summer's end, given to the person who most exhibits the "heart and soul" of the club throughout the summer. Trent Miller led the club and finished second in the league with a .347 batting average, his .540 slugging average and seven home runs were good for fifth in the CPL and he was selected to the All-Star squad, as well as earning a CPL Rawlings Hitter of the Week award. Adam Kirsch led the league and set a new Steamer standard with 22 doubles, was selected as an All-Star and was the winner of the CPL All-Star hitting challenge, the first Steamer ever to do so. Jake McCoy, the hard-throwing closer, tied the Steamers franchise record with seven wins and led all CPL closers with 11 saves during the summer. His work on the mound netted him a 2013 All-Star selection. Jacob Reese excelled defensively for the Teal and Black, tying the franchise mark for fielding average at the position at .995 and earning an All-Star nod. Right-handed pitcher Jeremy Bales proved to be one of the most reliable Steamer relief pitchers; he logged 19.1 innings on the mound and allowed just one earned run, good for a 0.47 ERA, tying a Steamer mark. Steamers head Coach Bryan Hill became the third Steamer skipper in a row and fourth overall to bring home the CPL Coach of the Year award at season's end.

In 2014 the Edenton Steamers wrapped up their 17th season as members of the Coastal Plain League and their 11th straight campaign with a winning record and a playoff appearance, a CPL record. Along the way in 2014, Edenton also clinched its seventh consecutive division-half title when they wrapped up the first-half East Division championship, also a league record. They broke or tied six franchise records, including tying the team mark for saves with 20 (2005, 2011), had three players earn 919 Marketing Player of the Week honors, and five players along with head coach Bryan Hill named to the East All-Star team. The Steamers also celebrated 19 players with ties to the organization that entered professional baseball in 2014, the most ever from Edenton in a single pro-entry class. On an individual level – Josh Roeder, Gunnar Kines, Ryan Raslowsky, Orlando Olivera, Evan Rogers and Jake Placzek all had sustained success for Edenton in 2014.

Roeder, a junior closer from the University of Nebraska, was lights out for the Steamers in 2014. He made 21 appearances, recording 14 saves and finishing with a 1.71 ERA. In 21 innings on the mound he allowed just 17 hits and four earned runs while striking out 38 and holding opposing hitters to a .224 batting average. Roeder was named the 919 Marketing Pitcher of the Week for week four of action, as well as a midseason and first-team postseason All-Star. At summer's end he was ranked as the number-two prospect in the CPL by Baseball America and number three by Perfect Game CrossChecker. He was drafted into the New York Yankees organization in 2015 and remains a member of their minor-league system.

Kines excelled for the Steamers on the mound that summer, wrapping up his season with a 6-2 mark and logging 50.0 innings of work. The junior from the University of Mount Olive was the league leader in ERA at 1.26 and had 56 strikeouts, which was fourth in the circuit, along with only allowing 34 hits and seven earned runs all summer, good for a .192 batting average against. He was named a midseason All-Star and a first-team postseason All-Star for Edenton, as well as a first-team Summer All-American by Perfect Game CrossChecker. He was drafted the next year, 2015, by the Florida Marlins and has since pitched in the New York Mets system, as well as the independent Frontier League.

A junior infielder from California State University-Northridge, Raslowsky finished as the team leader with a .369 batting average in 37 games for the Teal and Black. He ended tied with Olivera for tops on the team with 55 hits and added five doubles and two triples for a .430 slugging average. He drove in 21, scored 26 times and notched 64 total bases along with 12 bases on balls and struck out just 17 times in 149 at-bats. He stole 24 bases in 26 attempts and boasted a .435 on-base average. Raslowsky earned the 919 Marketing Hitter of the Week award for week six of action and was also named a midseason and first-team postseason All-Star. "Raz," as he was affectionately known, was named Edenton's Gieseke Gold Award winner for 2014, which recognizes the player who contributes the most on and off the field each summer.

Olivera, a junior outfielder and first baseman from Missouri Baptist University, finished second on the Steamers with a .325 batting average and tied for first on the team having played in 45 games. He scored 25 runs and finished tied for first in hits (55) and home runs (six) while adding four doubles, 30 RBIs, a .396 on-base average and a team-leading 77 total bases and .456 slugging average. He was selected to participate in the annual All-Star Home Run Derby contest, named a midseason All-Star and a second-team postseason All-Star for Edenton. He was drafted the next year in 2015 by the St. Louis Cardinals.

A sophomore infielder, Rogers etched his name in Edenton's franchise record book by setting the fielding average standard for a shortstop throughout the summer. In 172 chances he committed only 7 errors, good for a .956 fielding average. Along with his slick fielding he hit .276 in 45 games for Edenton, he led the team with 31 runs, was second on the team with 43 hits, added seven doubles, a home run and his 33 walks were good for second behind only Placzek. He also posted a .408 on-base average, swiped 17 bases in 21 attempts and was awarded with a midseason All-Star nod. Rogers took home Goodman Glove Award honors, which recognizes the most valuable defensive player each summer in an Edenton uniform.

A sophomore infielder from the University of Nebraska, Placzek hit .211 in 35 games for the Steamers this summer and set a new franchise record by drawing 47 walks, which also led the league. He scored 27 runs, added five doubles and a home run, knocking in 15; he went 12 for 13 in stolen bases and finished second in the league with a .448 on-base figure.

The third annual Katy Ebersole Heart & Soul Award went to right-handed starter Manny Arciniega out of Peru State College. Arciniega was the only Steamer to start and end the campaign in the Edenton rotation, pitching impressively along the way. Overall, he made 10 appearances, eight starts and paced the staff with 54.0 innings pitched, finishing with a 5-2 ledger, 3.00 ERA, .96 WHIP and .204 opponent batting average with 45 strikeouts to only 12 walks. Arciniega has gone on to a still-active career pitching at the independent-league level, currently with the Lake Erie Crushers of the Frontier League.

Reigning CPL Coach of the Year Bryan Hill navigated the Steamers to a 21-7 first-half record and a seventh straight East Division title. Hill was also named the head coach of the East All-Star squad for the second consecutive year, as well as the debut CPL Select squad where Kines, Olivera and Raslowsky joined him against Team USA in a scouting-exhibition contest. Hill guided the Clams to a 36-16 final record, finishing as the number-two seed in the East heading into the Petitt Cup playoffs.

== Championships ==
- 2002 North Division 1st Half Champions
- 2004 North Division 1st and 2nd Half Champions
- 2004 Coastal Plain League Champions
- 2005 North Division 1st and 2nd Half Champions
- 2005 Coastal Plain League Champions
- 2006 North Division 1st Half Champions
- 2007 North Division 1st and 2nd Half Champions
- 2008 North Division 1st Half Champions
- 2010 Coastal Plain League runner-up
- 2011 North Division 1st and 2nd Half Champions
- 2011 Coastal Plain League runner-up
- 2012 East Division 1st and 2nd Half Champions
- 2013 East Division 1st and 2nd Half Champions
- 2014 East Division 1st Half Champions
- 2015 East Division 1st and 2nd Half Champions
- 2015 Coastal Plain League Champions

== Alumni (current professional players) ==
Major League alumni (all-time):

- Joe Smith, pitcher 2006 3rd Rd. New York Mets (2006–2008), Cleveland Indians (2009–2013), Los Angeles Angels of Anaheim (2014–2016), Chicago Cubs (2016), Toronto Blue Jays (2017), Houston Astros (2018–present)
- Ryan Sadowski, pitcher 2003 12th Rd. San Francisco Giants (2009)
- Greg Holland, pitcher 2007 10th Rd. Kansas City Royals (2010–present), Colorado Rockies (2017)
- Evan Scribner, pitcher 2007 28th Rd. Arizona Diamondbacks; San Diego Padres (2011), Oakland Athletics (2012–2015), Seattle Mariners (2016–present), Tampa Bay Rays (2018–present)
- Kevin Mattison, outfielder 2008 28th Rd. Florida Marlins; Miami Marlins (2012)
- Justin Freeman, pitcher 2008 32nd Rd. Cincinnati Reds (2013)
- Vidal Nuño, pitcher 2009 48th Rd. Cleveland Indians; New York Yankees (2013–2014), Arizona Diamondbacks (2014–2015), Seattle Mariners (2015–2016), Los Angeles Dodgers (2017), Baltimore Orioles (2017), Tampa Bay Rays (2018–present)
- Billy Burns, outfielder 2011 32nd Rd. Washington Nationals; Oakland Athletics (2014–2016), Kansas City Royals (2016–present)
- Chris Bassitt, pitcher 2011 16th Rd. Chicago White Sox (2014); Oakland Athletics (2015–present)
- Ken Roberts, pitcher 2010 25th Rd. Colorado Rockies (2015), Philadelphia Phillies (2015)
- Joey Wendle, infielder 2012 6th Rd. Cleveland Indians; Oakland Athletics (2016–present), Tampa Bay Rays (2018–2021), Miami Marlins (2022–present)
- Kevin McCarthy, pitcher 2013 16th Rd. Kansas City Royals (2016–present)
- Troy Scribner, pitcher 2013 post-draft free agent. Houston Astros; Los Angeles Angels of Anaheim (2017–present)

Minor League alumni (current):

- Mark Montgomery, pitcher 2011 11th Rd. New York Yankees; currently in the Detroit Tigers system
- Josh Fuentes, infielder 2014 post-draft free agent Colorado Rockies
- Jeremy Walker, pitcher 2016 5th Rd. Atlanta Braves
- Matt Festa, pitcher 2016 7th Rd. Seattle Mariners
- David Bednar, pitcher 2016 35th Rd. San Diego Padres
- Randy Dobnak, pitcher 2017 independent-league free agent. Minnesota Twins
- Jake Cousins, pitcher 2017 20th Rd. Washington Nationals
- John Russell, pitcher 2017 16th Rd. San Francisco Giants
