= High Point-Thomasville HiToms =

Coastal Plain League baseball team

- Logo

Information
- League: Coastal Plain League (West)
- Location: Thomasville, North Carolina
- Ballpark: Historic Finch Field
- Founded: 1937, 1999 – amateur franchise
- League championships: 2006, 2007, 2008
- Colors: Scarlet and Navy Blue
- Mascot: TomKat
- Ownership: Greg Suire
- Management: Greg Suire (President)
- Manager: Scott Davis
- Website: https://www.hitoms.com/

The High Point-Thomasville HiToms are a baseball team in the Coastal Plain League, a collegiate summer baseball league. The HiToms plays its home games at Historic Finch Field in Thomasville, North Carolina. The HiToms were one of the earlier teams to compete in the Coastal Plain League and started competing during the 1999 season. During their inaugural season, the team composed a record of 21 wins and 26 losses. The HiToms currently play in the West Division of the CPL, and are three-time Coastal Plain League Petitt Cup Champions.

== History ==
The team's name dates back to a team that was shared by the High Point and Thomasville communities in the Carolina League (1954–1958, 1968). The HiToms won the Carolina League championship in 1968. The following year they changed their name to the High Point-Thomasville Royals for one campaign.

The High Point-Thomasville HiToms are the first team in CPL history to win the league championship three years in a row (2006, 2007, 2008).

== Alumni ==
- Todd Wellemeyer (1999), pitcher, Chicago Cubs (2003–2005), Florida Marlins (2006), Kansas City Royals (2006–2007), St. Louis Cardinals (2007–2009), San Francisco Giants (2010)
- Bobby Parnell (2003), pitcher, New York Mets (2008–present)

Nicky Lopez, 2014 (Kansas City Royals 2019 - present)

- Zack Gelof, third baseman, Oakland A's
