= Gastonia Grizzlies =

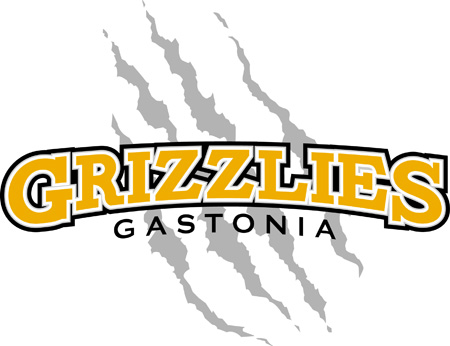

Information
- League: Coastal Plain League (West)
- Location: Gastonia, North Carolina
- Ballpark: Sims Legion Park
- Founded: 2002
- Folded: 2020
- League championships: 2011; 2017
- Colors: Black, Gold, White, Purple
- Ownership: Jesse Cole
- Manager: Charles Bradley

The Gastonia Grizzlies were a collegiate summer baseball team playing in the Coastal Plain League. The team played its home games at Sims Legion Park in Gastonia, North Carolina, where they were known for their unique promotional events and fireworks shows. It was reported in October 2020 that the team was moving to Spartanburg, South Carolina starting with the 2021 season. The team's new name was announced as the Spartanburgers.

== Home field ==
The Grizzlies played all their seasons at Sims Legion Park, from 2002 to 2020. A new ballpark was built in Gastonia in the team's final years, but it was not guaranteed to be a new home for the Grizzlies. City officials favored a partnership which brought an Atlantic League expansion team to the new ballpark. Grizzlies ownership said they would not share the stadium.

== Midnight Madness ==
The inaugural Midnight Madness game took place on July 9, 2010 against the Forest City Owls. The first pitch was at midnight with festivities before the game including bed races, eating contests, players in the dunk tank, home run derby and a live band in the Beer Garden. The game drew 3,150 fans with the last fan entering the ballpark at 1:39 am. The game won best promotion at 2010 Summer Ball Conference. The 2011 Midnight Madness was even a bigger success drawing more fans than the previous year.

== 2014 season ==
2014 was the most successful season in the Grizzlies thirteen-year history, both on the field and off the field. The Grizzlies drew just under 60,000 fans, breaking the previous attendance record that has been set for four straight years The Grizzlies also set the single game attendance record with 4,381 fans; along with two other games over 4,000 fans.

== Awards ==
Prior to the 2014 season, the Gastonia Grizzlies were named The Gaston Gazette "Person of the Year". Normally the award goes to an individual but the Grizzlies continued community impact helped earn them the honor.

The Coastal Plain League congratulated the Grizzlies with the title of Organization of the Year in 2012.

The Grizzlies also received multiple Promotion of the Year awards at the National Summer League Conference.

== CPL Champions ==
The 2011 Grizzlies entered the CPL playoffs as the 6 seed and went on to upset the #3 seed Thomasville Hitoms, the #4 seed Forest City Owls in the Semifinals and the #1 seed in the nation the Edenton Steamers to win the Pettit Cup Championship. Michael Heesch was named Rawlings Defensive Player of the Year by finishing the season at 9-0 including three shutouts in the CPL playoffs. Heesch in addition to RHP Derek Epps were named to the Perfect Game Summer Ball All American Team. The Grizzlies finished the year as the #30 ranked team in the country by Perfect Game.

== Attendance ==
The Grizzlies broke their own attendance record for 10 straight seasons. The team averaged 2,053 fans per game for the season. The team's single game attendance record was set on May 31, 2014, with 4,381 fans. The Grizzlies would go on to sell out two other games in 2014.

=== Highest single-season attendance figures ===
Season	Total Att.	Openings	Game Average
2014	59,543	29	2,053
2013	57,023	26	2,193
2012	59,399	29	2,048
2011	51,910	27	1,848
2010	42,758	27	1,574
