= Lexington County Blowfish =

Coastal Plain League baseball team

- Logo

Information
- League: Coastal Plain League (West)
- Location: Lexington, South Carolina
- Ballpark: Lexington County Baseball Stadium
- Founded: 2006
- League championships: 2 (2012, 2023)
- Former name: Columbia Blowfish
- Former ballpark: Capital City Stadium
- Colors: Navy Blue, Lake Murray Blue, Crimson Red and White
- Mascot: Blowie the Blowfish
- Ownership: Bill & Vicki Shanahan
- President: Bill Shanahan
- Manager: Michael Menhart
- Website: goblowfishbaseball.com

The Lexington County Blowfish are a summer collegiate baseball team in the Coastal Plain League (CPL). The team plays its home games at Lexington County Baseball Stadium in unincorporated Lexington County, South Carolina (with an address in the town of Lexington). The Blowfish first started competing in the CPL during the 2006 season. During their first year in existence, the Blowfish led the CPL in attendance and was voted the CPL Organization of the Year.

The Blowfish are known for their family-friendly fun at the ballpark and in the community led by Master of Ceremonies George Dinsmore since 2018. The organization offers all-you-can-eat ticket plans (including 5-game, 10-game and 15-game options), packaged with the team’s top theme nights and fireworks shows.

Lexington County has been named the CPL Organization of the Year four times (2023, 2022, 2015, 2006). The Blowfish also won the league's Petitt Cup in 2012 and 2023.

The Blowfish promoted former Blowfish player and two-time Coast Plain league All-Star Zach Cowart to head coach prior to the 2027 season.

The front office consists of team Co-owners Bill & Vicki Shanahan, General Manager Tony Baldwin and Assistant General Manager Joey Norris.

The Blowfish replaced the Capital City Bombers when professional baseball left Columbia after the 2004 season. The Blowfish moved from Columbia to Lexington County in 2014. The team is named after popular South Carolina band Hootie and the Blowfish.

== Columbia area baseball history ==
Since 1892 Columbia has fielded teams in various minor leagues, including:

- Columbia Senators-1892-South Atlantic League
- Columbia Skyscrapers-1904-South Atlantic League
- Columbia Gamecocks-1905-1910-South Atlantic League
- Columbia Commies-1911-South Atlantic League
- Columbia Comers-1912, 1914-1917, 1919-1923, 1925-1930-South Atlantic League
- Columbia Sandlappers-1934-Piedmont League
- Columbia Senators-1936-1937-South Atlantic League
- Columbia Reds-1938-1941, 1946-1954, 1960-1961-South Atlantic League
- Columbia Gems-1955-1959-South Atlantic League
- Columbia Mets-1983-1992-South Atlantic League
- Capital City Bombers-1993-2004-South Atlantic League
- Columbia Fireflies- 2016–2020-South Atlantic League, 2021-present-Low-A East

Summer college teams:

- Columbia Blowfish-2006-2014-Coastal Plain League

The Blowfish hosted the 2007, 2018, and 2023 Coastal Plain League All-Star Games.

== Blowfish in MLB ==
=== Blowfish alumni ===
Eleven former Blowfish have played Major League Baseball:

- Michael Kohn
- Ryan Garton
- Tyler Webb
- C.D. Pelham
- Taylor Widener
- Wil Crowe
- Chas McCormick
- Charlie Barnes
- JP Sears
- Cody Morris
- TJ Hopkins
