= Wilmington Sharks =

Coastal Plain League baseball team

- Logo

Information
- League: Coastal Plain League (East)
- Location: Wilmington, North Carolina
- Ballpark: Buck Hardee Field at Legion Stadium
- Founded: 1997
- Nickname(s): Shaaarks, Sharks
- CPL championships: 1998, 1999, 2024, 2026
- East Division championships: 2017, 2023, 2024, 2026
- Colors: Navy, Light Blue, and White
- Mascot: Sharky the Shark
- Ownership: Andrew Lissak
- Manager: Russ Burroughs
- Website: Official website

The Wilmington Sharks are an American collegiate summer baseball team based in Wilmington, North Carolina. The Sharks compete in the East Division of the Coastal Plain League (CPL) and play their home games at Buck Hardee Field at Legion Stadium, commonly known as "The Shark Tank."

Founded in 1997 as one of the original members of the Coastal Plain League, Wilmington has won four league championships, the most in CPL history. The Sharks won consecutive championships in 1998 and 1999 before winning Petitt Cup championships in 2024 and 2026. The 2024 title was Wilmington's first league championship in 25 years, while the 2026 championship gave the Sharks two titles in a three-year span.

The Sharks have also developed a pipeline of players who have advanced to professional baseball. At least 18 former Wilmington players have reached Major League Baseball, including MLB All-Star Alec Bohm, while numerous other Sharks alumni have been selected in the MLB Draft or signed professional contracts.

Wilmington was named the Coastal Plain League Organization of the Year in 2019. The Sharks won three East Division championships in a four-year span, in 2023, 2024 and 2026, advancing to the Petitt Cup Championship Series in each of those seasons and winning league championships in 2024 and 2026. Following the 2026 championship season, field manager Russ Burroughs was named the Coastal Plain League Coach of the Year.

Andrew Lissak became owner of the Wilmington Sharks in 2026.

Sharky, an anthropomorphic gray shark, is the team's mascot.

== Recent seasons ==
In the 2026 season, the Sharks finished the regular season with a 32–14 record and a .696 winning percentage, the second-best regular-season record in the Coastal Plain League. Wilmington earned the No. 2 seed in the East Division playoffs and defeated the Holly Springs Salamanders, 9–1, in the wild card round before sweeping the top-seeded Morehead City Marlins to win the East Division championship and advance to the Petitt Cup Championship Series for the third time in four seasons.

After losing Game 1 of the championship series to the Macon Bacon, Wilmington rallied from a six-run deficit in Game 2 to win 8–7 in 12 innings and force a deciding third game. The Sharks won Game 3, 11–0, to capture the 2026 Petitt Cup Championship, the franchise’s second league championship in three seasons and fourth overall. Wilmington finished the season with a 37–15 overall record, including the postseason, setting a franchise record for total wins in a single season. Manager Russ Burroughs was named the 2026 Coastal Plain League Coach of the Year.

In the 2025 season, the Sharks finished with a 25–20 record and earned the No. 3 seed in the East Division. Wilmington qualified for the postseason for the third consecutive season and traveled to face the second-seeded Wilson Tobs in the East Division semifinal. The Sharks lost 8–4 to Wilson, ending their season. The Tobs went on to win the 2025 Coastal Plain League championship.

In the 2024 season, the Sharks finished with a 30–19 record and made the postseason due to second best overall record in the East Division after the Peninsula Pilots won both the first and second halves. Wilmington swept the three-game series against the Pilots to win the East Division championship for the fifth time in franchise history and in the second consecutive season. The Sharks faced the Lexington County Blowfish in the 2024 Petitt Cup Championship for the second straight year, sweeping the team two games to none. It was the Sharks first championship in the Petitt Cup era. Sharks pitching had a 1.50 ERA in the playoffs.

The 2023 season, the Sharks finished with a 24–21 record and was crowned the East Division Champions. The Sharks lost in the Petitt Cup Championship in the final game of the series to the Lexington Blowfish. The Sharks bolstered an impressive 19–6 home record as the Shark Tank provides one of the most unique atmospheres in the league. Wilmington maintained an average attendance of 1,500 - the second highest in The Coastal Plain League that year.

In the 2022 season, the Sharks barely missed the playoffs by three games and finished in 6th place. Their average attendance rose to 1,500.

For the 2021 season, the Sharks finished with a 23–19 record. They had their first winning season since 2017. Sharks finished the season in 6th place and their average attendance was 1,200.

2020 season, the CPL had planned to return to a two-division format, placing the Sharks in the East Division. The 2020 season was originally slated to begin on May 28. Due to COVID-19 restrictions, CPL postponed its opening day to July 1. In response to the pandemic and the attendant restrictions, the Sharks opted not to play the 2020 season. (The CPL played a shortened season.) The Sharks returned to the CPL in the 2021 season, in the East Division.

== Coaching staff ==
Russ Burroughs completed his sixth season as manager of the Wilmington Sharks in 2026 and is the winningest manager in franchise history. During his tenure, Wilmington has won three East Division championships, in 2023, 2024 and 2026, and advanced to the Petitt Cup Championship Series in each of those seasons. The Sharks won the Coastal Plain League championship in 2024 and 2026, giving the organization two league titles in a three-year span. During the 2026 season, the Sharks finished the regular season 32–14 before going 5–1 in the postseason and defeating the Macon Bacon in the Petitt Cup Championship Series. Wilmington finished 37–15 overall. Burroughs recorded his 200th career victory as a summer collegiate head coach and was named the 2026 Coastal Plain League Coach of the Year.

Wilmington returned to the postseason in 2023 for the first time since 2017 and won the East Division championship before finishing as the Petitt Cup runner-up. The following season, Wilmington again won the East Division and captured the 2024 Petitt Cup championship, the organization's first league championship since 1999. During Burroughs's tenure, the Sharks' pitching staffs have regularly ranked among the CPL leaders in categories including ERA, WHIP, runs allowed and batting average against.

Burroughs has also coached players who have gone on to sign professional contracts and compete in events including the College World Series and World Baseball Classic. Players coached during his tenure have also received numerous All-CPL selections.

Before joining Wilmington, Burroughs spent three seasons with the Edenton Steamers, then a member of the Coastal Plain League. He served as an assistant coach in 2017 before becoming head coach for the 2018 and 2019 seasons. Prior to coaching, Burroughs played four seasons of professional baseball, including three seasons in independent baseball and one season internationally. Primarily a pitcher, he was used as a spot starter and left-handed reliever and also appeared as a designated hitter.

During the offseason, Burroughs serves as Head Baseball Instructor at Nashville Baseball Academy and works with Sidearm Nation as a specialty instructor. He graduated from Lipscomb University in 2009 with a bachelor's degree in mass communications.

Austin Skipper joins the Sharks as an assistant coach, but he is no stranger to the organization. A Wilmington, NC native Skipper pitched consequently for the Sharks from 2018 to 2023. He played under Manager Russ Burroughs for the past three seasons. Skipper attended William Peace University where he was a 4-year starter and won All-Conference Honors in 2021. With two years of eligibility left he then attended Methodist University where he was voted team captain for the 2023 season. Skipper received his MBA in Business Administration at Methodist University all while achieving scholar athlete honors.

Adam Cardin returns to the Sharks in 2024 after serving as an assistant in 2023. He has coached within the CPL for 7 Seasons. Cardin's intro to coaching was with the GCL Pirates in Bradenton, FL after his playing career ended. Active in player development, he has seen 25 former players selected in the MLB draft and worked with former MLB All Stars. Cardin is a graduate of UNCW and currently resides in Wilmington with his family.

== Uniforms ==
The Sharks' colors are white, navy blue, and light blue. Their standard home uniform is a white jersey and white pants with navy and light blue trim, with SHARKS printed in stylized block font across the front. Other uniforms include white pants with a light blue jersey having the Sharks logo on the left breast, and white pants with a navy blue jersey having WILMINGTON printed across the front.

They wear two caps: one mostly navy blue except for a light blue bill and the other entirely navy blue. The Sharks logo is on the front of both caps.

== Yearly records ==
| Season | Record | Postseason Record |
|---|---|---|
| 1997 | 22-28 | DNQ |
| 1998 | 27-23 | Won Championship |
| 1999 | 33-16 | Won Championship |
| 2000 | 26-18 | 0-1 |
| 2001 | 21–29 | DNQ |
| 2002 | 31–17 | 0–1 |
| 2003 | 29–22 | 0–1 |
| 2004 | 24-27 | DNQ |
| 2005 | 28-26 | DNQ |
| 2006 | 19-34 | DNQ |
| 2007 | 22-33 | DNQ |
| 2008 | 24-31 | DNQ |
| 2009 | 19-36 | DNQ |
| 2010 | 27-29 | DNQ |
| 2011 | 29-27 | 3-3 |
| 2012 | 29-23 | 0–2 |
| 2013 | 31-23 | 1–2 |
| 2014 | 24-30 | DNQ |
| 2015 | 29-24 | 3-3 |
| 2016 | 32-22 | 0–1 |
| 2017 | 31-24 | 3–2 |
| 2018 | 17-34 | DNQ |
| 2019 | 20-31 | DNQ |
| 2020 | Did Not Play | Did Not Play |
| 2021 | 23-19 | DNQ |
| 2022 | 23-24 | DNQ |
| 2023 | 24-21 | 3-3, Lost Petit Cup |
| 2024 | 26-19 | 4–0, Won Petitt Cup |
| 2025 | 25-20 | 0–1 |
| 2026 | 32-14 | 5-1, Won Petitt Cup |
| Overall Record: 747-724 (.507) | | Postseason Record Since 2002: 22-21 (.512) |

== MLB alumni ==
- Landon Powell (2001); C, Oakland Athletics (2009–2011)
- Tom Mastny (2002); pitcher, Cleveland Indians (2006–2008)
- John Raynor (2005); OF, Pittsburgh Pirates (2010)
- Chris Hatcher (2005); pitcher, Miami Marlins, Los Angeles Dodgers, Oakland Athletics (2011–2018)
- Brandon Guyer (2005); OF, Tampa Bay Rays, Cleveland Indians (2011–2018)
- Rob Wooten (2006); pitcher, Milwaukee Brewers (2013–2015)
- Cody Eppley (2007); pitcher, Texas Rangers, New York Yankees (2011–2013)
- Seth Frankoff (2007); pitcher, Chicago Cubs, Seattle Mariners, Arizona Diamondbacks (2017, 2020–2021)
- Chris Mazza (2010–2011); pitcher, New York Mets, Boston Red Sox, Tampa Bay Rays (2019–2022)
- Emilio Pagan (2011); pitcher, Seattle Mariners, Oakland Athletics, Tampa Bay Rays, San Diego Padres, Minnesota Twins, Cincinnati Reds (2017–Present)
- Chris O'Grady (2011); pitcher, Miami Marlins (2017–2018)
- Alec Bohm (2016); 3B, Philadelphia Phillies (2020-Present)
- Ryan Jeffers (2016); C, Minnesota Twins (2020-Present)
- Grant Koch (2016); C, Pittsburgh Pirates (2024)
- Mitch Spence (2017); pitcher, Oakland Athletics (2024)
- Garrett McDaniels (2019) pitcher, Los Angeles Angels (2025)
- Justin Dean (2018); OF, Los Angeles Dodgers (2025)
- Scott Bandura (2022); OF, San Francisco Giants (2026)

== Other alumni ==
- Noah Bridges (2022); Savannah Bananas exhibition player and internet personality
- Mason Maxwell (2022); Firefighters exhibition player and internet personality
- Joe Sperone (2022–2023); Texas Tailgaters exhibition player and internet personality
- Brett Carson (2021); Texas Tailgaters exhibition player and internet personality

| DRAFTED | ROUND | PICK # | PLAYER NAME | POS | SCHOOL | MLB TEAM | SHARKS YR(S) |
|---|---|---|---|---|---|---|---|
| 2026 | 5 | 150 | Luke Nixon | INF | NC State | San Francisco | 2024 |
| 2026 | 13 | 403 | Caleb Johnson | INF | Jacksonville St | Los Angeles (NL) | 2024, 2025 |
| 2026 | 19 | 565 | Jackson Mitchell | P | Binghamton | Miami | 2025 |
| 2026 | FA | - | Jack Nedrow | P | USF | Toronto | 2023 |
| 2025 | 6 | 171 | Boston Smith | C | Wright St | Washington | 2024 |
| 2025 | 13 | 380 | Bryan Arendt | C | UNCW | Las Vegas | 2024 |
| 2025 | 13 | 396 | Aubrey Smith | P | UNCW | Houston | 2024 |
| 2025 | 17 | 518 | Luke Nowak | OF | Illinois-Chicago | Kansas City | 2023 |
| 2025 | FA | - | Cam Hassert | INF | LMU | Colorado | 2023, 2024 |
| 2024 | 10 | 296 | RJ Sales | P | UNCW | Detroit | 2023 |
| 2024 | 10 | 306 | Trey Pooser | P | Kentucky | Tampa Bay | 2021 |
| 2024 | 11 | 323 | Nick Roselli | INF | Binghamton | New York (NL) | 2022 |
| 2024 | FA | - | Alec Makarewicz | INF | NC State | Chicago (AL) | 2021 |
| 2024 | FA | - | Trace Willhoite | INF | Lipscomb University | New York (NL) | 2024 |
| 2023 | 7 | 210 | Scott Bandura | OF | Princeton | San Francisco | 2022 |
| 2023 | 10 | 286 | Tom Reisenger | P | East Stroudsburg | Oakland | 2023 |
| 2023 | 14 | 410 | David Smith | INF | Connecticut | Detroit | 2021 |
| 2023 | 19 | 565 | Wyatt Crenshaw | INF | Co. Christian/Az.State | Arizona | 2022 |
| 2023 | 19 | 578 | Josh Harlow | P | Mercer | Cleveland | 2021, 2023 |
| 2022 | FA | − | Max Alba | P | Liberty University | Detroit | 2021, 2022 |
| 2022 | FA | − | Alan Carter | P | Lee University | Los Angeles (AL) | 2022 |
| 2022 | FA | − | Maddux Houghton | P | Lipscomb University | Minnesota | 2022 |
| 2022 | FA | − | Liam Doolan | P | Tennessee Wesleyan | Los Angeles (NL) | 2022 |
| 2022 | FA | - | Garrett McDaniels | P | Mount Olive | Los Angeles (NL) | 2019 |
| 2021 | 8 | 234 | James Parker | INF | Clemson | Seattle | 2019 |
| 2021 | 10 | 298 | Michael Sandle | OF | South Alabama | Houston | 2017 |
| 2021 | 16 | 481 | Aaron McKeithan | C | Charlotte | St. Louis | 2019 |
| 2021 | FA | − | Joe Kemlage | P | American Int. | San Francisco | 2021 |
| 2019 | 9 | 261 | Evan Braband | P | Liberty University | Miami | 2017 |
| 2019 | 9 | 287 | Cody Scroggins | P | Arkansas | Boston | 2016 |
| 2019 | 10 | 315 | Mitch Spence | P | USC Aiken | New York (AL) | 2017 |
| 2019 | 29 | 885 | Chase Illig | C | West Virginia | New York (AL) | 2016 |
| 2018 | 1 | 3 | Alec Bohm | INF | Wichita State | Philadelphia | 2016 |
| 2018 | 5 | 144 | Grant Koch | C | Arkansas | Pittsburgh | 2016 |
| 2018 | 10 | 287 | Madison Stokes | INF | South Carolina | Philadelphia | 2016 |
| 2018 | 12 | 371 | Graham Lawson | P | South Carolina | Washington | 2017 |
| 2018 | 16 | 465 | Dayton Dugas | OF | Wichita State | Detroit | 2017 |
| 2018 | 17 | 502 | Justin Dean | OF | Lenoir-Rhyne | Atlanta | 2017 |
| 2018 | 18 | 549 | Kyler Stout | P | Oral Roberts | Arizona | 2016 |
| 2018 | 20 | 606 | Luke Moragan | OF | College of Charleston | Colorado | 2017 |
| 2018 | 26 | 777 | Tyler Jones | P | Wichita State | Miami | 2015 |
| 2017 | 3 | 103 | Matt Whatley | C | Oral Roberts | Texas | 2015 |
| 2017 | 8 | 235 | Connor Riley | P | USC Aiken | Los Angeles (AL) | 2016 |
| 2017 | 14 | 417 | Alex Destino | OF | South Carolina | Chicago (AL) | 2015 |
| 2017 | 21 | 620 | Jeffrey 'Connor' Johnstone | P | Wake Forest | Atlanta | 2015 |
| 2017 | 21 | 627 | John Parke | P | South Carolina | Chicago (AL) | 2014 |
| 2017 | 22 | 647 | Justin Bellinger | INF | Duke | Cincinnati | 2014 |
| 2017 | 22 | 651 | Brice Conley | P | Georgia State | Oakland | 2014 |
| 2017 | 22 | 672 | Clark Scolamiero | OF | N. Greenville College | Cleveland | 2016 |
