= Outer Banks Scallywags =

American collegiate baseball team

- Logo

Information
- League: CPL (1997, 1999–2011); Premier Collegiate League (2013–present)
- Location: Manteo, North Carolina
- Ballpark: Coy Tillett Sr. Memorial Field
- Founded: 1997
- Division championships: 1 (2002 CPL North)
- League championships: 6 (2002, 2003 Pettit Cup; 2013, 2014 Postove Cup Co-Champions; 2016, 2018 Postove Cup Champions)
- Former name: Outer Banks Daredevils (1997-2022)
- Colors: Black, Gold, White
- Mascot: Homer the Home Run Horse
- Ownership: Outer Banks Community Baseball
- Coach: Zach Alexander
- Website: OuterBanksDaredevils.com

The Outer Banks Scallywags are an amateur baseball team playing in the Premier Collegiate League, a collegiate summer baseball league. The team plays its home games at the Coy Tillett Sr Memorial Field located on the campus of Manteo High School in Manteo, North Carolina.

The Scallywags were one of the original teams in the Coastal Plain League when the league was founded in 1997. The team was originally named the Outer Banks Daredevils and located in Manteo until the team moved to Kill Devil Hills in 2006; for the 2023 season the team moved their home field back to Manteo and rebranded as the Outer Banks Scallywags. Since their founding, the Scallywags have had much success winning the 2002 and 2003 Coastal Plain League championships. After missing the 2012 season, the Scallywags joined the Tidewater Summer League for the 2013 season and went on to win four Tidewater Summer League championships (2013, 2015, 2016, 2018).

After the team's 2020, 2021, and 2022 seasons were canceled due to the COVID-19 pandemic, the team resumed play in 2023.

== Alumni ==
- Sam Narron (2000); pitcher, Texas Rangers (2004)
- Justin Maxwell (2002); outfielder, Houston Astros (current)

== Awards ==
- Marshall Hubbard – Offensive Player of the Year

== Season-by-season record ==
Outer Banks Scallywags
Year	Regular Season			Postseason		
Year	Record	Win %	Finish	Record	Win %	Result
Coastal Plain League (1997, 1999–2011)
1997	25–25	.500	4th	—	—	—
1999	30–18	.625	2nd			
2000	25–22	.532	6th	—	—	—
2001	19–31	.380	11th	—	—	—
2002	28–21	.571	2nd	4–1	.800	Won Petitt Cup Championship
2003	28–21	.571	4th	3–0	1.000	Won Petitt Cup Championship
2004	23–22–1	.511	5th	3–2	.600	Lost in Petitt Cup Championship
2005	23–32	.418	12th	—	—	—
2006	19–36	.345	12th	—	—	—
2007	21–30	.412	12th	—	—	—
2008	27–28	.491	7th	0–1	.000	Lost in Round One
2009	32–23	.582	4th	2–2	.500	Lost in Round Two
2010	23–31	.426	11th	—	—	—
2011	26–28	.481	11th	—	—	—
Tidewater Summer League (2013–present)
2013	20-7	.741	1st	1–1	.500	Postove Cup Co-Champions
2014	18-5	.783	2nd	3–2	.600	Lost in Postove Cup Championship
2015	13–8	.619	1st	1–1	.500	Postove Cup Co-Champions
2016	12-4	.750	1st	-	-	Postove Cup Champions
2017	7-7	.500	5th	1-1	.500	Lost in Semifinals
2018	16-6	.727	1st	4-0	1.000	Postove Cup Champions
2019	11-7	.611	3rd	1-2	.333	Lost in Round Two
Totals	446–412–1	.520	–	23–13	.639	6 League Championships
