= Coastal Plain League =

U.S. collegiate summer baseball league

- Sport: Baseball
- Founded: 1997
- No. of teams: 15
- Country: United States
- Most recent champion: Wilmington Sharks (2026)
- Most titles: Wilmington Sharks (4)
- Website: coastalplain.com

The Coastal Plain League (CPL) is a wood-bat collegiate summer baseball league, featuring college players recruited from throughout the United States. The league takes its name from the Class D level Coastal Plain League which operated in the area from 1937 to 1952.

== History ==
The modern CPL was formed with six teams in 1997. The league has expanded over the years with teams across North Carolina, South Carolina, Virginia, and Georgia, with the 2024 addition of the Greenville Yard Gnomes being the most recent expansion, bringing the league to 15 teams. On May 24, 2025, Alexia Jorge became the first woman to play in the CPL, which she did as a catcher for the Holly Springs Salamanders.

Capitol Broadcasting Company purchased the league in 2022.

=== Founding ===
The league was founded in 1997 by Pete Bock. He conceived the idea in the early 1990s while traveling long distances to the Valley Baseball League in Virginia to see his son, Jeff, play summer baseball. Bock, an experienced sports executive, wanted a collegiate summer league closer to his home. He acted on it, and the CPL began play for the 1997 season.

== Teams ==
East Division
West Division
Hiatus

Coastal Plain League
East Division
Team	City	Stadium	Year founded
Greenville Yard Gnomes	Greenville, North Carolina	Guy Smith Stadium	2024
Holly Springs Salamanders	Holly Springs, North Carolina	North Main Athletic Complex Stadium	2015
Morehead City Marlins	Morehead City, North Carolina	O'Neal Field at Big Rock Stadium	2010
Peninsula Pilots	Hampton, Virginia	War Memorial Stadium	2000
Tri-City Chili Peppers	Colonial Heights, Virginia	Shepherd Stadium	2020
Wilmington Sharks	Wilmington, North Carolina	Buck Hardee Field at Legion Stadium	1997
Zebulon Devil Dogz	Zebulon, North Carolina	Five County Stadium	2026
West Division
Team	City	Stadium	Year founded
Asheboro ZooKeepers	Asheboro, North Carolina	McCrary Park	1999
Boone Bigfoots	Boone, North Carolina	Jim and Bettie Smith Stadium	2021 (joined 2023)
Florence Flamingos	Florence, South Carolina	Carolina Bank Field	1997
Forest City Owls	Forest City, North Carolina	McNair Field	2008
High Point-Thomasville HiToms	Thomasville, North Carolina	Finch Field	1999
Lexington County Blowfish	Lexington, South Carolina	Lexington County Baseball Stadium	2006
Macon Bacon	Macon, Georgia	Luther Williams Field	2018
Martinsville Mustangs	Martinsville, Virginia	Hooker Field	2005

=== Teams on hiatus ===
The following teams will be on hiatus for the 2026 season:

Team	Location	Ballpark	Capacity	Joined
Smithfield Tobs	Smithfield, North Carolina	Smithfield Community Park	-	1997

=== Former teams ===
- Raleigh RedWolves (1997, moved to Florence)
- Rocky Mount Rockfish (1997–98)
- Durham Braves (1997–2000, renamed Durham Americans)
- Durham Americans (2001–03, formerly Durham Braves)
- Spartanburg Stingers (2003–07, moved to Forest City, renamed Owls)
- New Bern River Rats (2005–07, moved to Morehead City, renamed Marlins in 2010)
- Outer Banks Daredevils (1997, 1999–2011, changed leagues)
- Petersburg Generals (2000–2016)
- Edenton Steamers (1998–2019, changed leagues)
- Fayetteville SwampDogs (2001–2019)
- Gastonia Grizzlies (2002–2020, moved to Spartanburg, renamed Spartanburgers)
- Spartanburgers (2021, suspended operations)
- Savannah Bananas (2016–2022, left league to concentrate on its professional exhibition operation)
- Wilson Tobs (1997–2025, moving to Smithfield for 2027)

=== Past champions ===
==== Petitt Cup years ====
Year	Pettit Cup Winner	Runner-up	Series Result	East Division winner	West Division winner		
2025	Wilson	Forest City	2 games to 0	Wilson	Forest City		
2024	Wilmington	Lexington County	2 games to 0	Peninsula	Martinsville		
2023	Lexington County	Wilmington	2 games to 1	Morehead City	Lexington County		
2022	Savannah	Wilson	2 games to 0	Morehead City	Savannah		
2021	Savannah	Morehead City	2 games to 1	Peninsula	Savannah		
Year	Pettit Cup Winner	Runner-up	Series Result	North Division winner	South Division winner	East Division winner	West Division winner
2019	Morehead City	Macon	2 games to 1	Wilson	Savannah	Morehead City	Gastonia
2018	Morehead City	Thomasville	2 games to 0	Peninsula	Savannah	Morehead City	Thomasville
Year	Pettit Cup Winner	Runner-up	Series Result	East Division winner	West Division winner		
2017	Gastonia	Wilmington	2 games to 0	Wilmington	Forest City		
2016	Savannah	Peninsula	2 games to 1	Peninsula	Forest City		
2015	Edenton	Gastonia	2 games to 0	Edenton	Asheboro		
2014	Peninsula	Florence	2 games to 1	Peninsula	Florence		
2013	Peninsula	Columbia	2 games to 0	Edenton	Asheboro		
2012	Columbia	Fayetteville	2 games to 1	Edenton	Martinsville		
Year	Pettit Cup Winner	Runner-up	Series Result	North Division winner	South Division winner	West Division winner	
2011	Gastonia	Edenton	2 games to 1	Edenton	Fayetteville	Thomasville	
2010	Forest City	Edenton	2 games to 1	Wilson	Morehead City	Gastonia	
2009	Forest City	Peninsula	2 games to 0	Peninsula	Wilson	Forest City	
Year	Pettit Cup Winner	Runner-up	Game Result	North Division winner	South Division winner	West Division winner	
2008	Thomasville	Florence	7–4	Peninsula	Wilson	Thomasville	
2007	Thomasville	Peninsula	4–3	Edenton	Fayetteville	Thomasville	
2006	Thomasville	Peninsula	6–1	Peninsula	Fayetteville	Martinsville	
2005	Edenton	Florence	9–1	Edenton	Florence	Gastonia	
2004	Edenton	Outer Banks	13–2	Edenton	Wilson	Thomasville	
2003	Outer Banks	Florence	7–2	Petersburg	Durham	Thomasville	
2002	Outer Banks	Petersburg	10–6	Outer Banks	Wilmington	Gastonia	

Playoff seedings based on overall record, so division champions listed are based on overall record.

==== Pre-Petitt Cup ====
Year	Winner	Runner-up	Series Result	North Division winner	South Division winner
2001	Durham	Wilson		Wilson	Fayetteville
2000	Petersburg	Asheboro		Petersburg	Asheboro
Year	Winner	Runner-up	Series Result	First Half winner	Second Half winner
1999	Wilmington	Outer Banks		Wilmington	Outer Banks
1998	Wilmington	Rocky Mount		Wilmington	Rocky Mount
1997	Raleigh	Wilson	2 games to 0	Raleigh	Wilson
