= Smithfield Tobs =

Coastal Plain League baseball team

Information
- League: Coastal Plain League (East)
- Location: Smithfield, North Carolina
- Ballpark: Smithfield Community Park
- Founded: 1997
- League championships: 2025
- Colors: Gold and Black
- Mascot: Slugger (Tobacco worm)
- Ownership: Rick Holland
- President: Greg Suire
- General manager: Mike Bell
- Manager: Tony Rosselli
- Website: smithfieldtobs.com

The Smithfield Tobs are an amateur baseball team playing in the Coastal Plain League, an NCAA-sanctioned collegiate summer baseball league. The team plays its home games at Smithfield Community Park in Smithfield, North Carolina. The team relocated to Smithfield from Wilson, North Carolina in 2026, planning to resume play in 2027. Today's Tobs were one of the original teams in the collegiate Coastal Plain League when the league was founded in 1997; prior to 1997 the town of Wilson hosted minor league teams throughout the 20th century. In 2005 the Coastal Plain League named the Tobs the CPL Organization of the Year. The Tobs' mascot has been a tobacco worm named Slugger since the 1999 season.
