= 1988 Seattle Mariners season =

1988 Seattle Mariners
- League: American League
- Division: West
- Ballpark: Kingdome
- City: Seattle, Washington
- Record: 68–93 (.422)
- Divisional place: 7th
- Owners: George Argyros
- General managers: Dick Balderson, Woody Woodward
- Managers: Dick Williams (23–33); Jim Snyder (45–60)
- Television: KIRO-TV 7
- Radio: KIRO 710 AM (Dave Niehaus, Rick Rizzs, Joe Simpson)

The 1988 Seattle Mariners season was their twelfth since the franchise creation and their home ballpark was the Kingdome in Seattle, Washington. The M's finished seventh (last) in the American League West with a record of 68–93 (.422). Manager Dick Williams, who later was inducted into the Hall of Fame, was fired in early June; first base coach Jim Snyder was promoted to interim manager in his only season as an MLB manager.

== Offseason ==
- December 9, 1987: Phil Bradley and Tim Fortugno acquired from the Philadelphia Phillies for Glenn Wilson, Mike Jackson, and Dave Brundage.
- December 9: Mike Morgan traded to the Baltimore Orioles for Ken Dixon.
- December 21: John Moses was released by the Mariners.
- December 22: Lee Guetterman, Clay Parker, and Wade Taylor traded to the New York Yankees for Steve Trout and Henry Cotto.
- January 11, 1998: Brian Giles signed as a free agent.
- January 19: John Rabb signed as a free agent with the Mariners.
- February 3: Received Dave Cochrane in a trade with the Kansas City Royals for Ken Spratke.
- March 19: Received Rod Scurry in a trade with the San Francisco Giants for a player to be named later (Donell Nixon on June 23).

== Regular season ==
=== Opening Day lineup ===
- Mickey Brantley, center field
- Mike Kingery, left field
- Alvin Davis, first base
- Ken Phelps, designated hitter
- Glenn Wilson, right field
- Dave Valle, catcher
- Jim Presley, third base
- Rey Quiñones, shortstop
- Harold Reynolds, second base
- Mark Langston, starting pitcher

=== Season standings ===
AL West
Team	W	L	Pct.	GB	Home	Road
Oakland Athletics	104	58	.642	—	54‍–‍27	50‍–‍31
Minnesota Twins	91	71	.562	13	47‍–‍34	44‍–‍37
Kansas City Royals	84	77	.522	19½	44‍–‍36	40‍–‍41
California Angels	75	87	.463	29	35‍–‍46	40‍–‍41
Chicago White Sox	71	90	.441	32½	40‍–‍41	31‍–‍49
Texas Rangers	70	91	.435	33½	38‍–‍43	32‍–‍48
Seattle Mariners	68	93	.422	35½	37‍–‍44	31‍–‍49

=== Record vs. opponents ===
1988 American League record Sources:
Team	BAL	BOS	CAL	CWS	CLE	DET	KC	MIL	MIN	NYY	OAK	SEA	TEX	TOR
Baltimore	—	4–9	5–7	4–7	4–9	5–8	0–12	4–9	3–9	3–10	4–8	7–5	6–6	5–8
Boston	9–4	—	8–4	7–5	8–5	6–7	6–6	10–3	7–5	9–4	3–9	6–6	8–4	2–11
California	7–5	4–8	—	9–4	8–4	5–7	5–8	3–9	4–9	6–6	4–9	6–7	8–5	6–6
Chicago	7–4	5–7	4–9	—	3–9	3–9	7–6	6–6	4–9	3–9	5–8	9–4	8–5	7–5
Cleveland	9–4	5–8	4–8	9–3	—	4–9	6–6	9–4	5–7	6–7	4–8	5–7	6–6	6–7
Detroit	8–5	7–6	7–5	9–3	9–4	—	8–4	5–8	1–11	8–5	4–8	9–3	8–4	5–8
Kansas City	12–0	6–6	8–5	6–7	6–6	4–8	—	3–9	7–6	6–6	8–5	7–5	7–6	4–8
Milwaukee	9–4	3–10	9–3	6–6	4–9	8–5	9–3	—	7–5	6–7	3–9	8–4	8–4	7–6
Minnesota	9–3	5–7	9–4	9–4	7–5	11–1	6–7	5–7	—	3–9	5–8	8–5	7–6	7–5
New York	10–3	4–9	6–6	9–3	7–6	5–8	6–6	7–6	9–3	—	6–6	5–7	5–6	6–7
Oakland	8–4	9–3	9–4	8–5	8–4	8–4	5–8	9–3	8–5	6–6	—	9–4	8–5	9–3
Seattle	5–7	6–6	7–6	4–9	7–5	3–9	5–7	4–8	5–8	7–5	4–9	—	6–7	5–7
Texas	6–6	4–8	5–8	5–8	6–6	4–8	6–7	4–8	6–7	6–5	5–8	7–6	—	6–6
Toronto	8–5	11–2	6–6	5–7	7–6	8–5	8–4	6–7	5–7	7–6	3–9	7–5	6–6	—

=== Season summary ===
- The Mariners started the season on a high point, sharing a lead in the American League West and having a winning record at 4–3 in mid-April. They fell to last place briefly on May 1 and were entrenched in seventh place by mid-June.
- Mark Langston became the ace of the pitching staff as he led the club in wins (15) and strikeouts (235). He was named the American League (AL) Pitcher of the Month in August after going 4–1 with three complete games.
- Manager Dick Williams was fired on June 6, first base coach Jim Snyder was promoted to interim manager.
- Seattle acquired future Mariners Hall of Famer Jay Buhner from the New York Yankees in a trade for Ken Phelps.
- Four Mariners were named the AL Player of the Week. First baseman Alvin Davis won in May, second baseman Harold Reynolds won in August, and pitchers Mike Moore and Langston each won in September.
- Langston and Reynolds won Gold Glove Awards. Reynolds tied for the AL lead with 11 triples but also led MLB with 29 times caught stealing. He was the Mariners representative in the All-Star Game.

==== Notable transactions ====
- May 23, 1988: John Christensen was released by the Mariners.
- June 1: Steve Balboni signed as a free agent with the Mariners.
- June 1: 1988 MLB draft. The following players signed with the Mariners:
  - Tino Martinez was selected with the 14th overall pick in the first round and signed on June 11.
  - Greg Pirkl was drafted in the second round and signed on June 6.
  - Lee Hancock was selected in the fourth round.
  - Jeff Darwin was selected in the 13th round.
- July 21: Ken Phelps was traded to the New York Yankees for Jay Buhner, Rich Balabon, and a player to be named later (Troy Evers, on October 12).
- July 22: Glenn Wilson was traded to the Pittsburgh Pirates for Darnell Coles.

=== Major League debuts ===
- Batters:
  - Greg Briley (June 27)
  - Bill McGuire (Aug 2)
- Pitchers:
  - Erik Hanson (Sep 5)
  - Mike Schooler (June 10)
  - Terry Taylor (Aug 19)

== 1988 roster ==
1988 Seattle Mariners
Roster
Pitchers: 15 Scott Bankhead; 27 Mike Campbell; 39 Erik Hanson; 38 Mike Jackson; 12 Mark Langston; 25 Mike Moore; 30 Edwin Núñez; 48 Dennis Powell; 31 Jerry Reed; 40 Mike Schooler; 19 Rod Scurry; 37 Julio Solano; 18 Bill Swift; 44 Terry Taylor; 34 Steve Trout; 32 Gene Walter; 13 Bill Wilkinson	Catchers: 9 Scott Bradley; 35 Bill McGuire; 10 Dave Valle; Infielders: 45 Steve Balboni; 21 Alvin Davis; 5 Mario Díaz; 11 Edgar Martínez; 44 Ken Phelps; 17 Jim Presley; 51 Rey Quiñones; 1 Rick Rentería; 4 Harold Reynolds; 35 Brick Smith	Outfielders: 14 Mickey Brantley; 8 Greg Briley; 43 Jay Buhner; 2 Darnell Coles; 28 Henry Cotto; 29 Bruce Fields; 16 Dave Hengel; 7 Mike Kingery; 29,30 John Rabb; 22 Glenn Wilson	Manager: 6 Jim Snyder; 23 Dick Williams; Coaches: 20 Howie Bedell; 36 Billy Connors; 33 Frank Howard; 3 Bill Plummer; 24 Phil Roof; 6 Jim Snyder; 32 Ozzie Virgil

== Player stats ==
= Indicates team leader

=== Batting ===
==== Starters by position ====
Note: Pos = Position; G = Games played; AB = At bats; H = Hits; Avg. = Batting average; HR = Home runs; RBI = Runs batted in

Pos	Player	G	AB	H	Avg.	HR	RBI
C	Scott Bradley	103	335	86	.257	4	33
1B	Alvin Davis	140	478	141	.295	18	69
2B	Harold Reynolds	158	598	169	.283	4	41
3B	Jim Presley	150	544	125	.230	14	62
SS	Rey Quiñones	140	499	124	.248	12	52
LF	Mickey Brantley	149	577	152	.263	15	56
CF	Henry Cotto	133	386	100	.259	8	33
RF	Glenn Wilson	78	284	71	.250	3	17
DH	Ken Phelps	72	190	54	.284	14	32

==== Other batters ====
Note: G = Games played; AB = At bats; H = Hits; Avg. = Batting average; HR = Home runs; RBI = Runs batted in

Player	G	AB	H	Avg.	HR	RBI
Steve Balboni	97	350	88	.251	21	61
Dave Valle	93	290	67	.231	10	50
Darnell Coles	55	195	57	.292	10	34
Jay Buhner	60	192	43	.224	10	25
Mike Kingery	57	123	25	.203	1	9
Rick Rentería	31	88	18	.205	0	6
Mario Díaz	28	72	22	.306	0	9
Bruce Fields	39	67	18	.269	1	5
Dave Hengel	26	60	10	.167	2	7
Greg Briley	13	36	9	.250	1	4
Edgar Martínez	14	32	9	.281	0	5
Bill McGuire	9	16	3	.188	0	2
John Rabb	9	14	5	.357	0	4
Brick Smith	4	10	1	.100	0	1

=== Pitching ===
==== Starting pitchers ====
Note: G = Games pitched; IP = Innings pitched; W = Wins; L = Losses; ERA = Earned run average; SO = Strikeouts

Player	G	IP	W	L	ERA	SO
Mark Langston	35	261.1	15	11	3.34	235
Mike Moore	37	228.2	9	15	3.78	182
Bill Swift	38	174.2	8	12	4.59	47
Scott Bankhead	21	135.0	7	9	3.07	102
Mike Campbell	20	114.2	6	10	5.89	63
Steve Trout	15	56.1	4	7	7.83	14
Erik Hanson	6	41.2	2	3	3.24	36
Terry Taylor	5	23.0	0	1	6.26	9

==== Other pitchers ====
Note: G = Games pitched; IP = Innings pitched; W = Wins; L = Losses; ERA = Earned run average; SO = Strikeouts

Player	G	IP	W	L	ERA	SO
Edwin Núñez	14	29.1	1	4	7.98	19
Dennis Powell	12	18.2	1	3	8.68	15

==== Relief pitchers ====
Note: G = Games pitched; W = Wins; L = Losses; SV = Saves; ERA = Earned run average; SO = Strikeouts

Player	G	W	L	SV	ERA	SO
Mike Schooler	40	5	8	15	3.54	54
Mike Jackson	62	6	5	4	2.63	76
Jerry Reed	46	1	1	1	3.96	48
Rod Scurry	39	0	2	2	4.02	33
Bill Wilkinson	30	2	2	2	3.48	25
Julio Solano	17	0	0	3	4.09	10
Gene Walter	16	1	0	0	5.13	13

== Farm system ==
Level	Team	League	Manager
AAA	Calgary Cannons	Pacific Coast League	Bill Plummer and Marty Martínez
AA	Vermont Mariners	Eastern League	Rich Morales
A	San Bernardino Spirit	California League	Ralph Dick
A	Wausau Timbers	Midwest League	Rick Sweet
A-Short Season	Bellingham Mariners	Northwest League	P. J. Carey
Rookie	AZL Mariners/Red Sox	Arizona League	Mike Verdi and Myron Pines

AZL club affiliation shared with Boston Red Sox
