= Daren Brown =

American baseball manager (born 1967)

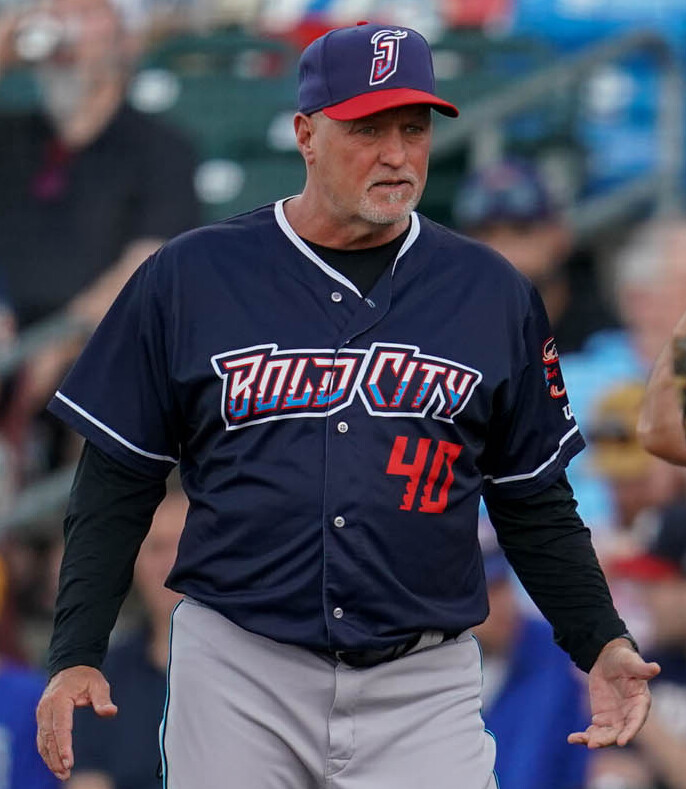
- Brown with the Jacksonville Jumbo Shrimp in 2024

Rocket City Trash Pandas – No. 43
- Manager / Coach
- Born: June 13, 1967 (age 58); Holdenville, Oklahoma, U.S.
- Bats: Right Throws: Right

MLB statistics
- Games managed: 50
- Win–loss record: 19–31
- Stats at Baseball Reference
- Managerial record at Baseball Reference

Teams
- As manager: Seattle Mariners (2010); As coach: Seattle Mariners (2006, 2013)

Daren Dwayne Brown (born June 13, 1967) is an American professional baseball manager who is a coach for the minor league Rocket City Trash Pandas. He most recently served as the manager for the Piratas de Campeche of the Mexican Baseball League. He was the interim manager of the Seattle Mariners of Major League Baseball (MLB) at the end of the 2010 season and spent much of the 2013 season as Seattle's third base coach.

Brown, whose father Paul Brown and uncle Jackie Brown played in MLB, was a pitcher in the Toronto Blue Jays minor league system from 1989 to 1993, and with the Amarillo Dillas of the independent Texas–Louisiana League from 1994 to 1999. He worked as a player-coach and player-manager with the Dillas. Starting in 2000, Brown was a manager in the Mariners minor league system and managed the Tacoma Rainiers from 2007 to 2013 and in 2019, except for a brief stint as interim manager of the Mariners in 2010. He served as interim third-base coach in the majors in 2013 after Jeff Datz announced his cancer diagnosis.

== Playing career ==
Brown pitched for Southeastern Oklahoma State University wrapping up his playing career with the Savages in 1989.

The son of big leaguer Paul Brown and nephew of Jackie Brown, Brown was drafted as a pitcher in the 29th round of the 1989 Major League Baseball draft by the Toronto Blue Jays and pitched in their farm system for four years with the Low-A St. Catharines Blue Jays, Single-A Myrtle Beach Blue Jays, High-A Dunedin Blue Jays, and Double-A Knoxville Blue Jays. From 1995 to 1999 he pitched for the independent league Amarillo Dillas. He was the Texas–Louisiana League Pitcher of the Year in 1995, 1997, and 1998, and made the league's All-Star team from 1995 to 1998.

== Coaching career ==
During Brown's time in Amarillo he also served as the team's pitching coach from 1994 to 1997 and was the club's manager from 1998 to 2000, compiling a 203–77 (.725) record which included winning the Texas–Louisiana League Championship in 1999. He was named the Texas–Louisiana League Manager of the Year in 1999.

Since 2001, Brown has worked in the Seattle Mariners organization. His first job with the Mariners was manager of the club's single-A affiliate, the San Bernardino Stampede. He helped San Bernardino reach the postseason in 2001 with a 43–27 second-half record, tops in the South Division, but fell in the first round of the playoffs. Brown led club to 77–63 overall record in 2002 and first-place finish in the first half of the season. In 2003 Brown led the Mariners' Class A affiliate, the Wisconsin Timber Rattlers to a 69–66 record in 2003. Wisconsin earned a playoff berth with a 38–28 first half and finished second in the division. The Timber Rattlers lost in the first round of the post-season. He spent 2004–2005 as manager of the Inland Empire 66ers. Led them to a 77–63 record and was the only team in Mariners organization to play in the postseason in 2004. In 2006, Brown managed the San Antonio Missions.

Beginning in 2007, Brown managed the Mariners Triple-A club, the Tacoma Rainiers. He became the all-time leader in managerial wins in Tacoma franchise history last season when he notched his 376th victory with the Rainiers on May 28, 2012. He led the Rainiers to back-to-back divisional titles in 2009 and 2010, including winning the Pacific Coast League Championship in 2010.

Brown was named the interim manager of the Mariners on August 9, 2010, after the team fired manager Don Wakamatsu, and by bringing in many players from Tacoma achieved a remarkable initial turnaround. In May 2013, Brown rejoined the Mariners, wearing uniform #52 as extra coach and to fill in as a third base coach when needed, while Jeff Datz underwent cancer treatment.

Brown returned to Tacoma for the 2019 season, after serving in other capacities within Seattle's farm system. After managing the 2019 Rainiers to 61 wins, he earned his 494th career win with Tacoma. Seattle did not bring back Brown for the 2021 season.

Brown was named the manager of the collegiate summer league Kingsport Axmen in 2021. He was hired to manage the Double-A Jacksonville Jumbo Shrimp in 2022.

On May 22, 2025, Brown was named as the manager for the Piratas de Campeche of the Mexican Baseball League, following the firing of Cory Snyder. He was named the league's manager of the year after improving the team from ninth place to third place in their division and a spot in the Serie Campeonato. Brown was fired by the Piratas on December 18.

In 2026, he became a coach with of the Double-A Rockey City Trash Pandas.

=== Managerial record ===
As of October 3, 2010

Team	From	To	Regular season record			Post–season record		
Team	From	To	W	L	Win %	W	L	Win %
Seattle Mariners	2010	2010	19	31	.380	—		
Total			19	31	.380	0	0	–

== Personal ==
Brown and his wife have a home in Amarillo, Texas.

Sporting positions
Preceded by Glenn Wilson	Amarillo Dillas manager 1999–2000	Succeeded by N/A
Preceded by Dino Ebel	San Bernardino Stampede manager 2001–2002	Succeeded by Team ceased operations
Preceded by Gary Thurman	Wisconsin Timber Rattlers manager 2003	Succeeded by Steve Roadcap
Preceded by Steve Roadcap	Inland Empire 66ers manager 2004–2005	Succeeded by Gary Thurman
Preceded by Dave Brundage	San Antonio Missions manager 2006	Succeeded by Randy Ready
Preceded by Dave Brundage; Jose Castro	Tacoma Rainiers manager 2007–2010; 2011–2013	Succeeded by Jose Castro; John Stearns
Preceded by Jeff Datz	Seattle Mariners third base coach 2013; Interim, May 3 – September 29	Succeeded by John Stearns
