= John Stearns =

American baseball player (1951–2022)

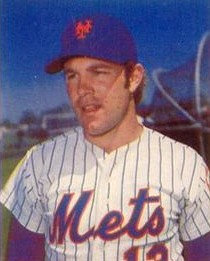
- Stearns with the New York Mets in 1977
- Catcher
- Born: August 21, 1951; Denver, Colorado, U.S.
- Died: September 15, 2022 (aged 71); Denver, Colorado, U.S.
- Batted: Right Threw: Right

MLB debut
- September 22, 1974, for the Philadelphia Phillies

Last MLB appearance
- September 30, 1984, for the New York Mets

MLB statistics
- Batting average: .260
- Home runs: 46
- Runs batted in: 312
- Stats at Baseball Reference

Teams
- As player: Philadelphia Phillies (1974); New York Mets (1975–1984); As coach: New York Yankees (1989); Baltimore Orioles (1996–1997); New York Mets (2000–2001); Seattle Mariners (2013)

Career highlights and awards
- 4× All-Star (1977, 1979, 1980, 1982)

John Hardin Stearns (August 21, 1951 – September 15, 2022), nicknamed "Bad Dude", was an American professional baseball catcher and coach in Major League Baseball (MLB). He played for the New York Mets from 1975 to 1984 after playing a single game for the Philadelphia Phillies in 1974.

Stearns was a two-sport star in college, and he entered professional baseball after being selected in both the MLB and National Football League drafts. He was a four-time MLB All-Star, but struggled with injuries in the latter portion of his career. After his retirement as a player, Stearns served as a coach for the New York Yankees, Baltimore Orioles, and New York Mets of MLB, as well as in Minor League Baseball.

== Early life ==
Stearns attended Thomas Jefferson High School in Denver, Colorado. He played three sports in high school, winning state championships in baseball and basketball. The Oakland Athletics selected Stearns in the 13th round of the 1969 Major League Baseball draft at 17 years old, but he chose to attend the University of Colorado Boulder instead.

Stearns became a two-sport star for the Colorado Buffaloes, playing both baseball and football. He earned the nickname "Bad Dude" for his "reputation of being a cocky, arrogant player". Playing as safety and also the team's punter, his 16 career interceptions remain the Colorado record as of 2021. He was drafted as a defensive back by the Buffalo Bills in the 17th round of the 1973 NFL draft. The Philadelphia Phillies selected Stearns in the first round, with the second overall pick in the 1973 Major League Baseball draft, and he chose to turn professional in baseball.

== Playing career ==
=== Early career (1973–1974) ===
Stearns's professional career started with the Reading Phillies of the Class AA Eastern League in 1973. After batting just .241 for Reading, he was demoted to the Rocky Mount Phillies of the High-A Carolina League for 1974 and batted .343 in 64 games. Mid-season, he was promoted directly to the Toledo Mud Hens of the Class AAA International League. He batted .266 for Toledo and was promoted to the major leagues in September. On September 22, 1974, Stearns made his major league debut and picked up his first hit, going 1-for-2 off the bench.

=== New York Mets (1975–1980) ===
Stearns's first game with the Phillies turned out to be his last. With budding prospect Bob Boone firmly entrenched behind the plate for Philadelphia, Stearns became expendable. He was traded along with Del Unser and Mac Scarce from the Phillies to the New York Mets for Tug McGraw, Don Hahn, and Dave Schneck at the Winter Meetings on December 3, 1974.

In his first season as a Met, Stearns spent 1975 as the backup catcher behind veteran Jerry Grote, the Mets' regular catcher since 1966. As Grote's backup, Stearns batted only .189 in 1975. In 1976, Stearns hit poorly in limited time and was soon replaced in backup duties by lefty hitter Ron Hodges. Stearns was sent back to the Tidewater Tides and hit very well while Hodges struggled in the majors. He was brought back to the majors for September and continued his hot hitting. With 18 hits in his first 13 games back, including seven hits in two games, Stearns not only ousted Hodges, but even took over the starting duties from Grote for most of the rest of the season.

Stearns was the starting catcher for most of 1977, with Grote and Hodges relegated to backup and pinch-hitting duty. In June, Stearns posted two games with four runs batted in, including the only grand slam of his career. On July 1, his average stood at .314, with a slugging average of .554. With his good mid-season statistics and the Mets firmly in last place in the National League East, Stearns was chosen as the team's sole representative to the All-Star Game, catching the bottom of the ninth inning. On August 31, 1977, the Mets traded Grote to the Los Angeles Dodgers for two players to be named later. Stearns had a .125 average in August and .167 average in September. His 25 doubles were most on the team and 12 home runs tied Steve Henderson and John Milner for the team lead. Despite a poor average and only two runs batted in during April, Stearns set career highs in home runs, runs batted in, runs, and total bases in 1978. He also led the team with a career high 25 stolen bases, and in the process broke the National League record for catchers, which had been held by Johnny Kling since 1902.

Stearns got into a bench clearing brawl in the fourth game of the 1979 season. With the Montreal Expos at Shea Stadium on April 11, Stearns and Expos catcher Gary Carter collided at home when Carter tried to score from first on a throwing error by Mets pitcher Pete Falcone. Right fielder Elliott Maddox made a perfect throw to the plate to get Carter. Following the play, a fight broke out when Stearns felt that Carter unnecessarily threw an elbow at him. Both benches and bullpens emptied, and both players were ejected from the game. Stearns set career highs in games played in 1979, but at age 27, it was his last season with 100 or more games. He also set personal highs in at-bats, hits, and doubles. Although he struggled to get above .200, a good June resulted in selection to his second All-Star Game (although he did not play). The Mets finished 1979 with 99 losses, and 35 games behind the division champion Pittsburgh Pirates. Well out of contention in the second half, they experimented by playing Stearns at both first base and third base, as well as in the outfield, but he finished out the season back behind the plate.

In 1980, Stearns hit no home runs, but his average was mostly between .300 and .320 from early May through the end of June. On June 12, 1980, two inebriated spectators jumped onto the playing field. While police were unable to catch them, Stearns grew frustrated and ran from behind the plate onto the third base side of the infield, tackling and subduing one of them. At Shea Stadium on July 4, 1980, Montreal Expos rookie Bill Gullickson sailed a pitch over Mets first baseman Mike Jorgensen's head in the second game of a doubleheader. Jorgensen didn't appreciate this as he had been the victim of one of the worst beanball injuries in baseball history the previous season with the Texas Rangers, and motioned toward Gullickson his disapproval. Stearns, who wasn't even in the line-up for this game, charged out of the dugout and grabbed Gullickson from behind by the neck. Gullickson responded by clocking Stearns in the face with three solid punches.

Stearns was selected to his third All-Star Game and logged his first All-Star Game at bat, grounding out in the fifth inning. A three-hit, three-runs batted in game highlighted his July, but just a week later, on July 26, a broken finger on a foul tip ended his season.

=== Injuries (1981–1986) ===
The injury that ended his 1980 season was the first of several injuries that would plague the rest of his career. Stearns started 1981 on the disabled list. After missing the first two weeks, he was eased back with pinch-hitting duty and play at first and third base. He started catching regularly again in late May and was hitting fairly well, when the 1981 Major League Baseball strike canceled two months of the season starting in mid-June. Play resumed in mid-August and Stearns finished with a respectable .271 average, but his run production dropped quite a bit from 1980 and he had only 14 extra base hits all season.

In the 1982 season, Stearns's average was again at or above .300 for much of the first half. He was again on pace for around 40 doubles and was even on pace for nearly 30 stolen bases. At age 30, Stearns was picked for his fourth All-Star Game. He continued hitting well after the break, but after a month, began suffering the effects of elbow tendinitis. He went on the disabled list in mid-August and only made three pinch running appearances the rest of the season.

The elbow injury that ended Stearns's 1982 season ultimately ended his career. In 1983, he was unable to start the season and was put on the disabled list in mid-April. Unable to throw, he played in only four games, all as a pinch-runner. In 1984, he spent some time with triple A Tidewater Tides and logged only one big league game in the first five months. He was well enough to play in September, but only played sporadically. After the season, the Mets traded Hubie Brooks, Mike Fitzgerald, Herm Winningham, and Floyd Youmans to Montreal for Carter. Stearns became a free agent and attempted a comeback with the Winter League's Ponce Lions, until re-injuring his elbow. Another comeback with the Cincinnati Reds' AAA Denver Zephyrs in 1985 was going well, until he was hit by a pitch in mid-May. Stearns made one final attempt at a comeback with the Texas Rangers, competing for a spot on their Opening Day roster in spring training in 1986.

== Post-playing career ==
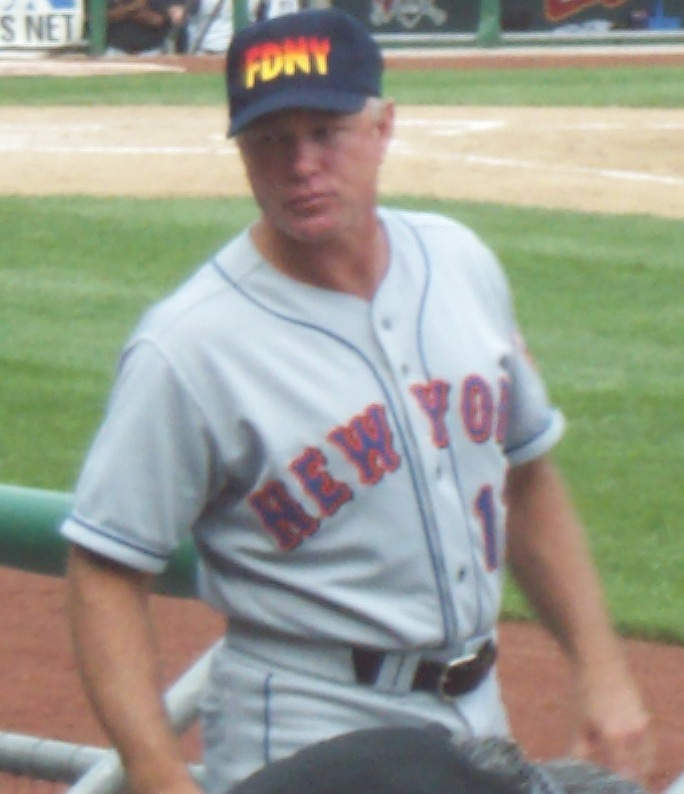
Stearns with the Mets in 2001

In late 1986, the Milwaukee Brewers hired Stearns as a scout and minor league instructor. In 1989, he was the New York Yankees' bullpen coach. He was then hired by the Toronto Blue Jays as the manager of the AA-level Knoxville Blue Jays for 1990 and 1991, reaching the post-season in the latter season.

Stearns spent 1992 as a Cincinnati Reds scout, and 1993 as an ESPN broadcaster. He returned to the Reds as the manager of their rookie-level team, the Princeton Reds, in 1994. The team won the Appalachian League championship and Stearns was named Manager of the Year. Afterwards, Stearns managed the Peoria Javelinas of the Arizona Fall League and won his second minor league championship of the year. He was added to the Reds coaching staff during the 1995 campaign by manager Davey Johnson who defied team owner Marge Schott's refusal to pay the salary for an additional coach. Schott was oblivious to the situation because it was never mentioned in her presence and Stearns wore a jersey without his name on the back.

Stearns was announced on January 5, 1996, as the first base coach on Johnson's staff with the Baltimore Orioles. He left the Orioles two years later in January 1998 when he was not retained by Ray Miller who had succeeded Johnson as manager.

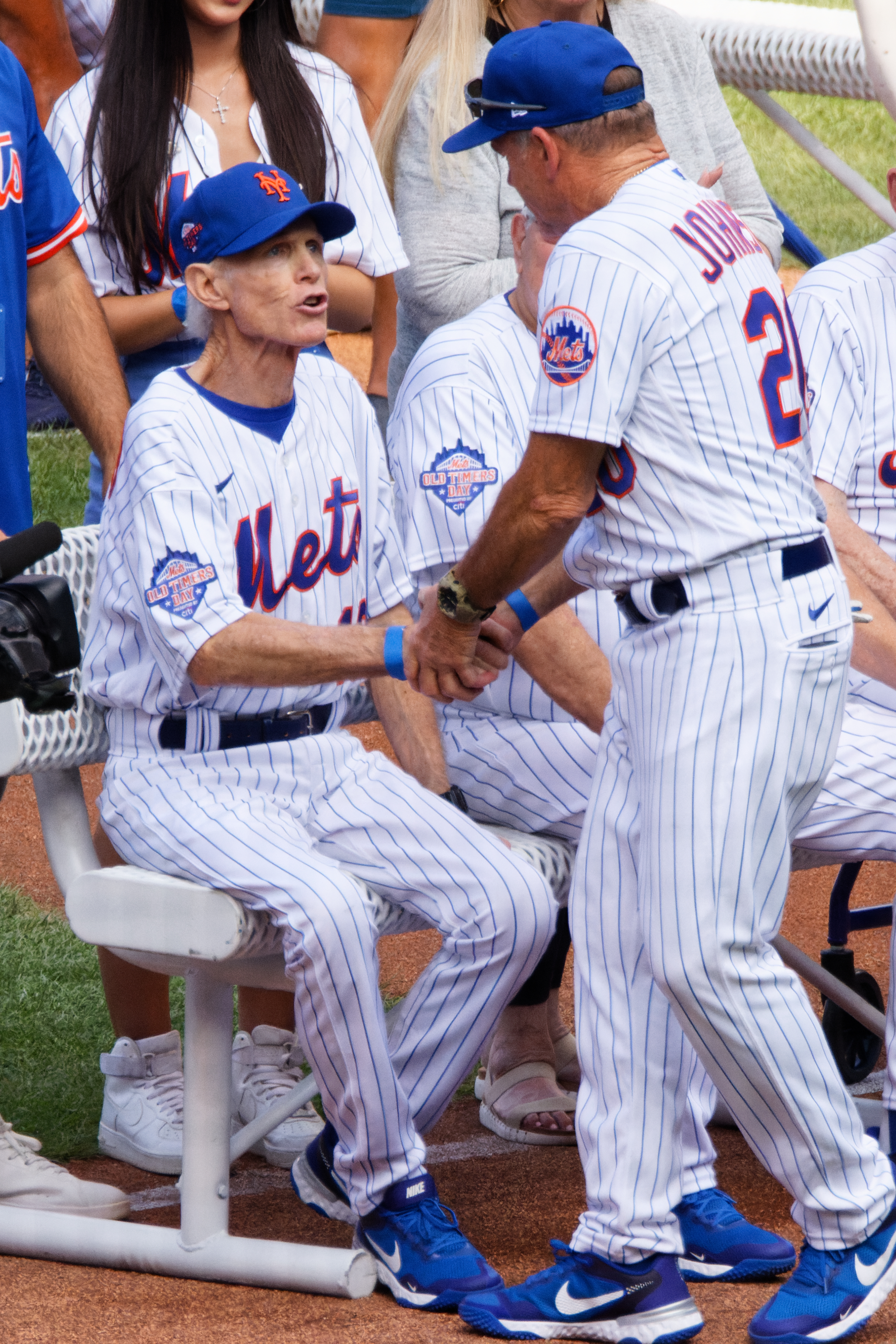
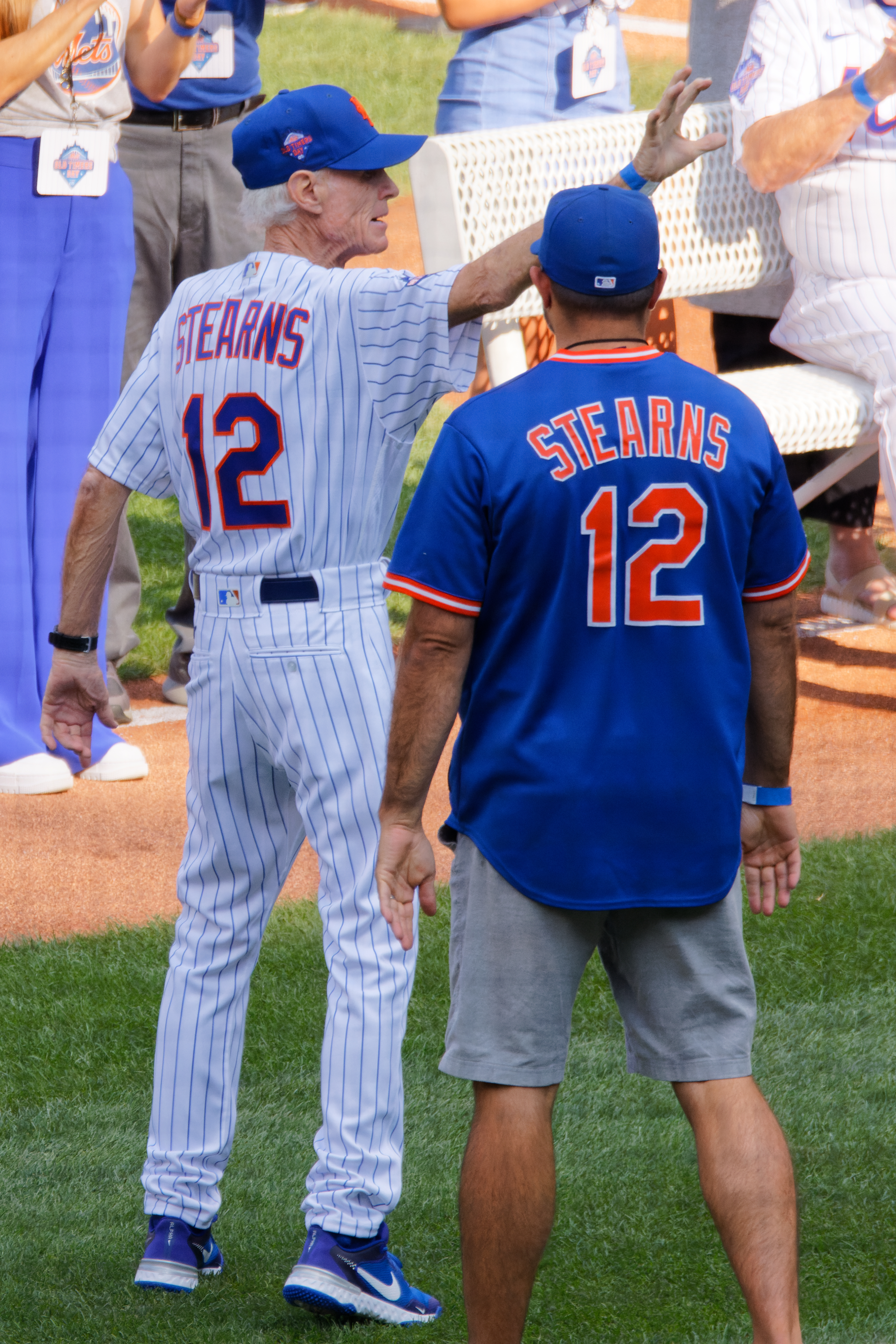
Despite his cancer diagnosis, Stearns was able to make an appearance at the Mets' Old-Timers' Day event on August 27, 2022.

In 1999, Stearns returned to the New York Mets as an advance scout. He was then made the Mets' bench coach in 2000. He was dismissed after the season, but re-hired as the third base coach. Younger fans witnessed Stearns's enthusiasm and excitability while he was a Mets coach in 2000. He was wearing a microphone for Fox television when the Mets' Mike Piazza hit a run-scoring double in Game 1 of the 2000 NLCS against the St. Louis Cardinals. Stearns's audible reaction of "The monster is out of the cage!" became a rallying cry for the entire series.

After two years coaching the major league Mets, Stearns was let go, but hired as a scout for 2002. In 2003, he returned to the dugout as Manager of the Binghamton Mets. Despite a poor record with AA Binghamton, he was made the manager of the AAA Norfolk Tides for 2004. Stearns spent 2005 as a roving catching instructor for the Mets.

On January 11, 2006, Stearns became a coach in the Washington Nationals farm system. He spent one season as manager of their triple A affiliate, the Columbus Clippers, and spent two seasons as manager of the Nationals' double A team, the Harrisburg Senators.

Stearns joined the Seattle Mariners as minor-league catching coordinator in 2011 and then served as a professional scout in 2012. On May 2, 2013, was named the interim manager for the Triple-A Tacoma Rainiers after Daren Brown replaced third-base coach Jeff Datz at his position due to Datz's cancer diagnosis. Stearns was named the Mariners' third base coach for the 2014 season. However, Stearns underwent surgery for a hiatal hernia prior to spring training and his slower-than-expected recovery compelled him to resign on March 7, 2014. He remained in the Mariners' organization, however, as a scout for the 2014 season. After attending a memorial service for his high school baseball coach in 2015, he said he was not sure how he would be involved with baseball again. Also in 2015, Stearns was interviewed at length in the book The Seventh Year Stretch: New York Mets, 1977-1983, by author Greg Prato.

== Personal life ==
Stearns and his wife, Martha Jo, married after the 1977 season. They had a son, named Justin.

In January 2022, Stearns was diagnosed with stage IV prostate cancer. Despite his diagnosis, Stearns was well enough to attend the Mets' Old Timers' Day at Citi Field on August 27. Stearns died of cancer on September 15, 2022, less than three weeks later, at the age of 71.

== Career statistics ==
Games	AB	Runs	Hits	2B	3B	HR	RBI	SB	BB	SO	HBP	Avg.	Slg.	Fld%	CS%
810	2681	334	696	152	10	46	312	91	323	294	25	.260	.341	.985	37%

Sporting positions
Preceded by Al Bumbry	Baltimore Orioles first base coach 1996–1997	Succeeded by Carlos Bernhardt
Preceded by Daren Brown	Seattle Mariners third base coach 2014	Succeeded by Rich Donnelly
