= Jay Buhner =

American baseball player (born 1964)

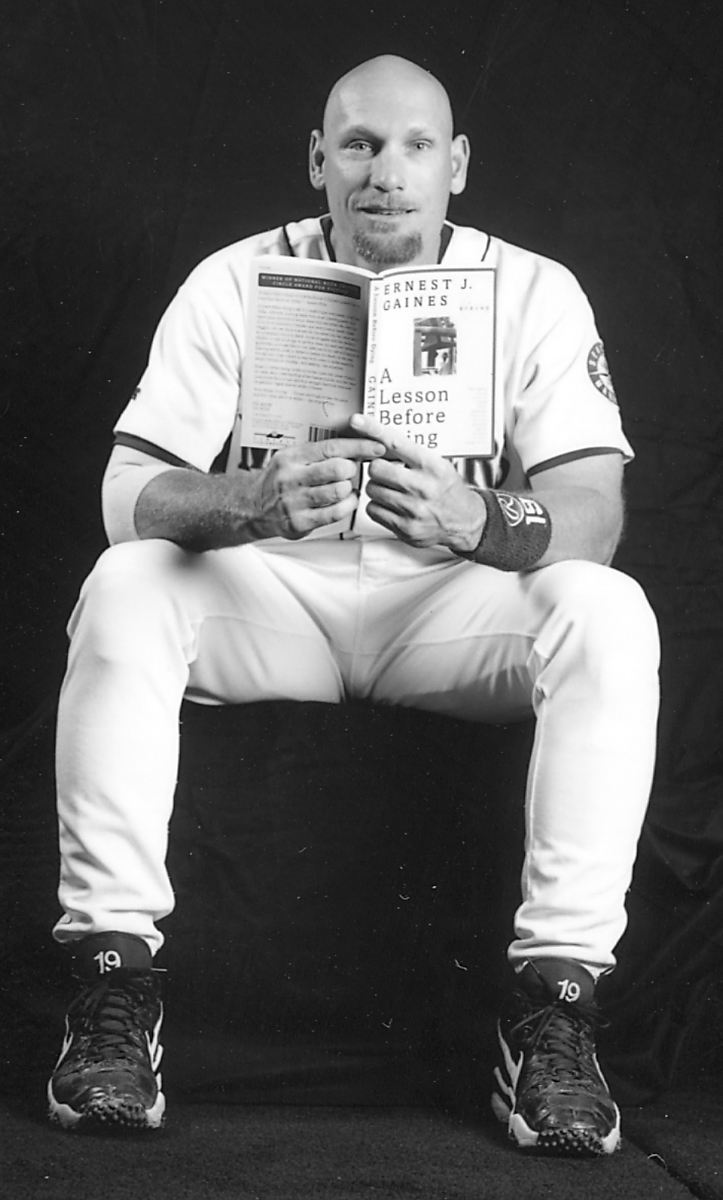
- Seattle Public Library ad in 1999
- Right fielder
- Born: August 13, 1964 (age 62); Louisville, Kentucky, U.S.
- Batted: Right Threw: Right

MLB debut
- September 11, 1987, for the New York Yankees

Last MLB appearance
- October 7, 2001, for the Seattle Mariners

MLB statistics
- Batting average: .254
- Home runs: 310
- Runs batted in: 964
- Stats at Baseball Reference

Teams
- New York Yankees (1987–1988); Seattle Mariners (1988–2001)

Career highlights and awards
- All-Star (1996); Gold Glove Award (1996); Seattle Mariners Hall of Fame

Jay Campbell Buhner (born August 13, 1964), nicknamed "Bone", is an American former professional baseball right fielder. He played for the New York Yankees and Seattle Mariners of Major League Baseball from 1987 to 2001. Noted for his shaved head, thick goatee, and patch of pine tar on the right hip of his uniform, he is regarded as one of the most popular players in Mariners' history.

== Early life ==
Born in Louisville, Kentucky, Buhner was raised in Texas and attended Clear Creek High School in League City, southeast of Houston, where he played baseball under coach Jim Mallory. His nickname, "Bone", came after an incident where Buhner lost a ball in the lights. The ball hit him in the skull, but he shook it off. Mallory came out to see if Buhner was OK and commented it was a good thing Buhner had such a bony head, and the name stuck.

Buhner graduated from high school in 1982 and played college baseball at McLennan Community College in Waco. In his freshman season in 1983, the Highlanders made their fourth consecutive trip to the junior college world series in Grand Junction, Colorado, and won their first national title. He was selected by the Atlanta Braves in the ninth round (230th overall) of the 1983 Major League Baseball draft, but opted not to sign.

== Professional career ==
=== Pittsburgh Pirates (1984) ===
During his sophomore year, in January 1984, Buhner was taken in the second round of the secondary phase of the free-agent draft by the Pittsburgh Pirates. He signed in late May and played the 1984 season for the short season Single-A Watertown Pirates in the New York–Penn League, batting .323 with nine home runs and 58 RBI in 65 games.

=== New York Yankees (1985–1988) ===
==== Minor leagues ====
On December 20, 1984, Buhner was traded to the New York Yankees with infielder Dale Berra as part of a five-player deal for outfielder Steve Kemp and shortstop Tim Foli, a former Pirate. He played the next two seasons in the Class-A Florida State League with the Fort Lauderdale Yankees, then moved up to Triple-A in 1987 with the Columbus Clippers in the International League. In 134 games with the Clippers, Buhner hit .279 with 31 home runs and 85 RBI. Managed by Bucky Dent, Columbus finished second in the regular season, but swept both series in the four-team playoffs to take the league title and Governors' Cup.

==== Major leagues ====
When the minor league playoffs concluded, Buhner was recalled by the Yankees on September 10, 1987. He made his major league debut the next night, finishing the game 0-for-4 with an RBI in a 6–5 loss to the Toronto Blue Jays. Buhner appeared in seven games with the Yankees to close out the year, batting .227 with two doubles and one RBI. In 1988, Buhner was back and forth between Columbus and New York. In a partial season with the Yankees he hit .188 with three home runs and 13 RBI in 25 games.

=== Seattle Mariners (1988–2001) ===
On July 21, 1988, the Yankees traded Buhner, along with career minor leaguers Rick Balabon and Troy Evers, to the Seattle Mariners for designated hitter Ken Phelps. He found out about the trade by reading about it in the newspaper. Buhner played in 60 games with the Mariners to finish the season, batting .224 with 10 home runs and 25 RBI. He then split the next two seasons between the Mariners and their Triple-A affiliate, the Calgary Cannons.

Buhner's career began an upwards turn in 1991, as he finished the season batting .244 with 27 home runs with 77 RBI in 137 games. On July 25, 1991, Buhner hit a massive 457-foot home run in Seattle's 6–5 win against his former team, the Yankees, at Yankee Stadium. He would go on to have continued success against the Yankees throughout his career. In an extra-inning home game against the Oakland Athletics on June 23, 1993, he became the first Mariner to hit for the cycle. Buhner began his cycle with a grand slam in the first inning, and hit a triple in the 14th inning to complete it. He subsequently scored the winning run on a wild pitch. Buhner became a free agent following the 1994 season and was pursued by the Baltimore Orioles, but he chose to remain in Seattle, signing a three-year, $15.5 million contract on December 21, 1994.

In 1995, Buhner had a career season, batting .262 with 40 home runs and 121 RBI in just 126 games, helping the Mariners to their first American League West title. In the 1995 American League Division Series (ALDS) against the Yankees, Buhner batted .458 with a hit in every game, including three games with at least three hits. In Game 4, he hit his first career postseason home run capping off a five-run eighth inning in Seattle's 11–8 win. He finished the game 3-for-4 with two runs scored, an RBI and a walk. The Mariners went on to defeat the Yankees in Game 5 and advanced to the 1995 American League Championship Series against the Cleveland Indians. In Game 3 of the series, Buhner hit two home runs, including the game-winning three-run home run in the 11th inning against reliever Eric Plunk to give Seattle a 5–2 win and a 2–1 series lead. The Mariners, however, would lose the next three games, ending their season. Buhner played in all 11 of Seattle's postseason games, batting .383 with four home runs and 8 RBI. After the season, he finished fifth in American League Most Valuable Player voting.

Buhner had continued success in 1996, finishing with a .271 average and setting career-highs with 44 home runs and 138 RBI in 150 games. His 159 strikeouts also led the American League. On July 2, Buhner was selected to the All-Star Game for the only time in his career. On August 3, he hit his 200th career home run in Seattle's 9–3 win over the Detroit Tigers. At the end of the season, Buhner won his first career Gold Glove Award.

On February 7, 1997, Buhner signed a two-year, $13 million extension with the Mariners, keeping him in Seattle through 1999. On September 24 against the Anaheim Angels, Buhner hit a 484-foot, three-run home run for his 40th home run of the season, giving the 1997 Mariners the single-season record for home runs by a team with 258. The Mariners went on to win the game, 4–3, giving them the AL West division title. In 157 games, Buhner hit .243 with 40 home runs and 109 RBI while striking out 175 times to lead the majors. In the 1997 ALDS, Buhner homered in Games 1 and 3, but hit just .231 in the series as the Mariners lost to the Baltimore Orioles in four games.

On April 6, 1998, Buhner injured his left knee while making a sliding catch in a game against the Yankees, causing him to undergo surgery. After missing two months, he returned to the Mariners lineup on June 11. He was limited to 72 games, and finished the season batting .242 with 15 home runs and 45 RBI. After the season, he underwent surgery on his right elbow, but returned in time for the start of the 1999 season.

Buhner was again limited by injury in 1999, missing nearly two months on the disabled list with a strained left hamstring. In 87 games, he hit just .222 with 14 home runs and 38 RBI. His .388 on-base percentage (OBP) was second on the team behind Edgar Martínez. On December 6, 1999, Buhner signed a one-year deal to return to the Mariners in 2000. On July 25, 2000, Buhner hit his 300th career home run against the Oakland Athletics. He went on to play in 112 games in 2000, batting .253 with 26 home runs and 82 RBI.

On December 7, 2000, Buhner signed another one-year contract with the Mariners for the 2001 season. However, he did not play for the team in spring training due to plantar fasciitis in his left foot and began the season on the disabled list. He returned on September 1, and played out the last month of the season, batting .222 with two home runs and 5 RBI in 19 games.

While well known for his tendency to strike out, Buhner also developed a patience at the plate which allowed him to walk 100 times in a season twice (1993 and 1997) and to post a career OBP of .359. By the mid-1990s, he had developed into one of the premier offensive players in the game, hitting over 40 home runs in three consecutive seasons (1995, 1996, and 1997), becoming just the tenth player to do so (and the first since Frank Howard in 1970).

== Retirement and legacy ==
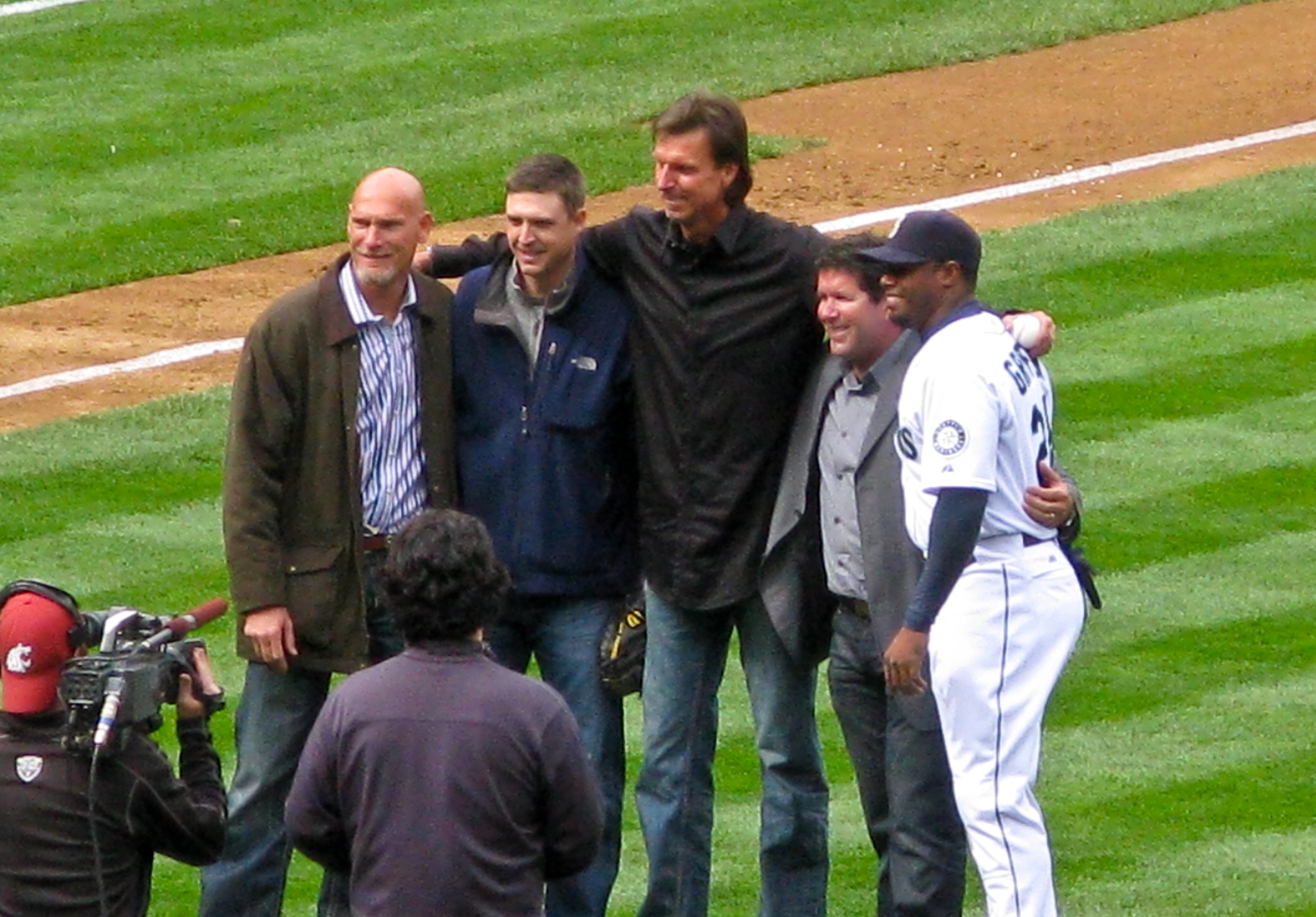
2010 Seattle Mariners home opener, From left to right: Buhner, Dan Wilson, Randy Johnson, Edgar Martínez, Ken Griffey Jr.

=== Mariners legacy ===
After a 116-win 2001 season, Buhner retired at age 37 in December of that year. In 2025, he became an analyst for Root Sports' TV coverage of the Mariners.

During his career, the Mariners hosted a popular promotion, "Buhner Buzz Night", where visitors would receive free admission in the right field seats if they had a shaved head. Free buzz cuts were provided for people who showed up with hair. Buhner himself participated in giving fans of all ages buzz cuts, which also included women. The club revived the promotion for its 30th anniversary in 2024, with Buhner giving catcher Cal Raleigh a buzz cut.

George Thorogood's song "Bad to the Bone" was used as Buhner's at-bat music during home games.

Although Buhner's jersey number 19 has not been issued since, it has not been officially retired, per the team's policy regarding retired numbers. The Mariners require a player to have spent at least five years with the team and be elected to the Hall of Fame or narrowly miss election after spending substantially his entire career with the team.

Buhner holds the Mariners' career record for strikeouts with 1,375 and is in the top 10 in many offensive categories. He ranks fifth in games played for the team. He also has the lowest career stolen base percentage of any MLB player since 1954 with at least four stolen bases: he stole six stolen bases and was caught stealing 24 times for a success rate of 20 percent. (Caught stealing counts are not complete until the 1954 season, when Major League Baseball began maintaining official records.)

=== 1988 trade and Seinfeld ===
Buhner's July 1988 trade from the Yankees to the Mariners, often considered one of the Yankees' worst and one of the Mariners' best trades in baseball history, was referenced on the television sitcom Seinfeld in the January 1996 episode "The Caddy". Yankees owner George Steinbrenner appears at the home of George Costanza's parents to mistakenly inform them that their son is dead. The only response from Frank Costanza (played by Jerry Stiller) is, "What the hell did you trade Jay Buhner for?! He had 30 home runs, over 100 RBIs last year! He's got a rocket for an arm… You don't know what the hell you're doing!" (Steinbrenner, voiced by Larry David, replies, "Well, Buhner was a good prospect, no question about it. But my baseball people love Ken Phelps's bat. They kept saying, 'Ken Phelps! Ken Phelps!'") The clip was played at Safeco Field when Buhner was inducted into the Mariners' Hall of Fame in August 2004.

=== Popularity in music ===
Buhner is the namesake of Korean-American k-pop idol, Jay Park, from the group Enhypen. He is referenced by Action Bronson in the song "Red Dot Music" by Mac Miller, where Bronson references their similarly shaved heads saying "my look is Jay Buhner."

== Personal life ==
Buhner and his family remained in the Seattle area, in Sammamish, following his playing career, but he retired to Texas after his children grew up. His son, Gunnar, played baseball for Lewis–Clark State College, for the Philadelphia Phillies' Gulf Coast League team in 2017, and in independent baseball until 2022.

== See also ==
- List of Major League Baseball career home run leaders
- List of Major League Baseball players to hit for the cycle

Achievements
Preceded by Mark Grace	Hitting for the cycle June 23, 1993	Succeeded by Travis Fryman
