= Ken Phelps =

American baseball player (born 1954)

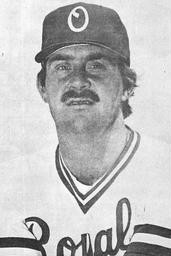
- Phelps in 1980
- Designated hitter / First baseman
- Born: August 6, 1954 (age 72); Seattle, Washington, U.S.
- Batted: Left Threw: Left

MLB debut
- September 20, 1980, for the Kansas City Royals

Last MLB appearance
- September 8, 1990, for the Cleveland Indians

MLB statistics
- Batting average: .239
- Home runs: 123
- Runs batted in: 313
- Stats at Baseball Reference

Teams
- Kansas City Royals (1980–1981); Montreal Expos (1982); Seattle Mariners (1983–1988); New York Yankees (1988–1989); Oakland Athletics (1989–1990); Cleveland Indians (1990)

Career highlights and awards
- World Series champion (1989)

Kenneth Allen Phelps (born August 6, 1954) is an American former professional baseball designated hitter and first baseman. He played for six different Major League Baseball (MLB) teams from 1980 to 1990, primarily with the Seattle Mariners. Baseball statistician Bill James cited Phelps as an example of a player who was unfairly denied a chance to play in the majors, despite compiling strong minor league statistics.

== Early years ==
Born and raised in Seattle, Washington, Phelps graduated from Ingraham High School in north Seattle in 1972. He played a year at Washington State in Pullman under Bobo Brayton, then headed to Mesa Community College, looking for an opportunity to play at Arizona State in Tempe.

In his only season at MCC in 1974, Phelps was named a junior college All-American. He was drafted twice in the first round (January and June drafts) by the New York Yankees and Philadelphia Phillies, respectively. He had previously been drafted out of high school by the Atlanta Braves in the eighth round (179th overall) of 1972 Major League Baseball draft.

All this earned Phelps a chance from Coach Jim Brock to play at ASU, where he was named to the College World Series All Star team in 1976, when the Sun Devils lost to rival Arizona after having defeated the Wildcats seven times that season, including a first-round game in Omaha.

== Professional career ==
=== Kansas City Royals and Montreal Expos ===
The left-hitting first baseman was selected by the Kansas City Royals in the 15th round (354th overall) of the 1976 Major League Baseball draft. Phelps hit a combined 43 home runs from 1980–81 for the Omaha Royals, KC's Triple-A affiliate in the American Association. On September 20, 1980, he made his major league debut against the Oakland Athletics, appearing as a defensive replacement in the seventh inning and grounding out in his only at bat. Phelps appeared in 24 career games with Kansas City, posting a .115 batting average and one RBI.

In January 1982, the Royals traded Phelps to the Montreal Expos in exchange for pitcher Grant Jackson. In the American Association in 1982, Phelps hit .333 with 46 home runs and 141 RBI in 132 games for the Triple-A Wichita Aeros. He had only eight major league at bats that year, as there was no room on a very talented Montreal roster for Phelps to break in. Instead, Phelps' hometown club, the Seattle Mariners, purchased him from the Expos on March 30, 1983.

=== Seattle Mariners ===
An average defensive player, Phelps was better suited to play with the Mariners, as he could serve as the designated hitter, and the struggling franchise also had plenty of room for advancement. Phelps split time in 1983 between Seattle and its Pacific Coast League farm club, the Triple-A Salt Lake City Bees. Again, he hit minor league pitching well (.341 with 24 home runs and 82 RBI in 74 games), but he did not play much in the majors (.236, seven home runs and 16 RBI in 50 games).

In 1984, Phelps played in 101 games, batting .241 while hitting 24 home runs and recording 51 RBI in only 290 at-bats. Bad luck intervened early that year when a pitch broke his hand in the third game of the season; he had won the regular first base job, and hit two home runs in his first three-game and had five hits in his first ten at-bats. The injury resulted in the call-up of first baseman Alvin Davis after just one game in Triple-A, who immediately produced; Davis was named to the American League All-Star team and was the league's Rookie of the Year.

The next season, Phelps found himself behind Davis at first and Gorman Thomas at DH, who had been signed as a free agent the previous season as an outfielder. He was limited to a mere 116 major league at bats, and hit just .207 with nine home runs and 24 RBI in 61 games.

In 1986 at the age 31, Phelps got into the major league lineup on a more-or-less regular basis. Although he was normally platooned against left-handed pitchers, Phelps still clocked 51 home runs from 1986–87. It was at this time that his career travails inspired author Bill James to create the "Ken Phelps All-Star" team. As James described it:

Ken Phelpses are just available; if you want one, all you have to do is ask. They are players whose real limitations are exaggerated by baseball insiders, players who get stuck with a label -- the label of their limits, the label the things they can't do -- while those that they can do are overlooked... The Ken Phelps All-Stars [are] a whole teamful of guys who are wearing labels, but who nonetheless can play major-league baseball, and will prove it if they ever get the chance.

=== The Buhner trade ===
Phelps batted .284 with 14 more home runs and 32 RBI in 72 games for Seattle in the first half of 1988. Impressed, owner George Steinbrenner of the New York Yankees traded Triple-A prospect Jay Buhner to Seattle in exchange for Phelps, despite already having Don Mattingly and Jack Clark to play first base and DH. With limited playing time, Phelps found it difficult to maintain his production of the previous four-and-a-half seasons, while Buhner went on to become an All-Star and legendary Mariners player. A Seinfeld episode in early 1996 ("The Caddy") depicted Yankee fan Frank Costanza (played by Jerry Stiller) as more upset about the Buhner trade than about the supposed death of his own son George. Phelps only hit 17 home runs for the Yankees before being traded to the Oakland Athletics for relief pitcher Scott Holcomb on August 31, 1989. The A's won the World Series, but Phelps had just two at bats in the post-season, with a pinch-hit double in the third game of the league championship series.

=== Final homer ===
Phelps' final home run might have been his most notable; it came with Oakland before a sell-out home crowd in 1990 on April 20, with two outs in the bottom of the ninth that Friday night. Phelps was called out of the dugout to pinch hit against Brian Holman of the Mariners, who had retired the first 26 batters in succession; he homered on the first pitch to ruin the perfect game.

Years later, Phelps said he wanted to hit it out because he did not want to watch himself on ESPN's SportsCenter all season making the out to complete Holman's gem. He was traded to the Cleveland Indians for cash considerations on June 17, 1990. In 1991, after playing seven games for the San Francisco Giants' Triple-A affiliate, the Phoenix Giants, Phelps retired from baseball at the age of 36.

=== Career summary ===
Phelps' career .239 batting average hides the things that, as James pointed out, he could do. Thanks to outstanding power and strike zone judgment, his career OPS is a strong .854. Phelps hit 123 home runs in 1,854 career at bats, and ranked in the top 10 in the American League at bats per home run four times in his career. Phelps hit his first 100 home runs in 1,322 at-bats — one of the fastest, as measured by at bats, in MLB history, behind Ryan Howard in 1,141 at-bats. Phelps held the AL record, later surpassed by Joey Gallo in 2019.

== After baseball ==
In 2004, Phelps did color commentary on the radio for Arizona Diamondbacks baseball games. He has since done baseball analysis for Fox Sports, along with community and media work for the state's largest electric utility, Arizona Public Service. Programs that Phelps has been involved with (The ABC's of Baseball, and Life and Power Players) have received national recognition for having positive impact on children.

== Notes ==
1. James, Bill (1987). The Bill James Baseball Abstract 1987. Ballantine: New York. p. 233. ISBN 0-345-34180-5.
