= Carlos Bernhardt =

Dominican baseball scout and coach

Carlos J. Bernhardt (born 1950) is a Dominican professional baseball scout long associated with the Baltimore Orioles of Major League Baseball. He also served the Orioles as their Major League first base coach on the staff of manager Ray Miller during the 1998 season.

Bernhardt, a native of San Pedro de Macorís, was briefly a pitcher in minor league baseball, appearing in 16 games in the Seattle Pilots (1969) and New York Yankees (1971) organizations. A right-hander, he stood 5 feet 11 inches (1.80 m) tall and weighed 165 pounds (75 kg).

He began scouting for the Orioles in 1985 and served as their chief scout in the Dominican Republic through 1997, resuming that assignment in 1999 after his year as a Major League coach. He was listed as a scout in the Dominican for the Orioles through 2012, his 28th year with the franchise.

Preceded by John Stearns	Baltimore Orioles first base coach 1998	Succeeded by Marv Foley
