= Kennedy High School (Illinois) =

Location
- 6325 West 56th Street; Chicago, Illinois 60638; United States; 41.79052°N 87.78010°W

Information
- Type: Public secondary
- Established: 1963
- School district: Chicago Public Schools
- CEEB code: 140897
- Principal: George Z. Szkapiak
- Grades: 9–12
- Gender: Coed
- Enrollment: 1,623 (2014–15)
- Colors: Royal Blue; Golden Yellow
- Athletics conference: Chicago Public League
- Team name: Crusaders
- Accreditation: North Central Association of Colleges and Schools
- Website: kennedyhschicago.org

John F. Kennedy High School is a public four-year high school located in the Garfield Ridge neighborhood on the southwest side of Chicago, Illinois, United States. Operated by Chicago Public Schools, Kennedy opened in 1963. The school is named in honor of the 35th President of the United States, John F. Kennedy (1917–1963). Kennedy is an Advancement Via Individual Determination (AVID) school. Since 2000, Kennedy has been a part of the International Baccalaureate Program.

== History ==
The school opened on October 3, 1963, as John H. Kinzie High School. The name was changed to the present one in 1965, to honor former President John F. Kennedy who was assassinated in the year of the school's founding.

== Athletics ==
Kennedy competes in the Chicago Public League (CPL) and is a member of the Illinois High School Association (IHSA). Kennedy varsity athletic teams are named the "Crusaders". The boys' baseball team won City Championship in 1969, and were Class AA and Public League Champions in 1977–78. Kennedy boys' cross country were Class AA eight times (1976–77, 1978–79, 1979–80, 1992–93, and 1997–2001) and public league champions in 1997–98. The girls' bowling team were public league champions five times (1974–75, 1975–76, 1982–83, 1983–84, and 1987–88).

- Fall: boys' soccer, girls' volleyball, football, cheerleading, boys' softball, girls' swimming, cross country
- Winter: boys' basketball, girls' basketball, indoor track, bowling, cheerleading, boys' swimming, wrestling
- Spring: girls' Softball, boys' baseball, girls' soccer, boys' volleyball, track and field, water polo

== Notable alumni ==
- Jim Hickey — Minor League Baseball player and Major League Baseball pitching coach
- Donell Jones – R&B singer
- Kathy Kelly – peace activist
- Mark Protosevich – screenwriter
- Jill Talley – comedic actress
- Gene Walter – MLB player
