= José Castro (baseball) =

Cuban-American baseball player & coach (born 1958)

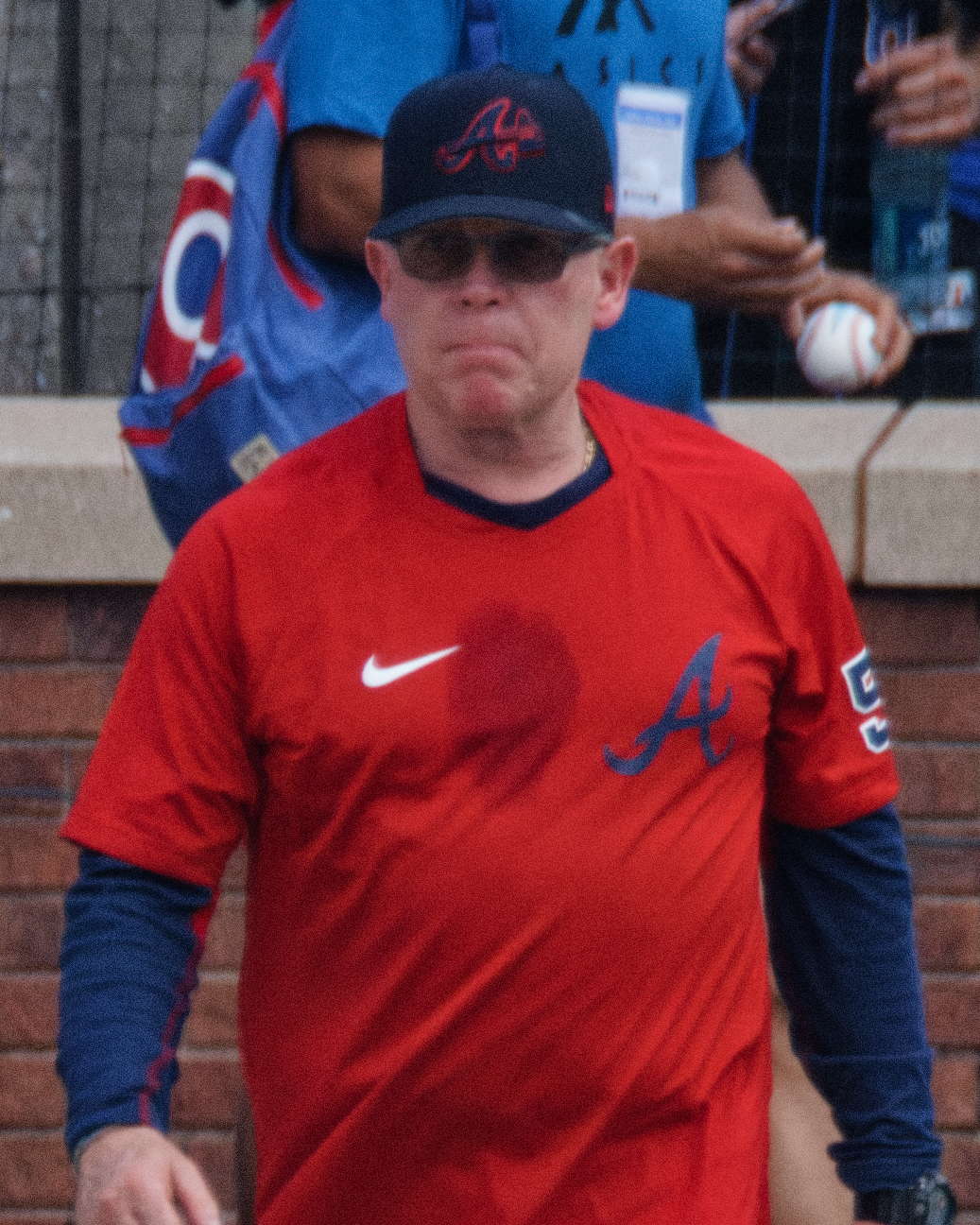
- Castro with the Braves in 2022
- Infielder / Coach
- Born: May 5, 1958 (age 67); Havana, Cuba
- Bats: Right Throws: Right
- Stats at Baseball Reference

Teams
- Seattle Mariners (2008); Chicago Cubs (2014); Atlanta Braves (2015–2022); Chicago White Sox (2023)

Career highlights and awards
- World Series champion (2021)

José Castro (born May 5, 1958) is a Cuban-American professional baseball coach. He was previously a coach for the Seattle Mariners, Chicago Cubs, Atlanta Braves, and Chicago White Sox.

== Career ==
Castro defected from Cuba with his family at the age of seven in 1965. Castro went to Miami Jackson Senior High School where they retired his number, "9". Signed out of high school by the Philadelphia Phillies in 1977, Castro played the minor leagues for 14 years, with 10 of these being at the Triple-A level. However, he never played in the majors. He went into coaching after ending his playing career.

Castro served as the hitting coach for the Montreal Expos Triple-A affiliate Edmonton Trappers in 2003, then the San Diego Padres Triple-A affiliate Portland Beavers in 2005 and 2006., He was named the Seattle Mariners roving minor league hitting instructor in December 2007.

Following Seattle Mariners manager John McLaren's firing on June 19, 2008, bench coach Jim Riggleman was promoted to the top spot, Lee Elia was moved from hitting coach to bench coach, and Castro became the new hitting coach for the team. On January 13, 2009, he was named the Mariners' minor league hitting coordinator. On August 9, 2010, Castro was promoted from hitting coach to interim manager of the Tacoma Rainiers, replacing Daren Brown. The Mariners had named Brown their manager after firing Don Wakamatsu earlier that day. He subsequently returned to the hitting coordinator role.

Before the 2013 season began, the Kansas City Royals named Castro their assistant minor league hitting coordinator. Castro spent the 2014 season with the Chicago Cubs as a quality assurance coach, and was subsequently hired by the Atlanta Braves as an assistant hitting coach.

On November 29, 2022, the Chicago White Sox hired Castro as their hitting coach for the 2023 season. He was fired after the season.

== Personal life ==
Castro is married and has two children and two grandchildren.
