= Dave Brundage =

American professional baseball manager

- Outfielder / Pitcher / Manager
- Born: October 6, 1964 (age 61); Portland, Oregon, U.S.
- Bats: Left Throws: Left
- Stats at Baseball Reference

David Charles Brundage (born October 6, 1964) is an American professional baseball manager. In 2017, Brundage spent his first season as manager of the Sacramento River Cats, Triple-A affiliate of the San Francisco Giants.

His debut season with Sacramento, his first in the Giants' organization, marked Brundage's 12th consecutive season as a manager at the Triple-A level and 20th year as a skipper in the minor leagues. Previously, he spent four seasons (2013–16) at the helm of the Lehigh Valley IronPigs in the Philadelphia Phillies' organization. He led the 2016 IronPigs to an 85–58 record, the second-best mark in Triple-A.

Brundage attended McKay High School in Salem, Oregon, and Oregon State University. He was selected by the Phillies in the fourth round of the 1986 Major League Baseball draft but never reached the Major League Baseball (MLB). Primarily an outfielder—although he appeared in 39 games as a pitcher—his playing career lasted for eight seasons in the Philadelphia and Seattle Mariners' organizations. He had been traded along with Glenn Wilson and Mike Jackson from the Phillies to the Mariners for Phil Bradley and Tim Fortugno at the Winter Meetings on December 9, 1987. He batted .275 with 683 hits and compiled a 1–5 won/lost mark on the mound with an earned run average of 3.83. Brundage threw and batted left-handed, stood 6 ft 3 in (1.91 m) tall and weighed 190 lb (86 kg).

His managerial career began in the Seattle organization in 1995 in the California League, but he has spent much of his career at higher levels of the minors, including six years at Double-A with Seattle affiliates in the Southern and Texas leagues, and 11 seasons at Triple-A with the Tacoma Rainiers (2006), Richmond/Gwinnett Braves (2007–12), and the IronPigs. His 2007 Richmond team won the International League championship. He also was Tacoma's batting coach from 1998 to 2000.

His 19-season win–loss record as a manager through 2016 was 1,371–1,315 (.510).

Brundage is married to Dameron, with whom he raised three children.

Preceded by Ed Romero	Memphis Chicks manager 1997	Succeeded by Franchise replaced by Memphis Redbirds (PCL)
Preceded by Rick Burleson	San Antonio Missions manager 2001–2005	Succeeded by Daren Brown
Preceded by Dan Rohn	Tacoma Rainiers manager 2006	Succeeded by Daren Brown
Preceded by Brian Snitker	Richmond Braves manager 2007–2008	Succeeded by Franchise transferred
Preceded by Franchise established	Gwinnett Braves manager 2009–2012	Succeeded by Randy Ready
Preceded by Ryne Sandberg	Lehigh Valley IronPigs manager 2013–2016	Succeeded by Dusty Wathan
Preceded by José Alguacil	Sacramento River Cats manager 2017	Succeeded by Incumbent
