= Marv Foley =

American baseball player (born 1953)

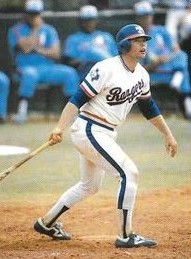
- Catcher
- Born: August 29, 1953 (age 72); Stanford, Kentucky, U.S.
- Batted: Left Threw: Right

MLB debut
- September 11, 1978, for the Chicago White Sox

Last MLB appearance
- September 30, 1984, for the Texas Rangers

MLB statistics
- Batting average: .224
- Home runs: 12
- Runs batted in: 51
- Stats at Baseball Reference

Teams
- Chicago White Sox (1978–1980, 1982); Texas Rangers (1984)

Marvis Edwin Foley (born August 29, 1953) is an American former Major League Baseball (MLB) catcher and coach, and minor league manager. He played for the Chicago White Sox and Texas Rangers in all or part of five seasons between 1978 and 1984, went on to serve as a catching instructor for the Colorado Rockies, and is the only manager ever to win league championships in all three major Triple-A leagues (International League, American Association and Pacific Coast League).

== Playing career ==
=== Early career ===
Foley played college baseball at the University of Kentucky. In 1974 he played collegiate summer baseball with the Falmouth Commodores of the Cape Cod Baseball League and was named a league all-star.

In 1975, the Chicago White Sox drafted Foley in the 17th round of the 1975 MLB draft. He was originally assigned to the Class-A Appleton Foxes, but was promoted to the Double-A Knoxville Sox after just six games. He batted .293 at Knoxville in 51 games, and in 1976 he opened the season there again.

Foley's statistics declined somewhat in 1976, with his batting average dropping to .251 in his first full professional season. In 1977, Foley split the season between Appleton (48 games), Knoxville (66 games), and the Triple-A Iowa Oaks (10 games). Across all three levels, he batted .282 with 10 home runs. In 1978, he played the whole season at Iowa, batting .275.

=== Major league career ===
==== White Sox ====
===== 1978 =====
After the Triple-A season ended, Foley was given his first taste of major league action. He made his debut on September 11, 1978, against the Minnesota Twins. He pinch-hit for starting catcher Mike Colbern in the ninth inning, grounding out against pitcher Mike Marshall. He played in a total of 11 games that season, batting .353 in 34 at bats.

===== 1979 =====
Foley started the 1979 season with the White Sox, splitting time as their primary catcher with Bill Nahorodny. On May 27, the White Sox purchased Milt May from the Detroit Tigers, and Foley, who was batting .235, was sent down to Iowa. He returned to the White Sox in September, finishing the season with a .247 average, 2 home runs, and 10 RBI.

===== 1980 =====
Foley started the season with the White Sox in 1980, but again struggled at the plate, batting just .181 through July 3. He was demoted to the minors, splitting the next two months between Iowa and the Double-A Glens Falls White Sox. For the third season in a row, he returned to the majors in September, and by the end of the season he had brought his average up to .212, and had set new career highs with 4 home runs and 15 RBI.

===== 1981–83 =====
In 1981, Foley opened the season in the minor leagues for the first time in three seasons. He spent the full season with the White Sox' new Triple-A affiliate, the Edmonton Trappers, where he batted .296 and a professional best of 11 home runs.

In 1982, Foley was back in the majors, but as the White Sox' third-string catcher behind Carlton Fisk and Marc Hill. He appeared in 27 games, with 36 at bats, in which he batted .111 with one RBI.

In 1983, it was back to Triple-A, again with a new White Sox affiliate, the Denver Bears. This time, he had what would be his best batting average in a full Triple-A season at .319, and he hit double digits in home runs with 10. However, after the season ended, he was allowed to become a minor league free agent.

==== Rangers ====
A month later, Foley signed a contract with the Texas Rangers. In 1984, Foley played a full season in the majors for the second time, splitting time at catcher with Donnie Scott and Ned Yost. On the last game of the season, he made the final out of Mike Witt's perfect game. Pinch-hitting for Curtis Wilkerson, he grounded out to second to end the game. He is the only player in MLB history to make the last out of a perfect game in his last MLB at bat.

While he batted .217 in 1984, he established personal major-league bests with 6 home runs and 19 RBI. After the season, he was released by the Rangers.

=== Back in the minors ===
Foley signed on with the Detroit Tigers shortly after his release, but never played for them at any level. Instead, he wound up back with the White Sox. He split the next two seasons between Double-A and Triple-A in their organization before his playing career ended following the 1986 season at age 32.

== Post-playing career ==
=== White Sox organization ===
During his final two seasons in the minors, Foley served as a player-coach. In 1987, he was named manager of the Peninsula White Sox, and in 1988 he was promoted to the High-A Tampa White Sox. That season, he was named Florida State League Manager of the Year after leading Tampa into the playoffs, where they lost in the first round.

In 1989, Foley was again promoted, this time to Triple-A, with yet another new White Sox' affiliate, the Vancouver Canadians of the Pacific Coast League. This time, he led the team to the league championship, defeating the Albuquerque Dukes in the finals. Foley managed the next season at Vancouver as well, but after starting the 1991 season with a 24–39 record, he was replaced by Moe Drabowsky on May 15.

=== Cubs organization ===
Prior to the 1992 season, Foley was hired by the Chicago Cubs to manage their Double-A affiliate, the Charlotte Knights. He managed the team into the playoffs, but lost in the first round. In 1993, he was moved up to the Triple-A Iowa Cubs of the American Association. After finishing the season in first place with an 85–59 record, the I-Cubs won the league championship over the Nashville Sounds—yet another new Triple-A affiliate of the White Sox. In 1994, Foley returned to the majors, serving as the Cubs' bullpen coach.

=== Orioles organization ===
Following the 1994 season, Foley moved on to the Baltimore Orioles organization, and once again was managing in the minor leagues. He started out the 1995 season with the Triple-A Rochester Red Wings of the International League, and the team made the playoffs in each of Foley's first three seasons as manager.

In 1997, Foley would achieve what no other minor league manager has achieved before or since when the Red Wings won the International League championship, winning in the finals over the Columbus Clippers. The win gave Foley championships in all three major Triple-A leagues. To date, he is the only manager to do so, and since the American Association ceased to exist after the 1997 season, he may remain so indefinitely.

Foley managed the Red Wings again in 1998, but the team finished in fourth place, out of the playoffs. In 1999, Foley had his second stint as a coach in the majors, coaching at first base for the Orioles. He returned to manage Rochester in 2000, this time finishing fifth, before spending a season as the Orioles' roving minor league catching instructor.

=== Rockies organization ===
After being let go by the Orioles, Foley spent a season in the independent leagues, managing the Newark Bears of the Atlantic League in 2002, guiding the team to the league championship. He was hired by the Colorado Rockies to manage their Double-A team, the Tulsa Drillers, prior to the 2003 season. After one season in Tulsa, he managed the next two seasons for the Triple-A Colorado Springs Sky Sox. Since 2006, Foley has served as the Rockies' minor league catching coordinator.

== Sources ==
- Career statistics from MLB · Baseball Reference · Baseball Reference (Minors) · Retrosheet · Baseball Almanac

Preceded by Bob Bailey	Peninsula White Sox Manager; 1987	Succeeded by last manager
Preceded by Bob Bailey	Tampa White Sox Manager; 1988	Succeeded by last manager
Preceded by Terry Bevington	Vancouver Canadians Manager; 1989–1991	Succeeded by Moe Drabowsky
Preceded by Jay Loviglio	Charlotte Knights Manager; 1992	Succeeded by Charlie Manuel
Preceded by Brad Mills	Iowa Cubs Manager; 1993	Succeeded by Rick Patterson
Preceded by Tony Muser	Chicago Cubs Bullpen Coach; 1994	Succeeded by Dave Bialas
Preceded by Bob Miscik	Rochester Red Wings Manager; 1995–1998	Succeeded by Dave Machemer
Preceded by Carlos Bernhardt	Baltimore Orioles First Base Coach; 1999	Succeeded by Eddie Murray
Preceded by Dave Machemer	Rochester Red Wings Manager; 2000	Succeeded by Andy Etchebarren
Preceded by Tim Ireland	Tulsa Drillers Manager; 2003	Succeeded by Tom Runnells
Preceded by Rick Sofield	Colorado Springs Sky Sox Manager; 2004–2005	Succeeded by Tom Runnells
