= Jim Hickey (baseball, born 1961) =

American baseball coach (born 1961)

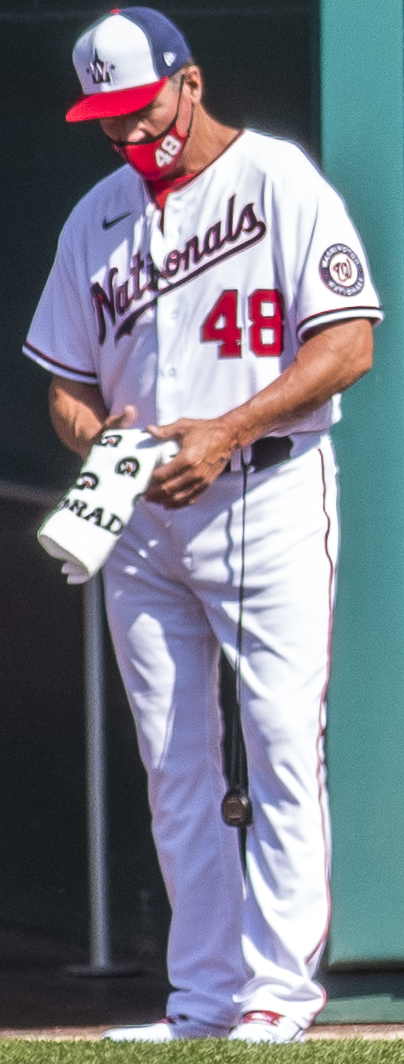
- Hickey with the Nationals in 2021
- Coach
- Born: October 12, 1961 (age 65); Chicago, Illinois, U.S.
- Stats at Baseball Reference

Teams
- As coach: Houston Astros (2004–2006); Tampa Bay Devil Rays / Rays (2007–2017); Chicago Cubs (2018); Washington Nationals (2021–2025)

James Joseph Hickey (born October 12, 1961) is an American professional baseball pitching coach. Hickey was the previously the pitching coach for the Tampa Bay Rays, Chicago Cubs, Houston Astros and Washington Nationals.

== Career ==
=== Playing career ===
After graduating from Kennedy High School in Chicago, Illinois, Hickey played college baseball for the University of Texas–Pan American. He was a first-team All-American in 1983. He went 16–2 in 19 starts with a 1.66 earned run average (ERA) and helped his team win 64 games, a school record. That season, his senior year, his 16 victories led all NCAA baseball. In that season, of his 19 starts he recorded 16 complete games; those 16 complete games were the third largest single season total in NCAA history at the time, and still rank 4th all-time. While at Pan American he was a member of Phi Sigma Kappa fraternity.

The Chicago White Sox selected Hickey in the 13th round of the 1983 MLB draft. His best career season was in 1984, when he went 13–5 and had a 1.81 ERA in 49 relief appearances for the Single-A Appleton Foxes who were the champions of the Midwest League that year. He played in the White Sox' minor leagues from 1983 to 1987. In 1988, Hickey pitched for the Double-A San Antonio Missions in the Los Angeles Dodgers organization. In 1989, he played for the Double-A Columbus Mudcats in the Houston Astros organization in the final year of his playing career.

=== Coaching career ===
Starting in 1996, Hickey became the pitching coach for two seasons at the Houston Astros' Double-A affiliate, the Jackson Generals, where his staff led the Texas League with 939 strikeouts in 1997.

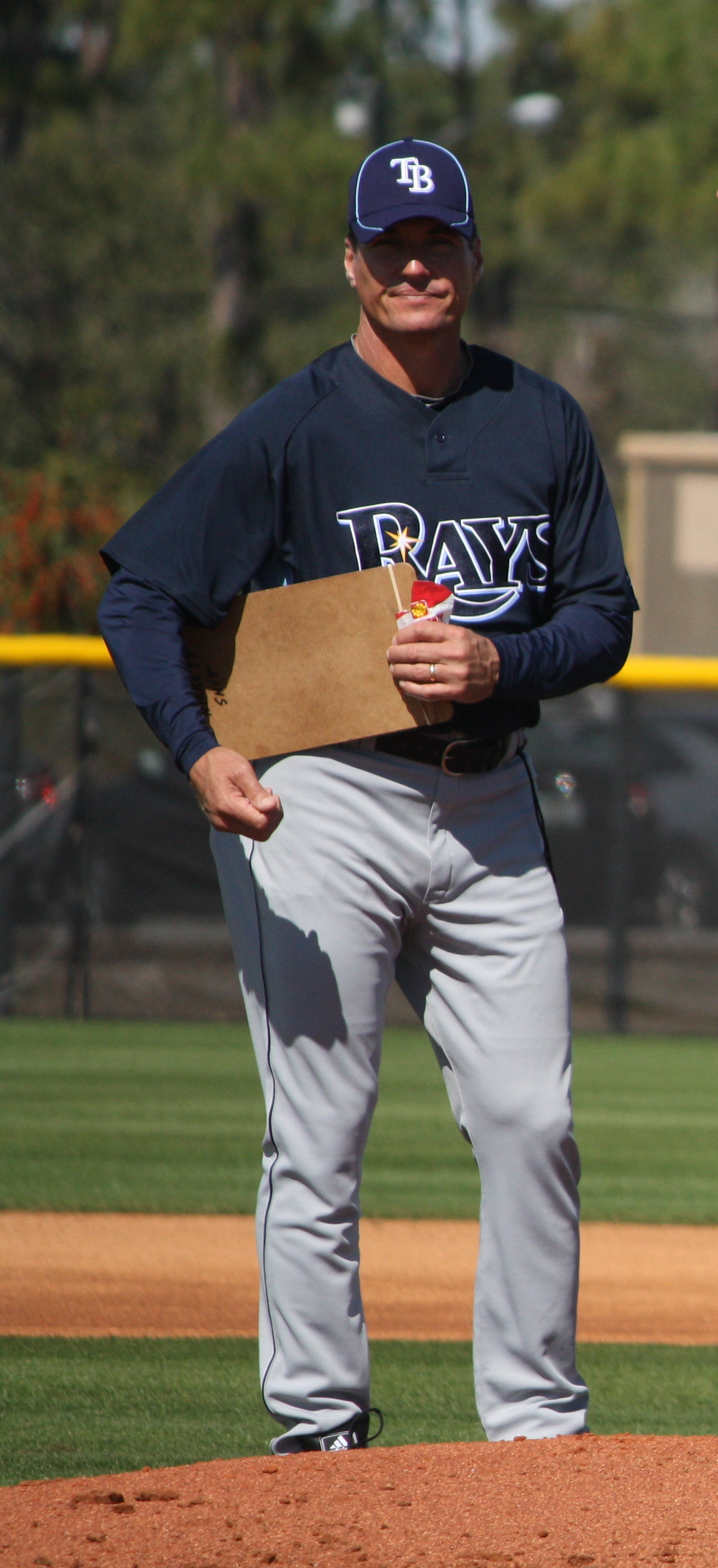
Hickey during 2010 spring training

In 1998, Hickey was promoted to pitching coach for the Astros' Triple-A affiliate, the New Orleans Zephyrs. That year, the Zephyrs won the first-ever Triple-A World Series, pitting the Pacific Coast League (PCL) champion against the International League champion. In 2001, the Zephyrs had the second-best ERA in the PCL (3.75 to Tacoma's 3.74) en route to the Pacific Coast League championship. In 2002, Hickey was named a coach for the All-Star Futures Game in Milwaukee and also was a member of the coaching staff for the Triple-A All-Star Game. At the end of the 2002 season, he was named the Astros Player Development Man of the Year. In 2002 and 2003, Hickey's pitching staff led the PCL in ERA with a 3.40 mark and a league-leading 11 shutouts.

Hickey was announced as the interim pitching coach for Houston on July 14, 2004, and was named the full-time pitching coach in October 2004 after 14 seasons as a pitching coach in their minor leagues and seven with the Zephyrs.

In his first year with Houston, he helped the pitching staff which included Roger Clemens, Brad Lidge, Roy Oswalt and Brandon Backe advance to the 2004 National League Championship Series. In 2005, the Astros advanced to the World Series, with Clemens (1st), Andy Pettitte (2nd), and Roy Oswalt (7th) in the National League in ERA. Houston was also second overall in the NL with a 3.51 ERA in 2005, and led the league with the fewest runs and walks allowed.

On November 18, 2006, Hickey was announced as the new pitching coach for the Tampa Bay Rays, replacing Mike Butcher. After the 2017 regular season, the Tampa Bay Rays and Hickey parted ways.

In the 2017 offseason, Hickey joined the Chicago Cubs as their pitching coach, coming along with two new coaches. Hickey reunited with manager Joe Maddon as the two were together at Tampa Bay until 2014. Hickey replaced Chris Bosio, who had been with the Cubs the past six seasons. Hickey did not return to the Cubs after the 2018 season. In May 2019, Hickey joined the Los Angeles Dodgers as a special assistant in player development.

In October 2020 it was announced that Hickey would join the Washington Nationals as their pitching coach for the 2021 season.

Sporting positions
Preceded by Burt Hooton	Houston Astros pitching coach 2004–2006	Succeeded by Dave Wallace
Preceded by Mike Butcher	Tampa Bay Devil Rays/Tampa Bay Rays pitching coach 2007–2017	Succeeded by Kyle Snyder
Preceded by Chris Bosio	Chicago Cubs pitching coach 2018	Succeeded by Tommy Hottovy
