= Jim Snyder (second baseman) =

American baseball player (1932–2021)

- Second baseman
- Born: August 15, 1932; Dearborn, Michigan, U.S.
- Died: March 9, 2021 (aged 88); Lutz, Florida, U.S.
- Batted: Right Threw: Right

MLB debut
- September 15, 1961, for the Minnesota Twins

Last MLB appearance
- August 2, 1964, for the Minnesota Twins

MLB statistics
- Batting average: .140
- Home runs: 1
- Runs batted in: 10
- Managerial record: 45–60 (.429)
- Stats at Baseball Reference
- Managerial record at Baseball Reference

Teams
- As player: Minnesota Twins (1961–1962, 1964); As manager: Seattle Mariners (1988); As coach: Chicago Cubs (1987); Seattle Mariners (1988); San Diego Padres (1991–1992)

James Robert Snyder (August 15, 1932 – March 9, 2021) was an American professional baseball player, coach and manager. He managed the 1988 Seattle Mariners for 105 games, from June 6 until the end of the season. He played as a second baseman for 41 games for the Minnesota Twins over three seasons (1961, 1962, and 1964). He threw and batted right-handed, stood 6 feet 1 inch (1.85 m) tall and weighed 185 pounds (84 kg) during his 12-year playing career. He then coached and managed professionally for decades, working as an MLB coach for the Chicago Cubs and San Diego Padres.

Born in Dearborn, Michigan, Snyder attended Eastern Michigan University, earning bachelor's and master's degrees. In 1952, he signed with the St. Louis Browns and played in several minor league organizations. He was traded by the Philadelphia Phillies to the Chicago White Sox for Bobby Winkles in July 1958. After three seasons with the Triple-A Indianapolis Indians, the Twins acquired Snyder in September 1961. As a 29-year-old rookie, he went hitless in five at bats that month, then notched one hit in ten at bats during an early-season 1962 trial with Minnesota. He did not return to the majors until June 1964, when the Twins gave him a 26-game audition, ending his MLB tenure in August. He batted .140 in 86 MLB at bats, including one home run, hit July 15, 1964, off Don Rudolph of the Washington Senators.

In 1966, Snyder began his managerial career in the farm system of the Cincinnati Reds, where over 11 years he rose from Class A Short Season to Triple-A Indianapolis in 1976. Snyder then spent five seasons as a manager in the Philadelphia Phillies' organization, including two years at Triple-A with the Oklahoma City 89ers. In 1982, he was among several Phillies' instructors and scouts who accompanied Dallas Green to the Chicago Cubs' system, where Snyder was field coordinator of instruction from 1982 to 1986 and an MLB coach in 1987.

During that offseason, Snyder joined the Mariners' 1988 staff as first base coach for future Hall of Fame manager Dick Williams. With the Mariners at 23–33 on June 6, and Williams under fire for lack of communication with his players, Snyder was promoted to acting manager. Weathering a 1–12 patch from June 8–21, Seattle played marginally better (.429 vs. .411 managed by Williams) in four months under Snyder, yet the Mariners finished last in the American League West. The Mariners fired him at the end of the season, replacing him with Jim Lefebvre.

Snyder then spent his first term as coordinator of instruction for the Chicago White Sox in 1989 and 1990, returning to the big leagues as a coach for San Diego Padres' manager Greg Riddoch in 1991 and 1992. He filled in as manager when Riddoch attended a family graduation. After working as a minor-league coach in the Atlanta Braves' system in 1993, Snyder rejoined the White Sox as director of instruction in 1994, working for the team through 2008.

== Personal life and death ==
Snyder died on March 9, 2021, in Lutz, Florida. He was married and has four children.
