= Mario Díaz (baseball) =

Puerto Rican baseball player (born 1962)

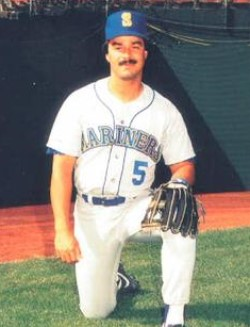
- Infielder
- Born: January 10, 1962 (age 64); Humacao, Puerto Rico
- Batted: Right Threw: Right

MLB debut
- September 12, 1987, for the Seattle Mariners

Last MLB appearance
- October 1, 1995, for the Florida Marlins

MLB statistics
- Batting average: .256
- Home runs: 5
- Runs batted in: 84
- Stats at Baseball Reference

Teams
- Seattle Mariners (1987–1989); New York Mets (1990); Texas Rangers (1991–1993); Florida Marlins (1994–1995)

Mario Rafael Díaz Torres (born January 10, 1962) is a Puerto Rican former Major League Baseball (MLB) infielder. He played from 1987 to 1995.

Díaz signed at the age of 17 with the Seattle Mariners in 1979, the year he graduated from Teodoro Aguilar Mora High School in Yabucoa, Puerto Rico. He led the Southern League with 14 sacrifice hits in 1985. In his first MLB at bat on September 12, 1987, he recorded his first major league hit, a triple, off of Bob James of the Chicago White Sox. As a September call-up, he had a .304 batting average in 11 games. He hit .306 in 28 games with the Mariners in 1988. He made his second consecutive Opening Day roster in 1989, hitting his first MLB home run off Mike Witt of the California Angels on April 9. He began the 1990 season on the disabled list with a biceps injury.

In June 1990, Seattle traded Díaz to the New York Mets for Brian Givens while both players were in Triple-A. Díaz played 16 games for the Mets that summer as an injury replacement for Kevin Elster.

Díaz signed with the Texas Rangers and played in a career-high 96 games in 1991, his first season without playing in the minors. He participated in spring training with the Milwaukee Brewers in 1992 but was released, playing in the minors in the Mariners organization in April and May before returning to the Rangers. He hit .335 in 43 games in the majors. He began 1993 in Triple-A, rejoining the Rangers in June.

In 1994, Díaz was released in spring training by the Florida Marlins, then played for the minor league Pawtucket Red Sox before signing with the Marlins. Again, he was primarily a bench player, batting a career-best .325 in 32 games. He returned to the Marlins in 1995, his final season in the majors.

Díaz played in Triple-A in 1996, the Mexican Baseball League in 1997, and the Nashua Pride of the independent Atlantic League in 1998 and 1999.

== Personal life ==
Díaz and his wife have two daughters, born in 1989 and 1993.
