= Terry Taylor (baseball) =

American baseball player (born 1964)

- Pitcher
- Born: July 28, 1964 (age 62); Crestview, Florida, U.S.
- Batted: Right Threw: Right

MLB debut
- August 19, 1988, for the Seattle Mariners

Last MLB appearance
- September 20, 1988, for the Seattle Mariners

MLB statistics
- Win–loss record: 0–1
- Earned run average: 6.26
- Strikeouts: 9
- Stats at Baseball Reference

Teams
- Seattle Mariners (1988)

Terry Derrell Taylor (born July 28, 1964) is an American former professional baseball pitcher. He played for the Seattle Mariners of Major League Baseball (MLB) in 1988. He made his MLB debut on August 19 and appeared in his final MLB game on September 20.

== Career ==
The Seattle Mariners drafted Taylor in the fourth round of the 1982 Major League Baseball draft out of Crestview High School in Crestview, Florida. He suffered biceps tendonitis in 1984. He led the Southern League with 164 strikeouts in 1986. He was called up the majors after finishing the 1987 Triple-A season with the Calgary Cannons. He made five starts for the Mariners. Before the start of the 1989 season, he had shoulder surgery. He pitched in the minors through 1991, then played two seasons in the Mexican Baseball League.

Taylor was inducted into the Crestview High School sports hall of fame in 2012.

== Personal life ==
Taylor's father played in the Cincinnati Reds minor league system.
