= John Rabb =

American baseball player (born 1960)

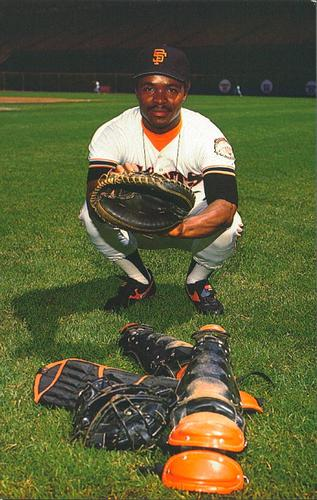
- Catcher
- Born: June 23, 1960 (age 65); Los Angeles, California, U.S.
- Batted: Right Threw: Right

MLB debut
- September 4, 1982, for the San Francisco Giants

Last MLB appearance
- July 31, 1988, for the Seattle Mariners

MLB statistics
- Batting average: .225
- Home runs: 4
- Runs batted in: 27
- Stats at Baseball Reference

Teams
- San Francisco Giants (1982–1984); Atlanta Braves (1985); Seattle Mariners (1988)

John Andrew Rabb (born June 23, 1960) is an American former professional baseball player. A catcher, his career extended for 14 seasons (1978–1991), and he spent 108 games in one full season (1984} and parts of four others (1982–1983; 1985; 1988) in Major League Baseball, mostly for the San Francisco Giants.

== Career ==
A right-handed batter and thrower, the 6 ft 1 in (1.85 m), 185 lb (84 kg) Rabb was selected by the Giants in the 11th round of the 1978 Major League Baseball draft from Washington Preparatory High School. He had a brief trial with the Giants in 1982 after hitting 22 home runs for Triple-A Phoenix, then was returned to the minor leagues to begin 1983. A hot start in the Pacific Coast League — 51 runs batted in, ten homers, and a .343 batting average in 62 games — earned him a June call-up to San Francisco. He backed up regular catcher Bob Brenly for the remainder of 1983 and all of 1984, but hit poorly (.215 in 186 at bats). The Giants traded Rabb to the Atlanta Braves for another catcher, Alex Treviño, prior to the 1985 season. But Rabb spent much of the campaign with the Richmond Braves and got into only three games for Atlanta at the end of the season, plus nine more for 1988 Seattle Mariners, to culminate his MLB career.

In the Majors, Rabb's 46 hits included 12 doubles, one triple and four home runs. But in the minor leagues, he belted 173 home runs (not counting his service in the Triple-A Mexican League), and exceeded the 19-homer mark seven times in a dozen seasons.
