= Mike Jackson (right-handed pitcher) =

American baseball player (born 1964)

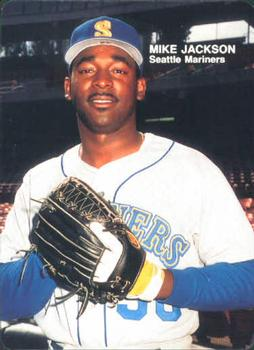
- Jackson with the Seattle Mariners in 1988
- Pitcher
- Born: December 22, 1964 (age 61); Houston, Texas, U.S.
- Batted: Right Threw: Right

MLB debut
- August 11, 1986, for the Philadelphia Phillies

Last MLB appearance
- August 29, 2004, for the Chicago White Sox

MLB statistics
- Win–loss record: 62–67
- Earned run average: 3.42
- Strikeouts: 1,006
- Saves: 142
- Stats at Baseball Reference

Teams
- Philadelphia Phillies (1986–1987); Seattle Mariners (1988–1991); San Francisco Giants (1992–1994); Cincinnati Reds (1995); Seattle Mariners (1996); Cleveland Indians (1997–1999); Houston Astros (2001); Minnesota Twins (2002); Chicago White Sox (2004)

Michael Ray Jackson (born December 22, 1964) is an American former professional baseball player whose career spanned 19 seasons, 17 of which were spent in Major League Baseball (MLB). Jackson, a relief pitcher for the majority of his career, compiled a career earned run average (ERA) of 3.42, allowing 451 earned runs off of 983 hits, 127 home runs, and 464 walks while recording 1,006 strikeouts over 1,005 games pitched.

Standing 6 feet 1 inch (185 cm) and weighing 185 pounds (84 kg), he made his professional debut in 1984 for the minor-league Spartanburg Suns, an affiliate of the Philadelphia Phillies. After battling arm injuries in the early 1990s, Jackson reestablished himself as a top relief pitcher for the Reds in 1995 and went on to pitch in the 1997 World Series for the Indians, for whom he then served as the full-time closer in 1998 and 1999. After one-year stints with the Astros, Twins, and White Sox, Jackson retired from baseball in 2005.

== Early life ==
Jackson was born on December 22, 1964, in Houston, Texas. He attended high school at Forest Brook and college at Hill College.

== Career ==
=== Philadelphia Phillies (1984–1987) ===
Jackson entered the Major League Baseball draft in 1983 where he was selected by the Philadelphia Phillies in the 29th round. He did not sign with the Phillies, and reentered the draft in 1984 where was again drafted by the Phillies in the second round of the January Secondary amateur draft. Jackson signed a $60,000 contract with the club on April 27, 1984.

Jackson began playing minor league baseball for the single-A Spartanburg Suns, a minor league affiliate of the Phillies, in 1984. Over 80.2 innings pitched, Jackson recorded an earned run average (ERA) of 2.68, third best on his team. While batting, he recorded the best batting average and slugging percentage on the team, hitting .368 and slugging .526.

Jackson continued his minor league career in 1985, playing for the Peninsula Pilots of the Carolina League. Unlike the previous year where he started all 14 games he pitched, Jackson roughly split the 1985 season between starting games and serving as a reliever, starting 18 games but pitching in 31. For the season, Jackson led the Pilots in losses, with nine, while allowing the most hits, runs, and earned runs among team members.

In 1986, he played in three different leagues: Double-A, Triple-A, and in the Major Leagues. In Double-A, Jackson played for the Reading Phillies, recording a 1.66 ERA over 43.1 innings pitched. He played Triple-A ball for the Portland Beavers before making his major league debut for the Philadelphia Phillies on August 11, 1986. For his debut, Jackson pitched a perfect inning in relief of Dan Schatzeder in a game against the New York Mets. Jackson finished the 1986 Major League season with a 3.38 ERA, allowing five runs off of 12 hits and becoming the seventh youngest player in the National League that year.

Jackson played almost the entire 1987 season for the Philadelphia Phillies, also making two starts for the Maine Guides. During the season, he compiled a 4.20 ERA with three wins and 10 losses. He was traded along with Glenn Wilson and Dave Brundage from the Phillies to the Seattle Mariners for Phil Bradley and Tim Fortugno at the Winter Meetings on December 9, 1987. Author Rich Westcott would later call Jackson "a good one who got away" in reference to the Phillies trade.

=== Seattle Mariners (1988–1991) ===
From 1988 to 1991, Jackson played for the Seattle Mariners. In 1988 and 1989, Jackson finished in the top ten in the American League for most games pitched, with 62 and 65, respectively, while recording a 2.90 ERA over 198.2 innings pitched for the two seasons. In 1991, while facing the Kansas City Royals, he allowed Stu Cole's only Major League hit while pitching in the bottom of the 13th inning.

After spending four seasons with the Mariners, Jackson was traded, along with Bill Swift and Dave Burba, to the San Francisco Giants in return for outfielder Kevin Mitchell and pitcher Mike Remlinger. This trade received criticism, being called "possibly the worst trade in [Mariners] history."

=== San Francisco Giants (1992–1994) ===
Jackson, now with a salary of $1,666,667, made his debut for the Giants on April 7, 1992, in a game against the Los Angeles Dodgers. Jackson allowed one walk in one inning pitched, while finishing the 1992 season with a 3.73 ERA, 80 strikeouts, and one save. He led his team in games pitched, with 67, the second highest total in his Giants career.

In 1993, he led the Major Leagues in games pitched, with 81, while also leading the Majors in holds, with 33. The 1994 MLB season was shortened to 115 games for the Giants; however, over 36 games pitched, Jackson led National League relievers in ERA (1.49), opponents average (.164), and hits per 9.0 innings pitched (4.9) while finishing second in strikeouts per 9.0 innings pitched (10.84). The already shortened season was again shortened for Jackson due to tendinitis in his right elbow. This led to two stints on the disabled list: one from June 17 until July 2, and another from July 6 until the end of the season. On October 17, 1994, Jackson was granted free agency.

=== Cincinnati Reds (1995) ===
Jackson signed with the Cincinnati Reds on April 8, 1995. Again he struggled with injury, and was placed on the disabled list once for tendinitis in his right shoulder and once for a strained rib cage muscle. In his only year with the club, Jackson posted a team-best 2.39 ERA, while recording 41 strikeouts over 40 games. Jackson and the Reds made the playoffs, winning the National League Divisional Series but losing the National League Championship Series to the Atlanta Braves in four games. Jackson was granted free agency on November 3, 1995.

=== Seattle Mariners (1996) ===
In 1996, Jackson signed a $1.2 million contract, which included a $400,000 earned bonus, with the Seattle Mariners. Jackson averaged nearly nine strikeouts per 9.0 innings pitched (70 strikeouts/72.0 innings pitched). After the season, Baseball Digest called Jackson "a competent and underappreciated setup man". The Mariners did not re-sign Jackson, on the grounds that Jackson's new contract would be too expensive.

=== Cleveland Indians (1997–1999) ===
In 1997, Jackson signed a three-year, $6 million contract with the Cleveland Indians. Jackson served as closer for part of the season, but returned to setup when José Mesa reclaimed the closer's role. Finishing the year with an 86–75 record, the Indians finished first in the American League Central and made the playoffs. After winning against the New York Yankees in the American League Divisional Series (ALDS) and the Baltimore Orioles in the American League Championship Series (ALCS), the Indians played in the World Series against the Florida Marlins. In the World Series, Jackson recorded an ERA of 1.93 over four games pitched, although the Indians lost the World Series, four games to three.

Jackson became the Indians' primary closer in 1998, recording 40 saves over 64.0 innings pitched and leading the team in games finished, saves, and games pitched. The Indians again made the postseason, but were eliminated by the New York Yankees in the ALCS.

Jackson finished the 1999 season with Cleveland, ranking fourth in the American League in saves, with 39. Jackson recorded his 100th career save against the Minnesota Twins on April 11, and made his 800th career appearance on July 3 against the Kansas City Royals before he was granted free agency on October 28 of that year.

=== 2000 onward ===
Jackson signed with the Phillies in 2000 but did not pitch due to discomfort in his right shoulder the first time Jackson warmed up to pitch in a game for Philadelphia. On May 26, Jackson had season-ending arthroscopic surgery to repair a SLAP tear in his right shoulder.

Jackson signed with the Houston Astros the next year. The Astros, National League Central champions, earned a spot in the playoffs, but were eliminated by the Atlanta Braves in the Divisional series. After his season with the Astros, in 2002, Jackson signed as a non-roster invitee with the Minnesota Twins, helping them to finish 94–67 and leading them to a playoff appearance, where he recorded a 27.00 ERA over three games pitched in the American League Championship Series (ALCS). The Twins lost the ALCS in five games. Jackson was granted free agency later that year.

On January 29, 2003, Jackson signed for the Arizona Diamondbacks, but did not play a major league or minor league game for the franchise. The Diamondbacks released Jackson on March 29, 2003, before the season began. Jackson later stated:

I know it's a numbers game and nothing I could control, but I was disappointed that I had to sit at home [for the 2003 season]. If teams want to base their decision about me on spring training as opposed to what I’ve accomplished over the years, then I don’t know what to say.

In his last professional season, Jackson signed as a non-roster invitee with the Chicago White Sox. For the season, Jackson recorded an ERA of 5.01, allowing 31 runs over 46.2 innings pitched. The White Sox released Jackson on September 2, 2004.

== Personal life ==
Jackson is married to Tammy Jackson and has four children: Lindsay, Ryan, Amber (Scott) and Michael. In 2017, Jackson represented the Indians at the MLB draft.

== See also ==
- Philadelphia Phillies all-time roster (I–J)
