= Glenn Wilson (baseball) =

American baseball player (born 1958)

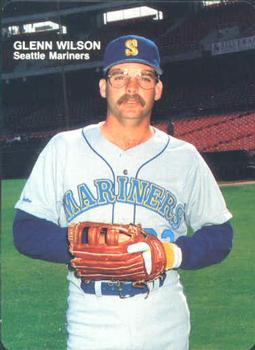
- Right fielder
- Born: December 22, 1958 (age 67); Baytown, Texas, U.S.
- Batted: Right Threw: Right

MLB debut
- April 15, 1982, for the Detroit Tigers

Last MLB appearance
- June 14, 1993, for the Pittsburgh Pirates

MLB statistics
- Batting average: .265
- Home runs: 98
- Runs batted in: 521
- Stats at Baseball Reference

Teams
- Detroit Tigers (1982–1983); Philadelphia Phillies (1984–1987); Seattle Mariners (1988); Pittsburgh Pirates (1988–1989); Houston Astros (1989–1990); Pittsburgh Pirates (1993)

Career highlights and awards
- All-Star (1985)

Glenn Dwight Wilson (born December 22, 1958) is an American former professional baseball player. He played ten seasons in Major League Baseball, between 1982 and 1993, for the Detroit Tigers, Philadelphia Phillies, Seattle Mariners, Pittsburgh Pirates, and Houston Astros. He was primarily used as a right fielder.

== Biography ==
Born in Baytown, Texas, Wilson attended Channelview High School and Sam Houston State University.

Wilson was selected in the first round (18th pick) of the 1980 amateur draft by the Tigers. He made his major league debut on April 15, 1982. After the season, Wilson was named Tigers Rookie of the Year. He played two seasons for the Tigers, hitting .292 as a rookie, then driving in 65 runs in 1983, making him a valuable player for a trade. Being only 25, he was then traded on March 24, 1984, along with John Wockenfuss to the Philadelphia Phillies for Willie Hernández and Dave Bergman.

Wilson was best known for his strong throwing arm, and he led all National League outfielders for assists in 1985, 1986, and 1987, throwing out 18, 19 and 20 base-runners from right field, respectively. In 1987, Wilson three times threw out base runners who attempted to reach first base after apparent singles into right field. His most successful season as a batter was in 1985, when he drove in 102 runs, and recorded 167 base hits with 14 home runs in 608 at bats for a .275 batting average. He was selected as a National League All-Star in 1985. On August 5, 1987 Wilson pitched in the bottom on the eighth inning in a game against the New York Mets when the Phillies ran out of relief pitchers and manager Lee Elia put him on the mound. In the only pitching appearance of his career he pitched a 1-2-3 inning, which included striking out Howard Johnson.

Wilson was dealt, along with Mike Jackson and Dave Brundage, from the Phillies to the Seattle Mariners for Phil Bradley and Tim Fortugno at the Winter Meetings on December 9, 1987. On September 15, 1988, Wilson hit two home runs off Randy Johnson, the first two homers ever surrendered by Johnson. At the start of the following season, Wilson again tagged Johnson for a homer.

Wilson owned and operated a gas station in Conroe, Texas. From 1988 to 2006, he was a manager in independent minor league baseball for the Amarillo Dillas, Coastal Bend Aviators of the Central Baseball League and the Chillicothe Paints of the Frontier League. He released his autobiography, co-written with Darrell Halk and titled Headed Home: A [sic] MLB All-Star's Search for Truth, in 2012. Wilson is a licensed ordained minister.

According to writer-director Richard Linklater, the character Glenn McReynolds (played by Tyler Hoechlin) in the 2016 film Everybody Wants Some!! is based on Wilson at Sam Houston State. Wilson filed a lawsuit against Linklater for using his name to promote the movie. Wilson did not remember Linklater ever being in a game since he was a freshman, while Wilson was a junior.
