= Bill McGuire (baseball) =

American baseball player (born 1964)

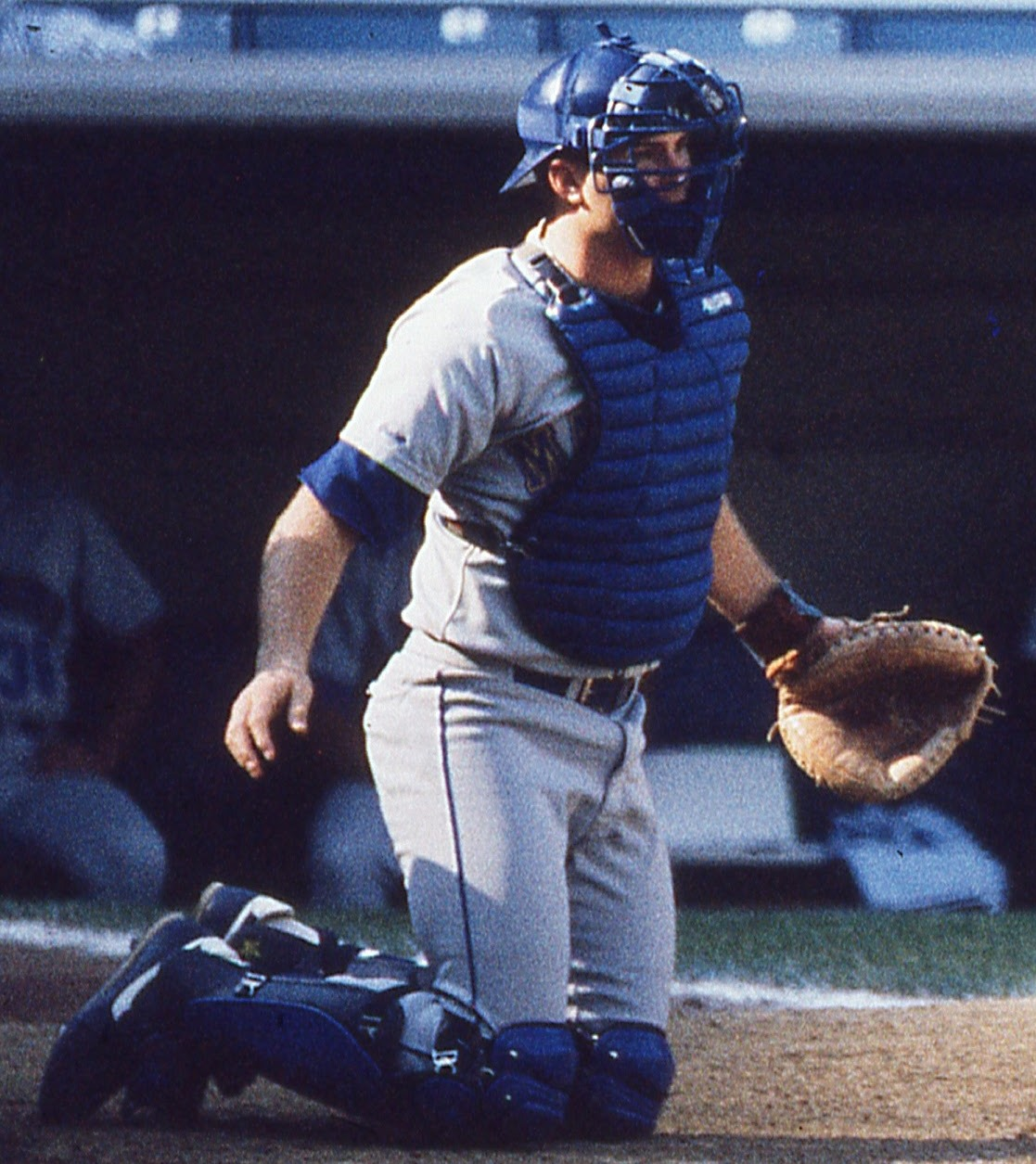
- McGuire in 1988
- Catcher
- Born: February 14, 1964 (age 62); Omaha, Nebraska, U.S.
- Batted: left Threw: Right

MLB debut
- August 2, 1988, for the Seattle Mariners

Last MLB appearance
- September 22, 1989, for the Seattle Mariners

MLB statistics
- Batting average: .182
- Home runs: 1
- Runs batted in: 6
- Stats at Baseball Reference

Teams
- Seattle Mariners (1988–1989)

William Patrick McGuire (born February 14, 1964) is an American former professional baseball catcher for the Seattle Mariners of Major League Baseball (MLB).

McGuire attended Creighton Preparatory School in Omaha where he was regarded as one of the best high school catchers in the country. He was named to the ABCA/Rawlings High School All-America Baseball Team in both 1981 and 1982. He committed to playing college baseball at Nebraska over competing offers from Arizona, Arizona State, USC, Miami and Mississippi State among others. Although selected by the Cleveland Indians in the 25th round of the 1982 Major League Baseball draft, he chose to honor his commitment and enroll at Nebraska.

McGuire thrived at Nebraska as both a catcher and a pitcher. He received Second and Third Team All-America honors from Baseball America as a sophomore and junior respectively. He was also named to the All-Big Eight Conference team as a junior.

McGuire was drafted by the Seattle Mariners out of the University of Nebraska–Lincoln in the 1st round (27th overall) of the 1985 MLB draft. He made his MLB debut in 1988 and also played in MLB in 1989. He played his final professional season in 1992 for the Single-A Peoria Chiefs in the Chicago Cubs organization.

After the end of his playing career, McGuire began working as a college baseball umpire. Through his work as an umpire, he drew the attention of Wichita State Shockers baseball recruiters to Conor Gillaspie and A. J. Ladwig among other Nebraskan baseball players.
