= Gene Walter =

American baseball player (born 1960)

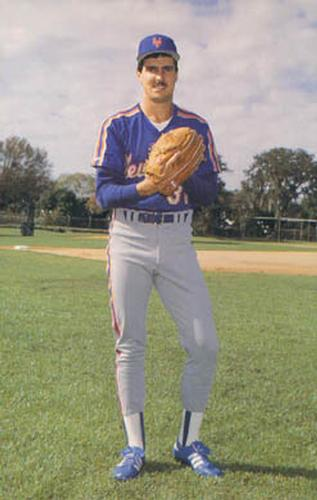
- Walter with the New York Mets c. 1987
- Relief pitcher
- Born: November 22, 1960 (age 65); Chicago, Illinois, U.S.
- Batted: Left Threw: Left

MLB debut
- August 9, 1985, for the San Diego Padres

Last MLB appearance
- September 30, 1988, for the Seattle Mariners

MLB statistics
- Win–loss record: 4–7
- Earned run average: 3.74
- Strikeouts: 140
- Stats at Baseball Reference

Teams
- San Diego Padres (1985–1986); New York Mets (1987–1988); Seattle Mariners (1988)

Gene Winston Walter (born November 22, 1960) is an American former professional baseball relief pitcher for the San Diego Padres (1985–1986), New York Mets (1987–1988), and Seattle Mariners (1988) of Major League Baseball (MLB).

On July 18, 1988, Walter set a Mariners record and tied an American League record for most balks in a game with 4.

== Playing career ==
Walter attended Kennedy High School in Chicago, Illinois. He played college baseball at Morton Junior College then Eastern Kentucky University. The Padres selected him in the 29th round of the 1982 MLB draft. He made his MLB debut in 1985, replacing an injured Goose Gossage. and earning a three-innings save. He relied primarily on his slider. Walter had three saves in his first season and his only other MLB save in 1986.

San Diego traded Walter to the Mets in an eight-player trade that sent Kevin McReynolds to the Mets and Kevin Mitchell to the Padres in December 1986. Walter was demoted to the minors in 1987 due to control issues. He pitched in 40 games for the Mets before they traded him to the Mariners for Edwin Núñez in July 1988.

Walter underwent arthroscopic surgery on his shoulder in April 1989 after suffering an injury in spring training, missing the entire season and ending his MLB career. He threw a no-hitter for the Triple-A Omaha Royals in July 1990. He continued to pitch in the minors through 1993.
