= Phil Bradley =

American baseball player (born 1959)

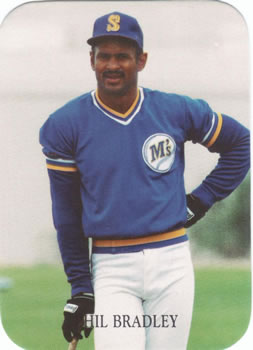
- Left fielder
- Born: March 11, 1959 (age 67); Bloomington, Indiana, U.S.
- Batted: Right Threw: Right

Professional debut
- MLB: September 2, 1983, for the Seattle Mariners
- NPB: April 6, 1991, for the Yomiuri Giants

Last appearance
- MLB: September 29, 1990, for the Chicago White Sox
- NPB: September 29, 1991, for the Yomiuri Giants

MLB statistics
- Batting average: .286
- Home runs: 78
- Runs batted in: 376
- Stats at Baseball Reference

Teams
- Seattle Mariners (1983–1987); Philadelphia Phillies (1988); Baltimore Orioles (1989–1990); Chicago White Sox (1990); Yomiuri Giants (1991)

Career highlights and awards
- All-Star (1985)

Philip Poole Bradley (born March 11, 1959) is an American former professional baseball outfielder / designated hitter who played in Major League Baseball (MLB) for the Seattle Mariners, Philadelphia Phillies, Baltimore Orioles, and Chicago White Sox from 1983 to 1990. He also played in Nippon Professional Baseball (NPB) for the Yomiuri Giants in 1991. He was an MLB All-Star in 1985.

Bradley was the starting quarterback for the Missouri Tigers football team and was named the Big Eight Conference Offensive Player of the Year. He was inducted into the Missouri Tigers Hall of Fame and was an assistant coach for the Tigers softball team. He currently works for the Major League Baseball Players Association.

== Amateur career ==
Bradley was raised in Macomb, Illinois, where he played high school baseball and football for the Macomb High Bombers. Due to his success there, the Macomb High School baseball field was later dedicated in his name. Also a talented football player, he played college football at the University of Missouri and was the starting quarterback from 1978 to 1980.

Bradley lettered in football at MU from 1977 to 1980, and in baseball from 1979 to 1981. He quarterbacked the Tigers to three bowl games. He was a three-time Big Eight Conference "Offensive Player of the Year" and set the conference total offense record at 6,459 yards, which stood for 10 years. Bradley, an option quarterback, said he was not a National Football League prospect but had an offer to play in the Canadian Football League.

In baseball, he starred as an outfielder on MU teams that won the Big Eight championship in 1980, and went to the NCAA Tournament in 1980 and 1981.

== Professional career ==
Bradley was drafted by the Seattle Mariners in the third round (53rd overall) of the 1981 Major League Baseball draft. He made his Major League debut on September 2, 1983, as a pinch hitter against the New York Yankees.

Bradley became Seattle's regular left fielder in 1984, batting .301 with 24 RBI in 124 games, but did not show any power, hitting no home runs. At that point in his career, he had only hit three career home runs, all in the minor leagues. In 1985, Bradley hit .300 with a surprising 26 home runs and 88 RBI in 159 games. He set career highs in several offensive categories, including home runs, RBI, hits (192), slugging percentage (.498) and on-base plus slugging (.862). Bradley was selected to the American League (AL) All-Star team, and finished 16th in AL MVP voting. Bradley was a productive player in Seattle, never hitting below .297 in four full seasons while also stealing 107 bases. On April 13, 1985, at home against pitcher Ron Davis of the Twins, with two outs in the ninth inning, Bradley hit a walk-off grand slam home run to win by one run, becoming the third AL player to do so (ninth player in the majors). On April 29, 1986, Bradley was Roger Clemens' 20th and final strikeout as the pitcher set a major league record for strikeouts in a game.

Bradley was traded along with Tim Fortugno from the Mariners to the Philadelphia Phillies for Glenn Wilson, Mike Jackson, and Dave Brundage at the Winter Meetings on December 9, 1987. In 154 games, Bradley hit .264 with 11 home runs and 56 RBI in his only season with the Phillies. While a Phillie, Bradley was hit by a pitch 16 times during the season, the most in franchise history since 1899. He also became the first player to come to the plate at night (under the lights) at Wrigley Field against the Cubs on August 8, although the game was rained out and did not officially count.

Bradley was traded to the Baltimore Orioles for Ken Howell and Gordon Dillard on December 9, 1988, exactly one year after his trade to Philadelphia. The transaction addressed the Orioles' need for right-handed hitting and the Phillies' for starting pitching. Back in the more familiar AL, his batting average rose to .277 in his first season in Baltimore. He was the starting left fielder and oldest everyday player with the "Why Not?" Orioles of which he said, "On paper, that was probably the worst team I ever played for and, as it turned out, it was the best team I ever played with."

After batting .270 with four home runs, 26 RBI and 10 stolen bases through the first four months of the 1990 season, Bradley was traded from the Orioles to the Chicago White Sox for Ron Kittle on July 30. His $1.15 million salary at the back end of a two-year contract was almost double the $550,000 that Kittle was earning. He had rejected the Orioles' one-year, $1.3 million contract offer which he called "a humiliation" a week prior to the trade. Baltimore general manager Roland Hemond was criticized by the Daily Press for bringing on too many ex-White Sox, including Kittle, Greg Walker, Kevin Hickey, Tim Hulett and Dave Gallagher. Bradley's final major league appearance came on September 29, 1990, as he drew two walks and scored a run in a 5–2 White Sox win over the Mariners.

== Post-playing career ==
After retiring, Bradley became the baseball coach at Westminster College in Fulton, Missouri. He also taught classes there, including upper-level classes on sports history.

In September 2009, Bradley was named as a volunteer assistant coach of the Missouri Tigers softball team, coaching the team through the 2014 season. He currently works for the Major League Baseball Players Association (MLBPA) as a special assistant in the International and Domestic Player Operations department.

Bradley was inducted into the Missouri Tigers Hall of Fame in 1990 and the Missouri Sports Hall of Fame in 2013. The Tigers baseball team retired his number 15 in 2003. He won the MLBPA's Curt Flood Award in 2023.

== Career statistics ==
Years	Games	PA	AB	R	H	2B	3B	HR	RBI	SB	BB	SO	AVG	OBP	SLG	FLD%
8	1,022	4,255	3,695	565	1,058	179	43	78	376	155	432	718	.286	.369	.421	.988

== Personal life ==
Bradley is married. His father was a professor at Western Illinois University. Bradley and his wife have two children. Their son Curt played football and baseball for the Northern Iowa Panthers, was drafted in the 2007 MLB draft by the Los Angeles Dodgers, and coaches high school football in Bradenton, Florida.

== See also ==
- List of Major League Baseball ultimate grand slams
