= Jeff Datz =

American baseball player and coach (born 1959)

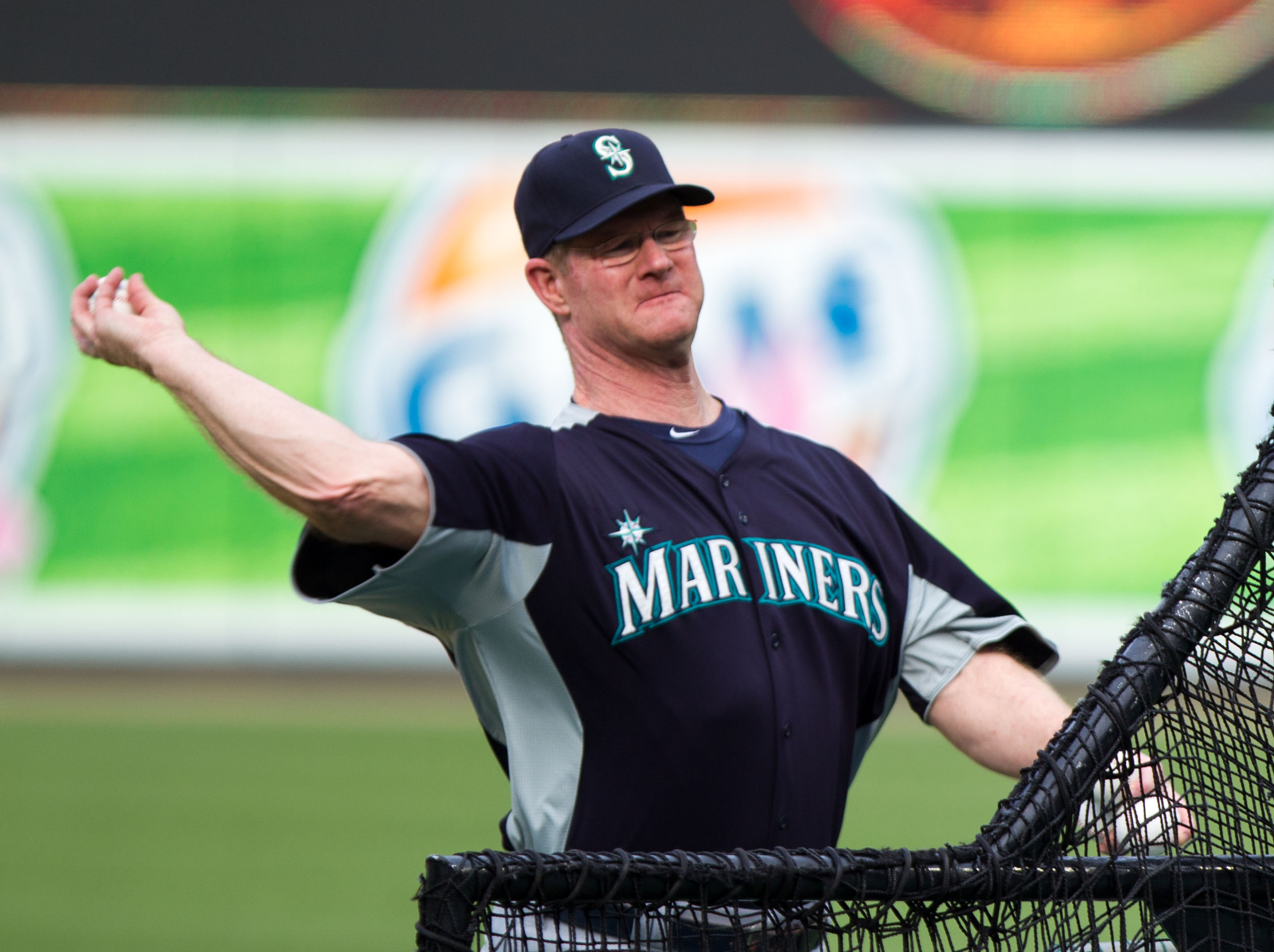
- Datz throwing batting practice for the Mariners in 2012
- Catcher
- Born: November 28, 1959 (age 66); Camden, New Jersey, U.S.
- Batted: Right Threw: Right

MLB debut
- September 5, 1989, for the Detroit Tigers

Last MLB appearance
- September 30, 1989, for the Detroit Tigers

MLB statistics
- Batting average: .200
- Hits: 2
- Walks: 1
- Stats at Baseball Reference

Teams
- As player: Detroit Tigers (1989); As coach: Cleveland Indians (2002–2009); Baltimore Orioles (2010); Seattle Mariners (2011–2013)

Jeffrey William Datz (born November 28, 1959) is an American former Major League Baseball (MLB) catcher and coach who played for the Detroit Tigers in 1989, and who is currently a scout for the New York Yankees.

== Playing career ==
A native of Camden, New Jersey, Datz grew up in the Mullica Hill section of Harrison Township, New Jersey and graduated from Clearview Regional High School. He attended Rowan University. In 1981, he played collegiate summer baseball with the Chatham A's of the Cape Cod Baseball League. He was selected by the Houston Astros in the 19th round (485th overall) of the 1982 Major League Baseball draft.

Datz signed as a free agent with the Detroit Tigers prior to the 1989 season, and appeared in seven games for the team that year.

== Coaching career ==
Datz was manager of the minor league Buffalo Bisons in 1998 and 1999. He led the Bisons to the league championship crown in 1998.

On March 19, 2002, Datz was hired as the bench coach for the Cleveland Indians under manager Charlie Manuel. In 2003, Manuel was replaced by Eric Wedge, and he moved Datz to first base coach. Datz served on Cleveland's coaching staff until the end of the 2009 season, when general manager Mark Shapiro fired the entire coaching staff. At the 2008 Home Run Derby at Yankee Stadium, Datz pitched for Cleveland Indians center fielder Grady Sizemore.

On October 29, 2009, Datz was hired as the bench coach for the Baltimore Orioles.

On November 4, 2010, Datz was hired to be third base coach for the Seattle Mariners starting with the 2011 season. The hiring reunited him with Eric Wedge, who had recently been hired as the Mariners' manager. Before a Mariners game against the Los Angeles Angels of Anaheim on April 27, 2013, Datz announced that he was diagnosed with an undisclosed form of cancer, and Tacoma Rainiers manager Daren Brown was promoted to substitute for Datz. On August 23, 2013, Datz resumed his position on the team as an extra coach.

== Scouting career ==
On November 25, 2013, it was announced that Datz will serve the Mariners as a member of the club's professional scouting staff for the 2014 season.

Datz later joined the New York Yankees, where he was listed as a professional scout for the 2016 season.
