= Tim Fortugno =

American baseball player (born 1962)

- Pitcher
- Born: April 11, 1962 (age 64); Clinton, Massachusetts, U.S.
- Batted: Left Threw: Left

MLB debut
- July 20, 1992, for the California Angels

Last MLB appearance
- July 26, 1995, for the Chicago White Sox

MLB statistics
- Win–loss record: 3–4
- Earned run average: 5.06
- Strikeouts: 84

CPBL statistics
- Win–loss record: 3–5
- Earned run average: 3.21
- Strikeouts: 96
- Stats at Baseball Reference

Teams
- California Angels (1992); Cincinnati Reds (1994); Chicago White Sox (1995); Sinon Bulls (1998)

Timothy Shawn Fortugno (born April 11, 1962) is an American former Major League Baseball pitcher and current scout, working for the New York Mets as of November 2015.

== Career ==
He graduated in 1980 from Uxbridge High School (Uxbridge, Massachusetts). Fortugno is an alumnus of Golden West College and Vanguard University of Southern California.

Fortugno signed with the Seattle Mariners as an amateur free agent in 1986. He was traded along with Phil Bradley from the Mariners to the Philadelphia Phillies for Glenn Wilson, Mike Jackson and Dave Brundage at the Winter Meetings on December 9, 1987. He made his major league debut at the age of 30 with the California Angels on July 20, 1992, and appear in his final game on July 26, 1995. His last year in professional baseball was in 1998. He played until he was 36 years old, ultimately, venturing into scouting.

Primarily a relief pitcher during his professional career (1986–1997), his first major league win came in his second start. On July 25, 1992, Fortugno hurled a three-hit shutout against the Detroit Tigers, striking out 12.

Fortugno's career totals include 76 games pitched (5 starts), 110.1 innings, a 3–4 record with one save, and an ERA of 5.06. Fortugno was the pitcher who yielded the 3,000th hit of future Hall of Fame member George Brett on September 30, 1992. Shortly after giving up the hit, he picked Brett off at first base.
