= List of South Atlantic League champions =

The South Atlantic League of Minor League Baseball is one of three High-A baseball leagues in the United States. A league champion is determined at the end of each season. Champions have been determined by postseason playoffs, winning the regular season pennant, or being declared champion by the league office. For 2019, the first- and second-half winners within each division, Northern and Southern, met in a best-of-three series to determine division champions. Then, the North and South division winners played a best-of-five series to determine a league champion. As of 2022, the winners of each division from both the first and second halves of the season meet in a best-of-three division series, with the winners of the two division series meeting in a best-of-three championship series.

== League champions ==
| Year | Champion | Finalist | Other postseason participants |
|---|---|---|---|
| 1980 | Greensboro Hornets | Charleston Royals | Gastonia Cardinals; Spartanburg Phillies |
| 1981 | Greensboro Hornets | Greenwood Pirates | — |
| 1982 | Greensboro Hornets | Florence Blue Jays | Charleston Royals |
| 1983 | Gastonia Expos | Columbia Mets | — |
| 1984 | Asheville Tourists | Charleston Royals | Greensboro Hornets; Savannah Cardinals |
| 1985 | Florence Blue Jays | Greensboro Hornets | Columbia Mets; Sumter Braves |
| 1986 | Columbia Mets | Asheville Tourists | — |
| 1987 | Myrtle Beach Blue Jays | Asheville Tourists | — |
| 1988 | Spartanburg Phillies | Charleston Rainbows | Greensboro Hornets; Myrtle Beach Blue Jays |
| 1989 | Augusta Pirates | Gastonia Rangers | Charleston Rainbows |
| 1990 | Charleston Wheelers | Savannah Cardinals | — |
| 1991 | Columbia Mets | Charleston Wheelers | Macon Braves |
| 1992 | Myrtle Beach Hurricanes | Charleston Wheelers | Columbus RedStixx; Spartanburg Phillies |
| 1993 | Savannah Cardinals | Greensboro Hornets | Fayetteville Generals |
| 1994 | Savannah Cardinals | Hagerstown Suns | Columbus RedStixx; Hickory Crawdads |
| 1995 | Augusta GreenJackets | Piedmont Phillies | Asheville Tourists; Columbus RedStixx |
| 1996 | Savannah Sand Gnats | Delmarva Shorebirds | Asheville Tourists; Columbus RedStixx |
| 1997 | Delmarva Shorebirds | Greensboro Bats | Augusta GreenJackets; Cape Fear Crocs; Charleston Alley Cats; Capital City Bombers; Hickory Crawdads; Macon Braves |
| 1998 | Capital City Bombers | Greensboro Bats | Augusta GreenJackets; Cape Fear Crocs; Delmarva Shorebirds; Hagerstown Suns; Macon Braves; Piedmont Boll Weevils |
| 1999 | Augusta GreenJackets | Cape Fear Crocs | Capital City Bombers; Columbus RedStixx; Greensboro Bats; Hagerstown Suns; Hickory Crawdads; Macon Braves |
| 2000 | Delmarva Shorebirds | Columbus RedStixx | Augusta GreenJackets; Piedmont Boll Weevils |
| 2001^{[a]} | Asheville Tourists; Lexington Legends | — | Augusta GreenJackets; Hagerstown Suns |
| 2002 | Hickory Crawdads | Columbus RedStixx | Capital City Bombers; Delmarva Shorebirds |
| 2003 | Rome Braves | Lake County Captains | Hickory Crawdads; Lexington Legends |
| 2004 | Hickory Crawdads | Capital City Bombers | Charleston Alley Cats |
| 2005 | Kannapolis Intimidators | Hagerstown Suns | Charleston RiverDogs; Delmarva Shorebirds |
| 2006 | Lakewood BlueClaws | Augusta GreenJackets | Lexington Legends; Rome Braves |
| 2007 | Columbus Catfish | West Virginia Power | Augusta GreenJackets; Hickory Crawdads |
| 2008 | Augusta GreenJackets | West Virginia Power | Asheville Tourists; Lake County Captains |
| 2009 | Lakewood BlueClaws | Greenville Drive | Asheville Tourists; Kannapolis Intimidators |
| 2010 | Lakewood BlueClaws | Greenville Drive | Hickory Crawdads; Savannah Sand Gnats |
| 2011 | Greensboro Grasshoppers | Savannah Sand Gnats | Augusta GreenJackets; Hickory Crawdads |
| 2012 | Asheville Tourists | Greensboro Grasshoppers | Hagerstown Suns; Rome Braves |
| 2013 | Savannah Sand Gnats | Hagerstown Suns | Augusta GreenJackets; West Virginia Power |
| 2014 | Asheville Tourists | Hagerstown Suns | Greensboro Grasshoppers; Savannah Sand Gnats |
| 2015 | Hickory Crawdads | Asheville Tourists | Savannah Sand Gnats; West Virginia Power |
| 2016 | Rome Braves | Lakewood BlueClaws | Charleston RiverDogs; Hagerstown Suns |
| 2017 | Greenville Drive | Kannapolis Intimidators | Charleston RiverDogs; Greensboro Grasshoppers |
| 2018 | Lexington Legends | Lakewood BlueClaws | Kannapolis Intimidators; Rome Braves |
| 2019 | Lexington Legends | Hickory Crawdads | Augusta Greenjackets; Delmarva Shorebirds |
| 2020 | None (season cancelled due to COVID-19 pandemic) | | |
| 2021 | Bowling Green Hot Rods | Greensboro Grasshoppers | — |
| 2022 | Bowling Green Hot Rods | Aberdeen IronBirds | Brooklyn Cyclones; Rome Braves |
| 2023 | Greenville Drive | Hudson Valley Renegades | Hickory Crawdads; Jersey Shore BlueClaws |
| 2024 | Bowling Green Hot Rods | Hudson Valley Renegades | Greensboro Grasshoppers; Rome Emperors |
| 2025 | Brooklyn Cyclones | Hub City Spartanburgers | Bowling Green Hot Rods; Greensboro Grasshoppers |
| 2026 | Winston-Salem Dash | Greensboro Grasshoppers | Bowling Green Hot Rods; Frederick Keys |

== Championship wins by team ==
Active South Atlantic League teams appear in bold.

| Wins | Team | Championship years |
|---|---|---|
| 5 | **Greenville Drive** (Columbia Mets/Capital City Bombers) | 1986, 1991, 1998, 2017, 2023 |
| 4 | **Asheville Tourists** | 1984, 2001, 2012, 2014 |
| 4 | Augusta Pirates/GreenJackets | 1989, 1995, 1999, 2008 |
| 4 | **Greensboro Hornets/Grasshoppers** | 1980, 1981, 1982, 2011 |
| 4 | Savannah Cardinals/Sand Gnats | 1993, 1994, 1996, 2013 |
| 3 | **Bowling Green Hot Rods** | 2021, 2022, 2024 |
| 3 | Hickory Crawdads | 2002, 2004, 2015 |
| 3 | **Jersey Shore BlueClaws** (Lakewood BlueClaws) | 2006, 2009, 2010 |
| 3 | Lexington Legends | 2001, 2018, 2019 |
| 2 | Delmarva Shorebirds | 1997, 2000 |
| 2 | Myrtle Beach Blue Jays/Hurricanes | 1987, 1992 |
| 2 | **Rome Braves** | 2003, 2016 |
| 1 | **Brooklyn Cyclones** | 2025 |
| 1 | Charleston Wheelers | 1990 |
| 1 | Columbus Catfish | 2007 |
| 1 | Florence Blue Jays | 1985 |
| 1 | Gastonia Expos | 1983 |
| 1 | Kannapolis Intimidators | 2005 |
| 1 | Spartanburg Phillies | 1988 |
| 1 | **Winston-Salem Dash** | 2026 |

== Notes ==
- **^{a}** Asheville and Lexington were declared co-champions after the playoffs were cancelled in the wake the September 11 terrorist attacks.
