= AdventHealth Stadium =

Baseball stadium in Rome, Georgia, US

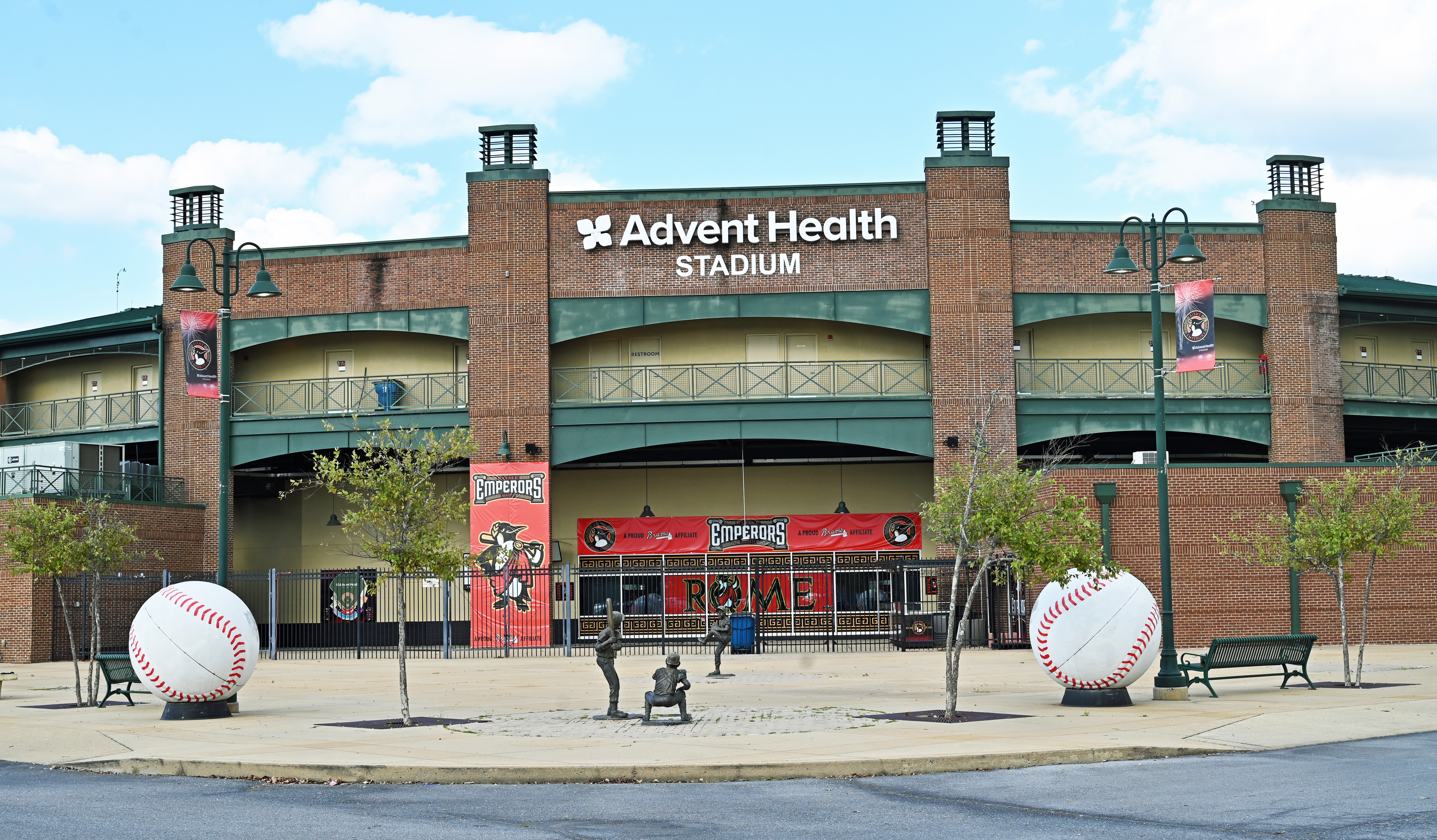
- AdventHealth Stadium in 2025
- Interactive map of AdventHealth Stadium
- Former names: State Mutual Stadium (2003-2022)
- Location: 755 Braves Boulevard; Rome, GA 30161
- Coordinates: 34°17′9″N 85°10′2″W
- Owner: Floyd County
- Operator: Rome Emperors
- Capacity: 5,105
- Surface: Synthetic Turf
- Field size: Left Field: 335 feet Center Field: 401 feet Right Field: 330 feet

Construction
- Groundbreaking: April 16, 2002
- Opened: April 6, 2003
- Cost: $19 million ($33.3 million in 2025 dollars)
- Architects: Brisbin Brook Beynon, Ltd.
- Services engineers: Mulvey & Banani International Inc.
- General contractors: H&M Construction

Tenant
- Rome Emperors (SAL) 2003–present

AdventHealth Stadium is a baseball park located in Rome, Georgia. Opened in 2003, it is the home of the High-A Rome Emperors of the South Atlantic League and has a seating capacity of 5,105. The ballpark was built following the relocation of the Class A Macon Braves from Macon to Rome.

== History ==
After the City of Macon and the Atlanta Braves organization failed to reach an agreement on a new ballpark to replace the aging Luther Williams Field, home of the Class A Macon Braves, the Braves decided to relocate the team to Rome, Georgia. Rome voters subsequently approved a SPLOST to finance the construction of a new stadium, helping secure the franchise's relocation. Funded entirely through SPLOST revenues, the ballpark was completed in time for the 2003 season, with construction costing $19 million.

On February 28, 2003, Rome-based State Mutual Insurance Company acquired the stadium's naming rights. The 18-year agreement was valued at $250,000. In April 2022, the naming rights were acquired by the nonprofit health care system AdventHealth.

== Features ==
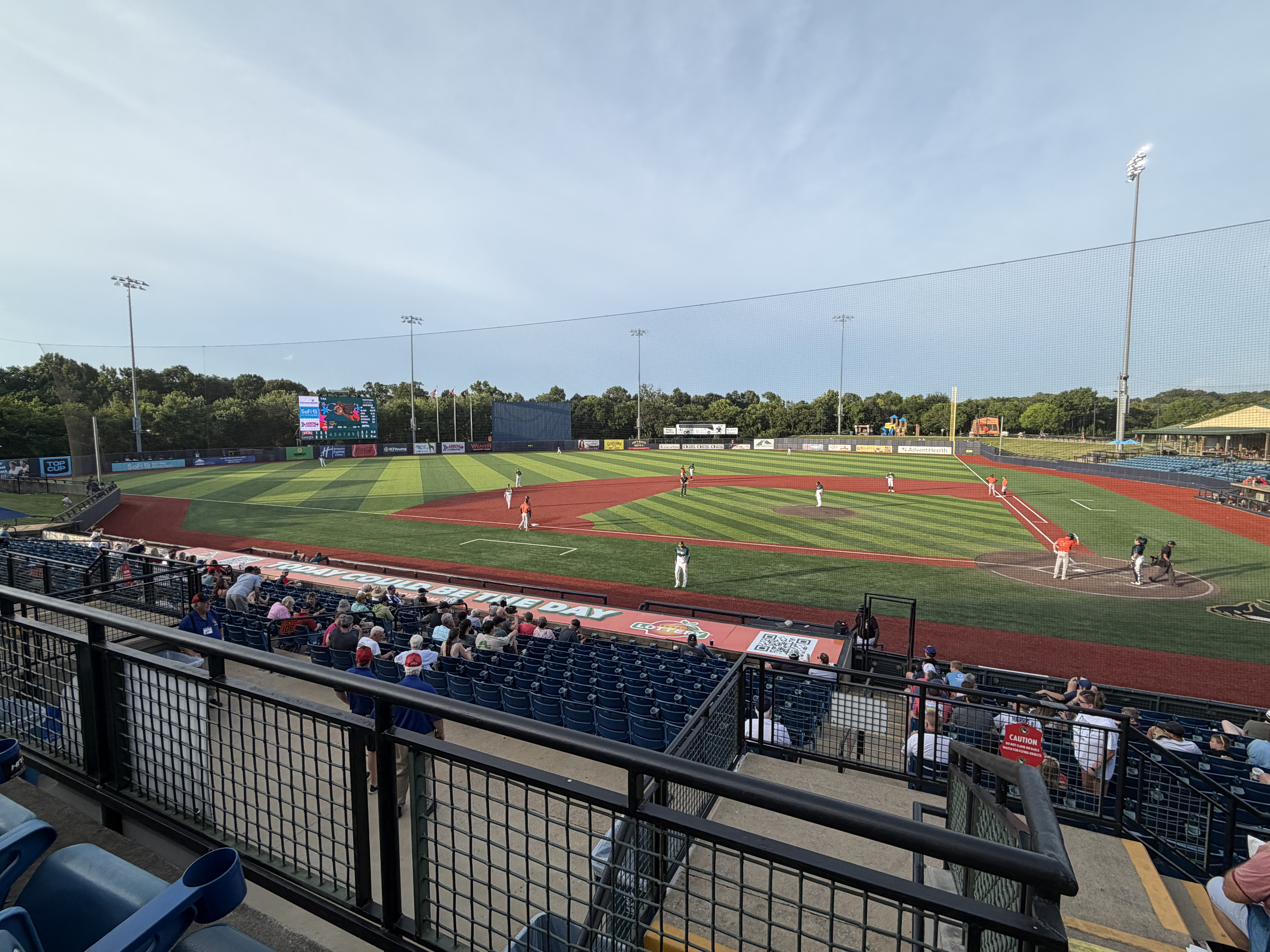
AdventHealth Stadium interior

The stadium contains 14 luxury suites, a full-service restaurant, and a group pavilion. The field dimensions mirror those of the Atlanta Braves' former home, Turner Field, located approximately 70 miles (110 km) away. The relatively large outfield contributes to the ballpark's reputation as a pitcher-friendly venue.
