= Shoeless Joe Jackson Museum =

Museum in South Carolina, USA

The Shoeless Joe Jackson Museum and Baseball Library

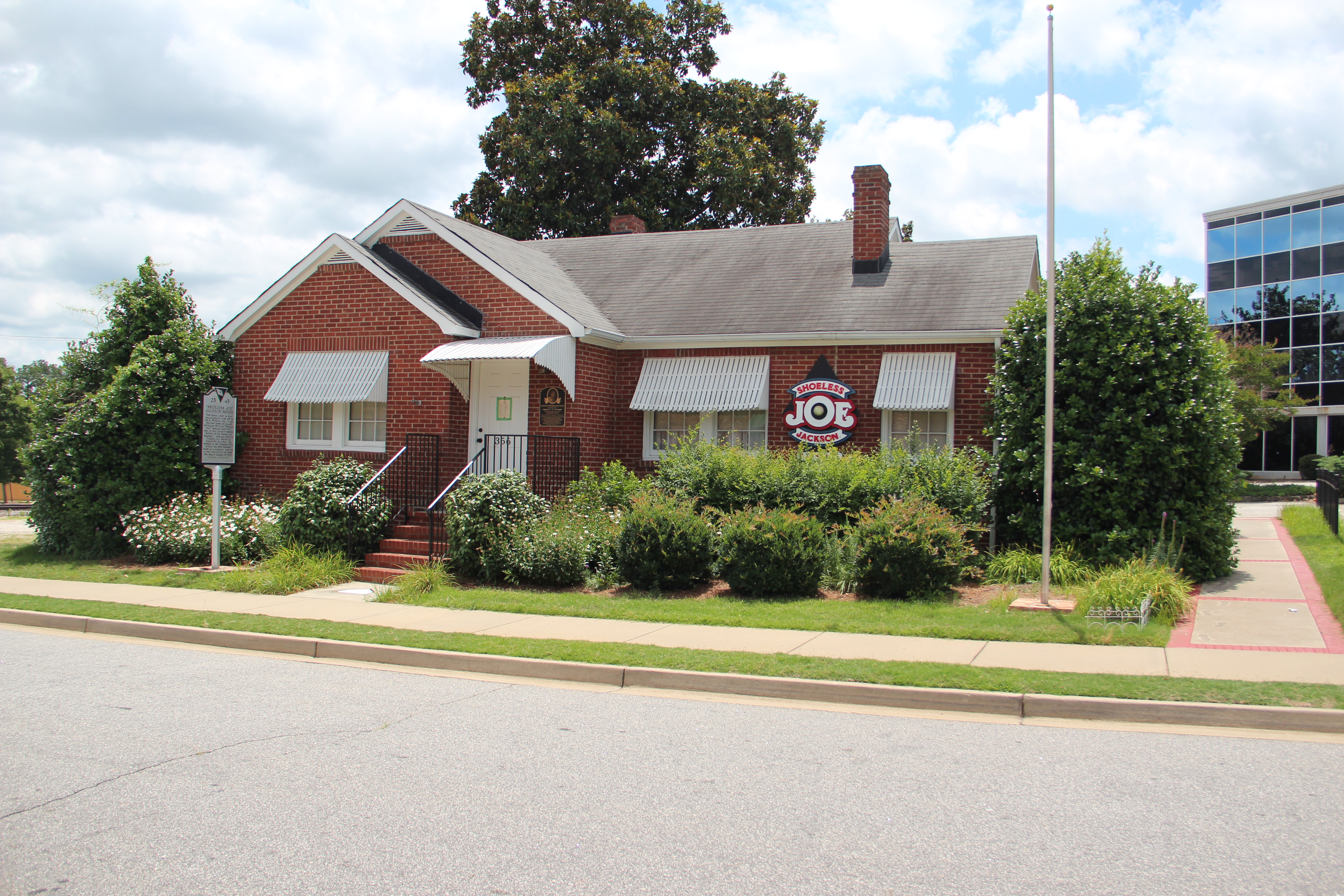
- Established: June 21, 2008
- Location: 356 Field Street, Greenville, South Carolina
- Coordinates: 34.8415°N 82.4073°W
- Website: www.shoelessjoejackson.org

The "Shoeless" Joe Jackson Museum and Library was first opened to the public on June 21, 2008. Located across from Fluor Field in Greenville, South Carolina, the five-room brick house where Shoeless Joe Jackson lived and died contains a few of his personal belongings and over 2,000 baseball-related books.

In 2015, the Shoeless Joe Jackson Museum formally petitioned Commissioner of Baseball Rob Manfred for Jackson's reinstatement to baseball, because Jackson had "more than served his sentence" in the 95 years since his banishment by Kenesaw Landis. Manfred denied the request after an official review. "The results of this work demonstrate to me that it is not possible now, over 95 years since those events took place and were considered by Commissioner Landis, to be certain enough of the truth to overrule Commissioner Landis' determinations," he wrote.

The museum allows members of the public to visit on Saturdays and conducts private tours during the week. While in Greenville, many visitors to the museum also visit "Shoeless" Joe Jackson's grave located in Woodlawn Memorial Park near the Bob Jones University campus. When visiting the grave, members of the public leave baseball-related equipment such as baseballs, gloves, and cleats.

In March 2022, the Museum opened a community book box at the site of the former Bolton Street Park in Savannah, Georgia by Fairmount Baptist Church. Shoeless Joe Jackson had played for the 1909 Savannah Indians and won the league batting title playing his games at Bolton Street Park.
