= Hickory Crawdads =

- Founded in 1993; Hickory, North Carolina
Team logo
Cap insignia

Minor league affiliations
- Class: Single-A (2025–present)
- Previous classes: High-A (2021–2024); Class A (1993–2020)
- League: Carolina League (2025–present)
- Division: South Division
- Previous leagues: South Atlantic League (1993–2024)

Major league affiliations
- Team: Texas Rangers (2009–present)
- Previous teams: Pittsburgh Pirates (1999–2008); Chicago White Sox (1993–1998)

Minor league titles
- League titles (3): 2002; 2004; 2015
- Division titles (4): 2002; 2004; 2015; 2019
- First-half titles (4): 2002; 2003; 2011; 2015
- Second-half titles (6): 1994; 2004; 2007; 2019; 2023; 2026

Team data
- Name: Hickory Crawdads (1993–present)
- Colors: Red, black, Crawdad blue, white
- Ballpark: L. P. Frans Stadium (1993–present)
- Owner/ Operator: Diamond Baseball Holdings
- General manager: Douglas Locascio
- Manager: Nick Janssen
- Website: milb.com/hickory

The Hickory Crawdads are a Minor League Baseball (MiLB) team of the Carolina League and the Single-A affiliate of the Texas Rangers. They are located in Hickory, North Carolina, and play their home games at L. P. Frans Stadium, which opened in 1993 and has roughly 4,000 fixed seats.

Established in 1993 as members of the South Atlantic League (SAL), the Crawdads were affiliated with the Chicago White Sox through 1998. They became a farm club of the Pittsburgh Pirates in 1999 and won the South Atlantic League championship in 2002 and 2004. Hickory has been affiliated with the Texas Rangers since 2009. The Crawdads won a third SAL championship in 2015. They moved to the High-A East in 2021, but this was renamed the South Atlantic League in 2022. They joined the Carolina League in 2025.

== History ==
Several Minor League Baseball (MiLB) teams known as the Hickory Rebels played in Hickory, North Carolina, intermittently from 1936 to 1960. Local businessman Don Beaver purchased the Gastonia Rangers and relocated them from Gastonia, North Carolina, to Hickory for the 1993 season. Prior to the move, the Gastonia team had served as a minor-league affiliate of both the Rangers and the Montreal Expos.

Fans were invited to submit suggestions for the team's name. Among the finalists were "Woodchucks", "River Rats", "Valley Cats", and "Hound Dogs". The chosen name, "Crawdads", was selected because of the animals' strength and presence in local waterways.

The Crawdads played in the South Atlantic League (SAL) as the Class A affiliate of the Chicago White Sox in their inaugural 1993 season. The six-year affiliation regularly had Hickory at or near the bottom of the standings, though they did qualify for the playoffs twice. On both occasions, however, they were eliminated without winning any games. The affiliation ended after the 1998 season with team accumulating a 374–464 record over that period.

Hickory entered into a new affiliation with the Pittsburgh Pirates in 1999. The Crawdads reached the postseason in five of ten seasons with Pittsburgh. They won two South Atlantic League championships, the first in 2002 and the second in 2004. The affiliation ended after the 2008 season with Hickory going 705–677 over a span of 10 years.

The Crawdads became an affiliate of the Texas Rangers in 2009. Since then, they reached the SAL finals on two occasions and won the championship in 2015. Following the 2017 season, the Rangers purchased the team from Beaver.

In conjunction with Major League Baseball's restructuring of MiLB in 2021, the Crawdads were organized into the High-A East. In 2022, the High-A East became known as the South Atlantic League, the name historically used by the regional circuit prior to the 2021 reorganization.

In July 2024, MiLB announced that the Crawdads, while remaining an affiliate of the Texas Rangers, were to be demoted to class Single-A and join the Carolina League in 2025.

== Season-by-season results ==
| Season | Regular season | | | | | Postseason | | | MLB affiliate | Ref. |
| Season | Record | Win % | League | Division | GB | Record | Win % | Result | MLB affiliate | Ref. |
|---|---|---|---|---|---|---|---|---|---|---|
| 1993 | 52–88 | .371 | 13th | 6th | 32 1/2 | — | — | Result | — | Chicago White Sox |
| 1994 | 86–54 | .614 | 2nd | 1st | — | 0–2 | .000 | Won Second Half Northern Division title Lost Northern Division title vs. Hagerstown Suns, 2–0 | Chicago White Sox | |
| 1995 | 49–89 | .355 | 14th | 7th | 35 1/2 | — | — | — | Chicago White Sox | |
| 1996 | 55–85 | .393 | 14th | 6th | 31 | — | — | — | Chicago White Sox | |
| 1997 | 76–64 | .543 | 4th | 2nd | 1 | 0–2 | .000 | Lost quarterfinals vs. Delmarva Shorebirds, 2–0 | Chicago White Sox | |
| 1998 | 56–84 | .400 | 13th | 6th | 33 1/2 | — | — | — | Chicago White Sox | |
| 1999 | 70–70 | .500 | 6th | 3rd | 12 1/2 | 3–2 | .600 | Won quarterfinals vs. Macon Braves, 2–0; Lost semifinals vs. Augusta GreenJackets, 2–1 | Pittsburgh Pirates | |
| 2000 | 75–66 | .532 | 4th (tie) | 3rd | 17 | — | — | — | Pittsburgh Pirates | |
| 2001 | 67–73 | .479 | 10th | 5th | 25 | — | — | — | Pittsburgh Pirates | |
| 2002 | 83–56 | .597 | 1st | 1st | — | 5–2 | .714 | Won First Half Northern Division title Won Northern Division title vs. Delmarva Shorebirds, 2–0; Won SAL championship vs. Columbus RedStixx, 3–2 | Pittsburgh Pirates | |
| 2003 | 82–54 | .603 | 2nd | 1st | — | 1–2 | .333 | Won First Half Southern Division title Lost Southern Division title vs. Rome Braves, 2–1 | Pittsburgh Pirates | |
| 2004 | 85–55 | .607 | 2nd | 1st | — | 5–0 | 1.000 | Won Second Half Northern Division title Won Northern Division title vs. Charleston Alley Cats, 2–0; Won SAL championship vs. Capital City Bombers, 3–0 | Pittsburgh Pirates | |
| 2005 | 54–80 | .403 | 15th (tie) | 7th (tie) | 24 1/2 | — | — | — | Pittsburgh Pirates | |
| 2006 | 67–70 | .489 | 10th | 5th | 16 | — | — | — | Pittsburgh Pirates | |
| 2007 | 70–66 | .515 | 6th | 2nd | 12 | 1–2 | .333 | Won Second Half Northern Division title Lost Northern Division title vs. West Virginia Power, 2–1 | Pittsburgh Pirates | |
| 2008 | 52–87 | .374 | 15th | 7th | 27 1/2 | — | — | — | Pittsburgh Pirates | |
| 2009 | 63–76 | .453 | 15th | 7th | 19 | — | — | — | Texas Rangers | |
| 2010 | 75–64 | .540 | 4th (tie) | 2nd | 9 | 0–2 | .000 | Lost Northern Division title vs. Lakewood BlueClaws, 2–0 | Texas Rangers | |
| 2011 | 79–58 | .577 | 1st | 1st | — | 0–2 | .000 | Won First Half Northern Division title Lost Northern Division title vs. Greensboro Grasshoppers, 2–0 | Texas Rangers | |
| 2012 | 74–65 | .532 | 5th | 3rd | 9 | — | — | — | Texas Rangers | |
| 2013 | 76–63 | .547 | 5th | 3rd | 5 1/2 | — | — | — | Texas Rangers | |
| 2014 | 80–59 | .576 | 5th | 3rd | 6 1/2 | — | — | — | Texas Rangers | |
| 2015 | 81–57 | .587 | 3rd | 2nd | 5 1/2 | 5–1 | .833 | Won First Half Northern Division title Won Northern Division title vs. West Virginia Power, 2–1; Won SAL championship vs. Asheville Tourists, 3–0 | Texas Rangers | |
| 2016 | 74–66 | .529 | 5th | 3rd | 9 | — | — | — | Texas Rangers | |
| 2017 | 64–76 | .457 | 11th | 6th | 13 | — | — | — | Texas Rangers | |
| 2018 | 70–68 | .507 | 6th (tie) | 4th (tie) | 17 | — | — | — | Texas Rangers | |
| 2019 | 83–52 | .615 | 2nd | 2nd | 5 1/2 | 3–3 | .500 | Won Second Half Northern Division title Won Northern Division title vs. Delmarva Shorebirds, 2–0; Lost SAL championship vs. Lexington Legends, 3–1 | Texas Rangers | |
| 2020 | Season cancelled (COVID-19 pandemic) | | | | | | | | Texas Rangers | |
| 2021 | 46–68 | .404 | 11th | 6th | 34 | — | — | — | Texas Rangers | |
| 2022 | 66–65 | .504 | 6th | 3rd | 12 1/2 | — | — | — | Texas Rangers | |
| 2023 | 70–55 | .560 | 2nd | 1st | — | 0–2 | .000 | Won Second Half Southern Division title Lost Southern Division title vs. Greenville Drive 0-2 | Texas Rangers | |
| 2024 | 62–70 | .470 | 9th | 4th | 14 1/2 | — | — | — | Texas Rangers | |
| 2025 | 68–62 | .523 | 4th | 3rd | 1 | — | — | — | Texas Rangers | |
| 2026 | 82–47 | .636 | 1st | 1st | — | 1–2 | .333 | Won Second Half Southern Division title Lost Southern Division title vs. Charleston RiverDogs 1-2 | Texas Rangers | |
| Totals | 2,210–2,165 | .505 | — | — | — | 23–22 | .511 | 3 league titles, 4 division titles, 10 half division titles | — | – |

Franchise totals by affiliation
| Affiliation | Regular season | | Postseason | | | Composite | |
| Affiliation | Record | Win % | Apps. | Record | Win % | Record | Win % |
|---|---|---|---|---|---|---|---|
| Chicago White Sox (1993–1999) | 374–464 | .446 | 2 | 0–4 | .000 | 374–468 | .444 |
| Pittsburgh Pirates (1999–2008) | 705–677 | .510 | 5 | 15–8 | .652 | 720–685 | .512 |
| Texas Rangers (2009–present) | 1,131–1024 | .525 | 5 | 8—10 | .444 | 1,009–902 | .528 |
| All-time | 2,210–2,165 | .505 | 11 | 23–22 | .535 | 2,103–2,055 | .506 |

== Mascot ==
Conrad the Crawdad has been the official mascot of the Crawdads since 1993. Conrad, along with his wife Candy, entertain fans during games. The two got engaged on Mother's Day weekend in 2018 and were married in an on-field ceremony on June 24, 2018.

== Roster ==
Hickory Crawdads roster
| Players | Coaches/Other |
|---|---|
| Pitchers: 22 Keiber Armas ~; 32 Jake Barbee; 48 Alejandro Chiquillo; 36 Cole Fehrman; 25 Brandon Jaenke; 43 Jacob Johnson; -- Daniel Keaney ~; 33 Jesus Lafalaise; 17 Louis Marinaro; -- Mason McConnaughey; 46 J. D. McReynolds; 37 Aneudis Mejia; 41 Moises Morales; 24 Connor O'Hara; 11 Josh Owens (two way); 19 William Privette; 40 Geury Rodriguez; 12 Evan Siary; 45 Michael Trausch; 15 Will Whelan; Catchers: 38 Sebastian Baquera; 44 Noah Franklin; 8 Josh Springer; Infielders: 5 Kolby Branch; 3 Yolfran Castillo; 35 Brandon Crabtree; 16 Daniel Flames; 28 Seong-Jun Kim (two way); 14 Curley Martha; Outfielders: 18 Marco Argudin; 6 Kaden Carpenter; 27 Pablo Guerrero; 21 Jay McQueen; 20 Paulino Santana; 9 Deward Tovar | Manager: 2 Nick Janssen; Coaches: 4 Elevys Gonzalez (development); 47 Herbert Iser (development); 1 Carlisle Koestler (pitching); 30 Daniel Padilla (hitting); 60-day injured list: -- Aidan Deakins; -- Jesus Lopez; -- Alberto Mota; 7-day injured list; * On Texas Rangers 40-man roster; ~ Development list; # Rehab assignment; ∞ Reserve list; ‡ Restricted list; § Suspended list; † Temporarily inactive list; Roster updated September 9, 2026; Transactions; → More rosters: MiLB • Carolina League; → Texas Rangers minor league players |

== Awards ==
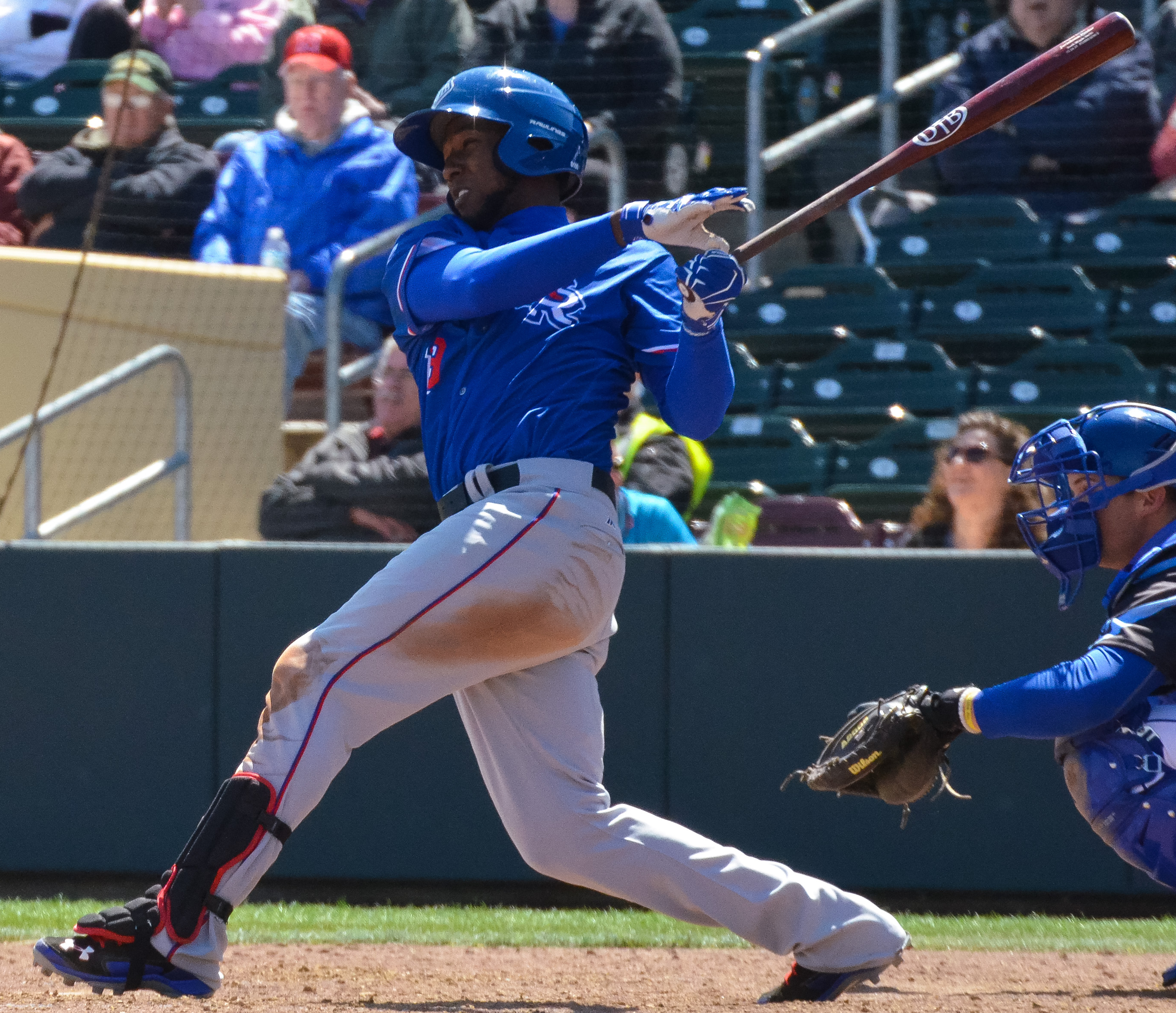
Jurickson Profar won the SAL Most Valuable Player Award in 2011.

Four players and two managers have won South Atlantic League awards in recognition for their performance with the Crawdads.

| Award | Recipient | Season | Ref. |
|---|---|---|---|
| Most Valuable Player | J. R. House | 2000 | |
| Most Valuable Player | Walter Young | 2002 | |
| Most Valuable Player | Jorge Cortes | 2003 | |
| Most Valuable Player | Jurickson Profar | 2011 | |
| Most Outstanding Prospect | Walter Young | 2002 | |
| Manager of the Year | Fred Kendall | 1994 | |
| Manager of the Year | Tony Beasley | 2002 | |

== Notable alumni ==
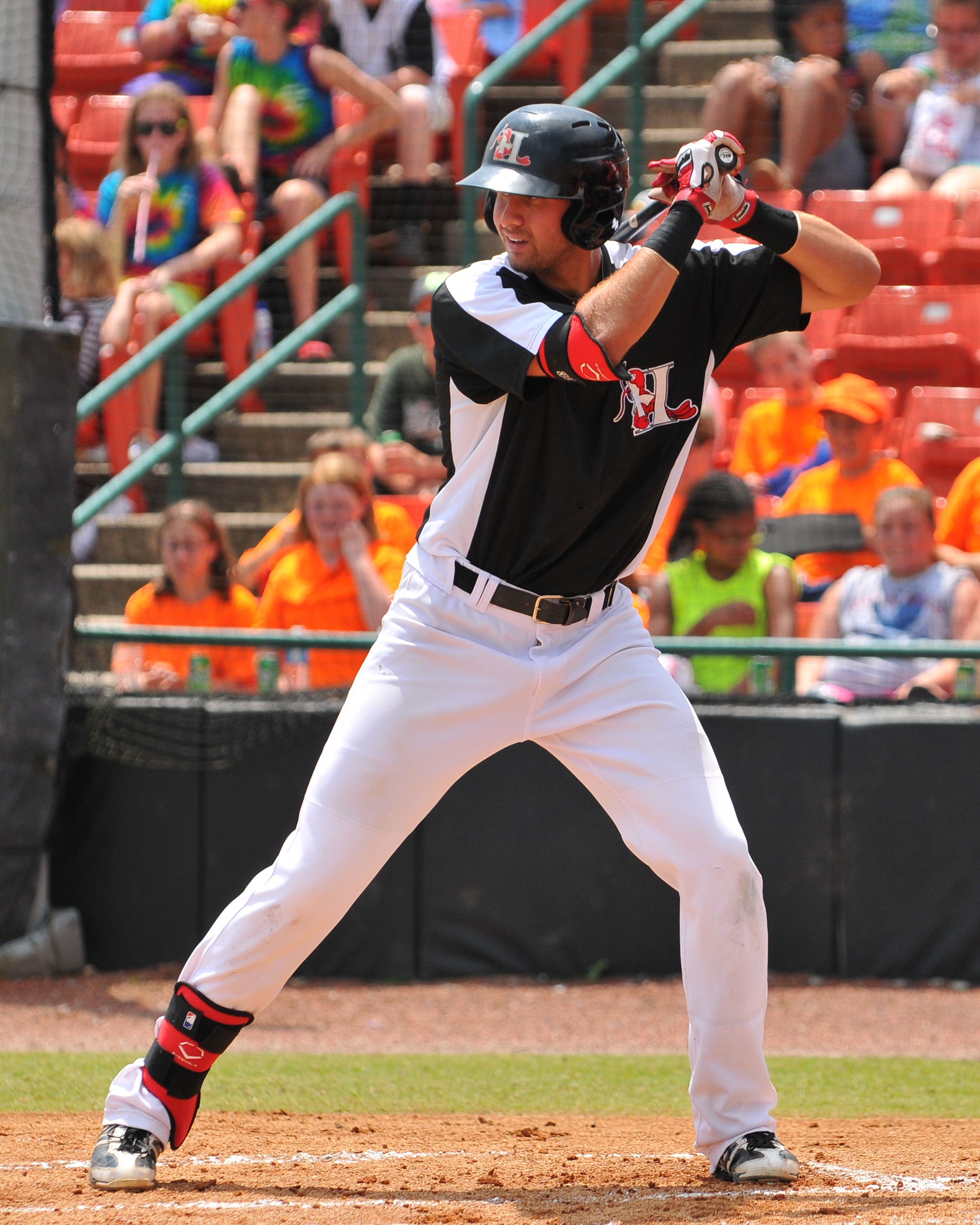
Joey Gallo batting for the Crawdads in 2013

- Jim Abbott
- Jorge Alfaro
- José Bautista
- Joe Beimel
- Matt Capps
- Joe Crede
- Rajai Davis
- Zach Duke
- Jerad Eickhoff
- Joey Gallo
- John Grabow
- Odubel Herrera
- Luke Jackson
- Carlos Lee
- Nomar Mazara
- Andrew McCutchen
- Nate McLouth
- Nyjer Morgan
- Rougned Odor
- Magglio Ordóñez
- Steve Pearce
- Martín Pérez
- Jurickson Profar
- Aaron Rowand
- Neil Walker
- Chris Young
