= Fluor Field at the West End =

Stadium in Greenville, South Carolina

- Little Fenway

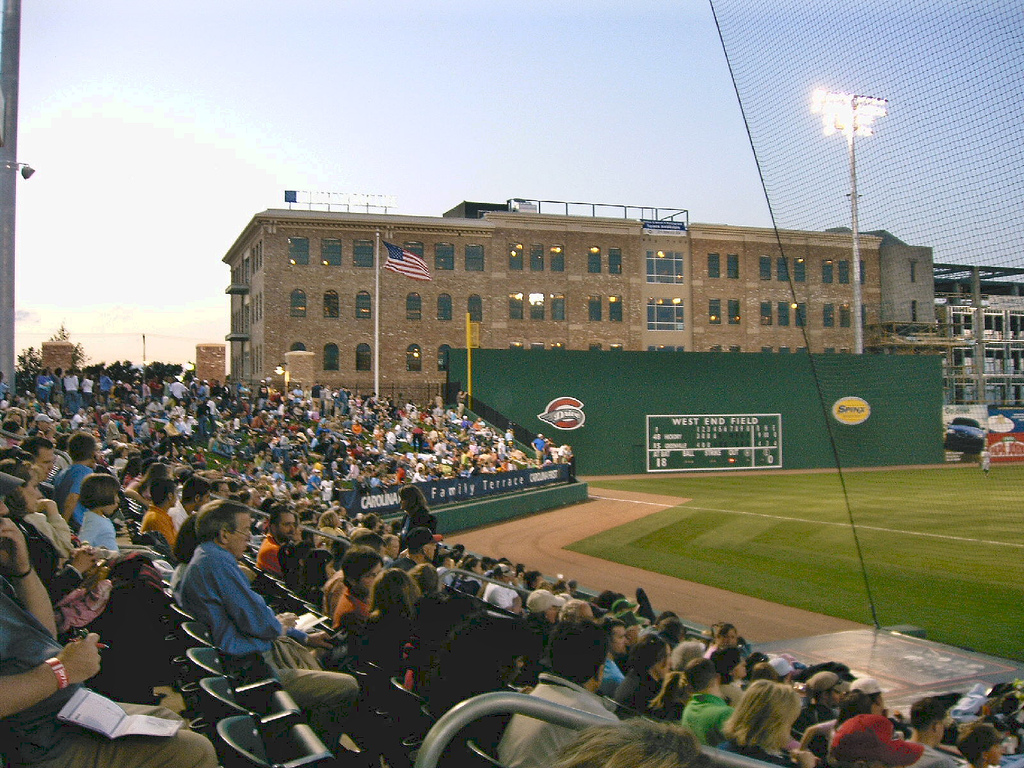

- Location within South Carolina Location within the United States
- Former names: West End Field (2006–2008)
- Location: 945 South Main Street; Greenville, SC 29601
- Coordinates: 34.8422°N 82.4082°W
- Owner: Greenville Drive, LLC
- Operator: Greenville Drive, LLC
- Capacity: 6,700 seats
- Field size: Left Field: 310 feet Left-Center Field: 379 feet Center Field: 390 feet Deep Center Field: 420 feet Deep Right Field: 380 feet Right Field: 302 feet Left-Field Wall: 33 feet

Construction
- Groundbreaking: May 28, 2005
- Opened: April 6, 2006
- Cost: $15 million ($24 million in 2025 dollars)
- Architect: DLR Group
- Structural engineer: Haris Engineering
- General contractor: EMJ Corp.

Tenants
- Greenville Drive (SAL) (2006–present); Southern Conference baseball tournament (2009, 2012, 2013, 2016–present)

Fluor Field at the West End is a 6,700-seat baseball-only stadium in Greenville, South Carolina, that opened on April 6, 2006. Designed by architectural firm DLR Group, it was built as a new home of the Greenville Drive baseball team, the South Atlantic League affiliate of the Boston Red Sox.

== Features ==
Fluor Field nearly replicates the dimensions of Fenway Park, home of the Red Sox. The ballpark has its own "Green Monster" replica (appropriately named the "Greenville Monster"), a 30-foot high wall in left field as opposed to the 37-foot one found at Fenway, which contains a manual scoreboard. Every other dimension is to the same specifications as Fenway Park, including "Pesky’s Pole" in right field and the "Triangle" in dead center. Other than the tribute to Fenway, Fluor Field also pays tribute to the Greenville area as the ballpark's nostalgic look utilizes reclaimed bricks from local mills. As is the tradition in Fenway Park, Neil Diamond's "Sweet Caroline" is sung in the middle of the seventh inning.

Fluor Field is bounded by commercial buildings and South Main Street (northwest, left field); South Markley Street (southwest, third base); Field Street (southeast, first base); and railroad tracks (east, right field). The ballpark is across the street from the Shoeless Joe Jackson Museum, which is at 356 Field Street.

In 2007, the Greenville Drive privately funded the enhancement of Fluor Field at a cost of approximately $1.5 million. One of these enhancements include a display regarding Greenville's baseball heritage with information about players who were either born or played in the upstate region.

The ballpark was originally called West End Field. On February 26, 2008, it was officially renamed to Fluor Field at the West End. The field was named for Fluor Corporation, a major local employer.

== Events ==
The field hosted the 2009, 2012 and 2013 Southern Conference baseball tournaments, and every edition since 2016 except for 2020 which was cancelled due to the coronavirus pandemic.

Since 2010, the field has often hosted a neutral site game of the Reedy River Rivalry between the Clemson Tigers and South Carolina Gamecocks. Fluor Field hosts the second of three games spread out over a weekend on a Saturday, as the Friday and Sunday contests rotate yearly between the respective home fields for the two schools. The Gamecocks, as of 2025, hold a 6–5 advantage over the Tigers in games played at Fluor Field. The field has also hosted several regular season collegiate baseball games for South Carolina-based schools since its opening.

== Milestones and notable moments ==
- First pitch: Phil Seibel, on April 6 at 7:35 pm
- First hit: Jesús Soto, on April 6, 2006, in the 4th inning
- First Drive hit: Jeff Natale, April 6, 2006, in the 4th inning
- First home run: Jesús Soto, April 6, 2006, in the 4th inning
- First Drive home run: Jeff Natale, April 6, 2006, in the 4th inning
- On December 9, 2023, at around 3:00 a.m. EDT, 3 juveniles broke into the stadium and stole items from the press box. They were identified by their parents and turned themselves in.

== Attendance records ==
- Highest season attendance: Over 350,000 (2012)
- Highest single game attendance: 7,839 (April 24, 2022, (Greenville Drive vs. Winston-Salem Dash)

== Gallery ==
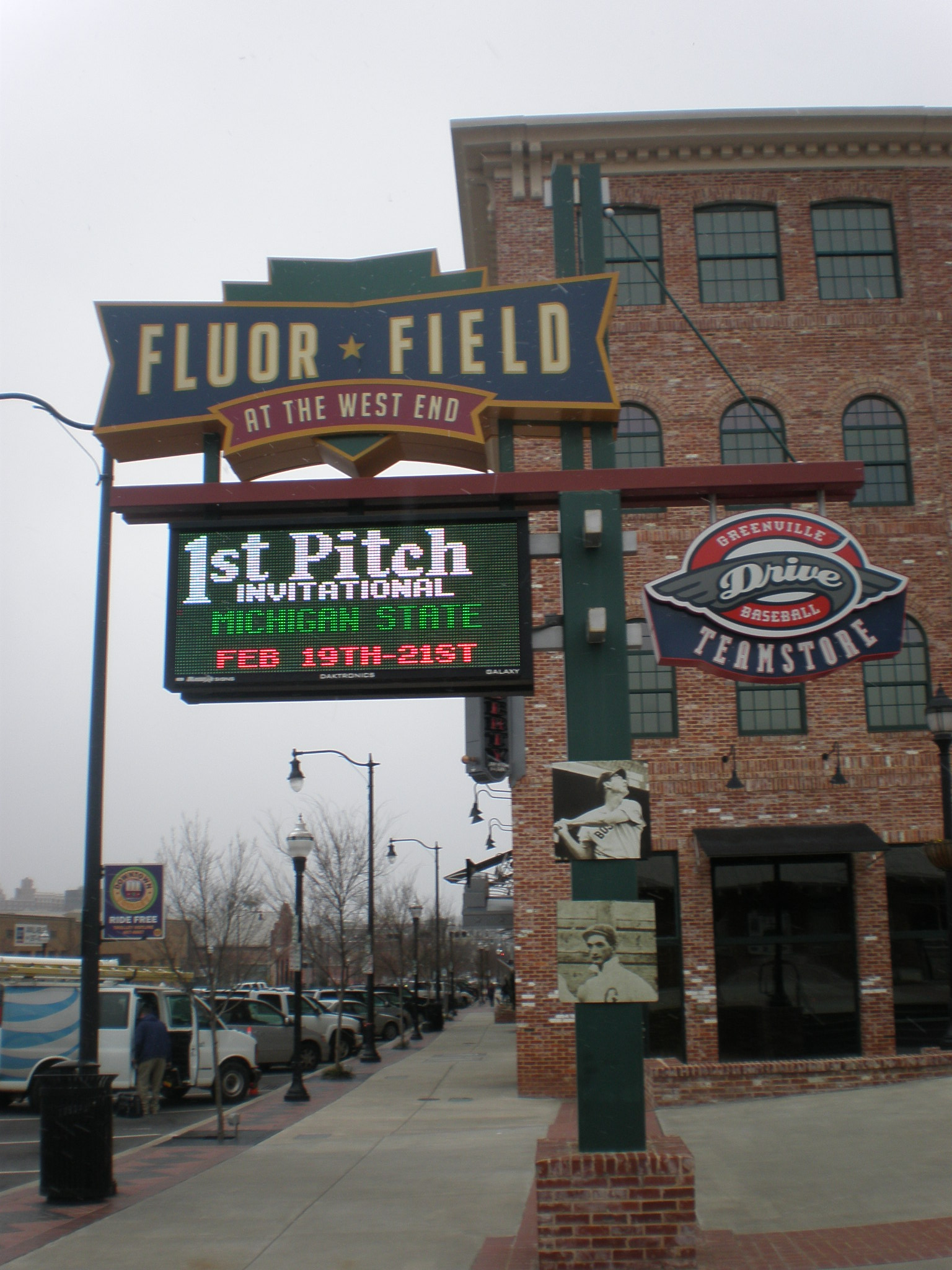
Greenville Drive Scrolling Marquee Welcome Sign

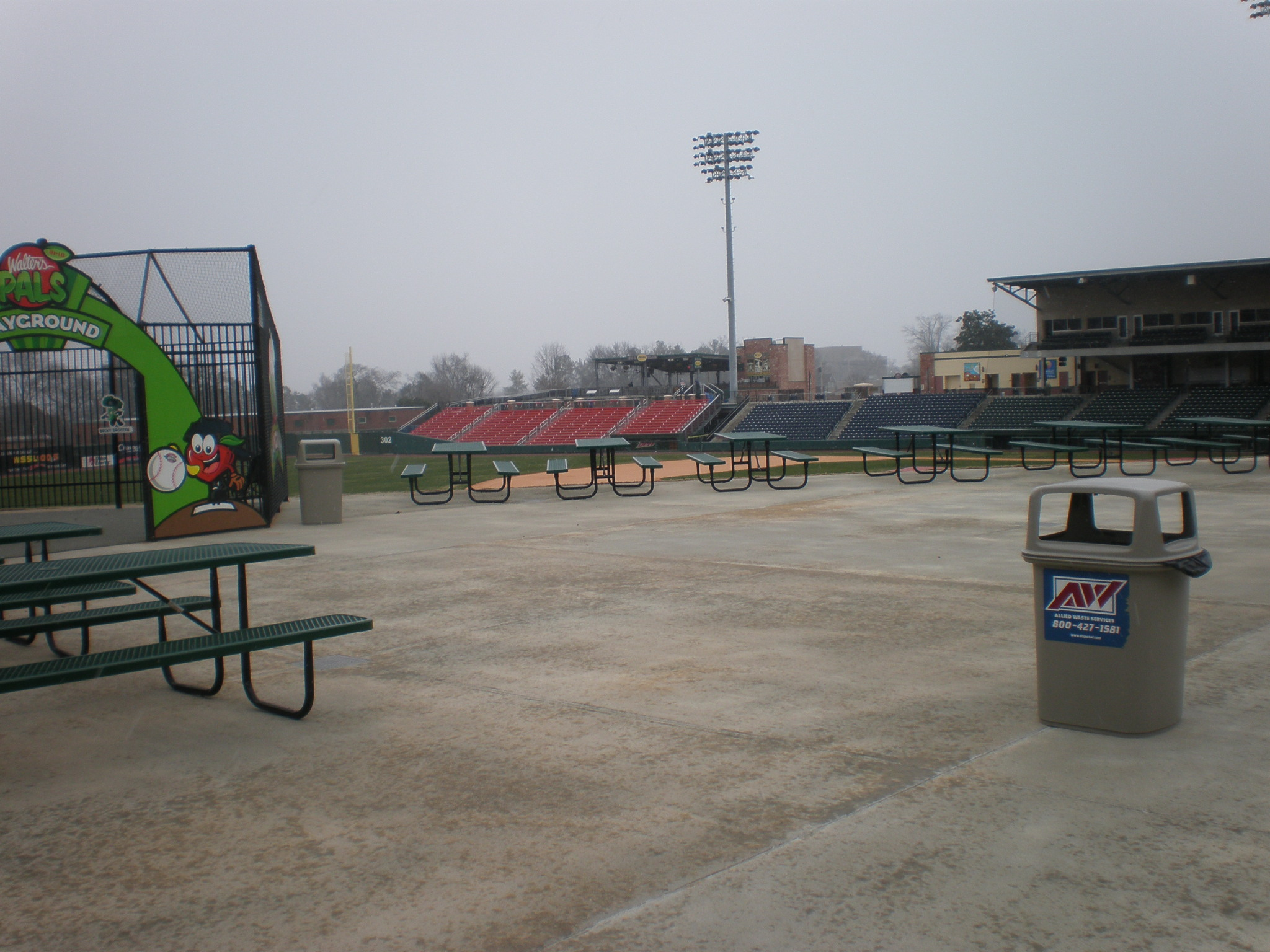
Seating at Fluor Field

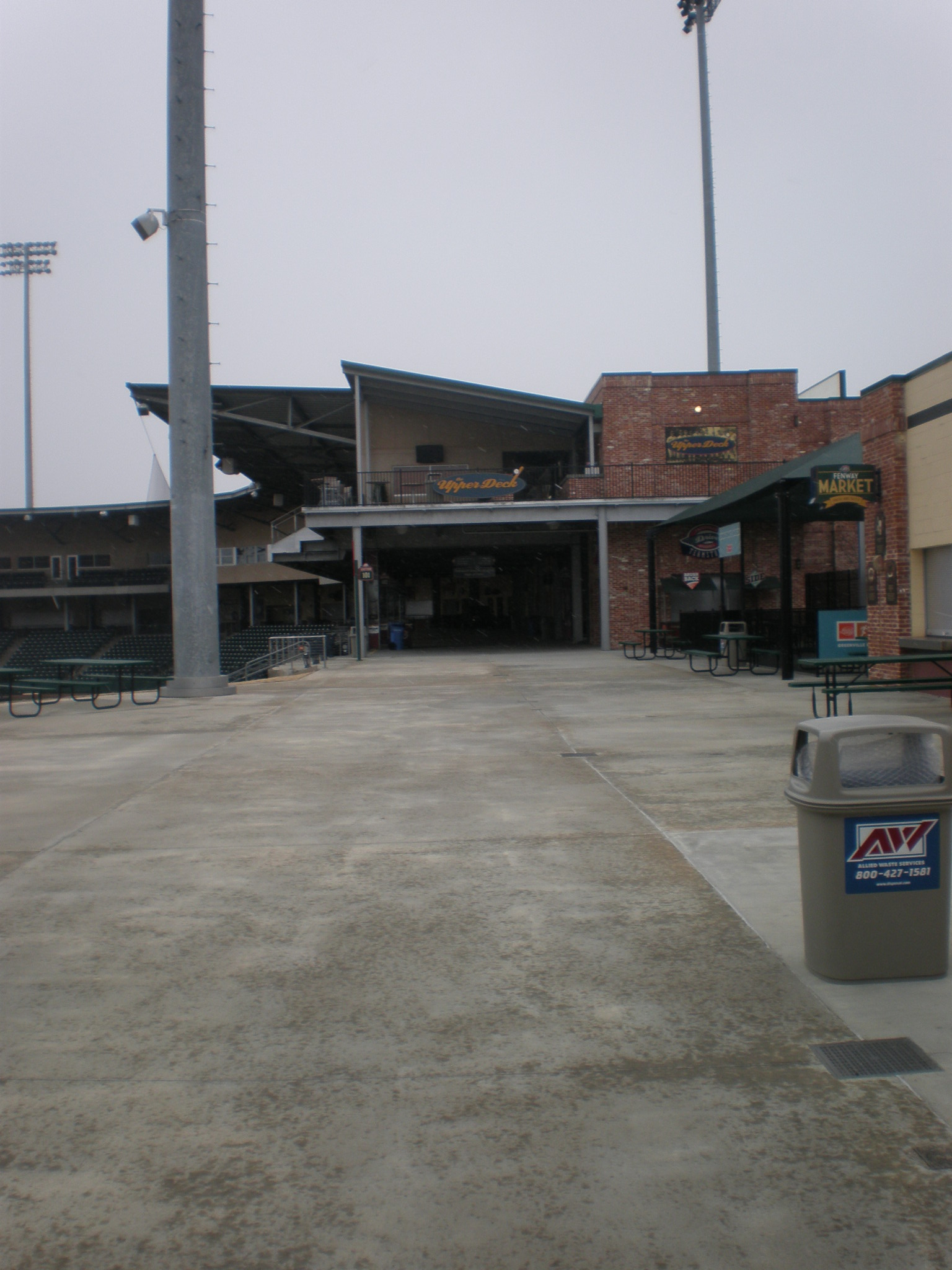
Entrance at Fluor Field

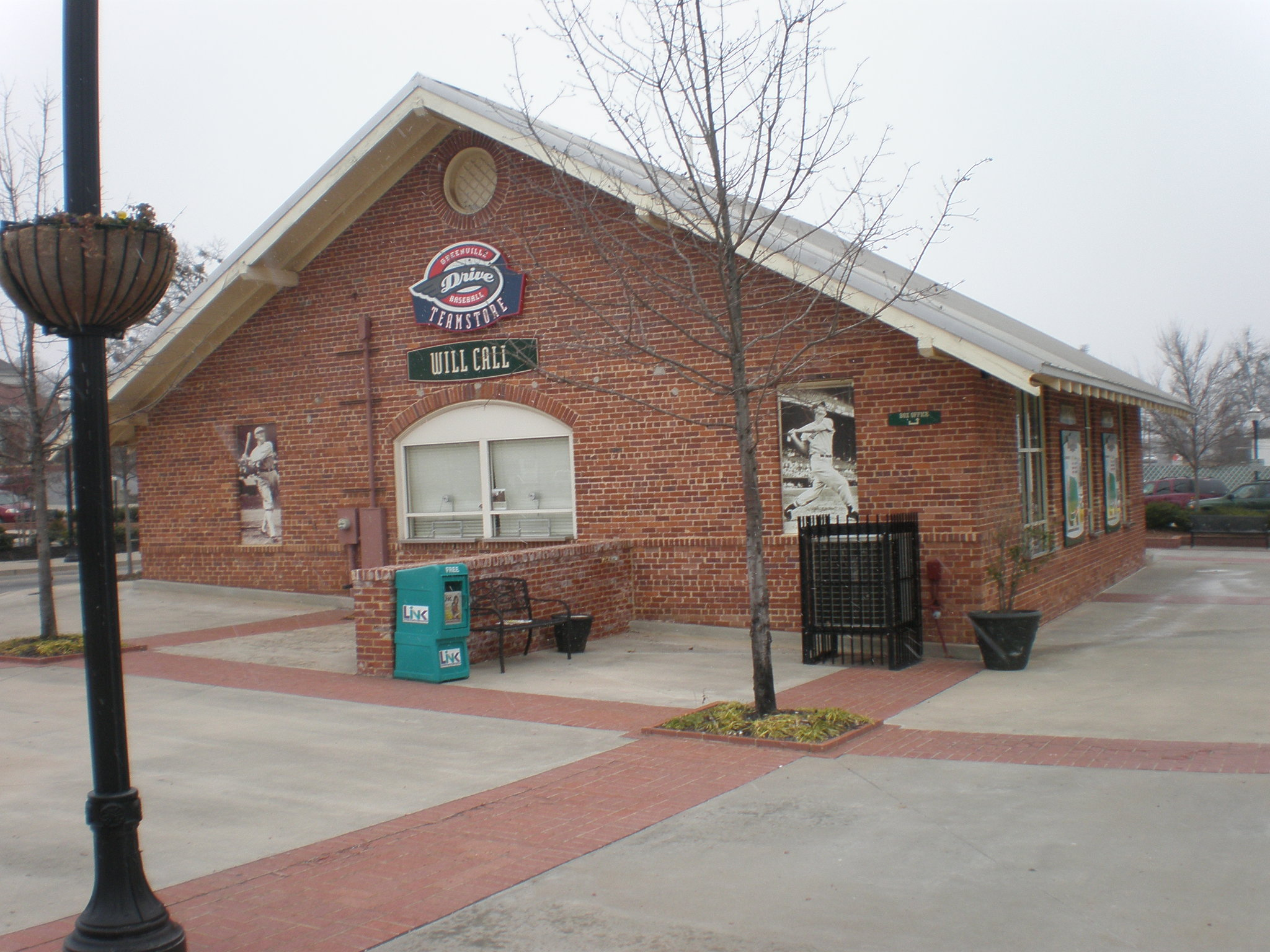
Greenville Drive Team Store

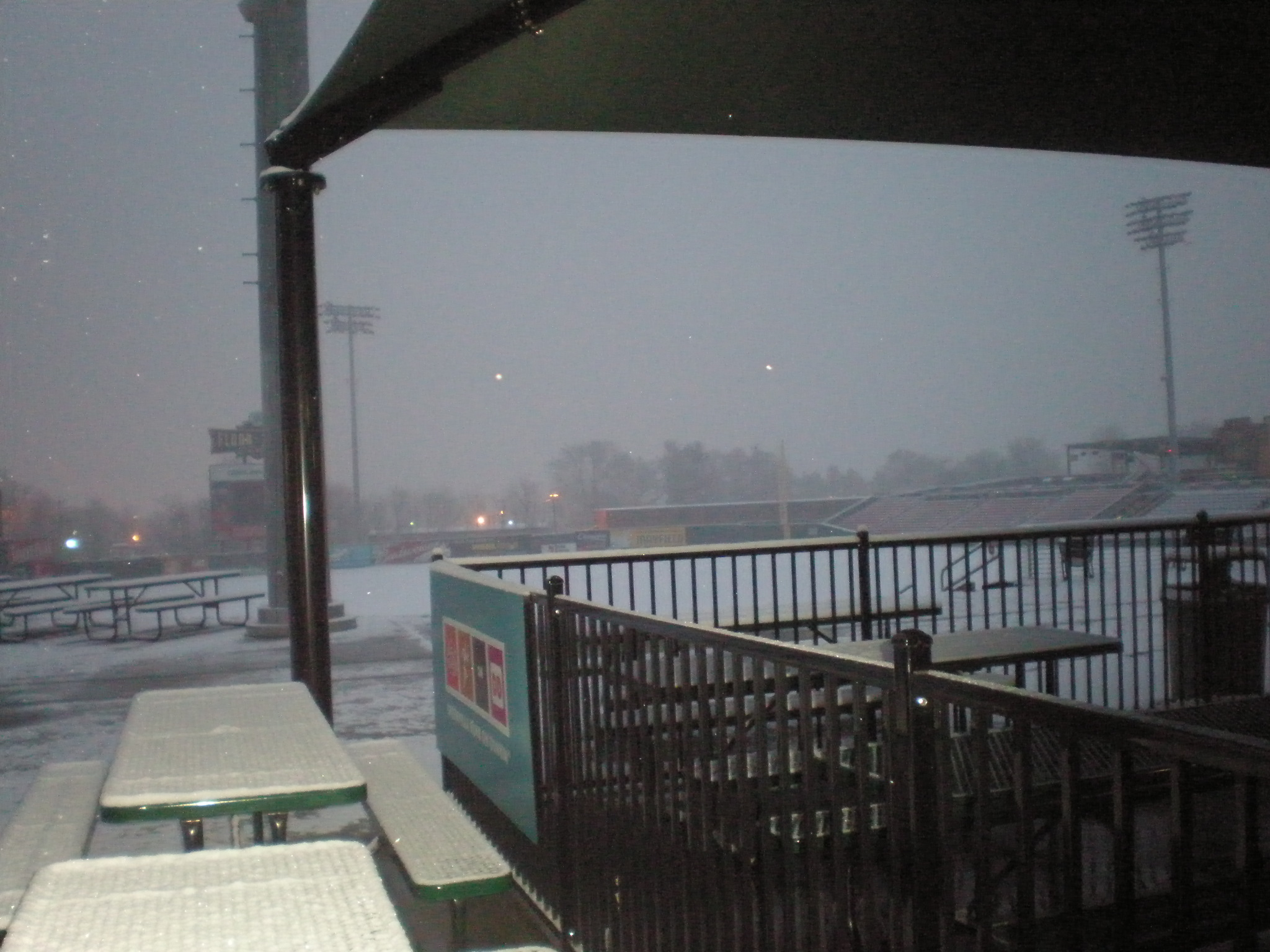
Fluor Field covered with snow, February 12, 2010
