= South Atlantic League =

American sports league in Minor League Baseball

- Current season, competition or edition: 2026 South Atlantic League season
- Formerly: Western Carolinas League
- Classification: High-A (2021–present); Class A (1963–2020)
- Sport: Baseball
- Founded: 1963 (63 years ago)
- No. of teams: 12
- Country: United States
- Most recent champion: Winston-Salem Dash (2026)
- Most titles: Greenville Drive (5)

The South Atlantic League, often informally called the Sally League, is a Minor League Baseball league with teams predominantly in states along the Atlantic coast of the United States from New York to Georgia. A Class A league for most of its history, the league was promoted to High-A as part of Major League Baseball's 2021 reorganization of the minor leagues. The league temporarily operated for the 2021 season as the High-A East before reassuming its original moniker in 2022.

A number of different leagues known as the South Atlantic League (SAL) have existed since 1904. The most recent SAL adopted the moniker in 1980, having previously been the Western Carolinas League, founded in 1963. All of these have been nicknamed "Sally League".

== History ==
There have been several South Atlantic Leagues in the history of minor league baseball, spanning from 1904 to the present with a few breaks. The league ran from 1904 to 1917 as a class C league, then started up again in 1919, also class C. This time it ran from 1919 to 1930, moving up to class B beginning in 1921. William G. Bramham became league president in mid-1924 and served until 1930. The league was restarted again as a class B from 1936 to 1942, shut down as a result of World War II, and returned in 1946 as a class A league. The AA Southern Association (which never integrated) died after the 1961 season and so the SAL was promoted to AA in 1963 to take its place; a year later the name was changed to the Southern League. Out of the 51 seasons of operation, Augusta, Georgia competed in 46, Macon, Georgia was around for 46, and Columbia, South Carolina was in 45. Charleston, South Carolina; Jacksonville, Florida; Savannah, Georgia; and Columbus, Georgia; each competed for at least 29 years also, making for a relatively stable lineup.

The South Atlantic League name went unused for 16 years, but in 1980 the Western Carolinas League brought back the name when it sought to change its identity. For nearly 60 years, 1948 through 2007, the dominant figure in the WCL/SAL was league founder and president John Henry Moss, who started the WCL as a young man in 1948, refounded it in 1960 and then led it into the new century. Moss retired at the close of the 2007 South Atlantic League season. He died at age 90 on July 1, 2009, at Kings Mountain, North Carolina—a town where he had also been mayor for 23 years.

In 2005, the SAL had the highest attendance in 101 years with over 3,541,992 fans (while minor league baseball set a second straight record with 41,333,279 attendees). When the league last played a season, in 2019, it had 14 teams, divided into two divisions of seven clubs.

The start of the 2020 season was postponed due to the COVID-19 pandemic before ultimately being cancelled on June 30.

As part of Major League Baseball's 2021 reorganization of the minor leagues, the South Atlantic League was promoted to High-A and temporarily renamed the "High-A East" for the 2021 season. Following MLB's acquisition of the rights to the names of the historical minor leagues, the High-A East was renamed the South Atlantic League effective with the 2022 season.

In July 2024, MiLB announced that the Hub City Spartanburgers will join the South Atlantic League in 2025, replacing the Hickory Crawdads.

In August 2025, it was announced that the Frederick Keys and Aberdeen IronBirds would swap leagues starting in 2026, with the Keys joining the SAL and the IronBirds joining MLB Draft League, a hybrid collegiate summer/professional league outside of MiLB.

== Current teams ==
Division	Team	MLB affiliation	City	Stadium	Capacity
North	Brooklyn Cyclones	New York Mets	Brooklyn, New York	Maimonides Park	7,000
North	Frederick Keys	Baltimore Orioles	Frederick, Maryland	Harry Grove Stadium	5,400
North	Greensboro Grasshoppers	Pittsburgh Pirates	Greensboro, North Carolina	First National Bank Field	7,499
North	Hudson Valley Renegades	New York Yankees	Wappingers Falls, New York	Heritage Financial Park	5,400
North	Jersey Shore BlueClaws	Philadelphia Phillies	Lakewood, New Jersey	ShoreTown Ballpark	8,000
North	Wilmington Blue Rocks	Washington Nationals	Wilmington, Delaware	Daniel S. Frawley Stadium	6,404
South	Asheville Tourists	Houston Astros	Asheville, North Carolina	HomeTrust Park	4,000
South	Bowling Green Hot Rods	Tampa Bay Rays	Bowling Green, Kentucky	Bowling Green Ballpark	4,559
South	Greenville Drive	Boston Red Sox	Greenville, South Carolina	Fluor Field at the West End	6,700
South	Hub City Spartanburgers	Texas Rangers	Spartanburg, South Carolina	Fifth Third Park	5,000
South	Rome Emperors	Atlanta Braves	Rome, Georgia	AdventHealth Stadium	5,105
South	Winston-Salem Dash	Chicago White Sox	Winston-Salem, North Carolina	Truist Stadium	5,500

North Division, South Division

== South Atlantic League teams (1980–present) ==
Notes: • An "^" indicates that team's article redirects to an article of an active team in a different league

- Aberdeen IronBirds
- Albany Polecats
- Anderson Braves
- Asheville Tourists
- Augusta GreenJackets^
- Augusta Reds
- Bowling Green Hot Rods
- Brooklyn Cyclones
- Cape Fear Crocs
- Capital City Bombers
- Charleston Alley Cats
- Charleston Bombers
- Charleston Pirates
- Charleston Rainbows
- Charleston RiverDogs^
- Charleston Royals
- Charleston Wheelers
- Charleston Yankees
- Columbia Fireflies^
- Columbia Mets
- Columbus Catfish
- Columbus Indians
- Columbus RedStixx
- Delmarva Shorebirds^
- Fayetteville Generals
- Florence Blue Jays
- Gastonia Cardinals
- Gastonia Expos
- Gastonia Jets
- Gastonia Rangers
- Gastonia Tigers
- Greensboro Bats
- Greensboro Grasshoppers
- Greensboro Hornets
- Greenwood Pirates
- Greenville Drive
- Hagerstown Suns
- Hickory Crawdads
- Hudson Valley Renegades
- Jersey Shore BlueClaws
- Kannapolis Cannon Ballers^
- Kannapolis Intimidators
- Lake County Captains
- Lakewood BlueClaws
- Lexington Legends^
- Macon Braves
- Macon Peaches
- Macon Pirates
- Macon Redbirds
- Myrtle Beach Blue Jays
- Myrtle Beach Hurricanes
- Piedmont Boll Weevils
- Piedmont Phillies
- Rome Braves
- Rome Emperors
- Santee Indians
- Santee Pirates
- Savannah Cardinals
- Savannah Sand Gnats
- Shelby Mets
- Shelby Pirates
- South Georgia Waves
- Spartanburg Traders
- Spartanburg Phillies
- Spartanburg Spinners
- Spartanburg Suns
- Sumter Braves
- Sumter Flyers
- West Virginia Power^
- Wilmington Blue Rocks
- Wilmington Waves
- Winston-Salem Dash

=== League timeline ===
Active team (as of 2025) Earlier team

== South Atlantic League Hall of Fame ==
The South Atlantic League Hall of Fame was started in 1994.
