= Rome Emperors =

Minor League Baseball team based in Rome, Georgia

- Founded in 2003; Rome, Georgia

Team logo	Cap insignia

Minor league affiliations
- Class: High-A (2021–present)
- Previous classes: Class A (2003–2020)
- League: South Atlantic League (2003–present)
- Division: South Division

Major league affiliations
- Team: Atlanta Braves (2003–present)

Minor league titles
- League titles (2): 2003; 2016
- Division titles (2): 2003; 2016
- First-half titles (1): 2024
- Second-half titles (1): 2022

Team data
- Name: Rome Emperors (2024–present)
- Previous names: Rome Braves (2003–2023)
- Colors: Black, red, gold, white
- Mascot: Julius
- Ballpark: AdventHealth Stadium (2003–present)
- Owner/ Operator: Diamond Baseball Holdings / Atlanta National League Baseball Club, Inc.
- General manager: David Lane
- Manager: Wynston Sawyer
- Website: milb.com/rome

The Rome Emperors are a Minor League Baseball team of the South Atlantic League and the High-A affiliate of the Atlanta Braves. They are located in Rome, Georgia, and play their home games at AdventHealth Stadium. From 2003 to 2023, the team was known as the Rome Braves. They served as Atlanta's Class A affiliate before being elevated to High-A with the restructuring of the minor league system in 2021.

== History ==
=== Organization's historical beginnings ===
A longstanding member of the current iteration South Atlantic League since its inception, the Class A Atlanta Braves affiliate's history dates back to 1968 with the founding of the Greenwood Braves, sporting a roster featuring future major league talents such as Dusty Baker and Earl Williams. Later incarnations of the club would include Steve Bedrosian, Dale Murphy, and Rafael Ramirez. The team was part of the Western Carolinas League from 1968 to 1979 winning three league titles before being moved to Anderson, South Carolina. The Anderson team received a great deal of support and experienced relatively high attendance figures during its short run. Despite the local support though, former Atlanta Braves owner Ted Turner moved the team to Sumter, South Carolina, after the 1984 season to establish the Sumter Braves. Sumter was a starting point for several major league talents, including an early stop for future Baseball Hall of Fame pitcher Tom Glavine. Sumter hosted the team for six seasons from 1985 to 1990. Notably for both Anderson and Sumter, their best finishes while in both locations came in seasons managed by future Atlanta manager Brian Snitker, who brought the Anderson team to a 72–70 fifth-place finish in 1982, and a 77–60 third-place finish for Sumter in 1986. In Sumter, the team also earned their first opportunity in the SAL Playoffs as the First Half Champion of the 1985 North Division, going on to lose to the Greensboro Hornets in 2 games.

=== The Macon Braves ===
In 1991, the low league Braves saw themselves on the move once more when they transplanted the team to Macon, Georgia, thus becoming the Macon Braves. Macon had a very long history with minor league baseball before their time with the Braves, with the earliest assumed records dating back to 1885 with some nameless forms before their predominant history as the Macon Peaches in the original iteration of the South Atlantic League, which is still active today as the AA Southern League. The Braves brought baseball back to Macon following a three-season gap with the departure of the Pirates affiliate in 1987. As the Macon Braves, the team saw marginal success, earning a playoff bid in their inaugural 1991 season (2–0 series loss to the Columbia Mets), mid or lower pack of the SAL South Division from 1992 to 1996, a 1997 South Division Championship in 1997 which saw them win their first-ever Playoff series with a 2–1 win over the Augusta GreenJackets before falling to the Greensboro Bats 2–0 in the following round, subsequent Playoff runs in 1998 (2–0 series loss to Augusta) and 1999 (2–0 series loss to the Hickory Crawdads), and mid pack success in their final three seasons in Macon. In total, the team racked up an 850–820 record during their Macon years, with notable alumni such as John Smoltz, Chipper Jones, and Andruw Jones. The Macon Braves would serve as the last time the city would host a major-league affiliated minor league team.

=== Moving to Rome ===
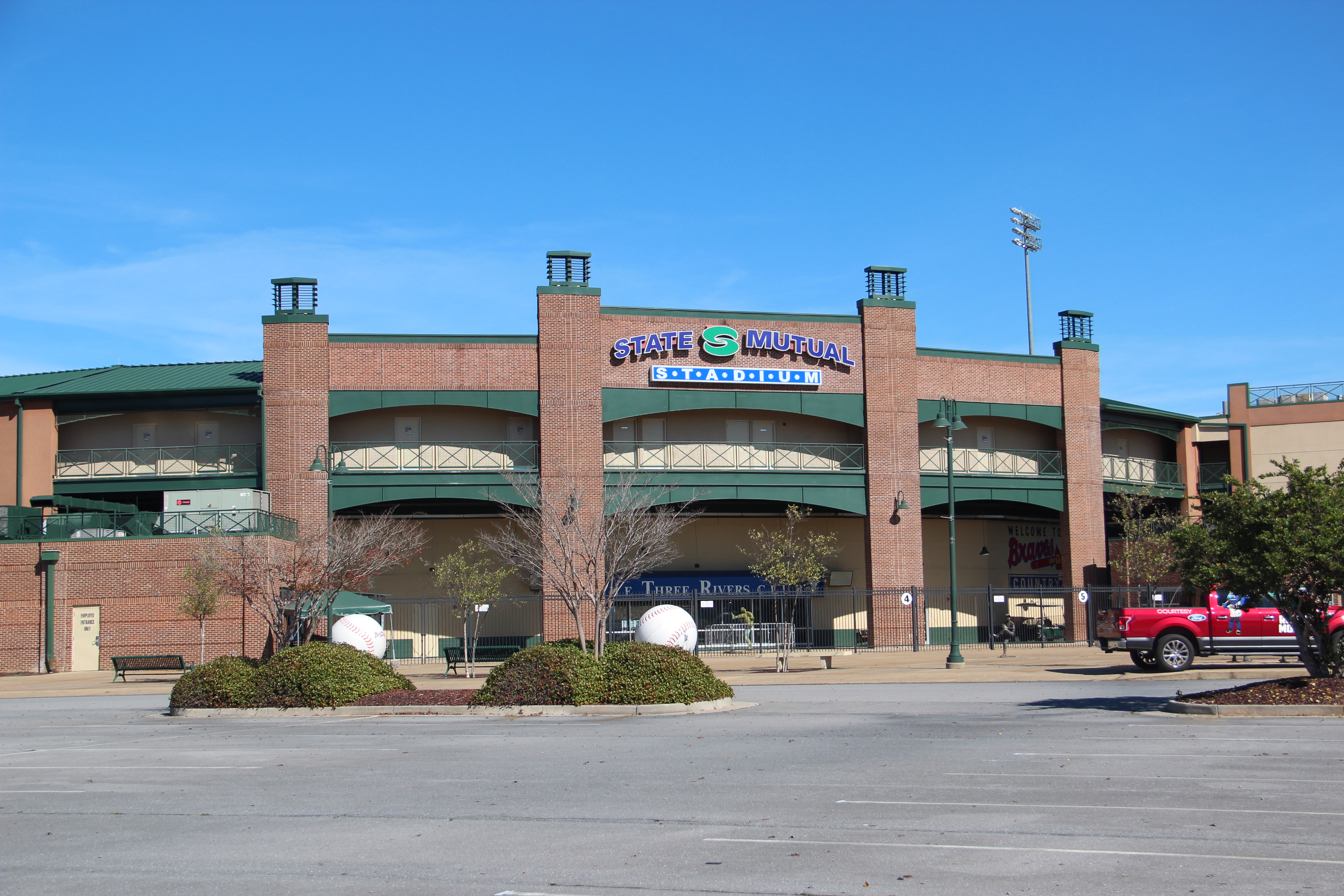
AdventHealth Stadium, home of the Rome Emperors since 2003

Following failed attempts to get the city of Macon to build a new ballpark for the team, as their home at Luther Williams Field was beginning to show its age and with the team still wanting over $1 million in renovations, the end of the 2002 season saw Atlanta decide again to move the franchise. Following the approval of a SPLOST tax, the city of Rome, Georgia, managed to entice the Braves organization, and as a result they became the new home of the Single-A affiliate starting with the 2003 season. The SPLOST tax helped with entirely building their home, AdventHealth Stadium, and a high level of optimism followed the team to Rome.

=== 2003 Inaugural season and championship ===
Rocket Wheeler would be named the manager for the first season in Rome, and the start of his tenure in the Braves organization after previously serving the past three seasons as the manager for the AA then-Toronto Blue Jays affiliate Tennessee Smokies. During their inaugural season in Rome, the team started the first half of the 2003 South Atlantic League season with a 36–33 record, finishing fourth in the Southern Division and well outside the playoff spot won by Hickory. The second half featured a much better effort, with help from two future Braves fan-favorites in Brian McCann and Jeff Francoeur, and Rome got to a 42–38 record to win the Southern Division in the second half of the season and advance to the Playoffs for the time ever in Rome, and the sixth time overall since the original inception of the team in Anderson in 1980. Not only was it a historic first season in Rome by just making it to the playoffs, but the Rome Braves followed this with 2–1 series win over Hickory to advance to their first-ever South Atlantic League Championship, where they met the Lake County Captains. The series went to four games, and in their inaugural season, the Rome Braves won the 2003 South Atlantic League with a 3–1 series win over Lake County.

=== Beginning of Ingle era ===
After their first team championship in 2003, the following two seasons under Rocket Wheeler saw the team finish with a 70–70 record in 2004, and a 72–65 record in 2005, though neither were able to replicate the similar success of either a Championship or even a divisional crown. Rome went for a managerial change for the 2006 season, calling on Randy Ingle. Ingle served in the Braves organization for his entire 14 seasons prior to joining Rome, including two stops in 1993 and 2001 with Macon. He was also coming off of four years as the manager for the then Advanced-A affiliate Myrtle Beach Pelicans. Under Ingle, the 2006 Rome Braves won the first half South Division title with a 42–28 record to secure their first playoff trip since the Championship 2003 season, and finished the season with a 71–68 record and a 2–0 series loss to Augusta in the postseason. 2007–2010 saw the Rome Braves unable to climb out of the lower part of the South Division, finishing with losing records in all four seasons. Ingle would leave the team for the 2011 season, being sent down to manage the rookie league Danville Braves, however Ingle would return to Rome in 2012, as Rome finished the 2011 season with a 60–80 season and two different managers during the season with Matt Walbeck fired midseason by the organization after compiling a 25–45 bottom of the division record which was one of the worst in the minor leagues, and Walbeck being replaced by Rick Albert who led the team to a 35–35 finish. Ingle's 2012 return started off much poorer than the 2011 Rome start, with Rome compiling an 18–52 record in the first half. The second half of the season fared much better for Rome, going 44–24 and securing their first divisional crown in 6 seasons, even despite the overall season finish of 62–72 which would be worst in the Southern Division. The Braves would lose to the eventual 2012 Champion Asheville Tourists 2 games to 1 in their playoff series.

Ingle would serve another season with Rome in 2013, finishing just shy of a second straight trip to the SAL Playoffs during the second half of the season, and finishing with a 73–66 overall record. Jon Schuerholz would take over the team in 2014, swapping managerial duties with Ingle who would return to Danville for 2014. Rome would finish 2014 with a 56–84 record, their third time in the last five seasons that the Braves would finish at the bottom of the South Division in overall record.

Ingle again returned to the team in 2015, producing a disappointing 58–82 record with Rome unable to escape the bottom of the division.

=== 2016 Championship ===
Sporting one of the youngest clubs in full-season baseball, 2016 looked to be starting the same way under Ingle, with a 27–42 having them at 6th in the division heading into the midseason break.

Rome finished the second half of the season with a 43–27 record, returning to the playoffs. The roster featured pitchers Mike Soroka, Kolby Allard, Max Fried, A. J. Minter, and Touki Toussaint, alongside batters Ronald Acuña Jr. and Austin Riley. In the playoffs, Rome defeated the Charleston RiverDogs 2–1 in the semifinals, and then won their second South Atlantic League title by defeating the Lakewood BlueClaws 3–1.

=== Ingle's retirement, Rocket's return, start of Tuiasosopo era ===
Following their second championship season, Ingle would serve one last year as manager for the Rome Braves in 2017, end with his best overall record finish during his time in Rome at 74–65, but coming up short of a return to postseason play. 2018 saw Rome return to their past by bringing back Rocket Wheeler, their manager from the 2003 Championship season and the two seasons following. Wheeler had spent his time since leaving Rome in the Braves organization, taking over the Pelicans for 5 seasons following his original departure, getting 1 season as the manager for the AA Mississippi Braves, and 4 seasons on the rookie level before managing the Braves Advanced A ball for the Carolina Mudcats in 2016 and Florida Fire Frogs in 2017. Wheeler's return in 2018 would show quick results with Rome finishing at the top of the South Division in the first half with a 40–29 record, though a slight slump in the second half gave them a 31–36 record and 71–65 overall on the season. Rome would be eliminated in the playoffs by the second half division champion, and eventual SAL Champion, Lexington Legends in a 2–0 series loss. For 2019 and into the modern day, Matt Tuiasosopo would be named the Rome Braves manager, and he would lead Rome to a 65–74 overall record while missing the playoffs.

=== 2020 Season cancellation and High-A promotion ===
Like the entirety of the MiLB, the 2020 season was postponed and later cancelled for Rome following the COVID-19 pandemic. This also came following an off-season of rumors regarding the complete reorganization of the minor leagues, which would come into fruition following the cancellation of the 2020 season. On December 9, 2020, many of the major league clubs announced their new affiliations, totaling at 120 with each team sporting a Low-A, High-A, AA, and AAA team for 2021 and beyond. Rome was invited, and subsequently accepted said invite, back into the Braves organization as the new High-A affiliate, ending their run since the team's inception as the Low-A affiliate and replacing the Fire Frogs in their new spot. Their fellow South Atlantic League team, the Augusta GreenJackets, would be named the new Low-A affiliate, while the Mississippi Braves and Gwinnett Stripers would retain their status as AA and AAA affiliates for the Braves respectively.

As part of the announcement on February 12, 2021, announcement of the new Professional Development League alignment, Rome accepted their invitation as the High-A affiliate, and signed a new contract with the organization to continue their tenure together through the 2030 season. The announcement also included Rome's new league location, the newly created High-A East, with the Rome Braves joining former South Atlantic League opponents Asheville Tourists, Greensboro Grasshoppers, Greenville Drive, Hickory Crawdads, and Jersey Shore (formerly Lakewood) BlueClaws; alongside new opponents Aberdeen IronBirds, Brooklyn Cyclones, Hudson Valley Renegades, Wilmington Blue Rocks, Bowling Green Hot Rods, and Winston-Salem Dash. In 2022, the High-A East became known as the South Atlantic League, the name historically used by the regional circuit prior to the 2021 reorganization.

=== Emperors ===
After the 20 years of donning the Braves' tomahawk across the chest, the Rome Braves announced on August 11, 2023, that they would be dropping the "Braves" moniker in 2024. On November 16, 2023, the team was renamed the Rome Emperors, with a cap insignia and logo that featured an emperor penguin wearing the laurel wreath and robes of a Roman emperor.

== Team mascot ==
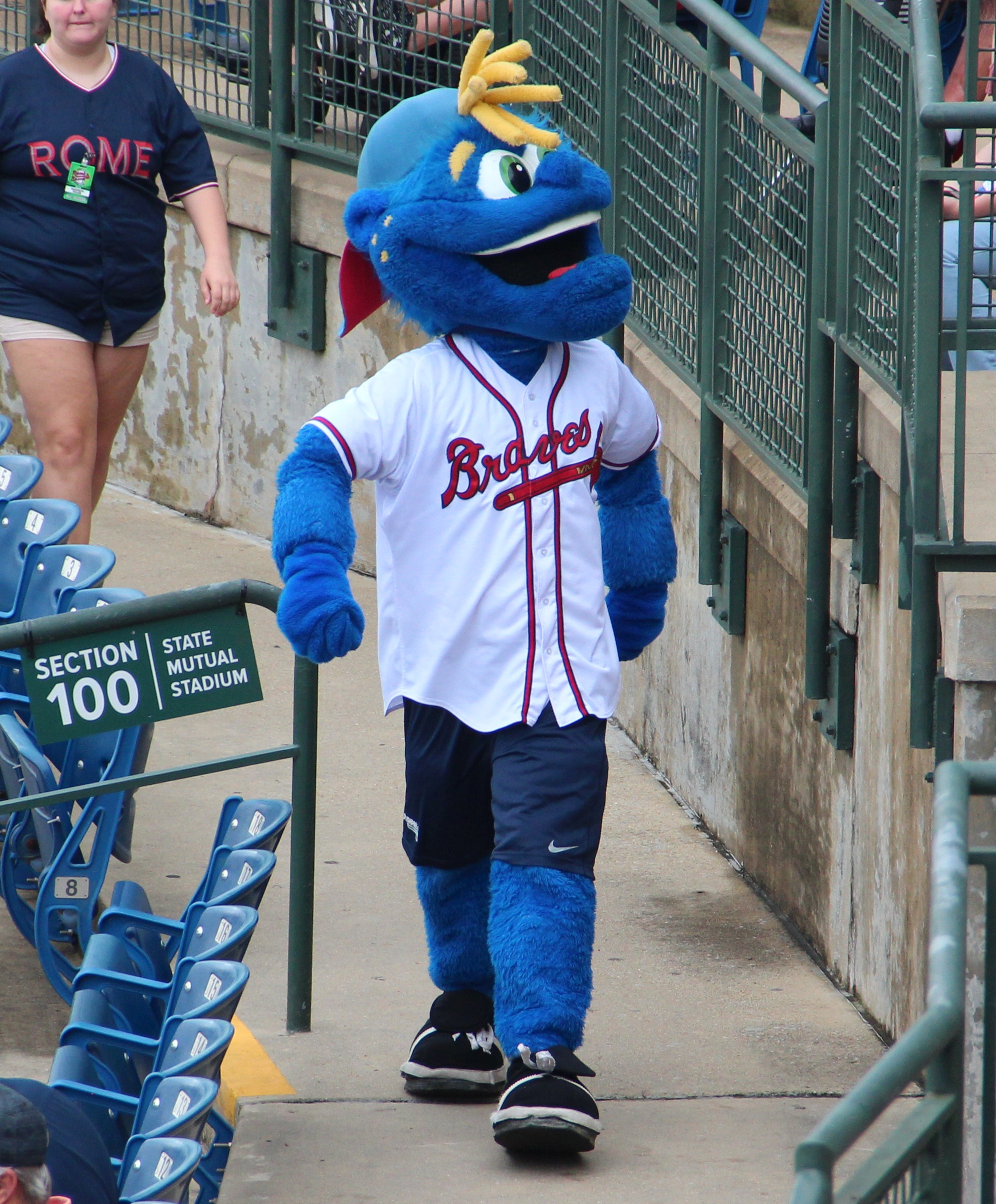
Former Rome mascot Romey

Prior to 2024, Rome had three mascots, Romey, Roxie, and introduced for the 2015 season, their "son" Roman. Romey was a tall (6-foot-3-inch (1.91 m)), blue, furry humanoid male mascot with yellow hair, while Roxie, who was added to the team after the 2005 season, was 5 feet 5 inches (1.65 m) tall, humanoid, a lighter blue, and has a large yellow ponytail. Roman was also a furry blue humanoid male, his blue more matching that of Romey, with the added detail of his head being that of a baseball wearing a Roman soldier helmet.

Following Rome's rebrand in 2024, the team introduced a new mascot, Julius. An emperor penguin, his name is an homage to the Roman leader Julius Caesar.

== Season-by-season records ==
South Atlantic League champions (2003–present) *	Division champions (2003–present) ^

Season	Level	League	Division	Finish	Wins	Losses	Pct.	GB	Postseason	Awards	Ref.
2003	A	SAL *	Southern ^	2nd	78	61	.561	5½	Won First Round (Hickory) 2–1 ^ Won Championship Series (Lake County) 3–1 *		
2004	A	SAL	South	4th	70	70	.500	21			
2005	A	SAL	South	4th	72	65	.526	7½			
2006	A	SAL	South	5th	71	68	.511	21	Lost First Round (Augusta) 0–2		
2007	A	SAL	South	6th	66	74	.471	15			
2008	A	SAL	South	8th	56	81	.409	26			
2009	A	SAL	Southern	6th	66	73	.475	7½			
2010	A	SAL	Southern	7th	59	80	.424	18			
2011	A	SAL	Southern	5th	60	80	.429	19½			
2012	A	SAL	Southern	7th	62	76	.449	25	Lost First Round (Asheville) 1–2		
2013	A	SAL	Southern	4th	73	66	.525	10			
2014	A	SAL	Southern	7th	56	84	.400	34			
2015	A	SAL	Southern	7th	58	82	.414	27½			
2016	A	SAL *	Southern ^	4th	70	69	.504	6	Won First Round (Charleston) 2–1 ^ Won Championship Series (Lakewood) 3–1 *		
2017	A	SAL	Southern	3rd	74	65	.532	5			
2018	A	SAL	Southern	2nd	71	65	.522	5	Lost First Round (Lexington) 0–2		
2019	A	SAL	Southern	5th	65	74	.468	12½			
2020	A	SAL	Southern	Season cancelled due to COVID-19 pandemic							
2021	A+	High-A East	South	4th	56	60	.483	25			
2022	A+	SAL	South	2nd	74	54	.578	3			
2023	A+	SAL	South	3rd	64	68	.485	9.5			
2024	A+	SAL	South	2nd	64	64	.500	10.5	Lost Semi-Finals (Bowling Green 0–2)		
2025	A+	SAL	South	4th	58	70	.453	10.0			

== Roster ==
Rome Emperors roster
Players		Coaches/Other
Pitchers: 53 Ethan Bagwell; 52 Tanner Bauman; 33 Daniel Brooks; 61 Aiven Cabral; 66 Drew Christo; 50 Mathieu Curtis; 45 Blayne Enlow; 49 Brody Fowler; 59 Jacob Kroeger; 32 Cade Kuehler; 60 Justin Long; 24 Carter Lovasz; 28 David Rodriguez; 99 Zach Royse; 51 Logan Samuels; 54 Tyler Schoff; 39 Jarret Whorff	Catchers: 34 Colin Burgess; 4 Jacob Jarrell; 27 Tanner Smith; Infielders: 20 Cade Doughty; 22 Mason Guerra; 26 Colby Jones; 30 Cody Miller; 16 Will Verdung; Outfielders: 7 Carter Beck; 11 Logan Braunschweig; 4 Isaiah Drake; 18 Conor Essenburg; 2 Luis Guanipa	Manager: 13 Wynston Sawyer; Coaches: 55 Philip Caulfield (coach); 15 Connor Justus (hitting); 1 Bobby Moore (coach); 40 Horacio Ramírez (pitching); 60-day injured list: 99 Trent Buchanan; 45 Colin Daniel; 46 Riley Frey (full season); 53 Elison Joseph; 27 Briggs McKenzie; 37 Cory Wall; 7-day injured list; * On Atlanta Braves 40-man roster; ~ Development list; # Rehab assignment; ∞ Reserve list; ‡ Restricted list; § Suspended list; † Temporarily inactive list; Roster updated September 23, 2026; Transactions; → More rosters: MiLB • South Atlantic League; → Atlanta Braves minor league players

== Notable alumni ==
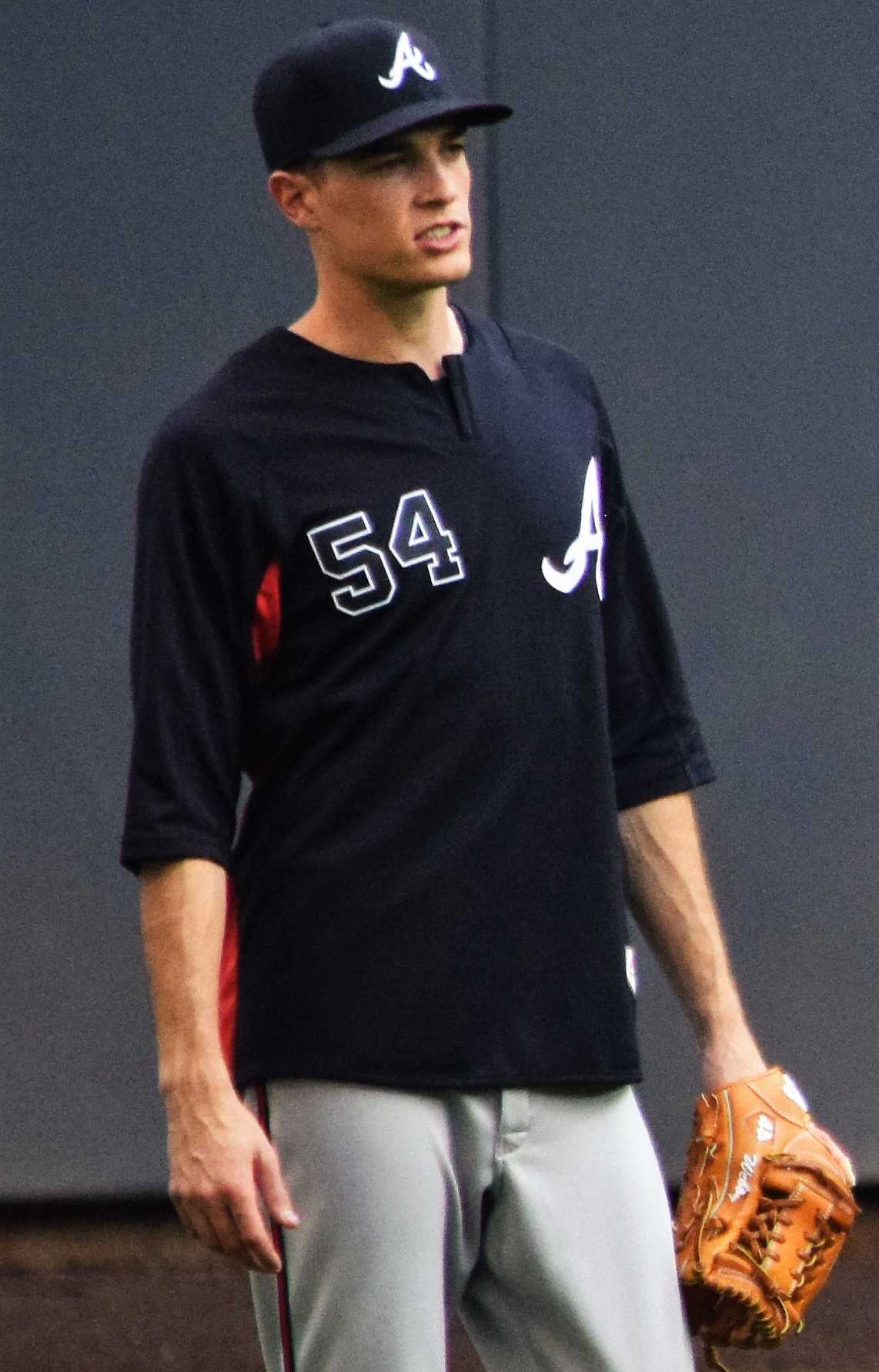
Max Fried

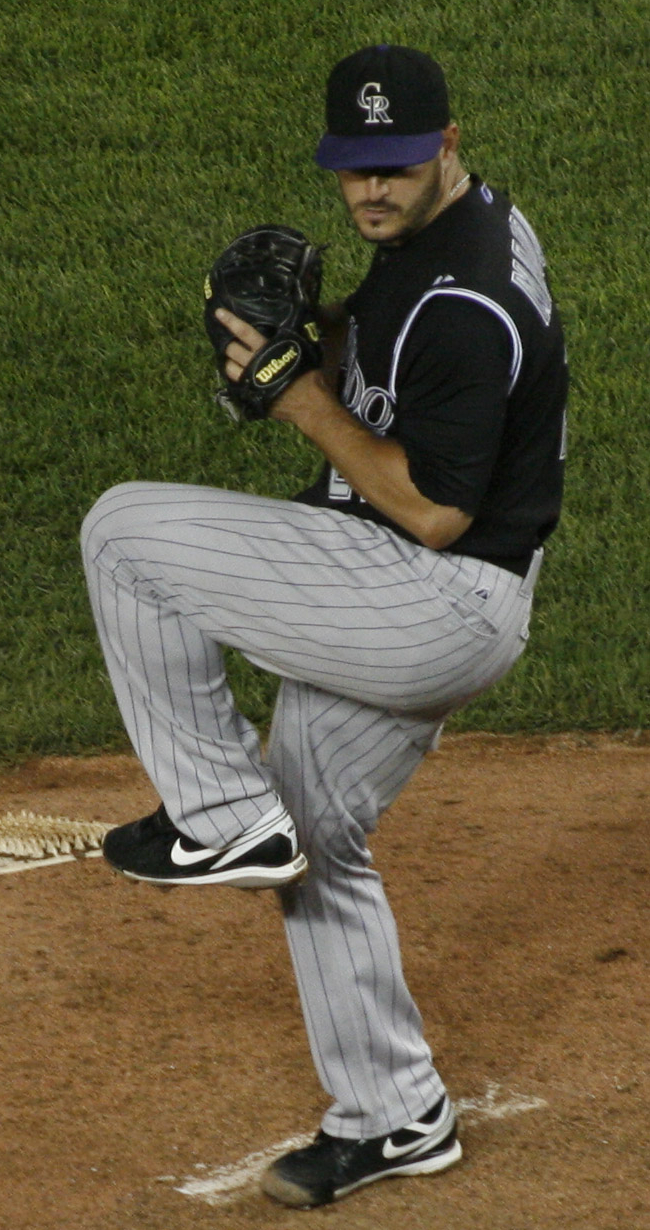
Jason Marquis

Hall of Fame alumni

- Tom Glavine (Played 1 game for the team in 2009)
- Chipper Jones (Played 1 game for the team in 2004, 3 games in 2005, 2 games in 2011, and 2 games in 2012)
- John Smoltz (2008) Inducted, 2016

Notable alumni

- Blaine Boyer
- Kyle Davies
- Yunel Escobar
- Julio Franco (Played 4 games for the team in 2007)
- Jeff Francoeur
- Freddie Freeman
- Max Fried
- Tommy Hanson
- Jason Heyward
- Omar Infante (Played 3 games for the team in 2009)
- Chuck James
- Kelly Johnson (Played 5 games for the team in 2006)
- Brandon Jones
- Brian Jordan (Played 1 game for the team in 2006)
- Jason Marquis (1997)
- Brian McCann
- Martín Prado
- David Ross (Played 2 games for the team in 2009)
- Jo-Jo Reyes
- Jarrod Saltalamacchia
- Ronald Acuña Jr. (2016)
