= Macon Braves =

Minor league baseball team (1991–2002)

- 1991–2002; Macon, Georgia
Team logo
Cap insignia

Minor league affiliations
- Class: Class A (1991–2002)
- League: South Atlantic League (1991–2002)

Major league affiliations
- Team: Atlanta Braves (1991–2002)

Minor league titles
- Division titles (3): 1997; 1998; 1999
- First-half titles (1): 1997
- Second-half titles (3): 1991; 1997; 1998
- Wild card berths (1): 1999

Team data
- Name: Macon Braves (1991–2002)
- Colors: Navy, scarlet, white, gold
- Ballpark: Luther Williams Field (1991–2002)

The Macon Braves were a Minor League Baseball team based in Macon, Georgia, that served as the Class A farm team of the Atlanta Braves between 1991 and 2002. The Macon Braves played their home games at Luther Williams Field for all 12 years of their existence.

The team began play in 1991 when the Sumter Braves relocated from Sumter, South Carolina. After the 2002 season, the Macon Braves moved to Rome, Georgia, where they became known as the Rome Braves.

== History ==
After the 1990 season, the Sumter Braves moved to Macon, Georgia and became the Macon Braves. Macon had been without a minor league team since 1987, when the Macon Pirates moved to Augusta, Georgia, and became the Augusta Pirates.

The Macon Braves' first season began on April 11, 1991, with a 2–0 win against the Columbus Indians at Luther Williams Field.

Over the years, many future MLB stars played for Macon, such as Chipper Jones, Jermaine Dye, Kevin Millwood, Andruw Jones, Marcus Giles, Rafael Furcal, and Adam Wainwright.

After the 2002 season, the Macon Braves moved to Rome, Georgia, where they became known as the Rome Braves. After the 2023 season, the team rebranded and is now known as the Rome Emperors.

== Season by season results ==
^{‡} = won 1st half; ^{§} = won 2nd half
Year	Aff.	League	Division	W–L	Win%	Place	Manager	Postseason	Attendance	Ref.
Macon Braves
1991	ATL	SAL	South	83–58	.589	2nd ^{§}	Roy Majtyka	Lost 1st round 0–2 vs Columbia	107,059	
1992	ATL	SAL	South	58–81	.417	6th	Brian Snitker	–	88,833	
1993	ATL	SAL	South	74–67	.525	3rd	Randy Ingle	–	96,450	
1994	ATL	SAL	South	73–64	.533	3rd	Leon Roberts	–	87,476	
1995	ATL	SAL	South	71–70	.504	4th	Nelson Norman	–	113,825	
1996	ATL	SAL	South	61–79	.436	4th	Paul Runge	–	117,042	
1997	ATL	SAL	South	80–60	.571	1st ^{‡§}	Brian Snitker	Won 1st round 2–1 vs Augusta; Lost finals 0–2 vs Greensboro	129,723	
1998	ATL	SAL	South	69–72	.489	1st ^{§}	Brian Snitker	Lost 1st round 0–2 vs Augusta	120,009	
1999	ATL	SAL	South	74–64	.536	1st	Jeff Treadway	Lost 1st round 0–2 vs Hickory	115,897	
2000	ATL	SAL	Southern	69–70	.496	4th	Jeff Treadway	–	127,470	
2001	ATL	SAL	Southern	72–61	.541	2nd	Randy Ingle	–	114,001	
2002	ATL	SAL	Southern	66–74	.471	5th	Lynn Jones	–	84,001	
Totals				850–820	.509				1,301,786	
