= Greenville Drive =

- Founded in 1977 in Shelby, North Carolina; Based in Greenville, South Carolina since 2005
Team logo
Cap insignia

Minor league affiliations
- Class: High-A (2021–present)
- Previous classes: Class A (1977–2020)
- League: South Atlantic League (1994–present)
- Division: South Division

Major league affiliations
- Team: Boston Red Sox (2005–present)
- Previous teams: New York Mets (1981–2004); Pittsburgh Pirates (1979–1980); Cincinnati Reds (1977–1978)

Minor league titles
- League titles (5): 1986; 1991; 1998; 2017; 2023
- Division titles (2): 2017; 2023
- First-half titles (1): 2023

Team data
- Name: Greenville Drive (2006–present)
- Previous names: Greenville Bombers (2005); Capital City Bombers (1993–2004); Columbia Mets (1983–1992); Shelby Mets (1981–1982); Shelby Pirates (1979–1980); Shelby Reds (1977–1978)
- Colors: Red, midnight navy, gray, white, green
- Mascot: Reedy Rip'it
- Ballpark: Fluor Field at the West End (2006–present)
- Previous parks: Greenville Municipal Stadium (2005); Capital City Stadium (1983–2004); Veterans Field (1977–1982)
- Owner/ Operator: Craig Brown
- General manager: Eric Jarinko
- Manager: Liam Carroll
- Website: milb.com/greenville

The Greenville Drive are a Minor League Baseball team based in Greenville, South Carolina. (Note: Greenville is 932 miles (1,500 km) from Fenway Park in Boston.) They are the High-A affiliate of the Boston Red Sox and are a member of the South Atlantic League. They play their home games at Fluor Field at the West End, and their mascot is a frog named Reedy Rip'it.

An affiliate of the New York Mets from 1983 to 2004, the team played in Columbia, South Carolina as the Columbia Mets (1983–92) and then as the Capital City Bombers (1993–04). In the team's first season as a Red Sox affiliate, 2005, they were known as the Greenville Bombers.

== History ==
The Drive began their history in 1977 as the Shelby Reds, an expansion franchise in the league then known as the Western Carolinas League. In 1980, the league changed its name to the South Atlantic League, reflecting its expansion beyond the Carolinas into Georgia. After two seasons as a Pirates affiliate, and then two with the Mets, the franchise relocated to Columbia, South Carolina in 1983. The team played as the Columbia Mets from 1983 through the 1992 season, after which they were rechristened as the Capital City Bombers. The name was chosen to honor members of the Doolittle Raiders, who had conducted their initial training in Columbia. The club won the South Atlantic League championship in 1986, 1991 and 1998.

Following the 2004 season, the Bombers changed affiliations and became the affiliate of the Boston Red Sox, who had previously been affiliated with the SAL's Augusta GreenJackets. On February 11, 2005, Minor League Baseball announced that the Bombers had been granted permission to move to Greenville, where a new park opened in 2006. The Bombers would play in Greenville Municipal Stadium in 2005.

On October 27, 2005, the Bombers announced the team's name would change to the Drive. The name was chosen due to the presence of BMW US Manufacturing and Michelin in the area and, more generally, due to Greenville's rich automotive past. An alternative name was chosen after Shoeless Joe Jackson called the Joes but Major League Baseball vetoed the name due to his role in the Black Sox Scandal in 1919.

In 2008, outfielder Che-Hsuan Lin became the first Drive player to be selected to the annual All-Star Futures Game, which took place on July 13 at Yankee Stadium. Lin hit a two-run home run on the first pitch he saw that helped the World team beat the US Team, 3–0. He finished 2-for-2 and was named the game's Most Valuable Player. Former pitcher Clay Buchholz participated in the 2007 edition, a season after playing for the Drive.

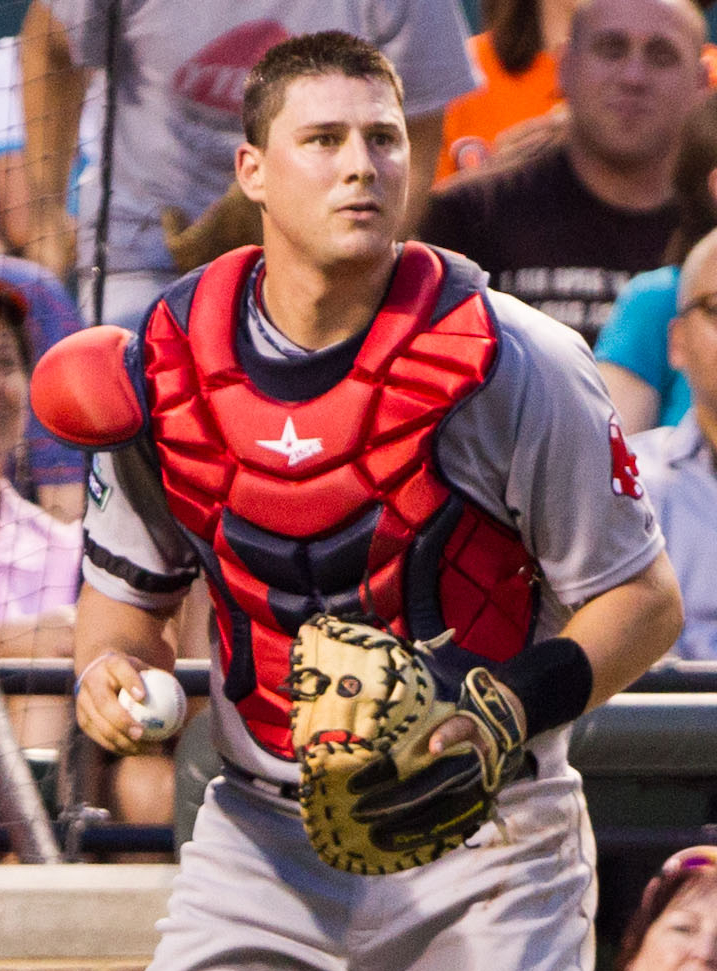
Ryan Lavarnway

In 2009, Ryan Lavarnway played for the Drive, hitting 21 home runs and a .540 slugging percentage (both tops for Red Sox minor leaguers) and 87 RBIs in 404 at bats.

On May 8, 2012, three Greenville pitchers combined to toss the club's first ever no-hitter. Miguel Pena (six innings), Hunter Cervenka (two), and Tyler Lockwood (one) joined forces to defeat the Rome Braves, 1–0. A solo home run by Keury De La Cruz off of David Filak in the sixth inning accounted for the only run of the game.

In the 2017 postseason, the team defeated the Kannapolis Intimidators, 3 games to 1, to win the franchise's first championship since becoming the Greenville Drive in 2006.

The Drive had an in-state rivalry with the Charleston RiverDogs, an affiliate of the New York Yankees, while in the South Atlantic League. This particular rivalry was also fueled by the regional rivalry between the two parent clubs.

In conjunction with Major League Baseball's restructuring of Minor League Baseball in 2021, the team moved from being the Red Sox' Class A affiliate to being their High-A affiliate, and became a member of the High-A East league; in a corresponding move, the Salem Red Sox moved from Class A-Advanced to Low-A. In 2022, the High-A East became known as the South Atlantic League, the name historically used by the regional circuit prior to the 2021 reorganization.

== Stadium ==
Capital City Stadium in downtown Columbia, was the home of the Bombers. The stadium was originally built in 1927, but was completely rebuilt in 1991. Capital City Stadium has a seating capacity for 6,000 spectators, has a grass surface and features the following fence dimensions: (LF) 330 ft., CF 400 ft., RF 320 ft.

The Bombers had sought assistance from the City of Columbia in building a new stadium located in the Congaree Vista area of Columbia. Efforts to construct a stadium to be shared with the University of South Carolina's baseball team fell through when the university demanded the Bombers pay $6 million in fees upfront. Following this, Bombers owner Rich Mozingo sought to relocate the team.

Mozingo's efforts paid off when, in 2005, the Bombers relocated to Greenville, South Carolina. Following the move, the Bombers played their home contests in Greenville Municipal Stadium in Greenville, then moved to Fluor Field at the West End, in the heart of downtown Greenville. The stadium was named "Ballpark of the Year" for the 2006 season by Baseballparks.com, beating out such stadiums as St. Louis's Busch Stadium and Medlar Field at Lubrano Park in State College, Pennsylvania.

The stadium shares the dimensions of their parent club's major league park, Fenway Park, and boasts its own (slightly shorter) "Green Monster" complete with manual scoreboard and "Pesky's Pole" in right field.

== Season-by-season records ==
Below are the season records for the Capital City Bombers, Greenville Bombers, and Greenville Drive.

=== Capital City Bombers ===
The team competed in the South Atlantic League (Class A).

Season	Division	Record	Pct.	Division finish	League rank	Manager	Playoffs
1993	South	64–77	.454	6th	10th	Ron Washington	
1994†	South	59–76	.437	5th	12th	Ron Washington	
1995	South	72–68	.514	3rd	8th	Howie Freiling	
1996	Central	82–57	.590	2nd	2nd	Howie Freiling	Lost to Asheville Tourists, 2–0
1997	Central	77–63	.550	1st	3rd	Doug Mansolino‡ John Stephenson	Lost to Greensboro Bats, 2–0
1998	Central	90–51	.638	1st	1st	Doug Davis	Defeated Piedmont Boll Weevils, 2–0; Defeated Hagerstown Suns, 2–1; Defeated Greensboro Bats, 2–1; League champions
1999	Central	83–58	.589	1st	2nd	Dave Engle	Defeated Greensboro Bats, 2–1; Lost to Cape Fear Crocs, 2–0
2000	South	56–81	.409	7th	13th (t)	John Stephenson	
2001	South	62–73	.459	6th	11th	Ken Oberkfell	
2002	South	75–64	.540	3rd	6th	Tony Tijerina	Lost to Columbus RedStixx, 2–1
2003	South	73–65	.529	5th	7th	Tony Tijerina	
2004	South	89–47	.654	1st	1st	Jack Lind	Defeated Charleston RiverDogs, 2–0; Lost to Hickory Crawdads, 3–0

† The team was known as the "Columbia Bombers" during the 1994 season.
‡ Mansolino resigned on June 18, at the request of the Mets, following the alcohol-related death of player Tim Bishop in April; he was replaced by Stephenson.

=== Greenville Bombers ===
The team competed in the South Atlantic League (Class A).

Season	Division	Record	Pct.	Division finish	League rank	Manager	Playoffs
2005	North	72–66	.522	2nd (t)	6th (t)	Chad Epperson	

=== Greenville Drive ===
The team competed in the South Atlantic League (Class A) through 2020, then moved up to the High-A classification in 2021 as members of the to the High-A East, which became the South Atlantic League in 2022.

Division finish and league rank columns are based on overall regular season records. The South Atlantic League utilized a split-season, with first-half winners and second-half winners of each division meeting in the playoffs; if the same team won both halves of the season, the team with the next best overall record was selected.

Season	Division	Record	Pct.	Division finish	League rank	Manager	Playoffs
2006	Southern	67–73	.479	6th	11th	Luis Alicea	
2007	Southern	58–81	.417	7th	14th	Gabe Kapler	
2008	Southern	70–69	.504	4th	8th	Kevin Boles	
2009	Southern	73–65	.529	3rd	5th	Kevin Boles	Lost in the league finals
2010	Southern	77–62	.554	2nd	3rd	Billy McMillon	Lost in the league finals
2011	Southern	78–62	.557	2nd	4th	Billy McMillon	
2012	Southern	66–73	.475	6th	9th	Carlos Febles	
2013	Southern	51–87	.370	7th	14th	Carlos Febles	
2014	Southern	60–79	.432	5th	10th	Darren Fenster	
2015	Southern	72–68	.514	3rd	6th	Darren Fenster	
2016	Southern	70–69	.504	3rd (t)	8th (t)	Darren Fenster	
2017	Southern	79–60	.568	1st	1st	Darren Fenster	Defeated Charleston in semifinals, 2–1; Defeated Kannapolis in finals, 3–1; League champions
2018	Southern	64–75	.460	7th	12th	Iggy Suarez	
2019	Southern	56–82	.406	6th	13th	Iggy Suarez	
2020	Southern	Season cancelled, COVID-19 pandemic				Iggy Suarez	
2021	South	67–53	.558	3rd	4th	Iggy Suarez	
2022	South	52–78	.400	6th	11th	Iggy Suarez	
2023	South	63–69	.477	4th	9th	Iggy Suarez	Defeated Hickory in semifinals, 2–0; Defeated Hudson Valley in finals, 2–0; League champions
2024	South	63–69	.477	4th	9th	Iggy Suarez	
2025	South	66-66	.500	2nd	5th	Liam Carroll	

== Roster ==
Greenville Drive roster
Players	Coaches/Other
Pitchers: 51 Adam Bates; 39 Calvin Bickerstaff; 45 Alex Bouchard; 30 Dylan Brown; 6 Luis Cohen; 11 Tyler Davis; 28 Matt Duffy; 40 Joey Gartrell; 26 Jason Gilman; 22 Griffin Kilander; 35 Jacob Mayers; 37 Matt McShane; 16 Barrett Morgan; 38 Aaron Nixon; 22 Brandon Neely; 52 Trennor O'Donnell; 23 Marcus Phillips; 29 Shea Sprague; 20 Brady Tygart; Catchers: 24 Ronny Hernandez; 15 Luke Heyman; 19 Gerardo Rodriguez; 9 Hudson White; Infielders: 1 Antonio Anderson; 55 Maximus Martin; 41 Jake Schaffner; 2 Nazzan Zanetello; Outfielders: 44 Carlos Gutierrez; 10 Owen Hull; 25 Isaiah Jackson; 3 Skylar King; 18 Yophery Rodriguez; 12 Stanley Tucker	Manager: 4 Liam Carroll; Coaches: 14 Cody Gracco (assistant hitting); 13 Bob Kipper (pitching coach); 17 Jarrett Pico (hitting); 21 Andrew Sadoski (assistant pitching); 8 Ty Snep (coach); 60-day injured list: 6 Freili Encarnacion; -- Zach Fogell; -- Isaac Stebens (full season); 30 Juan Valera (full season); 7-day injured list; * On Boston Red Sox 40-man roster; ~ Development list; # Rehab assignment; ∞ Reserve list; ‡ Restricted list; § Suspended list; † Temporarily inactive list; Roster updated August 20, 2026; Transactions; → More rosters: MiLB • South Atlantic League; → Boston Red Sox minor league players

== Notable Greenville minor league alumni ==
- Steve Avery (1989) MLB All-Star
- Mookie Betts (2013) 8× MLB All-Star
- Xander Bogaerts (2011) MLB All-Star
- Clay Buchholz (2006) 2× MLB All-Star
- Paul Byrd (2004) 2× MLB All-Star
- Jermaine Dye (1995) 2× MLB All-Star
- Dwight Evans (1970) 3× MLB All-Star
- Rafael Furcal (2000) 3× MLB All-Star; 2000 NL Rookie of the Year
- Marcus Giles (2000) MLB All-Star
- Tom Glavine (1986) 10× MLB All Star, 2× Cy Young winner; Baseball Hall of Fame (2014)
- Bryan Harvey (1997) 2× MLB All-Star
- Andruw Jones (1996) 5× MLB All-Star; 10× Gold Glove
- David Justice (1987–88) 3× MLB All Star; 1990 NL Rookie of the Year
- Ryan Klesko (1995) MLB All-Star
- Mark Lemke (1987–88) 11-year MLB veteran, World Series champion (1995)
- Kevin Millwood (1997, 2001) MLB All-Star; 2005 AL ERA Leader
- Terry Pendleton (1994) MLB All-Star; 1991 NL Most Valuable Player
- Anthony Rizzo (2008, 2009) 3× MLB All-Star
- Jason Schmidt (1994) 3× MLB All-Star; 2003 NL ERA Leader
- Adam Wainwright (2003) 3× MLB All-Star
