= Columbus RedStixx =

- 1991–2002; Columbus, Georgia
Team logo
Cap insignia

Minor league affiliations
- Class: Class A (1991–2002)
- League: South Atlantic League (1991–2002)

Major league affiliations
- Team: Cleveland Indians (1991–2002)

Minor league titles
- League titles: None
- First-half titles (4): 1992; 1994; 1999; 2000
- Second-half titles (3): 1995; 1996; 2002

Team data
- Name: Columbus RedStixx (1992–2002); Columbus Indians (1991)
- Colors: Red, navy, silver, white, brown, black, orange
- Mascot: FredStixx
- Ballpark: Golden Park (1991–1995, 1997–2002); Ragsdale Field (1996)

The Columbus RedStixx were a minor league baseball team in Columbus, Georgia. They were a Class A team in the South Atlantic League, and a farm team of the Cleveland Indians. They were known as the Columbus Indians for the 1991 season.

The RedStixx played home games at Golden Park, except during 1996. The team's home games were moved to Ragsdale Field on the campus of Columbus State University, while Golden Park was renovated to accommodate softball events for the 1996 Atlanta Olympics. The name "RedStixx" refers to the Red Sticks, a faction of the Muscogee tribe of the area.

== History ==
After the 1990 season, the Columbus Mudcats of the Southern League relocated to Zebulon, North Carolina, becoming the Carolina Mudcats and leaving Columbus without a team. The South Atlantic League was required to expand due to its contract with Major League Baseball, and in January of 1991 placed expansion teams in Sumter, South Carolina and Columbus.

The team was affiliated with the Cleveland Indians, and for their first season carried their nickname as well, being known as the Columbus Indians. This was purely for practical reasons - with Opening Day ten weeks from when the team was established, there was no time to create new uniforms. The next year, the team held a name-the-team contest, which overwhelmingly voted to keep the name Indians. Despite this, the team chose the new name of the Columbus RedStixx, in an attempt to create an identity separate from their parent club. The name RedStixx was derived from Red Sticks, an early 19th century faction of the Muscogee tribe from the Southeastern United States.

In 2002, the team announced their intention to move to Eastlake, Ohio following that year's regular season. The team renamed themselves the Lake County Captains. Although the Redstixx left Columbus, the South Georgia Waves arrived in town the next year.

== Venues ==
The RedStixx played at Golden Park (1991–1995, 1997–2002) and for one season (1996) at Ragsdale Field, of Columbus State University. Golden Park, opened in 1951, is still in use and is located at 100 4th Street, Columbus, Georgia 31901.

== Notable alumni ==
- C.C. Sabathia (1999) Elected Baseball Hall of Fame, 2025
- David Bell (1991)
- Russell Branyan (1995–1996)
- Einar Diaz (1993–1994)
- Ricky Gutierrez (2000, MGR)
- Maicer Izturis (1999–2000)
- Damian Jackson (1993)
- Steve Kline (1994)
- Ted Kubiak (2001, MGR)
- Albie Lopez (1992)
- Torey Lovullo (2002, manager), 2017 NL Manager of the Year
- Victor Martinez (2000) 5x MLB All-Star
- Jhonny Peralta (2000) 3x MLB All-Star
- Luke Scott (2002)
- Marco Scutaro (1996) MLB All-Star
- Richie Sexson (1994) 2x MLB All-Star
- Joel Skinner (1996, MGR)
- Eric Wedge (1998, MGR) 2007 AL Manager of the Year
- Enrique Wilson (1994)
- Jaret Wright (1995)

== Season-by-season records ==
Year	Parent club	League	Division	W–L	Win %	Place	Manager	Postseason	Attendance	Source
Columbus Indians
1991	Cleveland Indians	SAL	Southern	73–69	.514	3rd	Mike Brown	-	96,736	
Columbus RedStixx
1992	Cleveland Indians	SAL	Southern	77–62	.554	1st	Mike Brown	Lost 1st round vs. Myrtle Beach 0–2	118,238	
1993	Cleveland Indians	SAL	Southern	86–56	.606	2nd	Mike Brown	-	122,137	
1994	Cleveland Indians	SAL	Southern	87–51	.630	1st	Mike Young	Lost 1st round vs. Savannah 0–2	133,351	
1995	Cleveland Indians	SAL	Southern	80–62	.563	1st	Jeff Datz	Lost 1st round vs. Augusta 0–2	128,816	
1996	Cleveland Indians	SAL	South	79–63	.556	1st	Joel Skinner	Won 1st round vs. Augusta 2-1; Lost 2nd round vs. Savannah 0–2	45,110 (Note: The RedStixx played at Columbus State University, as their home field was in use by the 1996 Olympics.)	
1997	Cleveland Indians	SAL	South	62–76	.449	4th	Harry Spilman; Jack Mull; Boyd Coffie	-	119,646	
1998	Cleveland Indians	SAL	South	59–81	.421	4th	Eric Wedge	-	94,241	
1999	Cleveland Indians	SAL	South	70–71	.496	3rd	Brad Komminsk	-	104,153	
2000	Cleveland Indians	SAL	Southern	67–70	.489	6th	Ricky Gutiérrez	Won 1st round vs Augusta 2–1; Lost finals vs. Delmarva 0–3	113,856	
2001	Cleveland Indians	SAL	Southern	77–59	.566	1st	Ted Kubiak	-	115,569	
2002	Cleveland Indians	SAL	Southern	79–60	.568	1st	Torey Lovullo	Won 1st round vs Columbia 2–1; Lost finals vs. Hickory 2–3	52,103	
Totals				896–780	.535				1,243,956	
