= List of Pittsburgh Pirates no-hitters =

The Pittsburgh Pirates are a Major League Baseball franchise in the National League Central division, based in Pittsburgh, Pennsylvania. Also known in their early years as the "Pittsburgh Alleghanys" (1882–1890), pitchers for the Pirates have thrown 6 no-hitters in franchise history.

== No-hitter definition ==
A no-hitter is officially recognized by Major League Baseball only "when a pitcher (or pitchers) allows no hits during the entire course of a game, which consists of at least nine innings", though one or more batters "may reach base via a walk, an error, a hit by pitch, a passed ball or wild pitch on strike three, or catcher's interference". No-hitters of less than nine complete innings were previously recognized by the league as official; however, several rule alterations in 1991 changed the rule to its current form.

No perfect games, a special subcategory of no-hitter, have been thrown in Pirates history. However on May 26, 1959, Harvey Haddix threw a 12-inning perfection until the fielding error by Don Hoak ended his perfection and eventually lost his no-hit bid and a game. As defined by Major League Baseball, "in a perfect game, no batter reaches any base during the course of the game."

== History ==
Nick Maddox threw the first no-hitter in Pirates history on September 20, 1907; the most recent no-hitter was jointly thrown by Francisco Córdova and Ricardo Rincón on July 12, 1997. Two left-handed starting pitchers have thrown no-hitters in franchise history while four were by right-handers. Three no-hitters were thrown at home and three on the road. They threw one in May, one in June, one in July, one in August, and two in September. The longest interval between no-hitters was between the games pitched by Maddox and Cliff Chambers, encompassing 43 years, 7 months, and 16 days from September 20, 1907 till May 6, 1951. Conversely, the shortest interval between no-hitters was between the games pitched by Moose and Dock Ellis, encompassing merely 8 months and 23 days from September 20, 1969 till June 12, 1970. They no-hit the Los Angeles Dodgers (formerly "Brooklyn Superbas") the most, which occurred twice, which were no-hit by Maddox in 1907 and Candelaria in 1976. There is one no-hitter which the team allowed at least a run, thrown by Maddox in 1907. There is one no-hitter which had a dramatic finish: Mark Smith hit a game winning three-run home run in the bottom of the tenth inning on July 12, 1997. The most baserunners allowed in a no-hitter was by Ellis (in 1970), who allowed nine. Of the 6 no-hitters, three have been won by a score of 3–0, more common than any other results. The largest margin of victory in a no-hitter was a 3–0 wins by Cliff Chambers in 1951, Bob Moose in 1969, and a combined no-hitter by Córdova and Rincón in 1997. The smallest margin of victory was a 2–1 win by Maddox in 1907. The Pirates have the longest active complete game no-hitter drought in MLB (while the Indians have the longest active no-hitter drought overall).

== Umpires and managers ==
The umpire is an integral part of any no-hitter. The task of the umpire in a baseball game is to make any decision "which involves judgment, such as, but not limited to, whether a batted ball is fair or foul, whether a pitch is a strike or a ball, or whether a runner is safe or out... [the umpire's judgment on such matters] is final." Part of the duties of the umpire making calls at home plate includes defining the strike zone, which "is defined as that area over homeplate (sic) the upper limit of which is a horizontal line at the midpoint between the top of the shoulders and the top of the uniform pants, and the lower level is a line at the hollow beneath the kneecap." These calls define every baseball game and are therefore integral to the completion of any no-hitter. A different umpire presided over each of the Pirates' six no-hitters.

The manager is another integral part of any no-hitter. The tasks of the manager is to determine the starting rotation as well as batting order and defensive lineup every game. Managers choosing the right pitcher and right defensive lineup at a right game at a right place at a right time would contribute to a no-hitter. Five different managers have led to the Pirates' six no-hitters.

== No-hitters ==
¶	Indicates a perfect game
£	Pitcher was left-handed
*	Member of the National Baseball Hall of Fame and Museum

#	Date	Pitcher	Final score	Base- runners	Opponent	Catcher	Plate umpire	Manager	Notes	Ref
1	September 20, 1907	Nick Maddox	2–1	2	Brooklyn Superbas	Jack Boyle	Bill Klem	Fred Clarke	First no-hitter in franchise history; First Pirates no-hitter at home; First right-handed pitcher to throw a no-hitter in franchise history; Smallest margin of victory in a Pirates no-hitter; Pirates' only no-hitter while allowing a run; Tied for the latest calendar date of Pirates no-hitter	
2	May 6, 1951	Cliff Chambers^{£}	3–0	8	@ Boston Braves	Ed Fitz Gerald	Frank Dascoli	Billy Meyer	Second game of a doubleheader; First Pirates no-hitter on the road; First left-handed pitcher to throw a no-hitter in franchise history; Longest interval between Pirates no-hitters; Earliest calendar date of Pirates no-hitter	
3	September 20, 1969	Bob Moose	3–0	3	@ New York Mets	Manny Sanguillén	Augie Donatelli	Larry Shepard	Tied for the latest calendar date of Pirates no-hitter; The Mets would go on to win the 1969 World Series	
4	June 12, 1970	Dock Ellis	2–0	9	@ San Diego Padres	Jerry May	Tony Venzon	Danny Murtaugh (1)	First game of a doubleheader; Shortest interval between Pirates no-hitters; Most baserunners allowed in a Pirates no-hitter; Ellis claimed he was under the influence of LSD	
5	August 9, 1976	John Candelaria^{£}	2–0	3	Los Angeles Dodgers	Duffy Dyer	Nick Colosi	Danny Murtaugh (2)	Game was televised on ABC	
6	July 12, 1997	Francisco Córdova (9 IP); Ricardo Rincón^{£} (1 IP)	3–0 (10)	4	Houston Astros	Jason Kendall	Tom Hallion	Gene Lamont	Most recent no-hitter in franchise history; Pinch-hitter Mark Smith hit a walk-off 3-run home run with two outs in the bottom of the tenth inning to secure the no-hitter	

== See also ==
- List of Major League Baseball no-hitters
