= List of Atlanta Braves no-hitters =

The Atlanta Braves are a Major League Baseball franchise based in Atlanta. They play in the National League East division. Also known in their early years as the "Boston Red Caps" (1876–1882), "Boston Beaneaters" (1883–1906), "Boston Doves" (1907–1910), "Boston Rustlers" (1911), "Boston Bees" (1936–1940), "Boston Braves" (1912–1935, 1941–1952), and "Milwaukee Braves" (1953–1965), pitchers for the Braves have thrown 14 no-hitters in franchise history.

A no-hitter is officially recognized by Major League Baseball only "when a pitcher (or pitchers) allows no hits during the entire course of a game, which consists of at least nine innings", though one or more batters "may reach base via a walk, an error, a hit by pitch, a passed ball or wild pitch on strike three, or catcher's interference". No-hitters of less than nine complete innings were previously recognized by the league as official; however, several rule alterations in 1991 changed the rule to its current form.

A perfect game, a special subcategory of no-hitter, has yet to be thrown in Braves history. As defined by Major League Baseball, "in a perfect game, no batter reaches any base during the course of the game."

== History ==
Jack Stivetts threw the first no-hitter in Braves history on August 6, 1892; the most recent no-hitter was thrown by Kent Mercker on April 8, 1994. Two left-handed pitchers have thrown no-hitters in franchise history while eleven were by right-handers. Twelve no-hitters were thrown at home and only two on the road. They threw three in April, one in May, two in June, five in August, and three in September. The longest interval between no-hitters was between the games pitched by Tom Hughes and Jim Tobin, encompassing 27 years, 10 months, and 20 days from June 16, 1916 till April 27, 1944. Conversely, the shortest interval between no-hitters was between the games pitched by Lew Burdette and Warren Spahn, encompassing merely 29 days from August 18, 1960 till September 16, 1960.

The Braves have no-hit the Philadelphia Phillies the most, which occurred four times, which were no-hit by George Davis in 1914, Jim Wilson in 1954, Burdette in 1960, and Spahn in 1960. There is one no-hitter which the team allowed one run, thrown by Vic Willis in 1899. The most baserunners allowed in a no-hitter was by Hughes (in 1916), who allowed seven. Of the fourteen no-hitters, three have been won by a score of 1–0, 2–0, and 7–0, more common than any other results. The largest margin of victory in a no-hitter was an 11–0 win by Stivetts in 1892. The smallest margin of victory in a no-hitter was a 1–0 wins by Burdette in 1960, Spahn in 1961, and a combined no-hitter by Kent Mercker, Mark Wohlers, and Alejandro Peña in 1991.

The Braves are the only team to claim three straight no-hitters with no other teams throwing one between: the Burdette and Spahn no-hitters in 1960, followed by Spahn's second no-hitter in 1961.

== Umpire ==
The umpire is part of any no-hitter. The task of the umpire in a baseball game is to make any decision "which involves judgment, such as, but not limited to, whether a batted ball is fair or foul, whether a pitch is a strike or a ball, or whether a runner is safe or out… [the umpire's judgment on such matters] is final." Part of the duties of the umpire making calls at home plate includes defining the strike zone, which "is defined as that area over homeplate (sic) the upper limit of which is a horizontal line at the midpoint between the top of the shoulders and the top of the uniform pants, and the lower level is a line at the hollow beneath the kneecap." These calls define every baseball game and are therefore integral to the completion of any no-hitter. 12 different umpires presided over each of the franchise's 14 no-hitters.

== Manager ==
The manager is another integral part of any no-hitter. The tasks of the manager include determining the starting rotation as well as batting order and defensive lineup every game. Managers choosing the right pitcher and right defensive lineup at a right game at a right place at a right time would contribute to a no-hitter. 10 different managers, most recently Bobby Cox, have led the franchise during the team's 14 no-hitters.

== List of no-hitters in Braves history ==
¶	Indicates a perfect game
£	Pitcher was left-handed
*	Member of the National Baseball Hall of Fame and Museum

#	Date	Pitcher	Final score	Base- runners	Opponent	Catcher	Plate umpire	Manager	Notes	Ref
1	August 6, 1892	Jack Stivetts	11–0	3	@ Brooklyn Grooms	Charlie Ganzel	Tom Lynch (1)	Frank Selee (1)	First no-hitter in franchise history; First franchise's no-hitter on the road; First right-handed pitcher to throw a no-hitter in franchise history; Largest margin of victory in a franchise's no-hitter; First no-hitter as Boston Beaneaters	
2	August 7, 1899	Vic Willis*	7–1	5	Washington Senators	Marty Bergen	Tom Lynch (2)	Frank Selee (2)	Franchise's first no-hitter at home; Franchise's only no-hitter while allowing a run	
3	May 8, 1907	Big Jeff Pfeffer	6–0	2	Cincinnati Reds	Tom Needham	Bob Emslie	Fred Tenney	Last no-hitter as the Boston Beaneaters	
4	September 9, 1914	George Davis	7–0	6	Philadelphia Phillies	Hank Gowdy	Ernie Quigley	George Stallings (1)	Second game of a doubleheader; First no-hitter as the Boston Braves	
5	June 16, 1916	Tom Hughes	2–0	7	Pittsburgh Pirates	Earl Blackburn	Tom Lynch (3)	George Stallings (2)	Most base-runners allowed in a franchise's no-hitter	
6	April 27, 1944	Jim Tobin	2–0	2	Brooklyn Dodgers	Phil Masi	Bill Stewart	Bob Coleman	Longest interval between no-hitters in franchise history	
7	August 11, 1950	Vern Bickford	7–0	4	Brooklyn Dodgers	Walker Cooper	Larry Goetz	Billy Southworth	Last no-hitter as the Boston Braves	
8	June 12, 1954	Jim Wilson	2–0	2	Philadelphia Phillies	Del Crandall (1)	Babe Pinelli	Charlie Grimm	First no-hitter as the Milwaukee Braves	
9	August 18, 1960	Lew Burdette	1–0	1	Philadelphia Phillies	Del Crandall (2)	Bill Jackowski	Chuck Dressen (1)	Smallest margin of victory in a franchise's no-hitter (tie); Only baserunner was a hit by a pitch to Tony González	
10	September 16, 1960	Warren Spahn*^{£} (1)	4–0	2	Philadelphia Phillies	Del Crandall (3)	Tom Gorman	Chuck Dressen (2)	First left-handed pitcher to throw a no-hitter in franchise history; Latest calendar date of franchise's no-hitter	
11	April 28, 1961	Warren Spahn*^{£} (2)	1–0	3	San Francisco Giants	Charley Lau	Augie Donatelli	Chuck Dressen (3)	Smallest margin of victory in a franchise's no-hitter (tie); Last no-hitter as the Milwaukee Braves	
12	August 5, 1973	Phil Niekro*	9–0	5	San Diego Padres	Paul Casanova	Terry Tata	Eddie Mathews	First no-hitter as the Atlanta Braves	
13	September 11, 1991	Kent Mercker^{£} (1) (6 IP); Mark Wohlers (2 IP); Alejandro Peña (1 IP)	1–0	3	San Diego Padres	Greg Olson	Harry Wendelstedt	Bobby Cox (1)	First combined no-hitter in National League history; Smallest margin of victory in a franchise's no-hitter (tie)	
14	April 8, 1994	Kent Mercker^{£} (2)	6–0	4	@ Los Angeles Dodgers	Javy Lopez	Ed Rapuano	Bobby Cox (2)	Most recent no-hitter in franchise history; Earliest calendar date of a Braves no-hitter	

== See also ==
- List of Major League Baseball no-hitters
