= List of Major League Baseball no-hitters =

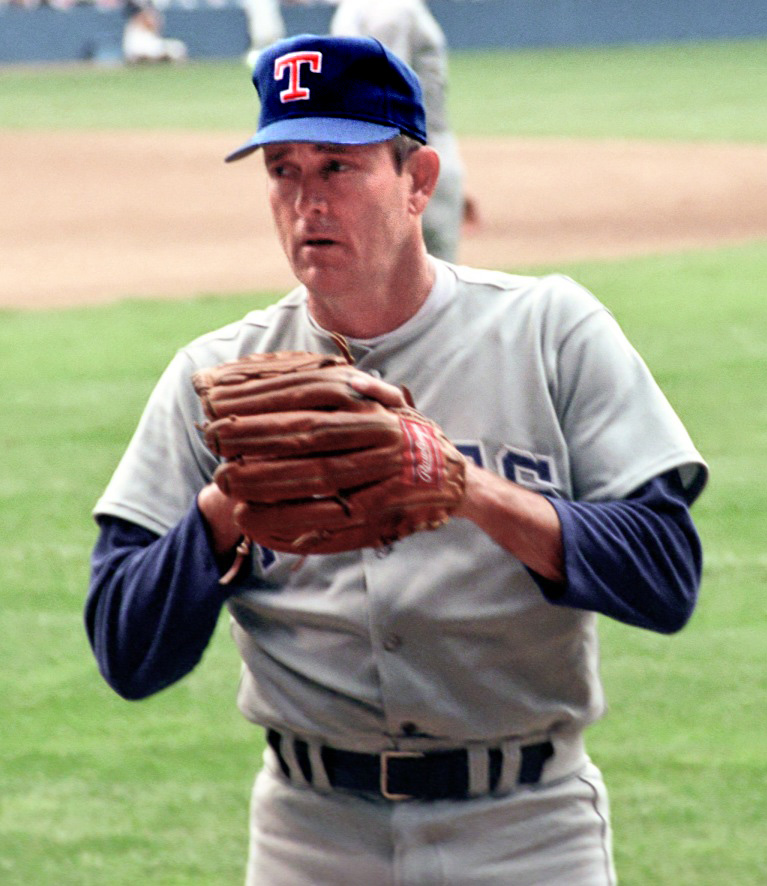
Nolan Ryan threw seven no-hitters during his major-league career, the most of any pitcher as recognized by Major League Baseball (MLB).

This list of Major League Baseball no-hitters enumerates every no-hitter in baseball history recognized by Major League Baseball (MLB). It also includes no-hit games that were broken up in extra innings or were in shortened games, although they have not been considered official no-hitters since 1991. As recognized by MLB, there have been 327 no-hitters; the most recent was thrown by Houston Astros pitchers Tatsuya Imai, Steven Okert, and Alimber Santa against the Texas Rangers on May 25, 2026.

The first no-hitter officially recognized by MLB was pitched by George Bradley on July 15, 1876, during the first season of play in the National League. Of the no-hitters recognized by MLB, 43 were thrown before the formation of the American League in 1901. The list below also includes three no-hitters that are not recognized by MLB: one in 1875 by Joe Borden that is accepted as a no-hitter in the National Association but not as a major-league game, one in 1876 by Borden in a National League game that is disputed, and one in 1901 by Pete Dowling in an American League game that is also disputed.

== Background ==
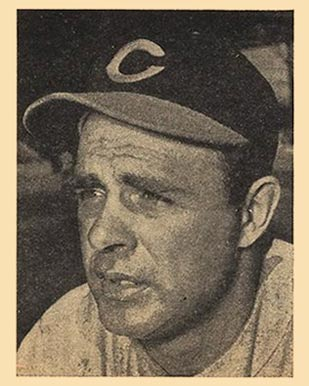
Johnny Vander Meer pitched the only consecutive no-hitters in MLB history.

An official no-hit game occurs in Major League Baseball (MLB) when a pitcher (or pitchers) allows no hits during the entire course of a game, which consists of at least nine innings thrown by the pitcher(s). By definition, a perfect game is also a no-hitter, as no batters reach base (thus there are no hits allowed). In a no-hit game, a batter may still reach base via a walk, an error, a fielder's choice, an intentional walk, a hit by pitch, a passed ball or wild pitch on strike three, or catcher's interference. Also, due to these methods of reaching base, it is possible for a team to score runs without getting any hits.

While the vast majority of no-hitters are shutouts, no-hit teams have managed to score runs in their respective games 25 times. Seven times a team has been no-hit and still won the game: two notable victories occurred when the Cincinnati Reds defeated the Houston Colt .45s (now called the Houston Astros) 1–0 on April 23, 1964, even though they were no-hit by Houston starter Ken Johnson, and the Detroit Tigers defeated the Baltimore Orioles 2–1 on April 30, 1967, even though they were no-hit by Baltimore starter Steve Barber and reliever Stu Miller. In another five games, the winning team won despite gaining no hits through eight innings (not needing to play the bottom half of the ninth inning), but these are near no-hitters under the 1991 rule that nine no-hit innings must be completed in order for a no-hitter to be credited.

Only one MLB pitcher has thrown no-hitters in consecutive starts: Johnny Vander Meer, playing for the Cincinnati Reds in 1938. Four other major leaguers have thrown two no-hitters in a single regular season: Allie Reynolds in 1951, Virgil Trucks in 1952, Nolan Ryan in 1973, and Max Scherzer in 2015. Jim Maloney technically threw two no-hitters in the 1965 season, but his first one ended after he allowed a home run in the top of the 11th inning. According to the rules interpretation of the time, this was considered a no-hitter. Later that season, Maloney once again took a no-hitter into extra innings; he preserved the no-hitter after the Reds scored in the top half of the tenth, becoming the first pitcher to throw a complete game extra inning no-hitter since Fred Toney in 1917. Roy Halladay threw two no-hitters in 2010: a perfect game during the regular season and a no-hitter in the 2010 National League Division Series. He is the only major leaguer to have thrown no-hitters in regular season and postseason play.

Ryan holds the record for most no-hitters in a career, with seven. Sandy Koufax is second on the list with four no-hitters.

The first black pitcher to toss a no-hitter was Sam Jones, who did it for the Chicago Cubs in 1955. The first Latin pitcher to throw one was San Francisco Giant Juan Marichal in 1963. The first Asian pitcher to throw one was Los Angeles Dodger Hideo Nomo in 1996.

The most recent MLB season completed without a no-hitter was 2025. (Note: Major League Baseball seasons since 1901 without a no-hitter pitched are 1909, 1913, 1921, 1927–1928, 1932–1933, 1936, 1939, 1942–1943, 1949, 1959, 1982, 1985, 1989, 2000, 2005 and 2025.)

== Regulation no-hitters ==
The names of pitchers who threw a perfect game are italicized. For combined no-hitters by two or more pitchers on the same team, each is listed with his number of innings pitched. Games that were part of a doubleheader are noted as either the first game or second game.

=== Key ===
Key
Italics	Perfect game
N/A	Not Applicable
RS	Runs scored
RA	Runs allowed
IP	Innings pitched
†	Elected to the Baseball Hall of Fame
‡	Denotes player who is still active
^	Team who threw no-hitter lost the game
§	Indicates game pitched in the postseason

Leagues
NL	National League
AL	American League
FL	Federal League
PL	Players' League
UA	Union Association
AA	American Association
NA	National Association
WS	World Series
Inter	Interleague play

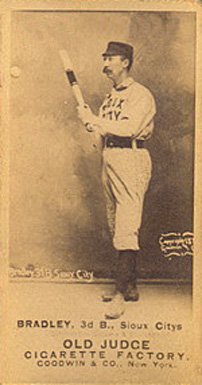
George Bradley, credited with the first official MLB no-hitter

=== No-hitters ===
No-hitters
#	Date	Pitcher	Team	RS	Opponent	RA	Lg.	Catcher	Notes
—N/a	July 28, 1875	Joe Borden	Philadelphia White Stockings	4	Chicago White Stockings	0	NA	Pop Snyder	(Note: Major League Baseball does not recognize the National Association as a major league.)
—N/a	May 23, 1876	Joe Borden	Boston Red Caps	8	Cincinnati Reds	0	NL	John Morrill	(Note: Some baseball historians claim this was the first no-hitter in National League history, but contemporary newspaper reports differ; see Joe Borden#1876 season.)
1	July 15, 1876	George Bradley	St. Louis Brown Stockings	2	Hartford Dark Blues	0	NL	John Clapp	
2	June 12, 1880	Lee Richmond	Worcester Worcesters	1	Cleveland Blues	0	NL	Charlie Bennett	
3	June 17, 1880	John Montgomery Ward ^{†}	Providence Grays	5	Buffalo Bisons	0	NL	Emil Gross	
4	August 19, 1880	Larry Corcoran (1)	Chicago White Stockings	6	Boston Red Caps	0	NL	Silver Flint (? IP) (1); King Kelly (? IP) (1)^{†}	
5	August 20, 1880	Pud Galvin (1)^{†}	Buffalo Bisons	1	Worcester Worcesters	0	NL	Jack Rowe (1)	
6	September 11, 1882	Tony Mullane	Louisville Eclipse	2	Cincinnati Red Stockings	0	AA	Dan Sullivan (1)	
7	September 19, 1882	Guy Hecker	Louisville Eclipse	3	Pittsburgh Alleghenys	1	AA	Dan Sullivan (2)	
8	September 20, 1882	Larry Corcoran (2)	Chicago White Stockings	5	Worcester Worcesters	0	NL	Silver Flint (2)	
9	July 25, 1883	Charles Radbourn^{†}	Providence Grays	8	Cleveland Blues	0	NL	Barney Gilligan	
10	September 13, 1883	Hugh Daily	Cleveland Blues	1	Philadelphia Quakers	0	NL	Doc Bushong	
11	May 24, 1884	Al Atkinson (1)	Philadelphia Athletics	10	Pittsburgh Alleghenys	1	AA	Jocko Milligan	
12	May 29, 1884	Ed Morris	Columbus Buckeyes	5	Pittsburgh Alleghenys	0	AA	Rudy Kemmler (1)	
13	June 5, 1884	Frank Mountain	Columbus Buckeyes	12	Washington Nationals	0	AA	Rudy Kemmler (2)	
14	June 27, 1884	Larry Corcoran (3)	Chicago White Stockings	6	Providence Grays	0	NL	King Kelly (2)^{†}	
15	August 4, 1884	Pud Galvin (2)^{†}	Buffalo Bisons	18	Detroit Wolverines	0	NL	Jack Rowe (2)	
16	August 26, 1884	Dick Burns	Cincinnati Outlaw Reds	3	Kansas City Cowboys	1	UA	Joe Crotty	
17	September 28, 1884	Ed Cushman	Milwaukee Brewers	5	Washington Nationals	0	UA	Cal Broughton	
18	October 4, 1884	Sam Kimber	Brooklyn Atlantics	0	Toledo Blue Stockings	0	AA	Jack Corcoran	(Note: 10 inning tie. First extra inning no-hitter and first that did not result in a win for the pitching team. Only no-hitter to result in a tie.)
19	July 27, 1885	John Clarkson ^{†}	Chicago White Stockings	4	Providence Grays	0	NL	Silver Flint (3)	
20	August 29, 1885	Charlie Ferguson	Philadelphia Quakers	1	Providence Grays	0	NL	Charlie Ganzel (1)	
21	May 1, 1886	Al Atkinson (2)	Philadelphia Athletics	3	New York Metropolitans	2	AA	Jack O'Brien	
22	July 24, 1886	Adonis Terry (1)	Brooklyn Grays	1	St. Louis Browns	0	AA	Jimmy Peoples (1)	
23	October 6, 1886	Matt Kilroy	Baltimore Orioles	6	Pittsburgh Alleghenys	0	AA	Tom Dolan	
24	May 27, 1888	Adonis Terry (2)	Brooklyn Bridegrooms	4	Louisville Colonels	0	AA	Jimmy Peoples (2)	
25	June 6, 1888	Henry Porter	Kansas City Cowboys	4	Baltimore Orioles	0	AA	Law Daniels	
26	July 26, 1888	Ed Seward	Philadelphia Athletics	12	Cincinnati Red Stockings	2	AA	Wilbert Robinson (1)^{†}	
27	July 31, 1888	Gus Weyhing	Philadelphia Athletics	4	Kansas City Cowboys	0	AA	George Townsend	
28	September 15, 1890	Ledell Titcomb	Rochester Broncos	7	Syracuse Stars	0	AA	John Grim	
29	June 22, 1891	Tom Lovett	Brooklyn Grooms	4	New York Giants	0	NL	Con Daily	
30	July 31, 1891	Amos Rusie ^{†}	New York Giants	6	Brooklyn Grooms	0	NL	Dick Buckley	(Note: At 20 years and two months old, Rusie is the youngest pitcher to throw a no-hitter.)
31	October 4, 1891	Ted Breitenstein (1)	St. Louis Browns	8	Louisville Colonels	0	AA	John Munyan	(Note: First career start. First game of a doubleheader on the final day of the season.)
32	August 6, 1892	Jack Stivetts	Boston Beaneaters	11	Brooklyn Grooms	0	NL	Charlie Ganzel (2)	
33	August 22, 1892	Ben Sanders	Louisville Colonels	6	Baltimore Orioles	2	NL	Bill Merritt	
34	October 15, 1892	Bumpus Jones	Cincinnati Reds	7	Pittsburgh Pirates	1	NL	Farmer Vaughn	(Note: First career game.)
35	August 16, 1893	Bill Hawke	Baltimore Orioles	5	Washington Senators	0	NL	Wilbert Robinson (2)^{†}	(Note: First no-hitter at modern pitching distance of 60'6".)
36	September 18, 1897	Cy Young (1)^{†}	Cleveland Spiders	6	Cincinnati Reds	0	NL	Chief Zimmer (1)	(Note: First game of a doubleheader.)
37	April 22, 1898	Ted Breitenstein (2)	Cincinnati Reds	11	Pittsburgh Pirates	0	NL	Heinie Peitz (1)	(Note: First of two no-hitters on the same day.)
38	April 22, 1898	Jay Hughes	Baltimore Orioles	8	Boston Beaneaters	0	NL	Boileryard Clarke	(Note: Second of two no-hitters on the same day.)
39	July 8, 1898	Red Donahue	Philadelphia Phillies	5	Boston Beaneaters	0	NL	Ed McFarland (1)	
40	August 21, 1898	Walter Thornton	Chicago Orphans	2	Brooklyn Bridegrooms	0	NL	Tim Donahue	(Note: Second game of a doubleheader.)
41	May 25, 1899	Deacon Phillippe	Louisville Colonels	7	New York Giants	0	NL	Malachi Kittridge	
42	August 7, 1899	Vic Willis ^{†}	Boston Beaneaters	7	Washington Senators	1	NL	Marty Bergen	
43	July 12, 1900	Noodles Hahn	Cincinnati Reds	4	Philadelphia Phillies	0	NL	Heinie Peitz (2)	
—N/a	June 30, 1901	Pete Dowling	Cleveland Blues	7	Milwaukee Brewers	0	AL	George Yeager	(Note: Not officially recognized by Major League Baseball for unknown reasons. There is some discrepancy over whether this was a no-hitter. Baseball Reference and Retrosheet both credit Dowling with giving up no hits. Newspaper accounts, however, state that Milwaukee's Wid Conroy reached on an infield single in the 7th. Conroy's career statistics, though, do not credit him with a hit in this game.)
44	July 15, 1901	Christy Mathewson (1)^{†}	New York Giants	5	St. Louis Cardinals	0	NL	Jack Warner	
45	September 20, 1902	Nixey Callahan	Chicago White Stockings	3	Detroit Tigers	0	AL	Ed McFarland (2)	
46	September 18, 1903	Chick Fraser	Philadelphia Phillies	10	Chicago Cubs	0	NL	Chief Zimmer (2)	
47	May 5, 1904	Cy Young (2)^{†}	Boston Americans	3	Philadelphia Athletics	0	AL	Lou Criger (1)	(Note: Part of a streak of 25.1 consecutive hitless innings by Young, still a Major League record.)
48	August 17, 1904	Jesse Tannehill	Boston Americans	6	Chicago White Sox	0	AL	Duke Farrell	(Note: Tannehill's brother, Lee, played third base for the White Sox and went 0–3.)
49	June 13, 1905	Christy Mathewson (2)^{†}	New York Giants	1	Chicago Cubs	0	NL	Frank Bowerman	(Note: Only base-runners came on errors by Bill Dahlen and Billy Gilbert.)
50	July 22, 1905	Weldon Henley	Philadelphia Athletics	6	St. Louis Browns	0	AL	Harry Barton	
51	September 6, 1905	Frank Smith (1)	Chicago White Sox	15	Detroit Tigers	0	AL	Ed McFarland (3)	(Note: Second game of a doubleheader. The Tigers lineup included 18-year-old Ty Cobb, who was playing in his 10th career game and went 0–2 with a walk.)
52	September 27, 1905	Bill Dinneen	Boston Americans	2	Chicago White Sox	0	AL	Lou Criger (2)	(Note: First game of a doubleheader. Dinneen would later be the home plate umpire for five no-hitters.)
53	May 1, 1906	Johnny Lush	Philadelphia Phillies	6	Brooklyn Superbas	0	NL	Red Dooin	(Note: The Phillies would not have another no-hitter until Jim Bunning's perfect game in 1964.)
54	July 20, 1906	Mal Eason	Brooklyn Superbas	2	St. Louis Cardinals	0	NL	Lew Ritter	(Note: Eason was the losing pitcher in the previous no-hitter, a feat not duplicated until 1947. He would be the home plate umpire for Davis' no-hitter in 1914. Remains the last time the Cardinals have been no-hit at home.)
55	May 8, 1907	Big Jeff Pfeffer	Boston Doves	6	Cincinnati Reds	0	NL	Sam Brown	
56	September 20, 1907	Nick Maddox	Pittsburgh Pirates	2	Brooklyn Superbas	1	NL	George Gibson	(Note: Third career start for Maddox. Last no-hitter in Pittsburgh until 1971. A Pirate pitcher would not throw a no-hitter at home again until 1976.)
57	June 30, 1908	Cy Young (3)^{†}	Boston Red Sox	8	New York Highlanders	0	AL	Lou Criger (3)	(Note: Young retired the final 27 batters in a row after a leadoff walk. He also drove in four runs.)
58	July 4, 1908	Hooks Wiltse	New York Giants	1	Philadelphia Phillies	0	NL	Roger Bresnahan ^{†}	(Note: First game of a doubleheader. 10 innings, only base-runner was on a Hit by pitch with 2 outs in the ninth.)
59	September 5, 1908	Nap Rucker	Brooklyn Superbas	6	Boston Doves	0	NL	Bill Bergen	
60	September 18, 1908	Bob Rhoads	Cleveland Naps	2	Boston Red Sox	1	AL	Harry Bemis	
61	September 20, 1908	Frank Smith (2)	Chicago White Sox	1	Philadelphia Athletics	0	AL	Billy Sullivan	
62	October 2, 1908	Addie Joss (1)^{†}	Cleveland Naps	1	Chicago White Sox	0	AL	Nig Clarke (1)	
63	April 20, 1910	Addie Joss (2)^{†}	Cleveland Naps	1	Chicago White Sox	0	AL	Nig Clarke (2)	(Note: To date, Joss is one of only three pitchers in modern history to no-hit the same team twice.)
64	May 12, 1910	Chief Bender ^{†}	Philadelphia Athletics	4	Cleveland Naps	0	AL	Ira Thomas	
65	July 29, 1911	Smoky Joe Wood	Boston Red Sox	5	St. Louis Browns	0	AL	Bill Carrigan(1)	(Note: First game of a doubleheader. Wood had a no-hitter broken up in the 9th inning against the Browns three weeks earlier.)
66	August 27, 1911	Ed Walsh ^{†}	Chicago White Sox	5	Boston Red Sox	0	AL	Bruno Block	
67	July 4, 1912	George Mullin	Detroit Tigers	7	St. Louis Browns	0	AL	Oscar Stanage	
68	August 30, 1912	Earl Hamilton	St. Louis Browns	5	Detroit Tigers	1	AL	Walt Alexander	(Note: Hamilton did not strike out a batter.)
69	September 6, 1912	Jeff Tesreau	New York Giants	3	Philadelphia Phillies	0	NL	Art Wilson (1)	
70	May 31, 1914	Joe Benz	Chicago White Sox	6	Cleveland Naps	1	AL	Ray Schalk (1)^{†}	(Note: Benz took a no-hitter into the 9th inning two starts later.)
71	September 9, 1914	Iron Davis	Boston Braves	7	Philadelphia Phillies	0	NL	Hank Gowdy	(Note: Second game of a doubleheader. First no-hitter at Fenway Park.)
72	September 19, 1914	Ed Lafitte	Brooklyn Tip-Tops	6	Kansas City Packers	2	FL	Yip Owens	
73	April 15, 1915	Rube Marquard ^{†}	New York Giants	2	Brooklyn Robins	0	NL	Chief Meyers	
74	April 24, 1915	Frank Allen	Pittsburgh Rebels	2	St. Louis Terriers	0	FL	Claude Berry	
75	May 15, 1915	Claude Hendrix	Chicago Whales	10	Pittsburgh Rebels	0	FL	Art Wilson (2)	
76	August 16, 1915	Alex Main	Kansas City Packers	5	Buffalo Blues	0	FL	Ted Easterly	
77	August 31, 1915	Jimmy Lavender	Chicago Cubs	2	New York Giants	0	NL	Jimmy Archer	
78	September 7, 1915	Dave Davenport	St. Louis Terriers	3	Chicago Whales	0	FL	Grover Hartley	
79	June 16, 1916	Tom L. Hughes	Boston Braves	2	Pittsburgh Pirates	0	NL	Walt Tragesser	
80	June 21, 1916	Rube Foster	Boston Red Sox	2	New York Yankees	0	AL	Bill Carrigan (2)	
81	August 26, 1916	Bullet Joe Bush	Philadelphia Athletics	5	Cleveland Indians	0	AL	Val Picinich (1)	(Note: Bush retired 27 batters in a row after a leadoff walk in the first inning. He also started against Cleveland a day earlier and gave up five runs in just three innings. The Athletics went 36–117, making them the worst team to pitch a no-hitter. This was the final game in the career of future Hall of Famer Nap Lajoie.)
82	August 30, 1916	Dutch Leonard (1)	Boston Red Sox	4	St. Louis Browns	0	AL	Bill Carrigan (3)	
83	April 14, 1917	Eddie Cicotte	Chicago White Sox	11	St. Louis Browns	0	AL	Ray Schalk (2)^{†}	
84	April 24, 1917	George Mogridge	New York Yankees	2	Boston Red Sox	1	AL	Les Nunamaker	
85	May 2, 1917	Fred Toney	Cincinnati Reds	1	Chicago Cubs	0	NL	Emil Huhn	(Note: 10 innings; See Double No-Hitter)
86	May 5, 1917	Ernie Koob	St. Louis Browns	1	Chicago White Sox	0	AL	Hank Severeid (1)	
87	May 6, 1917	Bob Groom	St. Louis Browns	3	Chicago White Sox	0	AL	Hank Severeid (2)	(Note: The same teams, in the same park, on the next day as the previous no-hitter, but the second game of a doubleheader. Groom also pitched two hitless innings in relief during the first game. The White Sox went on to win the 1917 World Series—to date, the only time a team won a World Series after being no-hit twice in the same season.)
88	June 23, 1917	Babe Ruth (0 IP) ^{†} Ernie Shore (9 IP)	Boston Red Sox	4	Washington Senators	0	AL	Pinch Thomas (0 IP); Sam Agnew (9 IP)	(Note: First game of a doubleheader. Ruth and Thomas were ejected for arguing balls and strikes after walking the first batter, who was then caught stealing. Shore retired the next 26 in a row for a no-hitter completely in relief.)
89	June 3, 1918	Dutch Leonard (2)	Boston Red Sox	5	Detroit Tigers	0	AL	Wally Schang	
90	May 11, 1919	Hod Eller	Cincinnati Reds	6	St. Louis Cardinals	0	NL	Bill Rariden	
91	September 10, 1919	Ray Caldwell	Cleveland Indians	3	New York Yankees	0	AL	Steve O'Neill	(Note: First game of a doubleheader. Two weeks earlier, Caldwell had been struck by lightning while on the mound during a game against the Athletics.)
92	July 1, 1920	Walter Johnson ^{†}	Washington Senators	1	Boston Red Sox	0	AL	Val Picinich (2)	(Note: Only base-runner came on Bucky Harris' error leading off the 7th.)
93	April 30, 1922	Charlie Robertson	Chicago White Sox	2	Detroit Tigers	0	AL	Ray Schalk (3)^{†}	
94	May 7, 1922	Jesse Barnes	New York Giants	6	Philadelphia Phillies	0	NL	Earl Smith	
95	September 4, 1923	Sad Sam Jones	New York Yankees	2	Philadelphia Athletics	0	AL	Fred Hofmann	(Note: Jones did not strike out a batter the entire game.)
96	September 7, 1923	Howard Ehmke	Boston Red Sox	4	Philadelphia Athletics	0	AL	Val Picinich (3)	(Note: In the sixth inning, Athletics pitcher Slim Harriss hit a ball to left field but was tagged out after not touching first base. Two innings later, Frank Welch was credited with a hit that was later changed to an error on Red Sox left fielder Mike Menosky. Ehmke pitched a one-hit shutout in his next start four days later, the only hit coming on the first batter of the game when Howie Shanks misplayed a ground ball that was ruled a hit instead of an error.)
97	July 17, 1924	Jesse Haines ^{†}	St. Louis Cardinals	5	Boston Braves	0	NL	Mike González	(Note: Only no-hitter the Cardinals would have at Sportsman's Park, their home from 1920 to 1966.)
98	September 13, 1925	Dazzy Vance ^{†}	Brooklyn Robins	10	Philadelphia Phillies	1	NL	Hank DeBerry	(Note: First game of a doubleheader. Vance had thrown a one-hit shutout against the Phillies five days earlier.)
99	August 21, 1926	Ted Lyons ^{†}	Chicago White Sox	6	Boston Red Sox	0	AL	Johnny Grabowski	
100	May 8, 1929	Carl Hubbell ^{†}	New York Giants	11	Pittsburgh Pirates	0	NL	Bob O'Farrell	
101	April 29, 1931	Wes Ferrell	Cleveland Indians	9	St. Louis Browns	0	AL	Luke Sewell (1)	(Note: Also hit a home run. Ferrell's brother, Rick, started at catcher for the Browns and went 0–3.)
102	August 8, 1931	Bobby Burke	Washington Senators	5	Boston Red Sox	0	AL	Roy Spencer	(Note: Only no-hitter ever thrown at Griffith Stadium, home of the Senators from 1911 to 1960.)
103	September 21, 1934	Paul Dean	St. Louis Cardinals	3	Brooklyn Dodgers	0	NL	Bill DeLancey	(Note: Second game of a doubleheader. In the first game, Paul's brother Dizzy had a no-hitter for 8 innings but finished with a 3-hit shutout. First no-hitter in 1140 days, the longest gap between no-hitters in the modern era as measured by days.)
104	August 31, 1935	Vern Kennedy	Chicago White Sox	5	Cleveland Indians	0	AL	Luke Sewell (2)	(Note: First no-hitter ever thrown at Comiskey Park.)
105	June 1, 1937	Bill Dietrich	Chicago White Sox	8	St. Louis Browns	0	AL	Luke Sewell (3)	
106	June 11, 1938	Johnny Vander Meer (1)	Cincinnati Reds	3	Boston Bees	0	NL	Ernie Lombardi (1)^{†}	(Note: First of two no-hitters in back-to-back starts.)
107	June 15, 1938	Johnny Vander Meer (2)	Cincinnati Reds	6	Brooklyn Dodgers	0	NL	Ernie Lombardi (2)^{†}	(Note: Second of two no-hitters in back-to-back starts. First-ever night game at Ebbets Field)
108	August 27, 1938	Monte Pearson	New York Yankees	13	Cleveland Indians	0	AL	Joe Glenn	(Note: Second game of a doubleheader. First no-hitter at Yankee Stadium.)
109	April 16, 1940	Bob Feller (1) ^{†}	Cleveland Indians	1	Chicago White Sox	0	AL	Rollie Hemsley	(Note: Opening Day)
110	April 30, 1940	Tex Carleton	Brooklyn Dodgers	3	Cincinnati Reds	0	NL	Herman Franks	
111	August 30, 1941	Lon Warneke	St. Louis Cardinals	2	Cincinnati Reds	0	NL	Walker Cooper (1)	
112	April 27, 1944	Jim Tobin	Boston Braves	2	Brooklyn Dodgers	0	NL	Phil Masi	(Note: Tobin pitched a one-hit shutout in his previous start. He would be the losing pitcher in Shoun's no-hitter eighteen days later.)
113	May 15, 1944	Clyde Shoun	Cincinnati Reds	1	Boston Braves	0	NL	Ray Mueller	(Note: Only base-runner was a walk to the opposing pitcher in the third inning. A day earlier, Shoun's teammate Bucky Walters had a no-hitter broken up with two outs in the eighth inning.)
114	September 9, 1945	Dick Fowler	Philadelphia Athletics	1	St. Louis Browns	0	AL	Buddy Rosar (1)	(Note: Second game of a doubleheader. First no-hitter by a Canadian-born pitcher. The winning run was scored in the bottom of the ninth inning. Fowler was making his first start in nearly three years after serving in World War II. This was his only victory of the season.)
115	April 23, 1946	Ed Head	Brooklyn Dodgers	5	Boston Braves	0	NL	Ferrell Anderson	
116	April 30, 1946	Bob Feller (2)^{†}	Cleveland Indians	1	New York Yankees	0	AL	Frankie Hayes	
117	June 18, 1947	Ewell Blackwell	Cincinnati Reds	6	Boston Braves	0	NL	Ray Lamanno	(Note: Against the Brooklyn Dodgers four days later, Blackwell nearly duplicated Vander Meer's double no-hit feat but had this bid broken up in the ninth.)
118	July 10, 1947	Don Black	Cleveland Indians	3	Philadelphia Athletics	0	AL	Jim Hegan (1)	
119	September 3, 1947	Bill McCahan	Philadelphia Athletics	3	Washington Senators	0	AL	Buddy Rosar (2)	(Note: Only base-runner came on Ferris Fain's error with one out in the 2nd. McCahan had been the losing pitcher in Black's no-hitter earlier in the season.)
120	June 30, 1948	Bob Lemon ^{†}	Cleveland Indians	2	Detroit Tigers	0	AL	Jim Hegan (2)	
121	September 9, 1948	Rex Barney	Brooklyn Dodgers	2	New York Giants	0	NL	Bruce Edwards	
122	August 11, 1950	Vern Bickford	Boston Braves	7	Brooklyn Dodgers	0	NL	Walker Cooper (2)	
123	May 6, 1951	Cliff Chambers	Pittsburgh Pirates	3	Boston Braves	0	NL	Ed Fitz Gerald	
124	July 1, 1951	Bob Feller (3)^{†}	Cleveland Indians	2	Detroit Tigers	1	AL	Jim Hegan (3)	
125	July 12, 1951	Allie Reynolds (1)	New York Yankees	1	Cleveland Indians	0	AL	Yogi Berra (1)^{†}	
126	September 28, 1951	Allie Reynolds (2)	New York Yankees	8	Boston Red Sox	0	AL	Yogi Berra (2)^{†}	(Note: First game of a doubleheader. The win gave the Yankees a share of the 1951 pennant, which they clinched outright in the second game.)
127	May 15, 1952	Virgil Trucks (1)	Detroit Tigers	1	Washington Senators	0	AL	Joe Ginsberg	(Note: Tigers won on a walk-off home run in the bottom of the ninth inning.)
128	June 19, 1952	Carl Erskine (1)	Brooklyn Dodgers	5	Chicago Cubs	0	NL	Roy Campanella (1)^{†}	
129	August 25, 1952	Virgil Trucks (2)	Detroit Tigers	1	New York Yankees	0	AL	Matt Batts	(Note: Trucks pitched two no-hitters in 1952 but went 5–19. Yankees' shortstop Phil Rizzuto was initially credited with a hit in the third inning but it was later changed to an error on Tigers' shortstop Johnny Pesky.)
130	May 6, 1953	Bobo Holloman	St. Louis Browns	6	Philadelphia Athletics	0	AL	Les Moss	(Note: First major league start; Holloman would win only two more Major League games.)
131	June 12, 1954	Jim Wilson	Milwaukee Braves	2	Philadelphia Phillies	0	NL	Del Crandall (1)	
132	May 12, 1955	Sam Jones	Chicago Cubs	4	Pittsburgh Pirates	0	NL	Clyde McCullough	(Note: First no-hitter by black pitcher. Jones walked the bases loaded with no one out in the ninth inning but then struck out the final three batters to end the game.)
133	May 12, 1956	Carl Erskine (2)	Brooklyn Dodgers	3	New York Giants	0	NL	Roy Campanella (2)^{†}	
134	July 14, 1956	Mel Parnell	Boston Red Sox	4	Chicago White Sox	0	AL	Sammy White	
135	September 25, 1956	Sal Maglie	Brooklyn Dodgers	5	Philadelphia Phillies	0	NL	Roy Campanella (3)^{†}	(Note: Maglie would be the losing pitcher in Larsen's perfect game 13 days later.)
136	October 8, 1956 §	Don Larsen	New York Yankees (AL)	2	Brooklyn Dodgers (NL)	0	WS	Yogi Berra (3)^{†}	(Note: Game 5 of the 1956 World Series; the first of three postseason no-hitters. First perfect game in the majors since 1922. Game was televised by NBC.)
137	August 20, 1957	Bob Keegan	Chicago White Sox	6	Washington Senators	0	AL	Sherm Lollar	
138	July 20, 1958	Jim Bunning (1)^{†}	Detroit Tigers	3	Boston Red Sox	0	AL	Red Wilson	
139	September 20, 1958	Hoyt Wilhelm ^{†}	Baltimore Orioles	1	New York Yankees	0	AL	Gus Triandos (1)	(Note: Wilhelm had pitched primarily in relief prior to this season; this was only his ninth career start. The Yankees would go on to win the World Series, and wouldn't be no-hit again until 2003.)
140	May 15, 1960	Don Cardwell	Chicago Cubs	4	St. Louis Cardinals	0	NL	Del Rice	(Note: Second game of a doubleheader. First start after being traded by Phillies to Cubs. Cardwell retired the last 26 batters he faced after a first inning walk. First no-hitter against the Cardinals in 41 years.)
141	August 18, 1960	Lew Burdette	Milwaukee Braves	1	Philadelphia Phillies	0	NL	Del Crandall (2)	(Note: Burdette scored the game's only run. He faced the minimum and didn't issue a walk. The only base-runner came on a hit by pitch in the fifth inning, who was then retired on a double play.)
142	September 16, 1960	Warren Spahn (1)^{†}	Milwaukee Braves	4	Philadelphia Phillies	0	NL	Del Crandall (3)	(Note: Spahn's first no-hitter came in his 506th career start, the most in Major League history. He would pitch his second just six starts later. First time since 1917 a team no-hit the same opponent twice in a season, a feat that hasn't happened since.)
143	April 28, 1961	Warren Spahn (2)^{†}	Milwaukee Braves	1	San Francisco Giants	0	NL	Charley Lau	(Note: Faced the minimum 27 batters, with the only two base-runners being retired on double plays. Spahn's second no-hitter in a span of six starts.)
144	May 5, 1962	Bo Belinsky	Los Angeles Angels	2	Baltimore Orioles	0	AL	Buck Rodgers	(Note: Belinsky's fourth career game. First no-hitter at Dodger Stadium. Belinsky's gem was also the first in Los Angeles Angels of Anaheim history, and the first since major league baseball came to California with the Giants and Dodgers in 1958.)
145	June 26, 1962	Earl Wilson	Boston Red Sox	2	Los Angeles Angels	0	AL	Bob Tillman (1)	(Note: Wilson also hit a home run.)
146	June 30, 1962	Sandy Koufax (1)^{†}	Los Angeles Dodgers	5	New York Mets	0	NL	John Roseboro (1)	(Note: First no-hitter by a Dodgers pitcher at Dodger Stadium (see Bo Belinsky's entry above) and the first in team history since the move from Brooklyn in 1958.)
147	August 1, 1962	Bill Monbouquette	Boston Red Sox	1	Chicago White Sox	0	AL	Jim Pagliaroni (1)	
148	August 26, 1962	Jack Kralick	Minnesota Twins	1	Kansas City Athletics	0	AL	Earl Battey	(Note: Only base-runner was a walk in the 9th.)
149	May 11, 1963	Sandy Koufax (2)^{†}	Los Angeles Dodgers	8	San Francisco Giants	0	NL	John Roseboro (2)	(Note: Koufax retired Harvey Kuenn for the final out. Kuenn would also be the last out in Koufax's perfect game two years later.)
150	May 17, 1963	Don Nottebart	Houston Colt .45s	4	Philadelphia Phillies	1	NL	John Bateman (1)	
151	June 15, 1963	Juan Marichal ^{†}	San Francisco Giants	1	Houston Colt .45s	0	NL	Ed Bailey	(Note: Marichal was the losing pitcher in Koufax's no-hitter earlier in the season.)
152	April 23, 1964	Ken Johnson	Houston Colt .45s	0^	Cincinnati Reds	1	NL	Jerry Grote	(Note: 9-inning home loss. Only run scored on an error with two outs in the ninth inning.)
153	June 4, 1964	Sandy Koufax (3)^{†}	Los Angeles Dodgers	3	Philadelphia Phillies	0	NL	Doug Camilli	(Note: Koufax faced the minimum 27 batters (the only base-runner was caught stealing).)
154	June 21, 1964	Jim Bunning (2)^{†}	Philadelphia Phillies	6	New York Mets	0	NL	Gus Triandos (2)	(Note: Father's Day. First game of a doubleheader.)
155	August 19, 1965	Jim Maloney (1)	Cincinnati Reds	1	Chicago Cubs	0	NL	Johnny Edwards (1)	(Note: 10 innings. Maloney threw 187 pitches, walked 10 and hit a batter. Two months earlier, Maloney also had a no-hitter thru 10 innings before it was broken up in the 11th.)
156	September 9, 1965	Sandy Koufax (4)^{†}	Los Angeles Dodgers	1	Chicago Cubs	0	NL	Jeff Torborg (1)	(Note: Dodgers only managed 2 base-runners and one hit, setting records for fewest base-runners and hits in a game by both teams combined. The last no-hitter thrown against the Cubs until July 25, 2015. As of 2011, first of only two perfect games at Dodger Stadium – the other was pitched by Dennis Martínez in 1991.)
157	September 16, 1965	Dave Morehead	Boston Red Sox	2	Cleveland Indians	0	AL	Bob Tillman (2)	(Note: On the same day, the Red Sox fired Pinky Higgins as their general manager. At 1,247 this was the lowest attended no-hitter until Lucas Giolito pitched one on August 25, 2020 with no fans in attendance due to the COVID-19 pandemic.)
158	June 10, 1966	Sonny Siebert	Cleveland Indians	2	Washington Senators	0	AL	Joe Azcue (1)	
159	April 30, 1967	Steve Barber (8⅔ IP) Stu Miller (⅓ IP)	Baltimore Orioles	1^	Detroit Tigers	2	AL	Andy Etchebarren (8 IP); Larry Haney (1 IP)	(Note: First game of a doubleheader. 9-inning home loss. Tigers had at least one base-runner in every inning except one. Barber walked 10, hit two batters and committed an error.)
160	June 18, 1967	Don Wilson (1)	Houston Astros	2	Atlanta Braves	0	NL	Dave Adlesh	(Note: First no-hitter on artificial turf and in a domed stadium.)
161	August 25, 1967	Dean Chance	Minnesota Twins	2	Cleveland Indians	1	AL	Jerry Zimmerman	
162	September 10, 1967	Joel Horlen	Chicago White Sox	6	Detroit Tigers	0	AL	J. C. Martin	(Note: First game of a doubleheader. Horlen didn't walk a batter, the only two basrunners coming on a hit by pitch and an error.)
163	April 27, 1968	Tom Phoebus	Baltimore Orioles	6	Boston Red Sox	0	AL	Curt Blefary	
164	May 8, 1968	Catfish Hunter ^{†}	Oakland Athletics	4	Minnesota Twins	0	AL	Jim Pagliaroni (2)	(Note: Hunter also batted in three of Oakland's four runs.)
165	July 29, 1968	George Culver	Cincinnati Reds	6	Philadelphia Phillies	1	NL	Pat Corrales	
166	September 17, 1968	Gaylord Perry ^{†}	San Francisco Giants	1	St. Louis Cardinals	0	NL	Dick Dietz	(Note: The next day in the same park, the Cardinals no-hit the Giants.)
167	September 18, 1968	Ray Washburn	St. Louis Cardinals	2	San Francisco Giants	0	NL	Johnny Edwards (2)	(Note: The previous day in the same park, the Giants no-hit the Cardinals.)
168	April 17, 1969	Bill Stoneman (1)	Montreal Expos	7	Philadelphia Phillies	0	NL	John Bateman (2)	(Note: Stoneman's fifth career start; ninth game in Expos franchise history. Sets a record for the earliest no-hitter recorded in a franchise's history.)
169	April 30, 1969	Jim Maloney (2)	Cincinnati Reds	10	Houston Astros	0	NL	Johnny Bench ^{†}	(Note: First game of a two-game series, in which both were no-hitters.)
170	May 1, 1969	Don Wilson (2)	Houston Astros	4	Cincinnati Reds	0	NL	Don Bryant	(Note: Second game of a two-game series, in which both were no-hitters.)
171	August 13, 1969	Jim Palmer ^{†}	Baltimore Orioles	8	Oakland Athletics	0	AL	Ellie Hendricks	(Note: Palmer came off the disabled list four days earlier. Home plate umpire Lou DiMuro's son Mike was umpire for Roy Halladay's 2010 perfect game.)
172	August 19, 1969	Ken Holtzman (1)	Chicago Cubs	3	Atlanta Braves	0	NL	Bill Heath (7⅔ IP); Gene Oliver (1⅓ IP)	(Note: Holtzman did not strike out a batter the entire game.)
173	September 20, 1969	Bob Moose	Pittsburgh Pirates	4	New York Mets	0	NL	Manny Sanguillén	(Note: The Mets would go on to win the 1969 World Series.)
174	June 12, 1970	Dock Ellis	Pittsburgh Pirates	2	San Diego Padres	0	NL	Jerry May	(Note: First game of a doubleheader. Ellis later claimed to have been under the influence of LSD.)
175	July 3, 1970	Clyde Wright	California Angels	4	Oakland Athletics	0	AL	Joe Azcue (2)	(Note: In a pre-game ceremony, Wright had been inducted into the NAIA Hall of Fame.)
176	July 20, 1970	Bill Singer	Los Angeles Dodgers	5	Philadelphia Phillies	0	NL	Jeff Torborg (2)	(Note: Singer didn't issue a walk but did hit a batter and commit a throwing error.)
177	September 21, 1970	Vida Blue	Oakland Athletics	6	Minnesota Twins	0	AL	Gene Tenace (1)	(Note: Blue's third career win and eighth start. He had lost a no-hitter with two outs in the 8th inning two starts earlier. All four no-hitters of 1970 had been pitched in California.)
178	June 3, 1971	Ken Holtzman (2)	Chicago Cubs	1	Cincinnati Reds	0	NL	Danny Breeden	(Note: Holtzman scored the game's only run.)
179	June 23, 1971	Rick Wise	Philadelphia Phillies	4	Cincinnati Reds	0	NL	Tim McCarver (1)	(Note: Also hit 2 home runs. All-time hits leader Pete Rose hit a hard line drive right at Phillies third baseman John Vukovich for the final out. Reds were the first team since 1923 to be no-hit at home twice in a season.)
180	August 14, 1971	Bob Gibson ^{†}	St. Louis Cardinals	11	Pittsburgh Pirates	0	NL	Ted Simmons (1)^{†}	(Note: First no-hitter in Pittsburgh in 64 years. Pirates were no-hit at home for the first time since 1886, when they were a member of the American Association. First (and to date only) no-hitter with both a Hall of Fame pitcher and catcher.)
181	April 16, 1972	Burt Hooton	Chicago Cubs	4	Philadelphia Phillies	0	NL	Randy Hundley (1)	(Note: Hooton's fourth career start.)
182	September 2, 1972	Milt Pappas	Chicago Cubs	8	San Diego Padres	0	NL	Randy Hundley (2)	(Note: Walk with 2 outs in 9th inning only base-runner for Padres)
183	October 2, 1972	Bill Stoneman (2)	Montreal Expos	7	New York Mets	0	NL	Tim McCarver (2)	(Note: First game of a doubleheader. First no-hitter pitched in a regular-season game in Canada. Stoneman also pitched the first one in Montreal on April 17, 1969.)
184	April 27, 1973	Steve Busby (1)	Kansas City Royals	3	Detroit Tigers	0	AL	Fran Healy (1)	(Note: First no-hitter by a pitcher who did not come to bat the entire game, under the American League's new designated hitter rule.)
185	May 15, 1973	Nolan Ryan (1)^{†}	California Angels	3	Kansas City Royals	0	AL	Jeff Torborg (3)	
186	July 15, 1973	Nolan Ryan (2)^{†}	California Angels	6	Detroit Tigers	0	AL	Art Kusnyer	(Note: Pitched seven innings of no-hit ball in next start. Closest to tying Vander Meer's back-to-back no-hitters since Ewell Blackwell in 1947. Ryan's 17 strikeouts set a record for a no-hitter, tied in 2015 by Max Scherzer. He also became the fourth pitcher to throw two no-hitters in the same season.)
187	July 30, 1973	Jim Bibby	Texas Rangers	6	Oakland Athletics	0	AL	Dick Billings	
188	August 5, 1973	Phil Niekro ^{†}	Atlanta Braves	9	San Diego Padres	0	NL	Paul Casanova	
189	June 19, 1974	Steve Busby (2)	Kansas City Royals	2	Milwaukee Brewers	0	AL	Fran Healy (2)	(Note: Busby took a no-hitter into the 6th inning in his next start, setting an AL record by retiring 33 consecutive batters (the record stood until 1998). He is the only pitcher to throw a no-hitter in each of his first two seasons in the Majors.)
190	July 19, 1974	Dick Bosman	Cleveland Indians	4	Oakland Athletics	0	AL	John Ellis	(Note: Bosman's own fielding error with 2 outs in the 4th allowed Oakland's only base-runner (Sal Bando). Bosman threw only 79 pitches, 60 of which were for strikes.)
191	September 28, 1974	Nolan Ryan (3)^{†}	California Angels	4	Minnesota Twins	0	AL	Tom Egan	
192	June 1, 1975	Nolan Ryan (4)^{†}	California Angels	1	Baltimore Orioles	0	AL	Ellie Rodríguez	
193	August 24, 1975	Ed Halicki	San Francisco Giants	6	New York Mets	0	NL	Dave Rader	
194	September 28, 1975	Vida Blue (5 IP) Glenn Abbott (1 IP) Paul Lindblad (1 IP) Rollie Fingers (2 IP)^{†}	Oakland Athletics	5	California Angels	0	AL	Gene Tenace (2) (6 IP); Ray Fosse (1) (3 IP)	(Note: Final day of the regular season. First no-hitter involving more than two pitchers. The Athletics had already clinched the division title and removed Blue after five innings to rest him for the postseason.)
195	July 9, 1976	Larry Dierker	Houston Astros	6	Montreal Expos	0	NL	Ed Herrmann	(Note: First no-hitter thrown against the Expos, and the third the Expos had participated in (the other 2 were by Bill Stoneman in April 1969 and October 1972).)
196	July 28, 1976	Blue Moon Odom (5 IP) Francisco Barrios (4 IP)	Chicago White Sox	2	Oakland Athletics	1	AL	Jim Essian	(Note: Odom was removed after walking his ninth batter to lead off the sixth inning. This would be the last win of his career.)
197	August 9, 1976	John Candelaria	Pittsburgh Pirates	2	Los Angeles Dodgers	0	NL	Duffy Dyer	(Note: Candelaria became the first Pirates pitcher to throw a no-hitter at home since 1907. Game was televised on ABC.)
198	September 29, 1976	John Montefusco	San Francisco Giants	9	Atlanta Braves	0	NL	Gary Alexander	
199	May 14, 1977	Jim Colborn	Kansas City Royals	6	Texas Rangers	0	AL	Darrell Porter (1)	
200	May 30, 1977	Dennis Eckersley ^{†}	Cleveland Indians	1	California Angels	0	AL	Ray Fosse (2)	(Note: Eckersley had pitched seven hitless innings to finish his previous start, then took a no-hit bid into the sixth inning in his next. His 21 consecutive hitless innings was the longest streak since Cy Young in 1904. Eckersley spent nine more seasons as a starter before becoming a Hall of Fame closer. He retired with 390 saves, the most by any pitcher who also threw a no-hitter.)
201	September 22, 1977	Bert Blyleven ^{†}	Texas Rangers	6	California Angels	0	AL	Jim Sundberg	(Note: Blyleven's last start with the Rangers. He was traded to the Pittsburgh Pirates after the season.)
202	April 16, 1978	Bob Forsch (1)	St. Louis Cardinals	5	Philadelphia Phillies	0	NL	Ted Simmons (2)^{†}	(Note: First no-hitter at Busch Memorial Stadium.)
203	June 16, 1978	Tom Seaver ^{†}	Cincinnati Reds	4	St. Louis Cardinals	0	NL	Don Werner	(Note: Seaver had two previous bids broken up in the ninth, including a perfect game bid in 1969 while pitching for the Mets.)
204	April 7, 1979	Ken Forsch	Houston Astros	6	Atlanta Braves	0	NL	Alan Ashby (1)	(Note: Bob and Ken Forsch are the only set of brothers to have thrown no-hitters.)
205	June 27, 1980	Jerry Reuss	Los Angeles Dodgers	8	San Francisco Giants	0	NL	Steve Yeager	(Note: Only base-runner came on Bill Russell's error with 2 outs in the 1st inning)
206	May 10, 1981	Charlie Lea	Montreal Expos	4	San Francisco Giants	0	NL	Gary Carter ^{†}	(Note: Second game of a doubleheader. Third no-hitter in Expos history. Only no-hitter thrown by an Expos pitcher at Olympic Stadium. Previous 2 were one in Philadelphia and one also in Montreal, but at Jarry Park (Bill Stoneman in 1969 and 1972).)
207	May 15, 1981	Len Barker	Cleveland Indians	3	Toronto Blue Jays	0	AL	Ron Hassey (1)	(Note: First no-hitter thrown against the Blue Jays – the first no-hitter by a Toronto pitcher would also be played in Cleveland; see the entry for Dave Stieb's 1990 no-hitter.)
208	September 26, 1981	Nolan Ryan (5)^{†}	Houston Astros	5	Los Angeles Dodgers	0	NL	Alan Ashby (2)	(Note: Broke Sandy Koufax's old record of no-hitters. The Dodgers would go on to win the 1981 World Series. Game was televised by NBC.)
209	July 4, 1983	Dave Righetti	New York Yankees	4	Boston Red Sox	0	AL	Butch Wynegar	(Note: First no-hitter for the Yankees since Don Larsen's perfect game.)
210	September 26, 1983	Bob Forsch (2)	St. Louis Cardinals	3	Montreal Expos	0	NL	Darrell Porter (2)	(Note: Only base-runners came on a hit by pitch and an error in the second inning.)
211	September 29, 1983	Mike Warren	Oakland Athletics	3	Chicago White Sox	0	AL	Mike Heath	(Note: Warren's ninth career start. He would win just four more games in his career and finish with a record of 9–13.)
212	April 7, 1984	Jack Morris ^{†}	Detroit Tigers	4	Chicago White Sox	0	AL	Lance Parrish (1)	(Note: Game was televised on NBC. Fourth game of Tigers 1984 season. Detroit would start 9–0 and were 35–5 after 40 games. Went on to win 1984 World Series over San Diego Padres.)
213	September 30, 1984	Mike Witt	California Angels	1	Texas Rangers	0	AL	Bob Boone	(Note: Final day of the regular season.)
214	September 19, 1986	Joe Cowley	Chicago White Sox	7	California Angels	1	AL	Ron Karkovice (1)	(Note: Last win of his career. Cowley is the last pitcher to be charged with an earned run in a no-hitter.)
215	September 25, 1986	Mike Scott	Houston Astros	2	San Francisco Giants	0	NL	Alan Ashby (3)	(Note: Houston clinched the NL West title in this game.)
216	April 15, 1987	Juan Nieves	Milwaukee Brewers	7	Baltimore Orioles	0	AL	Bill Schroeder	(Note: Robin Yount made a diving catch in center field to rob Eddie Murray of a hit for the final out. Brewers' ninth win in a row to start the season; they would go on to win their first 13 games, tying the Major League record.)
217	September 16, 1988	Tom Browning	Cincinnati Reds	1	Los Angeles Dodgers	0	NL	Jeff Reed	(Note: The start of the game was delayed two and a half hours by rain. Browning's teammate Ron Robinson lost a perfect game with two outs in the ninth inning earlier in the season. The Dodgers would go on to win the 1988 World Series. Browning lost a perfect game in the ninth inning the next season, the closest any pitcher has come to throwing two perfect games.)
218	April 11, 1990	Mark Langston (7 IP) Mike Witt (2 IP)	California Angels	1	Seattle Mariners	0	AL	Lance Parrish (2)	(Note: Langston was making his Angels debut after signing a $16 million contract — at the time the largest in history — in the offseason. Witt is the only pitcher to throw a perfect game and be involved in a combined no-hitter. This was his first relief appearance since 1983.)
219	June 2, 1990	Randy Johnson (1)^{†}	Seattle Mariners	2	Detroit Tigers	0	AL	Scott Bradley	(Note: Johnson also threw a perfect game fourteen years later, the largest gap between no-hitters.)
220	June 11, 1990	Nolan Ryan (6)^{†}	Texas Rangers	5	Oakland Athletics	0	AL	John Russell	
221	June 29, 1990	Dave Stewart	Oakland Athletics	5	Toronto Blue Jays	0	AL	Terry Steinbach (1)	(Note: First of two no-hitters thrown on the same day. First no-hitter against the Blue Jays in Toronto)
222	June 29, 1990	Fernando Valenzuela	Los Angeles Dodgers	6	St. Louis Cardinals	0	NL	Mike Scioscia (1)	(Note: First month with four no-hitters.)
223	August 15, 1990	Terry Mulholland	Philadelphia Phillies	6	San Francisco Giants	0	NL	Darren Daulton	(Note: Only base-runner came on third baseman Charlie Hayes's error leading off the 7th. Hayes would later make a spectacular catch to end the game. Mulholland faced the minimum.)
224	September 2, 1990	Dave Stieb	Toronto Blue Jays	3	Cleveland Indians	0	AL	Pat Borders	(Note: Stieb lost three potential no-hitters in the ninth inning over the previous 2 years, including one that would have been a perfect game.)
225	May 1, 1991	Nolan Ryan (7)^{†}	Texas Rangers	3	Toronto Blue Jays	0	AL	Mike Stanley	(Note: Ryan's 7th and last no-hitter. At 44, Ryan is the oldest pitcher to throw a no-hitter.)
226	May 23, 1991	Tommy Greene	Philadelphia Phillies	2	Montreal Expos	0	NL	Darrin Fletcher	(Note: Second no-hitter thrown at Olympic Stadium in Montreal and the fourth one all time in Canada)
227	July 13, 1991	Bob Milacki (6 IP) Mike Flanagan (1 IP) Mark Williamson (1 IP) Gregg Olson (1 IP)	Baltimore Orioles	2	Oakland Athletics	0	AL	Chris Hoiles	(Note: First Orioles no-hitter since 1969, also against the Athletics. Milacki was hit on the hand by a ground ball in the sixth inning and had to leave the game after completing the inning.)
228	July 28, 1991	Dennis Martínez	Montreal Expos	2	Los Angeles Dodgers	0	NL	Ron Hassey (2)	(Note: Hassey becomes the first catcher of two Major League perfect games. Fourth and final no-hitter in Montreal Expos history and the only perfect game. Dodgers pitcher Mike Morgan also took a perfect game into the sixth inning. Game was televised in Canada by TSN.)
229	August 11, 1991	Wilson Álvarez	Chicago White Sox	7	Baltimore Orioles	0	AL	Ron Karkovice (2)	(Note: Second career start and first game with White Sox. Alvarez came into the game with a career ERA of infinity; in his only previous start, with Texas two seasons earlier, he had given up three runs without recording an out.)
230	August 26, 1991	Bret Saberhagen	Kansas City Royals	7	Chicago White Sox	0	AL	Brent Mayne	(Note: In the fifth inning, Dan Pasqua hit a fly ball to left field that deflected off the glove of Kirk Gibson. After initially being ruled a hit, the play was later changed to an error on Gibson.)
231	September 11, 1991	Kent Mercker (6 IP) Mark Wohlers (2 IP) Alejandro Peña (1 IP)	Atlanta Braves	1	San Diego Padres	0	NL	Greg Olson	(Note: Mercker had been primarily a reliever before this game and was making his third career start after 81 games out of the bullpen. Padres Hall of Famer Tony Gwynn made the final out, less than two months after his brother Chris was the last out of Martinez's perfect game.)
232	August 17, 1992	Kevin Gross	Los Angeles Dodgers	2	San Francisco Giants	0	NL	Mike Scioscia (2)	
233	April 22, 1993	Chris Bosio	Seattle Mariners	2	Boston Red Sox	0	AL	Dave Valle	(Note: Bosio walked the first two batters of the game, then retired 27 in a row.)
234	September 4, 1993	Jim Abbott	New York Yankees	4	Cleveland Indians	0	AL	Matt Nokes	(Note: Abbott was born without a right hand.)
235	September 8, 1993	Darryl Kile	Houston Astros	7	New York Mets	1	NL	Scott Servais (1)	(Note: The Mets scored a run in the fourth inning on a walk, a wild pitch, and an error.)
236	April 8, 1994	Kent Mercker	Atlanta Braves	6	Los Angeles Dodgers	0	NL	Javy Lopez	
237	April 27, 1994	Scott Erickson	Minnesota Twins	6	Milwaukee Brewers	0	AL	Matt Walbeck	
238	July 28, 1994	Kenny Rogers	Texas Rangers	4	California Angels	0	AL	Iván Rodríguez (1)^{†}	(Note: Fifth no-hitter in Rangers history and the fourteenth perfect game in MLB history. Preserved by a diving catch in the ninth inning by rookie center fielder Rusty Greer. Season shortened by the 1994–95 Major League Baseball strike.)
239	July 14, 1995	Ramón Martínez	Los Angeles Dodgers	7	Florida Marlins	0	NL	Mike Piazza (1) ^{†}	(Note: 22nd no-hitter in Dodgers history. Martínez lost a perfect game with two outs in the eighth inning due to a walk by the Marlins' only base-runner.)
240	May 11, 1996	Al Leiter	Florida Marlins	11	Colorado Rockies	0	NL	Charles Johnson (1)	(Note: First no-hitter in Marlins history)
241	May 14, 1996	Dwight Gooden	New York Yankees	2	Seattle Mariners	0	AL	Joe Girardi (1)	(Note: Gooden became the first right-handed pitcher to throw a no-hitter at Yankee Stadium since Don Larsen 40 years earlier.)
242	September 17, 1996	Hideo Nomo (1)	Los Angeles Dodgers	9	Colorado Rockies	0	NL	Mike Piazza (2)^{†}	(Note: First no-hitter thrown at Coors Field. First Japanese pitcher to record no-hitter.)
243	June 10, 1997	Kevin Brown	Florida Marlins	9	San Francisco Giants	0	NL	Charles Johnson (2)	(Note: Only base-runner was a hit by pitch with two outs in the 8th.)
244	July 12, 1997	Francisco Córdova (9 IP) Ricardo Rincón (1 IP)	Pittsburgh Pirates	3	Houston Astros	0	NL	Jason Kendall	(Note: 10 innings. Pinch-hitter Mark Smith hit a walk-off 3-run home run with two outs in the bottom of the tenth inning to secure the no-hitter.)
245	May 17, 1998	David Wells	New York Yankees	4	Minnesota Twins	0	AL	Jorge Posada	(Note: Part of a streak of 38 consecutive batters retired by Wells, a new AL record that stood until 2007. Wells claims to have been hung over.)
246	June 25, 1999	José Jiménez	St. Louis Cardinals	1	Arizona Diamondbacks	0	NL	Alberto Castillo	(Note: Ten days later, Jiménez again shut out the Diamondbacks 1–0, allowing only two hits. Randy Johnson was the losing pitcher in both games. Cardinals scored the only run of the game on Thomas Howard's RBI single with two outs in the top of the ninth inning. First no-hitter at Chase Field, then Bank One Ballpark.)
247	July 18, 1999	David Cone	New York Yankees (AL)	6	Montreal Expos (NL)	0	Inter	Joe Girardi (2)	(Note: First no-hitter/perfect game in regular-season interleague play. Pitched on Yogi Berra Day at Yankee Stadium, with Berra and Don Larsen in attendance.)
248	September 11, 1999	Eric Milton	Minnesota Twins	7	Anaheim Angels	0	AL	Terry Steinbach (2)	(Note: The Los Angeles Angels currently hold the longest streak the majors of not being no-hit. This was the last time it occurred. Game began at 11 a.m. local time due to a University of Minnesota football game that was scheduled to be played at the Metrodome that same night.)
249	April 4, 2001	Hideo Nomo (2)	Boston Red Sox	3	Baltimore Orioles	0	AL	Jason Varitek (1)	(Note: Nomo's first start with Red Sox. Second game of the season. Until 2024, earliest no-hitter by the calendar. First no-hitter at Camden Yards. The start of the game was delayed by 43 minutes due to a power outage in the stadium.)
250	May 12, 2001	A. J. Burnett	Florida Marlins	3	San Diego Padres	0	NL	Charles Johnson (3)	(Note: 7 strikeouts and 9 walks, most ever in a no-hitter.)
251	September 3, 2001	Bud Smith	St. Louis Cardinals	4	San Diego Padres	0	NL	Eli Marrero	
252	April 27, 2002	Derek Lowe	Boston Red Sox	10	Tampa Bay Devil Rays	0	AL	Jason Varitek (2)	
253	April 27, 2003	Kevin Millwood	Philadelphia Phillies	1	San Francisco Giants	0	NL	Mike Lieberthal	(Note: On Phillie Phanatic's birthday and their last season at Veterans Stadium. Occurred during the 2003 NFL draft. ESPN broke away from covering the draft to air the ninth inning.)
254	June 11, 2003	Roy Oswalt (1 IP) Pete Munro (2⅔ IP) Kirk Saarloos (1⅓ IP) Brad Lidge (2 IP) Octavio Dotel (1 IP) Billy Wagner (1 IP)^{†}	Houston Astros (NL)	8	New York Yankees (AL)	0	Inter	Brad Ausmus	(Note: Last no-hitter thrown at the original Yankee Stadium before it closed in 2008. Oswalt left with an injury in the second inning. Originally held the record for most pitchers used in a combined no-hitter, which was tied on June 8, 2012 when the Mariners no-hit the Dodgers. First interleague no-hitter thrown by away team. First no-hitter thrown by an NL team against an AL team. First official no-hitter against the Yankees in 44 years, a then-Major League record. Octavio Dotel struck out four Yankees in the eighth inning, the first Astros pitcher to pull off the feat since 1986.)
255	May 18, 2004	Randy Johnson (2)^{†}	Arizona Diamondbacks	2	Atlanta Braves	0	NL	Robby Hammock	(Note: Previous no-hitter almost fourteen years earlier.)
256	September 6, 2006	Aníbal Sánchez	Florida Marlins	2	Arizona Diamondbacks	0	NL	Miguel Olivo (1)	(Note: Diamondbacks are most recent team to perform a no-hitter then suffer the following one. First MLB no-hitter in 6,364 games, the longest gap between no-hitters in history as measured by games played. Randy Johnson, most recent pitcher to throw a no-hitter at the time, took a no-hitter into the seventh inning the same day.)
257	April 18, 2007	Mark Buehrle (1)	Chicago White Sox	6	Texas Rangers	0	AL	A. J. Pierzynski (1)	(Note: Buehrle faced the minimum 27 batters. The only base-runner (Sammy Sosa) was picked off of first base.)
258	June 12, 2007	Justin Verlander (1)	Detroit Tigers (AL)	4	Milwaukee Brewers (NL)	0	Inter	Iván Rodríguez (2)^{†}	(Note: First no-hitter at Comerica Park.)
259	September 1, 2007	Clay Buchholz	Boston Red Sox	10	Baltimore Orioles	0	AL	Jason Varitek (3)	(Note: Second career game for Buchholz.)
260	May 19, 2008	Jon Lester	Boston Red Sox	7	Kansas City Royals	0	AL	Jason Varitek (4)	(Note: First time since the 1974 California Angels that one team had last two no-hitters in the majors. Varitek sets the record for most no-hitters caught.)
261	September 14, 2008	Carlos Zambrano	Chicago Cubs	5	Houston Astros	0	NL	Geovany Soto	(Note: Played at Miller Park in Milwaukee because of Hurricane Ike, making it the first no-hitter at a neutral site.)
262	July 10, 2009	Jonathan Sánchez	San Francisco Giants	8	San Diego Padres	0	NL	Eli Whiteside	(Note: Only base-runner came on Juan Uribe's error with one out in the 8th. Sánchez was 2–8 on the season with a 5.30 ERA at the time and had recently been demoted to the bullpen.)
263	July 23, 2009	Mark Buehrle (2)	Chicago White Sox	5	Tampa Bay Rays	0	AL	Ramón Castro	(Note: Second perfect game in White Sox history. Umpire Eric Cooper called both of Buehrle's no-hitters. In the ninth, new center fielder DeWayne Wise leapt over the wall to take a potential home run away from Gabe Kapler. Buehrle retired first 17 batters in his next start to set the record for consecutive batters retired at 45 (later broken by Yusmeiro Petit), spanning three starts.)
264	April 17, 2010	Ubaldo Jiménez	Colorado Rockies	4	Atlanta Braves	0	NL	Miguel Olivo (2)	(Note: First no-hitter in Rockies franchise history.)
265	May 9, 2010	Dallas Braden	Oakland Athletics	4	Tampa Bay Rays	0	AL	Landon Powell	(Note: Second perfect game in 12 months. This game was also held on Mother's Day. It was the second perfect game in Oakland Athletics history.)
266	May 29, 2010	Roy Halladay (1) ^{†}	Philadelphia Phillies	1	Florida Marlins	0	NL	Carlos Ruiz (1)	(Note: Shortest span between perfect games (20 days). Home plate umpire Mike DiMuro's father, Lou, was umpire for Jim Palmer's 1969 no-hitter.)
267	June 25, 2010	Edwin Jackson	Arizona Diamondbacks (NL)	1	Tampa Bay Rays (AL)	0	Inter	Miguel Montero (1)	(Note: Jackson walked eight and hit a batter on 149 pitches, the most ever for a no-hitter in MLB history. The Rays became the first team since the 2001 Padres to be no-hit twice in a season, and the first team in history to be no-hit three times within a one-year span.)
268	July 26, 2010	Matt Garza	Tampa Bay Rays	5	Detroit Tigers	0	AL	Kelly Shoppach	(Note: Garza faced the minimum (only base-runner allowed was retired on a double play). Opposing starter Max Scherzer threw 5⅔ no-hit innings. The Rays are the first team since 1991 to pitch a no-hitter and be no-hit in the same season, and the first since 1956 to be involved in three no-hitters in one season. Game televised nationally on ESPN.)
269	October 6, 2010 §	Roy Halladay (2) ^{†}	Philadelphia Phillies	4	Cincinnati Reds	0	NL	Carlos Ruiz (2)	(Note: Game 1 of the 2010 NLDS. Second no-hitter in postseason history, after Don Larsen's perfect game in the 1956 World Series. Halladay became the fifth pitcher to pitch two no-hitters in the same calendar year (including the postseason), and the first one to do it with a perfect game. One batter reached base. Game was televised by TBS.)
270	May 3, 2011	Francisco Liriano	Minnesota Twins	1	Chicago White Sox	0	AL	Drew Butera (1)	(Note: First complete game of Liriano's career, in 95 starts. His season ERA entering the game was 9.13.)
271	May 7, 2011	Justin Verlander (2)	Detroit Tigers	9	Toronto Blue Jays	0	AL	Alex Avila	(Note: Verlander faced the minimum 27 batters.)
272	July 27, 2011	Ervin Santana	Los Angeles Angels of Anaheim	3	Cleveland Indians	1	AL	Bobby Wilson	
273	April 21, 2012	Philip Humber	Chicago White Sox	4	Seattle Mariners	0	AL	A. J. Pierzynski (2)	(Note: Third perfect game in White Sox history and the first no-hitter thrown at Safeco Field. This was also Humber's only career complete game. Game was televised regionally by Fox; the network cut away from a New York Yankees-Boston Red Sox game to show the final inning nationally.)
274	May 2, 2012	Jered Weaver	Los Angeles Angels of Anaheim	9	Minnesota Twins	0	AL	Chris Iannetta	
275	June 1, 2012	Johan Santana	New York Mets	8	St. Louis Cardinals	0	NL	Josh Thole	(Note: First no-hitter in Mets history and the first no-hitter thrown at Citi Field. A ball hit by St. Louis' Carlos Beltrán was controversially ruled foul by the third base umpire, preserving the no-hitter in the 6th inning.)
276	June 8, 2012	Kevin Millwood (6 IP) Charlie Furbush (⅔ IP) Stephen Pryor (⅓ IP) Lucas Luetge (⅓ IP) Brandon League (⅔ IP) Tom Wilhelmsen (1 IP)	Seattle Mariners (AL)	1	Los Angeles Dodgers (NL)	0	Inter	Jesús Montero	(Note: Third no-hitter in Mariners history and the second no-hitter thrown at T-Mobile Park (then Safeco Field). Millwood left with an injury after the sixth inning. Tied record for most pitchers used in a combined no-hitter. For Pryor, it was his first career victory.)
277	June 13, 2012	Matt Cain	San Francisco Giants	10	Houston Astros	0	NL	Buster Posey (1)	(Note: First perfect game in Giants history.)
278	August 15, 2012	Félix Hernández	Seattle Mariners	1	Tampa Bay Rays	0	AL	John Jaso	(Note: First perfect game in Mariners history. Seattle becomes the first team with a combined no-hitter and a traditional no-hitter in a single season.)
279	September 28, 2012	Homer Bailey (1)	Cincinnati Reds	1	Pittsburgh Pirates	0	NL	Ryan Hanigan (1)	(Note: First no-hitter by a Reds pitcher since Browning's perfect game in 1988. Pirates were no-hit for the first time since 1971.)
280	July 2, 2013	Homer Bailey (2)	Cincinnati Reds	3	San Francisco Giants	0	NL	Ryan Hanigan (2)	(Note: Bailey is the first pitcher since Nolan Ryan in 1974–75 to have thrown the Major Leagues' last two no-hitters.)
281	July 13, 2013	Tim Lincecum (1)	San Francisco Giants	9	San Diego Padres	0	NL	Buster Posey (2)	(Note: First no-hitter ever thrown in San Diego's Petco Park. Lincecum was the losing pitcher in Bailey's no-hitter 11 days earlier.)
282	September 29, 2013	Henderson Álvarez	Miami Marlins (NL)	1	Detroit Tigers (AL)	0	Inter	Koyie Hill	(Note: 5th no-hitter in Marlins history, and the first ever thrown at Marlins Park. The Marlins scored the winning run in the bottom of the ninth on a wild pitch, with Álvarez standing in the on-deck circle. It was the first no-hitter to end in walk-off fashion since Cordova and Rincon combined for a 10-inning no-no in 1997. It was also the first no-hitter thrown on the last day of the regular season since Mike Witt's perfect game on September 30, 1984.)
283	May 25, 2014	Josh Beckett	Los Angeles Dodgers	6	Philadelphia Phillies	0	NL	Drew Butera (2)	(Note: Twenty-fourth no-hitter in Dodgers franchise history and the second thrown at Citizens Bank Park. Beckett fanned six and walked three on his 128 pitch outing. In the ninth inning, he struck out Chase Utley to secure the victory.)
284	June 18, 2014	Clayton Kershaw	Los Angeles Dodgers	8	Colorado Rockies	0	NL	A. J. Ellis	(Note: Rockies' only base-runner came on a throwing error in the seventh. Kershaw became the first MLB pitcher ever with 15 strikeouts without allowing a single hit or walk. It was also the 3rd no-hitter by a reigning Cy Young Award winner, following Sandy Koufax (1963 CY, 1964 NH) and Bob Gibson (1970 CY, 1971 NH).)
285	June 25, 2014	Tim Lincecum (2)	San Francisco Giants	4	San Diego Padres	0	NL	Héctor Sánchez	(Note: Lincecum's second no-hitter in less than a year. Lincecum became the second pitcher all-time, after Addie Joss, to no-hit the same team twice.)
286	September 1, 2014	Cole Hamels (6 IP) Jake Diekman (1 IP) Ken Giles (1 IP) Jonathan Papelbon (1 IP)	Philadelphia Phillies	7	Atlanta Braves	0	NL	Carlos Ruiz (3)	(Note: Labor Day. First combined no-hitter in Phillies history and twelfth overall.)
287	September 28, 2014	Jordan Zimmermann	Washington Nationals	1	Miami Marlins	0	NL	Wilson Ramos (1)	(Note: Nationals rookie Steven Souza Jr., who came in as a defensive replacement in the top of the ninth inning, made a diving catch in left-center field to retire Christian Yelich for the final out. First no-hitter for the Nationals since the team moved to Washington, and the first by any Washington pitcher since Bobby Burke in 1931. This was the final game for both teams for the 2014 season, and it was the second year in a row in which a no-hitter had been thrown on the final day of the regular season. Henderson Álvarez, who had thrown Miami's no-hitter on the final day of the 2013 season, was the losing pitcher in this game.)
288	June 9, 2015	Chris Heston	San Francisco Giants	5	New York Mets	0	NL	Buster Posey (3)	(Note: Seventeenth no-hitter in Giants franchise history, and the second no-hitter thrown at Citi Field. Heston was the 22nd rookie pitcher to throw a no-hitter. He did not walk a batter, but he hit three of them, joining Wiltse in 1908, Burdette in 1960, and Brown in 1997 as no-hitter pitchers whose only base-runners came on hit batsmen. Heston's is the first such game to feature more than one hit by pitch.)
289	June 20, 2015	Max Scherzer (1) ^{‡}	Washington Nationals	6	Pittsburgh Pirates	0	NL	Wilson Ramos (2)	(Note: Scherzer was perfect through 8⅔ innings when he hit pinch-hitter José Tábata to allow the Pirates' only base-runner of the game. Fifth no-hitter pitcher after Wiltse, Burdette, Brown, and Heston to only allow their base-runners on hit batsmen, and the second after Wiltse to lose a perfect game with two outs in the ninth inning on a hit batsman. Scherzer threw a one-hitter, having been perfect for 6 innings, in his previous start, and was perfect through 5 in his next start after this no-hitter.)
290	July 25, 2015	Cole Hamels	Philadelphia Phillies	5	Chicago Cubs	0	NL	Carlos Ruiz (4)	(Note: Fifth pitcher, after Blue, Witt, Mercker, and Millwood, to pitch a complete game no-hitter as well as contribute to a combined no-hitter. Kris Bryant flew out to Odubel Herrera, who tripped after losing the ball in the sun, on a full count for the final out. This was also the first time that the Cubs were no-hit since Sandy Koufax's perfect game in 1965, and the first no-hitter thrown at Wrigley Field since 1972. Hamels' last start with the Phillies as he was traded to the Texas Rangers six days later.)
291	August 12, 2015	Hisashi Iwakuma	Seattle Mariners	3	Baltimore Orioles	0	AL	Jesús Sucre	(Note: Second Japanese pitcher to throw a Major League no-hitter, after Hideo Nomo. First no-hitter in an American League game since teammate Félix Hernández's perfect game almost exactly three years prior, breaking a string of 12 straight NL no-hitters.)
292	August 21, 2015	Mike Fiers (1)	Houston Astros (AL)	3	Los Angeles Dodgers (NL)	0	Inter	Jason Castro	(Note: Eleventh no-hitter in Astros history, and the first no-hitter for the Astros as an American League team. This was also the first complete-game no-hitter by an Astros pitcher since Darryl Kile did it in 1993. First complete game no-hit shutout pitched by Houston since Mike Scott in 1986.)
293	August 30, 2015	Jake Arrieta (1)	Chicago Cubs	2	Los Angeles Dodgers	0	NL	Miguel Montero (2)	(Note: Dodgers no-hit for the second time in 9 days; this is the shortest interval since the 1923 Philadelphia Athletics and the first time a team were no-hit twice in one calendar month since the 1971 Cincinnati Reds.)
294	October 3, 2015	Max Scherzer (2) ^{‡}	Washington Nationals	2	New York Mets	0	NL	Wilson Ramos (3)	(Note: Second game of a doubleheader. Scherzer's second no-hitter of the season; both of which also featured no walks. Scherzer was perfect through 5 innings before an error by 3B Yunel Escobar. Scherzer's 17 strikeouts tied Nolan Ryan's record for most in a no-hitter and included 9 straight. Second highest game score ever for a nine-inning game, with 104, following Kerry Wood's 1998 one-hit complete-game shutout. Scherzer becomes the fifth pitcher to throw two no-hitters in the same season.)
295	April 21, 2016	Jake Arrieta (2)	Chicago Cubs	16	Cincinnati Reds	0	NL	David Ross	(Note: Fifteenth no-hitter in Cubs history. Most run support in a no-hitter since 1884. First regular season no-hitter against the Reds since 1971. Fourth no-hitter thrown by a reigning Cy Young Award winner. Game televised by ESPN.)
296	June 3, 2017	Edinson Vólquez	Miami Marlins	3	Arizona Diamondbacks	0	NL	J. T. Realmuto (1) ^{‡}	(Note: Sixth no-hitter in Marlins history. Vólquez faced the minimum 27 batters. Thrown on the birthday of Vólquez's friend and teammate Yordano Ventura, who had died in a car crash the previous January.)
297	April 21, 2018	Sean Manaea ^{‡}	Oakland Athletics	3	Boston Red Sox	0	AL	Jonathan Lucroy	(Note: Twelfth no-hitter in Athletics history and the first no-hitter since Dallas Braden's perfect game in 2010. Red Sox no-hit for the first time since 1993. Red Sox came into the game with a record of 17–2, the best winning percentage by a team who had a no-hitter thrown against them in history. First time since 1988 that a no-hitter was thrown against that season's World Series champions.)
298	May 4, 2018	Walker Buehler (6 IP)^{‡} Tony Cingrani (1 IP) Yimi García (1 IP)^{‡} Adam Liberatore (1 IP)	Los Angeles Dodgers	4	San Diego Padres	0	NL	Yasmani Grandal ^{‡}	(Note: Game played in Monterrey, Mexico. First no-hitter thrown outside the United States or Canada. Second no-hitter thrown at a neutral site. Buehler's third career start.)
299	May 8, 2018	James Paxton	Seattle Mariners	5	Toronto Blue Jays	0	AL	Mike Zunino	(Note: Sixth no-hitter in Mariners history. Second no-hitter thrown by a Canadian pitcher, first since 1945 (Dick Fowler), and first by a Canadian pitcher in Canada. Third different country in which a no-hitter was thrown in 2018.)
300	May 7, 2019	Mike Fiers (2)	Oakland Athletics (AL)	2	Cincinnati Reds (NL)	0	Inter	Josh Phegley	(Note: Thirteenth no-hitter in Athletics history. Mike Fiers becomes the 35th pitcher in MLB history to throw two no-hitters.)
301	July 12, 2019	Taylor Cole (2 IP) Félix Peña (7 IP)^{‡}	Los Angeles Angels	13	Seattle Mariners	0	AL	Dustin Garneau	(Note: Eleventh no-hitter and the second combined no-hitter in Angels history. Largest run differential in a no-hitter by an AL team since 1938. In their first home games since his death on July 1st, the Angels were honoring pitcher Tyler Skaggs, having every team member wear his jersey. First no-hitter involving the use of an opener.)
302	August 3, 2019	Aaron Sanchez (6 IP)^{‡} Will Harris (1 IP) Joe Biagini (1 IP) Chris Devenski (1 IP)^{‡}	Houston Astros	9	Seattle Mariners	0	AL	Martín Maldonado	(Note: Twelfth no-hitter and the second combined no-hitter in Astros history. First start by Sanchez since being acquired from the Toronto Blue Jays along with Biagini. Sanchez came into the game without a win in his last 17 starts and with a 6.07 ERA, worst among all starting pitchers. Mariners are the first team to have two combined no-hitters against them in one season.)
303	September 1, 2019	Justin Verlander (3)	Houston Astros	2	Toronto Blue Jays	0	AL	Robinson Chirinos	(Note: Thirteenth no-hitter in Astros history. Retired the last twenty-six batters in a row after a first-inning walk. Verlander became the third pitcher after Addie Joss and Tim Lincecum to no-hit the same opponent twice, and the first to do so on the road. He also became the sixth pitcher in MLB history to throw three career no-hitters. Astros scored the only runs of the game on Abraham Toro's two-run home run with two outs in the top of the ninth inning.)
304	August 25, 2020	Lucas Giolito ^{‡}	Chicago White Sox (AL)	4	Pittsburgh Pirates (NL)	0	Inter	James McCann (1) ^{‡}	(Note: Nineteenth no-hitter in White Sox history. Giolito struck out 13, the most ever in a White Sox no-hitter, and allowed only one base-runner, a four-pitch walk to Erik Gonzalez in the fourth inning. Took place with no fans in attendance due to the COVID-19 pandemic.)
305	September 13, 2020	Alec Mills	Chicago Cubs	12	Milwaukee Brewers	0	NL	Víctor Caratini (1) ^{‡}	(Note: Mills' first complete game and 15th career start, the fewest by a Cubs pitcher before throwing a no-hitter since 1972. With Lucas Giolito 19 days earlier, this was the first time both Chicago teams threw a no-hitter in the same season. Second no-hitter at Miller Park; the first was also by a Cubs pitcher, Carlos Zambrano in 2008. Took place with no fans in attendance due to the COVID-19 pandemic. First NL-site no-hitter where designated hitters were used.)
306	April 9, 2021	Joe Musgrove ^{‡}	San Diego Padres (NL)	3	Texas Rangers (AL)	0	Inter	Víctor Caratini (2) ^{‡}	(Note: First no-hitter in Padres history. First no-hitter at Globe Life Field. Musgrove didn't walk a batter, the only baserunner coming when he hit Joey Gallo with a pitch in the fourth inning.)
307	April 14, 2021	Carlos Rodón ^{‡}	Chicago White Sox	8	Cleveland Indians	0	AL	Zack Collins	(Note: Rodón had a perfect game broken up with one out in the 9th after hitting Roberto Pérez with a pitch.)
308	May 5, 2021	John Means ^{‡}	Baltimore Orioles	6	Seattle Mariners	0	AL	Pedro Severino ^{‡}	(Note: First no-hitter by an Orioles pitcher since 1969, and the first on the road since 1912. Means faced the minimum 27 batters, the only base-runner coming on a dropped third strike with one out in the 3rd inning. This is the only known instance of a perfect game being broken up in such a way.)
309	May 7, 2021	Wade Miley ^{‡}	Cincinnati Reds (NL)	3	Cleveland Indians (AL)	0	Inter	Tucker Barnhart	(Note: At the age of 34 years and 175 days, Miley was the oldest pitcher to throw his first no-hitter since David Cone in 1999. First time the Indians were no-hit twice in a season. Zach Plesac was the opposing pitcher in both games and Jordan Luplow was the final out both times. Additionally, the Reds became the first team to no-hit their interleague rival and only the second team to no-hit a team from the opposite league that plays their home games in the same state as them, after Don Larsen’s perfect game. It was also the first time two interleague no-hitters were thrown in the same season.)
310	May 18, 2021	Spencer Turnbull ^{‡}	Detroit Tigers	5	Seattle Mariners	0	AL	Eric Haase (1) ^{‡}	(Note: Eighth no-hitter in Tigers history, and first since 2011. First time there had been five no-hitters thrown this early in a season since 1917. Mariners were no-hit at home for the second time in 13 days, the first team to do that since 1923.)
311	May 19, 2021	Corey Kluber	New York Yankees	2	Texas Rangers	0	AL	Kyle Higashioka (1) ^{‡}	(Note: First no-hitter by a Yankees pitcher since Cone's perfect game in 1999, and first on the road since 1951. First time there were no-hitters thrown on consecutive days since 1969. First time there had been six no-hitters thrown this early in a season. First time three teams were no-hit twice in the same season. First time five no-hitters were thrown on the road in the same season. Second month with four no-hitters (June 1990).)
312	June 24, 2021	Zach Davies (6 IP)^{‡} Ryan Tepera (1 IP)^{‡} Andrew Chafin (1 IP)^{‡} Craig Kimbrel (1 IP)^{‡}	Chicago Cubs	4	Los Angeles Dodgers	0	NL	Willson Contreras ^{‡}	(Note: Seventh no-hitter of 2021, tying a modern-era MLB record. First time seven no-hitters had been thrown before July. First time six no-hitters were thrown on the road in the same season. 20th time the Dodgers were no-hit, breaking an MLB record. The Dodgers were the first reigning World Series champions to be no-hit since the 2013 San Francisco Giants, and the first team to have three MVPs in the lineup (Mookie Betts, Cody Bellinger, and Albert Pujols) to be no-hit. The eight walks given up by the Cubs were the most in a no-hitter since Edwin Jackson in 2010.)
313	August 14, 2021	Tyler Gilbert ^{‡}	Arizona Diamondbacks	7	San Diego Padres	0	NL	Daulton Varsho ^{‡}	(Note: Eighth no-hitter of 2021, tying an MLB record set in 1884. This was Gilbert's first career MLB start; he became the fourth player to throw a no-hitter in their first MLB start, and the first since Holloman in 1953. First no-hitter thrown by the Diamondbacks at Chase Field, and their third overall, following Johnson and Jackson. Last no-hitter in which pitchers were obligated to bat, prior to the National League's permanent adoption of the designated hitter.)
314	September 11, 2021	Corbin Burnes (8 IP) ^{‡} Josh Hader (1 IP) ^{‡}	Milwaukee Brewers (NL)	3	Cleveland Indians (AL)	0	Inter	Omar Narváez ^{‡}	(Note: Ninth no-hitter of 2021, breaking an MLB record set in 1884. First time seven no-hitters were thrown on the road in the same season. Second no-hitter in Brewers history; first to be a combined no-hitter. Indians became the first team to be no-hit three times in one season; Zach Plesac was the opposing pitcher all three times. It was also the first time three interleague no-hitters were thrown in the same season.)
315	April 29, 2022	Tylor Megill (5 IP) ^{‡} Drew Smith (1⅓ IP) ^{‡} Joely Rodríguez (1 IP) ^{‡} Seth Lugo (⅔ IP) ^{‡} Edwin Díaz (1 IP) ^{‡}	New York Mets	3	Philadelphia Phillies	0	NL	James McCann (2) ^{‡}	(Note: Second no-hitter in Mets history; first to be a combined no-hitter. 20th time the Phillies were no-hit, tying the record set by the Dodgers. Mets pitchers combined to throw 159 pitches, the most in any no-hitter on record.)
316	May 10, 2022	Reid Detmers ^{‡}	Los Angeles Angels	12	Tampa Bay Rays	0	AL	Chad Wallach ^{‡}	(Note: 12th no-hitter in Angels history. 25th time a rookie has thrown a no-hitter. Also the first time Detmers and Wallach were batterymates.)
317	June 25, 2022	Cristian Javier (7 IP) ^{‡} Héctor Neris (1 IP) ^{‡} Ryan Pressly (1 IP) ^{‡}	Houston Astros	3	New York Yankees	0	AL	Martín Maldonado (2)	(Note: 14th no-hitter in Astros history.)
318	November 2, 2022 §	Cristian Javier (6 IP) ^{‡} Bryan Abreu (1 IP) ^{‡} Rafael Montero (1 IP) ^{‡} Ryan Pressly (1 IP) ^{‡}	Houston Astros (AL)	5	Philadelphia Phillies (NL)	0	WS	Christian Vázquez (1) ^{‡}	(Note: Game 4 of the 2022 World Series. Game was televised by Fox. 15th no-hitter in Astros history. First time a team has thrown two combined no-hitters in the same season. Javier and Pressly are the first pitchers to contribute to multiple combined no-hitters. 21st time the Phillies were no-hit, breaking the MLB record set by the Dodgers. First combined no-hitter, and second overall, in World Series history. First no-hitter in the month of November.)
319	June 28, 2023	Domingo Germán ^{‡}	New York Yankees	11	Oakland Athletics	0	AL	Kyle Higashioka (2) ^{‡}	(Note: Fourth perfect game in Yankees history and 13th no-hitter. First no-hitter thrown in MLB with a pitch clock in place.)
320	July 8, 2023	Matt Manning (6⅔ IP) ^{‡} Jason Foley (1⅓ IP) ^{‡} Alex Lange (1 IP) ^{‡}	Detroit Tigers	2	Toronto Blue Jays	0	AL	Eric Haase (2) ^{‡}	(Note: First combined no-hitter in Tigers history and ninth overall.)
321	August 1, 2023	Framber Valdez ^{‡}	Houston Astros	2	Cleveland Guardians	0	AL	Martín Maldonado (3)	(Note: 16th no-hitter in Astros history, first by a left-handed pitcher. Faced the minimum 27 batters. Valdez pitched seven hitless innings four starts later before being removed from the game, and would come within one out of throwing a second no-hitter the following year.)
322	August 9, 2023	Michael Lorenzen ^{‡}	Philadelphia Phillies	7	Washington Nationals	0	NL	J. T. Realmuto (2) ^{‡}	(Note: 14th no-hitter in Phillies history. Lorenzen was making his second start with the Phillies, and first at home, since being acquired eight days earlier. First time the Nationals were no-hit since moving to Washington.)
323	April 1, 2024	Ronel Blanco ^{‡}	Houston Astros	10	Toronto Blue Jays	0	AL	Yainer Díaz ^{‡}	(Note: 17th no-hitter in Astros history. Earliest calendar date for a no-hitter in MLB history.)
324	July 25, 2024	Dylan Cease ^{‡}	San Diego Padres	3	Washington Nationals	0	NL	Luis Campusano ^{‡}	(Note: Second no-hitter in Padres history.)
325	August 2, 2024	Blake Snell ^{‡}	San Francisco Giants	3	Cincinnati Reds	0	NL	Patrick Bailey ^{‡}	(Note: 18th no-hitter in Giants history. Snell’s first win as a Giant.)
326	September 4, 2024	Shota Imanaga (7 IP) ^{‡} Nate Pearson (1 IP) ^{‡} Porter Hodge (1 IP) ^{‡}	Chicago Cubs	12	Pittsburgh Pirates	0	NL	Miguel Amaya ^{‡}	(Note: 2nd combined no-hitter thrown in Cubs history and 18th overall. First Cubs no-hitter thrown at Wrigley Field since 1972. Imanaga becomes the third Japanese-born pitcher to throw a no-hitter, and the first since Hisashi Iwakuma in 2015. The losing pitcher, Domingo Germán, threw a perfect game against the Athletics the previous year, the 24th in baseball history.)
327	May 25, 2026	Tatsuya Imai (6 IP) ^{‡} Steven Okert (1 IP) ^{‡} Alimber Santa (2 IP) ^{‡}	Houston Astros	9	Texas Rangers	0	AL	Christian Vázquez (2) ^{‡}	(Note: 5th combined no-hitter thrown in Astros history and 18th overall. Game took place on Memorial Day. Alimber Santa joined Bumpus Jones as the only pitcher to be involved in a no-hitter in his first career game. The final out of the game, a strikeout looking to Brandon Nimmo, was Santa's first career strikeout. First no-hitter in MLB history to be won on an Automatic Balls and Strikes (ABS) challenge.)

== No-hitters by team ==
=== Current teams ===
Team	No-hitters pitched	No-hitters pitched against	Most recent pitched	Most recent pitched against
Los Angeles Dodgers	26	20	May 4, 2018	June 24, 2021
Chicago White Sox	20	13	April 14, 2021	May 3, 2011
Houston Astros	18	5	May 25, 2026	**June 13, 2012**
Chicago Cubs	18	7	September 4, 2024	July 25, 2015
Boston Red Sox	18	12	May 19, 2008	April 21, 2018
San Francisco Giants	18	16	August 2, 2024	July 2, 2013
Cincinnati Reds	17	14	May 7, 2021	August 2, 2024
Cleveland Guardians	14	13	**May 15, 1981**	August 1, 2023
Atlanta Braves	14	17	April 8, 1994	September 1, 2014
Philadelphia Phillies	14	21	August 9, 2023	November 2, 2022
New York Yankees	13	7	**June 28, 2023**	June 25, 2022
Athletics	13	15	May 7, 2019	**June 28, 2023**
Los Angeles Angels	12	7	May 10, 2022	September 11, 1999
St. Louis Cardinals	10	9	September 3, 2001	June 1, 2012
Baltimore Orioles (modern)	10	15	May 5, 2021	August 12, 2015
Detroit Tigers	9	14	July 8, 2023	September 29, 2013
Washington Nationals (modern)	7	6	October 3, 2015	July 25, 2024
Minnesota Twins	7	9	May 3, 2011	May 2, 2012
Miami Marlins	6	3	June 3, 2017	September 28, 2014
Seattle Mariners	6	7	May 8, 2018	May 18, 2021
Pittsburgh Pirates	6	14	July 12, 1997	September 4, 2024
Texas Rangers	5	7	**July 28, 1994**	May 25, 2026
Kansas City Royals	4	2	August 26, 1991	May 19, 2008
Arizona Diamondbacks	3	3	August 14, 2021	June 3, 2017
Milwaukee Brewers (modern)	2	4	September 11, 2021	September 13, 2020
New York Mets	2	8	April 29, 2022	October 3, 2015
San Diego Padres	2	10	July 25, 2024	August 14, 2021
Colorado Rockies	1	3	April 17, 2010	June 18, 2014
Tampa Bay Rays	1	6	July 26, 2010	May 10, 2022
Toronto Blue Jays	1	8	September 2, 1990	April 1, 2024

Italics: Multiple pitchers used for combined no-hitter

Bold: Perfect Game

=== Defunct teams ===
Team	No-hitters pitched	No-hitters pitched against
Louisville Colonels	4	2
Philadelphia Athletics	4	0
Baltimore Orioles (AA/NL)	3	2
Buffalo Bisons	2	1
Columbus Buckeyes	2	0
Providence Grays	2	3
Brooklyn Tip-Tops	1	0
Chicago Chi-Feds/Whales	1	1
Cincinnati Outlaw Reds	1	0
Cleveland Blues	1	2
Cleveland Spiders	1	0
Kansas City Cowboys (AA)	1	1
Kansas City Packers	1	1
Milwaukee Brewers (UA)	1	0
Pittsburgh Rebels	1	1
Rochester Broncos	1	0
St. Louis Brown Stockings	1	0
St. Louis Terriers	1	1
Worcester Worcesters	1	2
Buffalo Blues	0	1
Detroit Wolverines	0	1
Hartford Dark Blues	0	1
Kansas City Cowboys (UA)	0	1
New York Metropolitans	0	1
Syracuse Stars	0	1
Toledo Blue Stockings	0	1
Washington Nationals (AA)	0	1
Washington Nationals (UA)	0	1
Washington Senators (AA/NL)	0	2

== Longest no-hitter droughts throughout history ==
=== No-hitter pitched ===
The longest active drought of a team having a no-hitter is the Cleveland Guardians (known as the Indians at the time), who last pitched a no-hitter on May 15, 1981, 45 years, 6 months and 4 days ago.

The longest such drought in MLB history belongs to the Philadelphia Phillies, who had a span of 58 years, 1 month and 20 days between pitching a no-hitter.

Team	Last no-hitter pitched			Next no-hitter pitched			Length of drought	Tenure of record	Longest 8+ IP no-hit bid before first hit during span
Team	Pitcher(s)	Team	Date of no-hitter	Pitcher(s)	Team	Date of no-hitter	Length of drought	Tenure of record	Longest 8+ IP no-hit bid before first hit during span
Cleveland Guardians	Len Barker	Toronto Blue Jays	May 15, 1981	Active			45 years, 6 months and 4 days	5 years, 7 months and 10 days	July 1, 2015 - Carlos Carrasco (8⅔ IP before first hit)
San Diego Padres	Never (first MLB game played on April 8, 1969)			Joe Musgrove	Texas Rangers	April 9, 2021	52 years and 1 day	8 years, 10 months and 8 days	July 18, 1972 - Steve Arlin (8⅔ IP before first hit); July 9, 2011 - Aaron Harang/Josh Spence/Chad Qualls/Mike Adams/Luke Gregerson (8⅔ combined IP before first hit)
New York Mets	Never (first MLB game played on April 11, 1962)			Johan Santana	St. Louis Cardinals	June 1, 2012	50 years, 1 month and 21 days	28 years, 1 month and 25 days	September 24, 1975 - Tom Seaver (8⅔ IP before first hit)
Detroit Tigers	Jim Bunning	Boston Red Sox	July 20, 1958	Jack Morris	Chicago White Sox	April 7, 1984	25 years, 8 months and 18 days	9 months and 3 days	April 15, 1983 - Milt Wilcox (8⅔ IP before first hit; perfect game bid)
New York Yankees	Don Larsen	Brooklyn Dodgers	October 8, 1956	Dave Righetti	Boston Red Sox	July 4, 1983	26 years, 8 months and 26 days	13 years, 9 months and 14 days	July 17, 1959 - Ralph Terry (8⅓ IP before first hit); May 22, 1962 - Whitey Ford/Jim Coates (8⅓ combined IP before first hit)
Pittsburgh Pirates	Cliff Chambers	Boston Braves	May 6, 1951	Bob Moose	New York Mets	September 20, 1969	18 years, 4 months and 14 days	1 year and 2 days	May 26, 1959 - Harvey Haddix (12⅓ IP before first hit)
St. Louis Cardinals	Lou Warneke	Cincinnati Reds	August 30, 1941	Ray Washburn	San Francisco Giants	September 18, 1968	27 years and 19 days	4 years, 2 months and 28 days	August 6, 1953 - Harvey Haddix (8 IP before first hit)
Philadelphia Phillies	Johnny Lush	Brooklyn Superbas	May 1, 1906	Jim Bunning	New York Mets	June 21, 1964	58 years, 1 month and 20 days	39 years, 11 months and 4 days	June 5, 1915 - Grover Cleveland Alexander (8⅔ IP before first hit)
St. Louis Cardinals	Ted Breitenstein	Louisville Colonels	October 4, 1891	Jesse Haines	Boston Braves	July 17, 1924	32 years, 9 months and 13 days	16 years, 9 months and 27 days	September 9, 1911 - Gene Woodburn (8⅓ IP before first hit)
Pittsburgh Pirates	Never (first MLB game played on May 2, 1882)			Nick Maddox	Brooklyn Superbas	September 20, 1907	25 years, 4 months and 18 days	15 years, 1 month and 14 days	July 4, 1906 - Lefty Leifield (8 IP before first hit)
Boston Beaneaters	Never (first MLB game played on April 22, 1876)			Jack Stivetts	Brooklyn Grooms	August 6, 1892	16 years, 3 months and 15 days	16 years, 3 months and 15 days	No bid of 8+ IP before first hit during span

=== No-hitter pitched against ===
The longest active drought of a team having a no-hitter pitched against them is the Los Angeles Angels, who were last no-hit on September 11, 1999, 27 years, 2 months and 8 days ago.

The longest such drought in MLB history belongs to the Chicago Cubs, who had a span of 49 years, 10 months and 16 days between having a no-hitter pitched against them.

Team	Last no-hitter pitched against			Next no-hitter pitched against			Length of drought	Tenure of record	Longest 8+ IP no-hit bid before first hit during span
Team	Pitcher(s)	Team	Date of no-hitter	Pitcher(s)	Team	Date of no-hitter	Length of drought	Tenure of record	Longest 8+ IP no-hit bid before first hit during span
Los Angeles Angels	Eric Milton	Minnesota Twins	September 11, 1999	Active			27 years, 2 months and 8 days	3 years, 3 months and 10 days	August 16, 2015 - Justin Verlander (8 IP before first hit); July 19, 2019 - Mike Leake (8 IP before first hit; perfect game bid); August 24, 2024 - Bowden Francis (8 IP before first hit); May 18, 2026 - J.T. Ginn (8 IP before first hit)
Washington Nationals	David Cone	New York Yankees	July 18, 1999	Michael Lorenzen	Philadelphia Phillies	August 9, 2023	24 years and 22 days	1 month and 12 days	September 24, 2013 - Michael Wacha (8⅔ IP before first hit)
Oakland Athletics	Bob Milacki (6 IP); Mike Flanagan (1 IP); Mark Williamson (1 IP); Gregg Olson (1 IP)	Baltimore Orioles	July 13, 1991	Domingo German	New York Yankees	June 28, 2023	31 years, 11 months and 15 days	7 years, 11 months and 3 days	June 7, 2007 - Curt Schilling (8⅔ IP before first hit)
Chicago Cubs	Sandy Koufax	Los Angeles Dodgers	September 9, 1965	Cole Hamels	Philadelphia Phillies	July 25, 2015	49 years, 10 months and 16 days	12 years, 1 month and 14 days	September 24, 1975 - Tom Seaver (8⅔ IP before first hit)
New York Yankees	Hoyt Wilhelm	Baltimore Orioles	July 20, 1958	Roy Oswalt (1 IP); Pete Munro (2⅔ IP); Kirk Saarloos (1⅓ IP); Brad Lidge (2 IP); Octavio Dotel (1 IP); Billy Wagner (1 IP)	Houston Astros	June 11, 2003	44 years, 10 months and 22 days	26 years, 10 months and 2 days	April 14, 1967 - Billy Rohr (8⅔ IP before first hit); August 4, 1989 - Dave Stieb (8⅔ IP before first hit; perfect game bid)
Los Angeles Dodgers	Don Larsen	New York Yankees	October 8, 1956	John Candelaria	Pittsburgh Pirates	August 9, 1976	19 years, 10 months and 1 day	4 years, 11 months and 26 days	April 18, 1964 - Jim Maloney/John Tsitouris (8⅔ combined IP before first hit)
Pittsburgh Pirates	Sam Jones	Chicago Cubs	May 12, 1955	Bob Gibson	St. Louis Cardinals	August 14, 1971	16 years, 3 months and 2 days	4 years, 1 month and 27 days	No bid of 8+ IP before first hit during span
Atlanta Braves	Cliff Chambers	Brooklyn Superbas	May 6, 1951	Don Wilson	Houston Astros	June 18, 1967	16 years, 1 month and 12 days	3 years, 1 month and 26 days	May 26, 1959 - Harvey Haddix (12⅓ IP before first hit)
Cincinnati Reds	Lou Warneke	St. Louis Cardinals	August 30, 1941	Ken Johnson	Houston Colt .45s	April 23, 1964	22 years, 7 months and 24 days	3 years, 11 months and 8 days	July 23, 1955 - Jim Hearn (8⅓ IP before first hit)
St. Louis Cardinals	Hod Eller	Cincinnati Reds	May 11, 1919	Don Cardwell	Chicago Cubs	May 15, 1960	41 years and 4 days	7 years, 10 months and 26 days	No bid of 8+ IP before first hit during span
Chicago Cubs	Fred Toney	Cincinnati Reds	May 2, 1917	Carl Erskine	Brooklyn Dodgers	June 19, 1952	35 years, 1 month and 17 days	3 years, 9 months and 10 days	September 2, 1950 - Ewell Blackwell (8 IP before first hit)
New York Giants	Jimmy Lavender	Chicago Cubs	August 31, 1915	Rex Barney	Brooklyn Dodgers	September 9, 1948	33 years and 9 days	8 years, 4 months and 10 days	No bid of 8+ IP before first hit during span
Cincinnati Reds	Big Jeff Pfeffer	Boston Doves	May 8, 1907	Tex Carleton	Brooklyn Dodgers	April 30, 1940	32 years, 11 months and 22 days	20 years, 11 months and 19 days	May 2, 1917 - Hippo Vaughn (9⅓ IP before first hit)
St. Louis Cardinals	Mal Eason	Brooklyn Superbas	July 20, 1906	Hod Eller	Cincinnati Reds	May 11, 1919	12 years, 9 months and 21 days	1 year, 10 months and 18 days	June 5, 1915 - Grover Cleveland Alexander (8⅔ IP before first hit)
Washington Senators	Never (first MLB game played on April 26, 1901)			Babe Ruth (0 IP); Ernie Shore (9 IP)	Boston Red Sox	June 23, 1917	16 years, 1 month and 28 days	1 year and 7 days	May 14, 1914 - Jim Scott (9 IP before first hit)
Pittsburgh Pirates	Ted Breitenstein	Baltimore Orioles	April 22, 1898	Tom L. Hughes	Boston Braves	June 16, 1916	18 years, 1 month and 25 days	9 years, 1 month and 8 days	August 1, 1906 - Harry McIntire (11⅔ IP before first hit)
Cincinnati Reds	Cy Young	Cleveland Spiders	September 18, 1897	Big Jeff Pfeffer	Boston Braves	May 8, 1907	9 years, 7 months and 20 days	3 years, 7 months and 20 days	No bid of 8+ IP before first hit during span
Chicago Cubs	Never (first MLB game played on April 25, 1876)			Chick Fraser	Philadelphia Phillies	September 18, 1903	27 years, 4 months and 24 days	23 years and 30 days	September 18, 1888 - Ben Sanders (8⅓ IP before first hit; perfect game bid)
Boston Red Caps	Never (first MLB game played on April 22, 1876)			Larry Corcoran	Chicago White Stockings	August 19, 1880	4 years, 3 months and 28 days	4 years, 3 months and 28 days	No bid of 8+ IP before first hit during span

== Near no-hitters ==
Regulation games in which a pitcher or staff pitches less than nine full innings, or in which a hit is allowed in extra innings, are not recognized by MLB as no-hitters. However, before the rules were tightened in 1991, such games were recognized as official no-hitters.

=== Regulation no-hit losses ending in the middle of the ninth ===
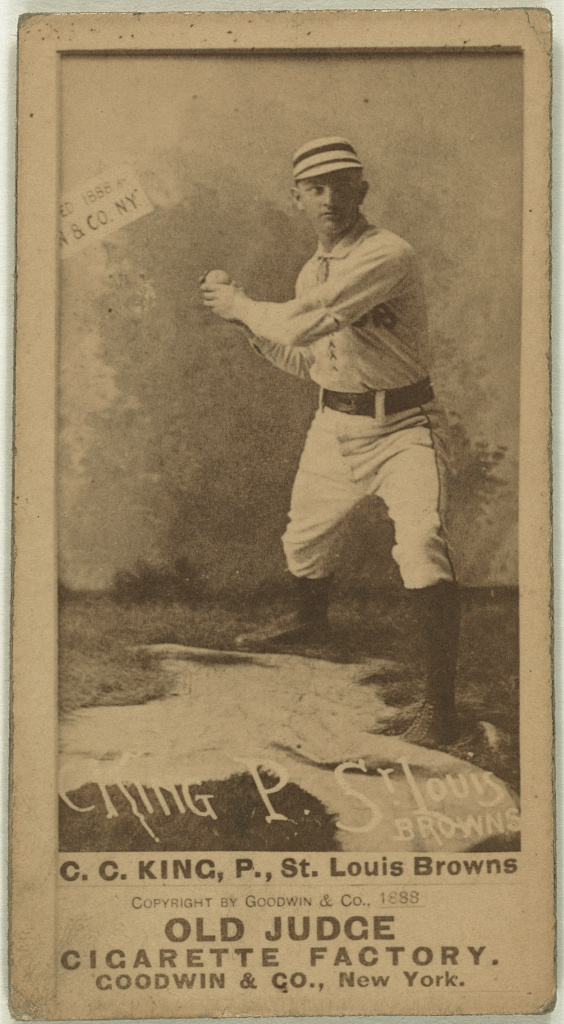
Silver King

Since the bottom of the ninth inning is not played if the team batting last already has a lead, the pitcher(s) of the team batting first can complete a full game without allowing a hit, but not be credited with an official no-hitter. The winning team may not need to bat in the bottom of the ninth due to runs scored by walks, errors, or anything else not involving hits, in which case the losing team's pitcher(s) will not be credited with an official no-hitter, because they pitched less than nine innings. This has happened only five times in major-league history.

Such games were recognized as no-hitters before 1991; however, MLB no longer recognizes such games, past or present, as no-hitters. They are still recognized by the Hall of Fame Museum in Cooperstown, NY and certain record books that are not directly affiliated with Major League Baseball. While in modern baseball the home team always bats last, the visiting team sometimes batted last in the early days of professional baseball.

==== Players' League ====
- June 21, 1890 – Silver King, Chicago Pirates 0 Brooklyn Ward's Wonders 1
  - Brooklyn's run scored on an error, sacrifice bunt, and fielder's choice in the seventh inning. Note that Chicago, the home team, opted to bat first in this game, as was allowed at the time; thus, Brooklyn did not bat in the bottom of the ninth.

==== National League ====
- May 15, 2022 – Hunter Greene (7.1 IP) and Art Warren (0.2 IP), Cincinnati Reds 0 Pittsburgh Pirates 1
  - Pirates' run scored on three walks (two given up by Greene) and a fielder's choice in the eighth inning.

==== American League ====
- July 1, 1990 – Andy Hawkins, New York Yankees 0 Chicago White Sox 4
  - White Sox' four runs scored on an error, stolen base, two walks, and two additional errors in the eighth inning.
- April 12, 1992 – Matt Young, Boston Red Sox 1 Cleveland Indians 2
  - Indians' first run scored in the first inning on a walk, two stolen bases, and an error; second run scored in the third inning on two walks, a fielder's choice, stolen base, and another fielder's choice.

==== Interleague play ====
- June 28, 2008 – Jered Weaver (6 IP) and José Arredondo (2 IP), Los Angeles Angels of Anaheim 0 Los Angeles Dodgers 1
  - Dodgers' run scored on an error, stolen base, and sacrifice fly in the fifth inning.

=== Shortened games ===
Under certain circumstances, if a game cannot continue because of the weather, darkness, or any other reason, but at least five innings have been completed, the result can stand as an officially completed game. No-hitters pitched under such circumstances were recognized before 1991 (although not generally in the same caliber as games that were played to their natural conclusion), but are no longer recognized by MLB as official no-hitters. In many instances, these games were shortened by rain, by darkness (in the era before lights), or due to timing constraints when teams needed to travel on regularly scheduled trains. Some games were scheduled for less than nine innings as part of a doubleheader, decided "by agreement" between managers prior to the start of the game (to avoid darkness or in consideration of travel schedules), or by league rule (2020–21 MLB rules because of pandemic restrictions).

Names listed in bold signify the pitcher was pitching a perfect game at the time the game was ended; such games are not recognized as official perfect games.

==== National League ====
- October 1, 1884 (6 innings) – Charlie Getzien, Detroit Wolverines 1 Philadelphia Phillies 0
  - Game called due to rain.
- October 7, 1885 (first game; 5 innings) – Dupee Shaw, Providence Grays 4 Buffalo Bisons 0
  - Both games of the doubleheader were scheduled for five innings.
- June 21, 1888 (6 innings) – George Van Haltren, Chicago White Stockings 1 Pittsburgh Alleghenys 0
  - Game called due to rain.
- September 27, 1888 (7 innings) – Ed Crane, New York Giants 3 Washington Nationals 0
  - Game called due to darkness.
- October 15, 1892 (second game; 5 innings) – Jack Stivetts, Boston Braves 4 Washington Senators 0
  - Game called "by agreement".
- September 23, 1893 (second game; 7 innings) – Elton Chamberlain, Cincinnati Reds 6 Boston Beaneaters 0
  - Game called due to darkness.
- June 2, 1894 (6 innings) – Ed Stein, Brooklyn Grooms 1 Chicago White Stockings 0
  - Game called due to rain.
- September 14, 1903 (second game; 5 innings) – Red Ames, New York Giants 5 St. Louis Cardinals 0
  - Game called due to darkness; major league debut for Ames.
- August 24, 1906 (second game; 7 innings) – Jake Weimer, Cincinnati Reds 1 Brooklyn Superbas 0
  - Game called "by agreement".
- September 24, 1906 (second game; 7 innings) – Stoney McGlynn, St. Louis Cardinals 1 Brooklyn Superbas 1
  - Game called due to darkness; first game of the doubleheader went 11 innings; Brooklyn run scored on a walk, stolen base, and sacrifice fly in the first inning. (Note: While such games ending in a tie are excluded from baseball standings and (usually) re-played at a later date, individual player statistics are counted.)
- September 26, 1906 (second game; 6 innings) – Lefty Leifield, Pittsburgh Pirates 8 Philadelphia Phillies 0
  - Game called due to darkness.
- August 11, 1907 (second game; 7 innings) – **Ed Karger**, St. Louis Cardinals 4 Boston Doves 0
  - Game called "by agreement".
- August 23, 1907 (second game; 5 innings) – Howie Camnitz, Pittsburgh Pirates 1 New York Giants 0
  - Game called "by agreement"; first game of the doubleheader went 10 innings.
- August 6, 1908 (first game; 6 innings) – Johnny Lush, St. Louis Cardinals 2 Brooklyn Superbas 0
  - Game called due to rain; second game of the doubleheader postponed.
- July 31, 1910 (second game; 7 innings) – King Cole, Chicago Cubs 4 St. Louis Cardinals 0
  - Game called so teams could catch trains (both teams next played in New York City).
- August 27, 1937 (first game; 8 innings) – Fred Frankhouse, Brooklyn Dodgers 5 Cincinnati Reds 0
  - Game called due to rain; second game of the doubleheader canceled.
- June 22, 1944 (second game; 5 innings) – Jim Tobin, Boston Braves 7 Philadelphia Phillies 0
  - Game called due to darkness.
- June 12, 1959 (5 innings) – Mike McCormick, San Francisco Giants 3 Philadelphia Phillies 0
  - Game called due to rain; McCormick allowed a single in the sixth inning, but as the game was called before that inning was completed, the game officially ended after five innings.
- September 26, 1959 (7 innings) – Sam Jones, San Francisco Giants 4 St. Louis Cardinals 0
  - Game called due to rain.
- April 21, 1984 (second game; 5 innings) – **David Palmer**, Montreal Expos 4 St. Louis Cardinals 0
  - Game called due to rain.
- September 24, 1988 (5 innings) – Pascual Pérez, Montreal Expos 1 Philadelphia Phillies 0
  - Game called due to rain.
- April 25, 2021 (second game; 7 innings) – Madison Bumgarner, Arizona Diamondbacks 7 Atlanta Braves 0
  - During the 2021 season, doubleheaders were scheduled for seven innings each for player safety reasons due to the COVID pandemic.

==== American League ====
- August 15, 1905 (5 innings) – Rube Waddell, Philadelphia Athletics 2 St. Louis Browns 0
  - Game called due to rain.
- May 26, 1907 (5 innings) – Ed Walsh, Chicago White Sox 8 New York Highlanders 1
  - Game called due to rain; New York's run scored on two walks and two wild pitches in the first inning.
- October 5, 1907 (second game; 5 innings) – **Rube Vickers**, Philadelphia Athletics 4 Washington Senators 0
  - Game called due to darkness.
- August 20, 1912 (second game; 6 innings) – Carl Cashion, Washington Senators 2 Cleveland Naps 0
  - Game called so Naps could catch an express train to Boston.
- August 25, 1924 (first game; 7 innings) – Walter Johnson, Washington Senators 2 St. Louis Browns 0
  - Game called due to rain; second game of the doubleheader postponed.
- August 5, 1940 (second game; 6 innings) – John Whitehead, St. Louis Browns 4 Detroit Tigers 0
  - Game called due to rain.
- August 6, 1967 (5 innings) – **Dean Chance**, Minnesota Twins 2 Boston Red Sox 0
  - Game called due to rain.
- July 12, 1990 (6 innings) – Mélido Pérez, Chicago White Sox 8 New York Yankees 0
  - Game called due to rain.
- October 1, 2006 (5 innings) – Devern Hansack, Boston Red Sox 9 Baltimore Orioles 0
  - Game called due to rain.
- July 7, 2021 (second game; 7 innings) – Collin McHugh (2.0 IP), Josh Fleming (2.2 IP), Diego Castillo (0.1 IP), Matt Wisler (1.0 IP), and Pete Fairbanks (1.0 IP), Tampa Bay Rays 4, Cleveland Indians 0
  - Second game of doubleheader with 2020–21 MLB pandemic player safety rule (see above) shortening doubleheaders to seven innings each in place.

==== American Association ====
- May 6, 1884 (6 innings) – Larry McKeon, Indianapolis Hoosiers 0 Cincinnati Red Stockings 0
- July 29, 1889 (second game; 7 innings) – Matt Kilroy, Baltimore Orioles 0 St. Louis Browns 0
- September 23, 1890 (7 innings) – George Nicol, St. Louis Browns 21 Philadelphia Athletics 2
- October 12, 1890 (8 innings) – Hank Gastright, Columbus Solons 6 Toledo Maumees 0

==== Union Association ====
- August 21, 1884 (8 innings) – Charlie Geggus, Washington Nationals 12 Wilmington Quicksteps 1
- October 5, 1884 (5 innings) – Charlie Sweeney (2 inn.) and Henry Boyle (3 inn.), St. Louis Maroons 0 St. Paul Saints 1

=== Nine-inning no-hitters broken up in extra innings ===
MLB previously recognized no-hitters when the only hits allowed occurred in extra innings, until the rules were tightened in 1991. They are still recognized by the Hall of Fame Museum in Cooperstown, NY and certain record books that are not directly affiliated with Major League Baseball. Names listed in bold signify the pitcher was pitching a perfect game through nine innings.

==== National League ====
- June 11, 1904 (12 innings) – Bob Wicker, Chicago Cubs 1 New York Giants 0
  - Wicker (winning pitcher) surrendered single with one out in 10th; only hit allowed.
- August 1, 1906 (13 innings) – Harry McIntire, Brooklyn Superbas 0 Pittsburgh Pirates 1
  - McIntire (losing pitcher) surrendered single with two out in 11th; allowed three more hits.
- April 15, 1909 (13 innings; Opening Day) – Red Ames, New York Giants 0 Brooklyn Superbas 3
  - Ames (losing pitcher) surrendered single with one out in 10th; allowed six more hits.
- May 2, 1917 (10 innings) – Hippo Vaughn, Chicago Cubs 0 Cincinnati Reds 1
  - Vaughn (losing pitcher) surrendered single with one out in 10th; allowed one more hit; known as "Double No-Hitter" prior to MLB rule change since the opposing pitcher threw 10-inning no-hitter—see entry in main list for Fred Toney.
- May 26, 1956 (11 innings) – Johnny Klippstein (7 inn.), Hersh Freeman (1 inn.) and Joe Black (3 inn.), Cincinnati Reds 1 Milwaukee Braves 2
  - Black (losing pitcher) surrendered double with two out in 10th; allowed two more hits.
- May 26, 1959 (13 innings) – **Harvey Haddix**, Pittsburgh Pirates 0 Milwaukee Braves 1
  - Haddix (losing pitcher) pitched 12 perfect innings; first base-runner was lead-off hitter in 13th, who reached on an error; followed by sacrifice bunt, intentional walk, and game-ending hit (ruled a one-run double rather than a three-run home run due to a base-running mistake).
- June 14, 1965 (11 innings) – Jim Maloney, Cincinnati Reds 0 New York Mets 1
  - Maloney (losing pitcher) surrendered lead-off home run in 11th; allowed one more hit.
- July 26, 1991 (10 innings) – Mark Gardner (9 inn.) and Jeff Fassero (0 inn.), Montreal Expos 0 Los Angeles Dodgers 1
  - Gardner (losing pitcher) surrendered leadoff single in 10th and allowed one more hit before being replaced; Fassero also allowed one hit.
- June 3, 1995 (10 innings) – **Pedro Martínez** (9 inn.) and Mel Rojas (1 inn.), Montreal Expos 1 San Diego Padres 0
  - Martinez (winning pitcher) pitched 9 perfect innings; first San Diego base-runner was from lead-off double surrendered by Martínez in 10th; Rojas relieved him and retired the next three batters, earning a save.
- August 23, 2017 (10 innings) – Rich Hill, Los Angeles Dodgers 0 Pittsburgh Pirates 1
  - Hill (losing pitcher) threw 9 no-hit innings and was perfect into the 9th before first base-runner reached on error; surrendered walk-off home run leading off the 10th inning. This is the only time on record that an extra-innings walk-off home run has broken up a no-hitter.

==== American League ====
- May 9, 1901 (10 innings) – Earl Moore, Cleveland Blues 2 Chicago White Sox 4
  - Moore (losing pitcher) surrendered lead-off single in 10th; allowed one more hit.
- August 30, 1910 (second game; 11 innings) – Tom Hughes, New York Highlanders 0 Cleveland Naps 5
  - Hughes (losing pitcher) surrendered single with one out in 10th; allowed six more hits.
- May 14, 1914 (10 innings) – Jim Scott, Chicago White Sox 0 Washington Senators 1
  - Scott (losing pitcher) surrendered lead-off single in 10th; allowed one more hit.
- September 18, 1934 (10 innings) – Bobo Newsom, St. Louis Browns 1 Boston Red Sox 2
  - Newsom (losing pitcher) surrendered single with two out in 10th; only hit allowed.
- April 23, 2022 (10 innings) – J. P. Feyereisen (2.0 IP), Javy Guerra (0.2 IP), Jeffrey Springs (2.0 IP), Jason Adam (1.1 IP), Ryan Thompson (1.0 IP), Andrew Kittredge (2.0 IP), and Matt Wisler (1.0 IP), Tampa Bay Rays 3 Boston Red Sox 2
  - Wisler (winning pitcher) surrendered leadoff triple in the 10th; allowed one more hit.

==== Interleague ====
- September 10, 2023 (13 innings) – Corbin Burnes (8.0 IP), Devin Williams (1.0 IP), Abner Uribe (1.0 IP), Joel Payamps (1.0 IP), Andrew Chafin (1.0 IP), and Hoby Milner (0.1 IP), Milwaukee Brewers (NL) 3 New York Yankees (AL) 4
  - Payamps surrendered a double with one out in the 11th; allowed two more hits.
