= List of Los Angeles Angels no-hitters =

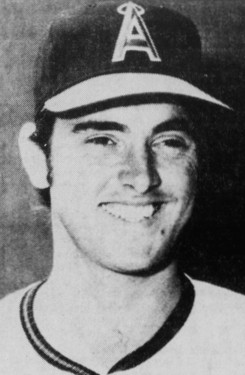
Nolan Ryan, who set an MLB record with seven career no-hitters, threw four while with the Angels

The Los Angeles Angels are a Major League Baseball franchise based in Anaheim, California near Los Angeles. Formed in 1961, they play in the American League West division. Also known in their early years as Los Angeles Angels (1961–1965), California Angels (1966–1996), and Anaheim Angels (1997–2004), pitchers for the Angels have thrown twelve no-hitters in franchise history. A no-hitter is officially recognized by Major League Baseball only "when a pitcher (or pitchers) allows no hits during the entire course of a game, which consists of at least nine innings", though one or more batters "may reach base via a walk, an error, a hit by pitch, a passed ball or wild pitch on strike three, or catcher's interference". No-hitters of less than nine complete innings were previously recognized by the league as official; however, several rule alterations in 1991 changed the rule to its current form. Mike Witt threw the only perfect game, a special subcategory of no-hitter, in Angels history on September 30, 1984. As defined by Major League Baseball, "in a perfect game, no batter reaches any base during the course of the game."

Bo Belinsky threw the first no-hitter in Angels history on May 5, 1962; the most recent no-hitter was thrown by Reid Detmers on May 10, 2022. Two left-handed starting pitchers have thrown no-hitters in franchise history. The longest interval between no-hitters was between the games pitched by Langston/Witt and Santana, encompassing more than 21 years from April 11, 1990 until July 27, 2011. Conversely, the shortest interval between no-hitters was between the games pitched by Nolan Ryan, encompassing two months from May 15, 1973 to July 15, 1973. The team has no-hit the Baltimore Orioles, doing so twice with Belinsky in 1962 and Nolan Ryan in 1975. There has been one no-hitter in which the team allowed at least a run. Ervin Santana's no-hitter on July 27, 2011 had an unearned run score on a wild pitch in the first inning, but then Santana settled down and completed his rare feat. The most baserunners allowed in a no-hitter was by Ryan (in 1974), who allowed eight. Six no-hitters were thrown at home, and four were thrown on the road. They threw one in April, three in May, one in June, three in July, and two in September. Of the 10 no-hitters, three have been won by a score of 1–0, more common than any other results. The largest margin of victory in a no-hitter was 13–0 win by Cole and Peña on July 12, 2019. The smallest margin of victory was 1–0 wins by Ryan in 1975, Mike Witt in 1984 and a combined no-hitter led by Langston in 1990.

The umpire is also an integral part of any no-hitter. The task of the umpire in a baseball game is to make any decision "which involves judgment, such as, but not limited to, whether a batted ball is fair or foul, whether a pitch is a strike or a ball, or whether a runner is safe or out… [the umpire's judgment on such matters] is final." Part of the duties of the umpire making calls at home plate includes defining the strike zone, which "is defined as that area over homeplate (sic) the upper limit of which is a horizontal line at the midpoint between the top of the shoulders and the top of the uniform pants, and the lower level is a line at the hollow beneath the kneecap." These calls define every baseball game and are therefore integral to the completion of any no-hitter. A different umpire presided over each of the franchise's ten no-hitters.

The manager is another integral part of any no-hitter. The tasks of the manager include determining the starting rotation as well as batting order and defensive lineup every game. Nine different managers have been involved in the franchise's eleven no-hitters.

== List of Angels no-hitters ==
| ¶ | Indicates a perfect game |
| £ | Pitcher was left-handed |
| * | Member of the National Baseball Hall of Fame and Museum |

| # | Date | Pitcher | Final score | Base- runners | Opponent | Catcher | Plate umpire | Manager | Notes | Ref |
|---|---|---|---|---|---|---|---|---|---|---|
| 1 | May 5, 1962 | Bo Belinsky^{£} | 2–0 | 7 | Baltimore Orioles | Buck Rodgers | Harry Schwarts | Bill Rigney | First no-hitter in franchise history; First Angels no-hitter at home; First left-handed pitcher to throw a no-hitter in franchise history | |
| 2 | July 3, 1970 | Clyde Wright^{£} | 4–0 | 3 | Oakland Athletics | Joe Azcue | Marty Springstead | Lefty Phillips | In a pre-game ceremony, Wright had been inducted into the NAIA Hall of Fame | |
| 3 | May 15, 1973 | Nolan Ryan* (1) | 3–0 | 3 | @ Kansas City Royals | Jeff Torborg | Jim Evans | Bobby Winkles (1) | First Angels no-hitter on the road; First right-handed pitcher to throw a no-hitter in franchise history; 1st of 7 no-hitters for Ryan | |
| 4 | July 15, 1973 | Nolan Ryan* (2) | 6–0 | 4 | @ Detroit Tigers | Art Kusnyer | Ron Luciano | Bobby Winkles (2) | 2nd of 7 no-hitters for Ryan; Shortest interval between no-hitters in franchise history; Pitched 7 innings of no-hit ball in next start, closest to tying Vander Meer's back-to-back no-hitters since Ewell Blackwell in 1947 | |
| 5 | September 28, 1974 | Nolan Ryan* (3) | 4–0 | 8 | Minnesota Twins | Tom Egan | Art Frantz | Dick Williams (1) | 3rd of 7 no-hitters for Ryan; Most baserunners allowed in an Angels no-hitter | |
| 6 | June 1, 1975 | Nolan Ryan* (4) | 1–0 | 5 | Baltimore Orioles | Ellie Rodriguez | Hank Morgenweck | Dick Williams (2) | 4th of 7 no-hitters for Ryan; Smallest margin of victory in an Angels no-hitter (tie) | |
| 7 | September 30, 1984 | Mike Witt^{¶} | 1–0 | 0 | @ Texas Rangers | Bob Boone | Bruce Froemming | John McNamara | Final game of season; First and only perfect game in Angels history and 11th in MLB history; Smallest margin of victory in an Angels no-hitter (tie); Latest calendar date of an Angels no-hitter | |
| 8 | April 11, 1990 | Mark Langston^{£} (7 IP); Mike Witt (2 IP) | 1–0 | 5 | Seattle Mariners | Lance Parrish | Vic Voltaggio | Doug Rader | Smallest margin of victory in an Angels no-hitter (tie); Game 3 of season; Earliest calendar date of an Angels no-hitter | |
| 9 | July 27, 2011 | Ervin Santana | 3–1 | 2 | @ Cleveland Indians | Bobby Wilson | Ted Barrett | Mike Scioscia (1) | First Angels no-hitter while allowing a run; Santana's first career win against Cleveland; First no-hitter at Progressive Field (formerly Jacobs Field) | |
| 10 | May 2, 2012 | Jered Weaver | 9–0 | 2 | Minnesota Twins | Chris Iannetta | Mark Carlson | Mike Scioscia (2) | | |
| 11 | July 12, 2019 | Taylor Cole (2 IP); Félix Peña (7 IP) | 13–0 | 1 | Seattle Mariners | Dustin Garneau | Paul Nauert | Brad Ausmus | Franchise record for largest margin of victory in a no-hitter; Whole team wore jerseys bearing the name "Skaggs" and number 45, to honor Tyler Skaggs, who had died just a few days prior. | |
| 12 | May 10, 2022 | Reid Detmers | 12–0 | 2 | Tampa Bay Rays | Chad Wallach | Ryan Blakney | Joe Maddon | Most recent no-hitter in franchise history; This was only Detmers' eleventh major league start.; Youngest Angels pitcher to throw a no-hitter. | |

== See also ==
- List of Major League Baseball no-hitters
