= List of Kansas City Royals no-hitters =

The Kansas City Royals are a Major League Baseball franchise based in Kansas City, Missouri. Formed in 1969, they play in the American League Central division. Pitchers for the Royals have thrown 4 no-hitters in franchise history. A no-hitter is officially recognized by Major League Baseball only "when a pitcher (or pitchers) allows no hits during the entire course of a game, which consists of at least nine innings", though batters "may reach base via a walk, an error, a hit by pitch, a passed ball or wild pitch on strike three, or catcher's interference." No-hitters of less than nine complete innings were previously recognized by the league as official; however, several rule alterations in 1991 changed the rule to its current form. No perfect games, a special subcategory of no-hitter, have been thrown in Royals history. As defined by Major League Baseball, "in a perfect game, no batter reaches any base during the course of the game."

The umpire is also an integral part of any no-hitter. The task of the umpire in a baseball game is to make any decision "which involves judgment, such as, but not limited to, whether a batted ball is fair or foul, whether a pitch is a strike or a ball, or whether a runner is safe or out… [the umpire's judgment on such matters] is final." Part of the duties of the umpire making calls at home plate includes defining the strike zone, which "is defined as that area over homeplate (sic) the upper limit of which is a horizontal line at the midpoint between the top of the shoulders and the top of the uniform pants, and the lower level is a line at the hollow beneath the kneecap." These calls define every baseball game and are therefore integral to the completion of any no-hitter.

The manager is another integral part of any no-hitter. The tasks of the manager include determining the starting rotation as well as batting order and defensive lineup every game.

== No-hitters ==
¶	Indicates a perfect game
£	Pitcher was left-handed
*	Member of the National Baseball Hall of Fame and Museum

#	Date	Pitcher	Final score	Base- runners	Opponent	Catcher	Plate umpire	Manager	Notes	Ref
1	April 27, 1973	Steve Busby (1)	3–0	6	@ Detroit Tigers	Fran Healy (1)	John Rice	Jack McKeon (1)	First no-hitter in franchise history; First Royals no-hitter on the road; First right-handed pitcher to throw a no-hitter in franchise history; First no-hitter by a pitcher who did not come to bat the entire game, under the American League's new designated hitter rule	
2	June 19, 1974	Steve Busby (2)	3–0	1	@ Milwaukee Brewers	Fran Healy (2)	Joe Brinkman	Jack McKeon (2)	Only baserunner was a walk in the second inning.	
3	May 14, 1977	Jim Colborn	6–0	2	Texas Rangers	Darrell Porter	Bill Deegan	Whitey Herzog	First Royals no-hitter at home	
4	August 26, 1991	Bret Saberhagen	7–0	3	Chicago White Sox	Brent Mayne	Ted Hendry	Hal McRae	Most recent no-hitter in franchise history	

== See also ==
- List of Major League Baseball no-hitters
