= Nick Maddox =

American baseball player (1886–1954)

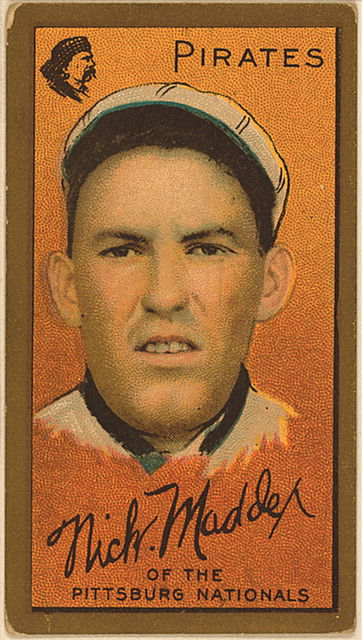
- Pitcher
- Born: November 9, 1886; Govanstown, Maryland, U.S.
- Died: November 27, 1954 (aged 68); Pittsburgh, Pennsylvania, U.S.
- Batted: Left Threw: Right

MLB debut
- September 13, 1907, for the Pittsburgh Pirates

Last MLB appearance
- September 12, 1910, for the Pittsburgh Pirates

MLB statistics
- Win–loss record: 43–20
- Earned run average: 2.29
- Strikeouts: 193
- Stats at Baseball Reference

Teams
- Pittsburgh Pirates (1907–1910)

Career highlights and awards
- World Series champion (1909); Pitched a no-hitter on September 20, 1907

Nicholas Maddox (November 9, 1886 – November 27, 1954) was an American professional baseball pitcher. He played in Major League Baseball for the Pittsburgh Pirates from 1907 through 1910. Maddox is one of the few pitchers to throw a no-hitter in his rookie season.

== Personal life ==
Maddox was born in Govanstown, Maryland as Nicholas Duffy on November 9, 1886. His father was John Duffy. By 1900, he was identified on U.S. Census documents as Nicholas Maddox and living with the Maddox family in Govanston.

He died on November 27, 1954, in Pittsburgh, Pennsylvania.

== Playing career ==
Maddox pitched a 4-0 shutout in his major league debut against the St. Louis Cardinals. A week later, he threw a no-hitter on September 20, 1907, defeating the Brooklyn Superbas 2–1 at Pittsburgh's Exposition Park.

Maddox is one of the youngest pitchers to throw a no-hitter in the majors, older than only Johnny Lush in 1906 and Amos Rusie in 1891. Maddox was the last Pirate to win his first four career starts (in 1907) until the feat was matched by Gerrit Cole in 2013. William F. Kirk of the New York American in 1908 called Maddox "a well formed youth with a face like a dried apple."

The next no-hitter thrown by a Pirate was by Cliff Chambers in 1951. The next no-hit game to occur in Pittsburgh happened in 1971, when Bob Gibson of the Cardinals no-hit the Pirates at Three Rivers Stadium; John Candelaria became the next Pirate pitcher to do so in Pittsburgh in 1976. The Pirates' home stadium in between, Forbes Field, had not witnessed a no-hitter in its 61-year (mid-1909–mid-1970) history.

After his rookie season, Maddox spent two more years with the Pirates as a starting pitcher. He won Game 3 of the 1909 World Series, throwing six scoreless innings to start the game before completing an 8–6 win over the Detroit Tigers. Babe Adams won the other three World Series games for Pittsburgh. Maddox finished his career in 1910 as a relief pitcher. In his career, he had 43 wins, 20 losses, and a 2.29 earned run average.

== See also ==
- List of Major League Baseball no-hitters

Preceded by Big Jeff Pfeffer	No-hitter pitcher September 20, 1907	Succeeded by Cy Young
