= Big Jeff Pfeffer =

American baseball player (1882–1954)

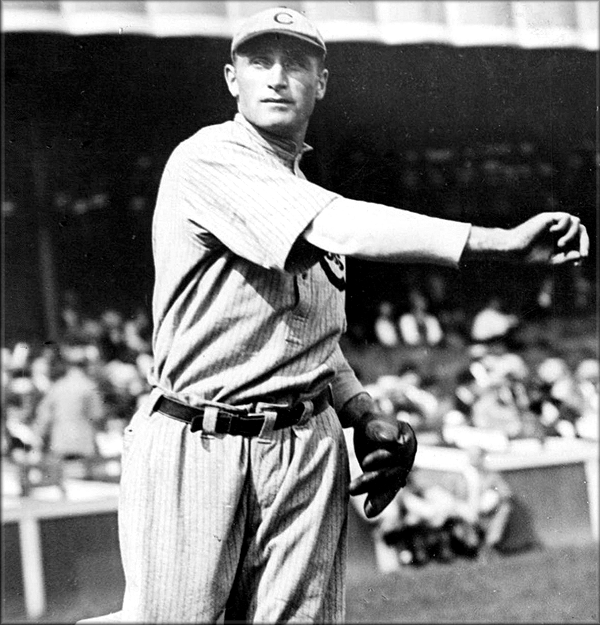
- Pitcher
- Born: March 31, 1882; Champaign, Illinois, U.S.
- Died: December 19, 1954 (aged 72); Kankakee, Illinois, U.S.
- Batted: Right Threw: Right

MLB debut
- April 15, 1905, for the Chicago Cubs

Last MLB appearance
- October 9, 1911, for the Boston Rustlers

MLB statistics
- Win–loss record: 31–39
- Earned run average: 3.30
- Strikeouts: 317
- Stats at Baseball Reference

Teams
- Chicago Cubs (1905); Boston Beaneaters/Doves (1906–1908); Chicago Cubs (1910); Boston Rustlers (1911)

Career highlights and awards
- Pitched a no-hitter on May 8, 1907

Francis Xavier "Big Jeff" Pfeffer (March 31, 1882 – December 19, 1954) was an American Major League pitcher from 1905 to 1911. He threw a no-hitter in 1907.

Pfeffer was born, and grew up, in Illinois, to a devout Catholic family. He was the seventh of ten children. His eldest sister Rose became a religious sister at the Sisters of Providence in Terre Haute, Indiana where she received the name Sister Mary Gervase. His younger brother was Jeff Pfeffer.

Pfeffer attended the University of Illinois. He made his MLB debut on April 15, 1905 for the Chicago Cubs and had a 4-4 record for them that season. He missed out on the 1906 World Series, going to Boston, where he had his most active season with a record of 13-22 for the 1906 season. He finished second in the National League that season in complete games and strikeouts.

Early the following season, Pfeffer pitched a no-hitter on May 8, 1907, with the Boston Doves defeating Cincinnati 6-0.

== See also ==
- List of Major League Baseball no-hitters

Achievements
Preceded by Mal Eason	No-hitter pitcher May 8, 1907	Succeeded by Nick Maddox
