= Roy Halladay's perfect game =

2010 baseball game in Florida, U.S.

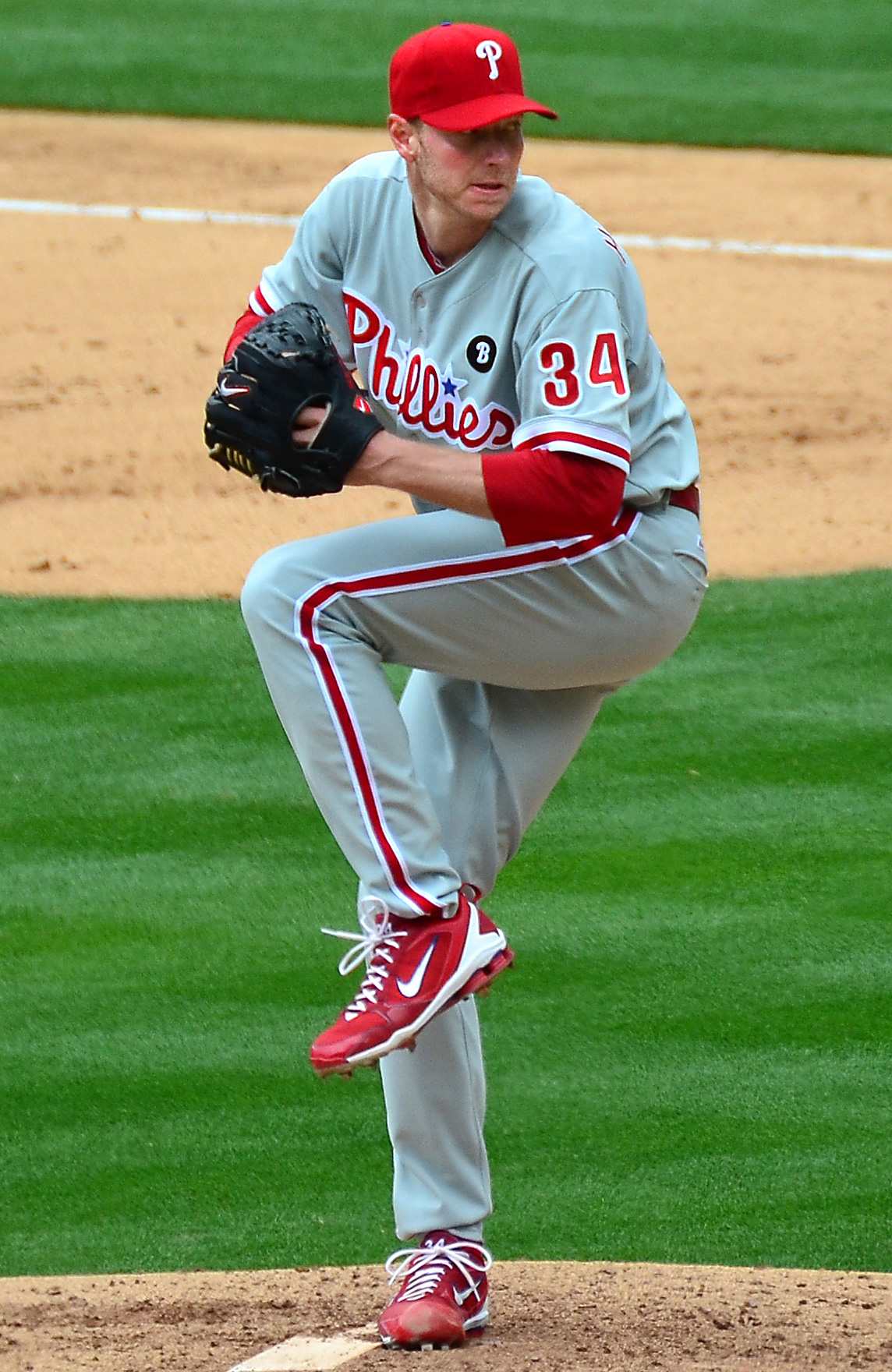
- Halladay in 2011
Philadelphia Phillies	Florida Marlins
1	0
	1	2	3	4	5	6	7	8	9	R	H	E
Philadelphia Phillies	0	0	1	0	0	0	0	0	0	1	7	0
Florida Marlins	0	0	0	0	0	0	0	0	0	0	0	1
- Date: May 29, 2010
- Venue: Sun Life Stadium
- City: Miami, Florida
- Managers: Charlie Manuel (Philadelphia Phillies); Fredi González (Florida Marlins)
- Umpires: HP: Mike DiMuro; 1B: Tim Welke; 2B: Jim Reynolds; 3B: Bill Welke
- Attendance: 25,086
- Television: Comcast SportsNet Philadelphia
- TV announcers: Tom McCarthy (play-by-play); Chris Wheeler (color commentary)

On May 29, 2010, Roy Halladay of the Philadelphia Phillies pitched the twentieth perfect game in Major League Baseball history, against the Florida Marlins in Sun Life Stadium. He retired all 27 batters, striking out 11. This was the first time in the modern era that two pitchers (Dallas Braden of the Oakland Athletics being the other) threw perfect games in the same month and that multiple perfect games had been achieved in the same season.

== Background ==
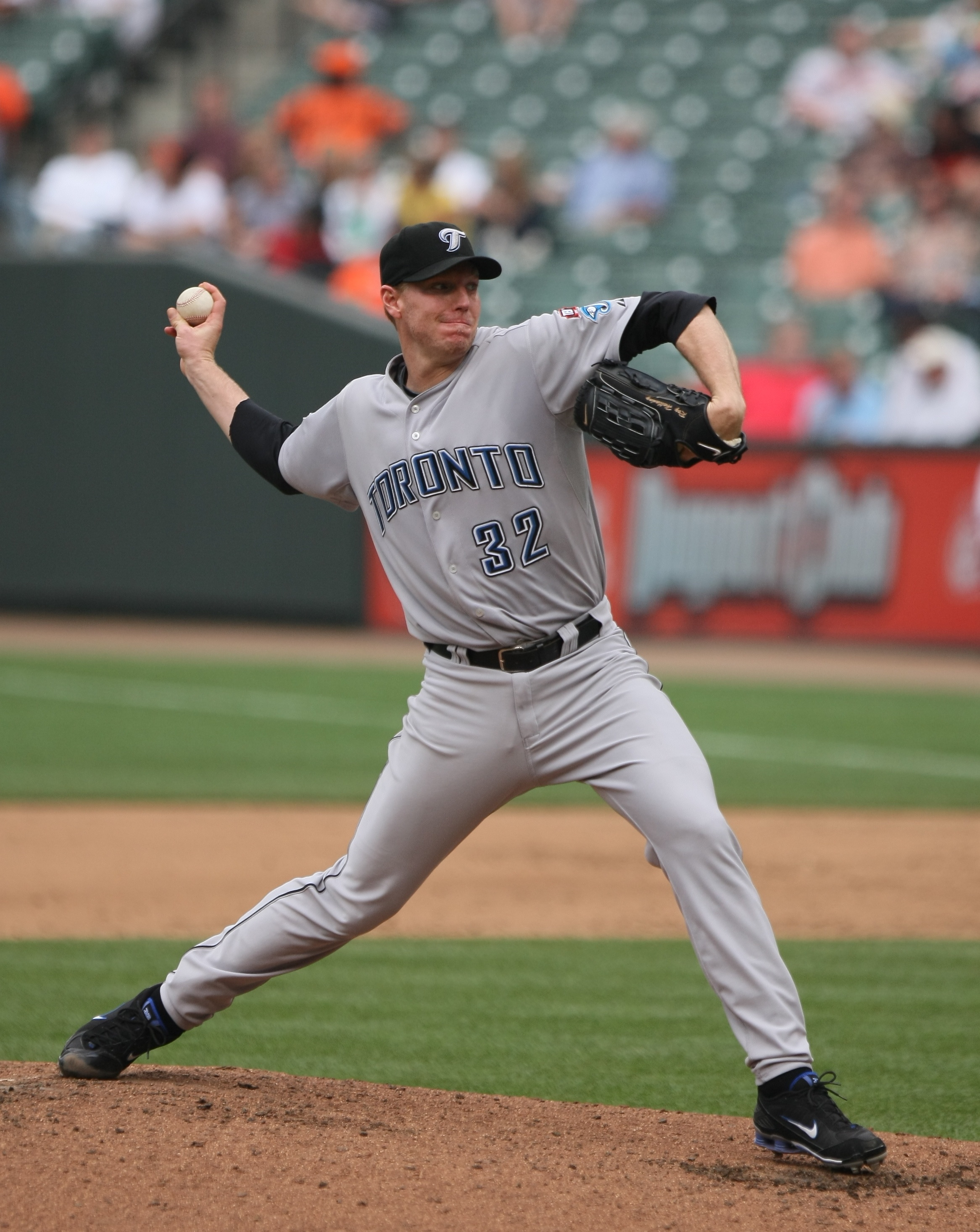
Roy Halladay with the Toronto Blue Jays

=== Halladay's early career ===
Roy Halladay's rookie season in 1999 featured 3.92 ERA in 149 1/3 innings for the Toronto Blue Jays. In his second year, he finished with an ERA of 10.64, the worst by any pitcher who tossed 50 innings or more. He improved from this dismal performance, and he played 12 seasons for the Toronto Blue Jays, in which time he averaged 17 wins per season, made six all-star teams and, in 2003, won a Cy Young Award. In his second major league start, on September 27, 1998, he carried a no-hitter into the 9th inning against the Detroit Tigers before giving up a two-out home run to Bobby Higginson. Halladay was traded to the Phillies for a package of prospects following the 2009 season.

=== 2010 season ===
On Opening Day, Halladay pitched seven innings while giving up a run against the Washington Nationals in his first game with the Phillies. He had nine strikeouts and allowed six hits. He helped himself by driving in his second career RBI and earned his first win of the season. He followed this start with a complete game on April 11 against the Houston Astros, giving up one unearned run while striking out eight and not giving up any walks in the Phillies' 2–1 victory.

Halladay pitched his first shutout in the National League, against the Atlanta Braves on April 21, becoming the first pitcher to reach four wins in the 2010 season. On May 1, Halladay pitched his second shutout of the season, limiting division rival New York Mets to three hits and striking out six.

== Game summary ==
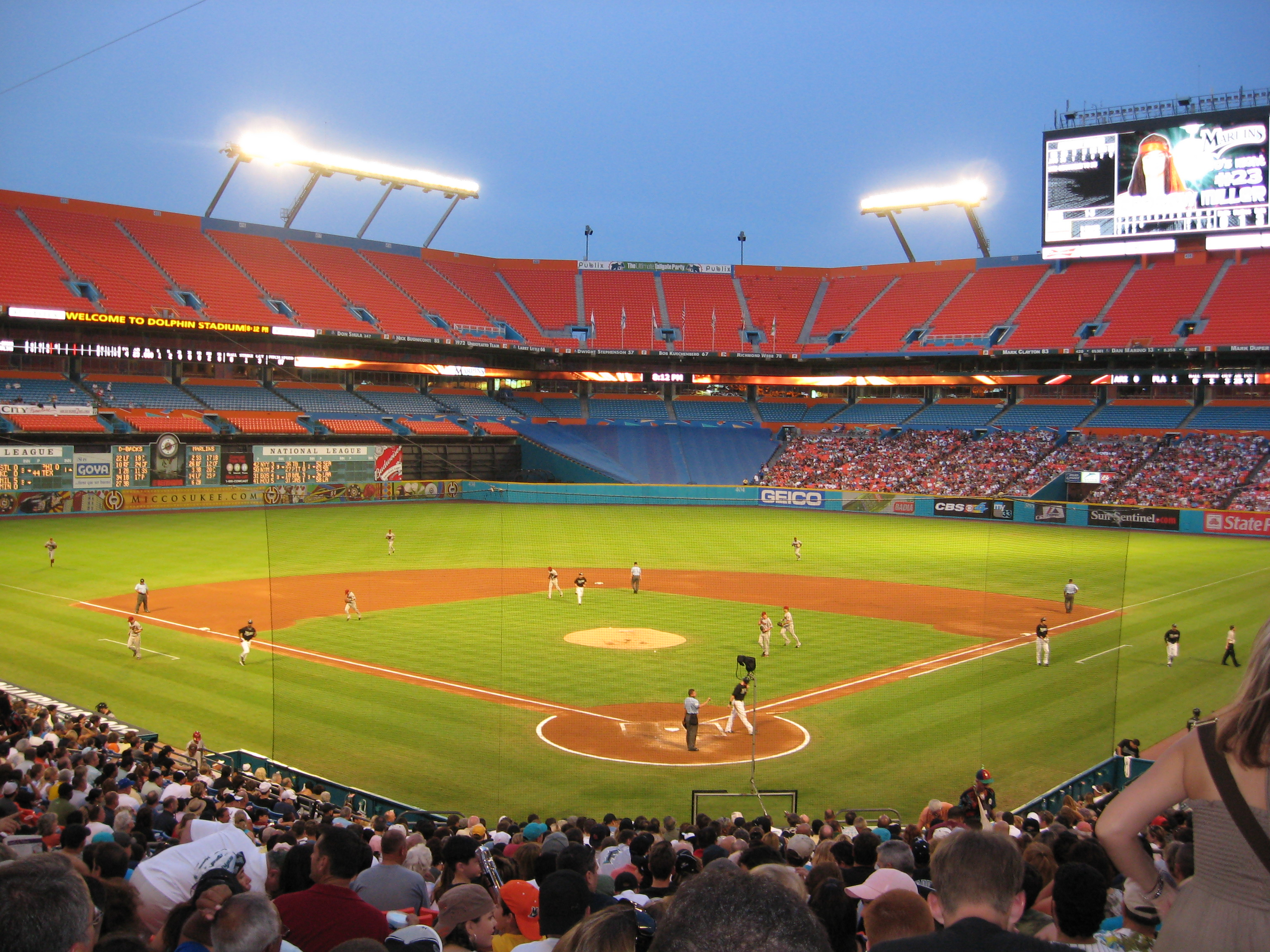
Roy Halladay pitched his perfect game at Sun Life Stadium.

The Philadelphia Phillies–Florida Marlins game began at 7:13 p.m. on May 29, 2010, to a crowd of 25,086 at Sun Life Stadium in Miami. The home plate umpire was Mike DiMuro, the first base umpire was Tim Welke, the second base umpire was Jim Reynolds, and the third base umpire was Bill Welke. Roy Halladay pitched the 20th perfect game in MLB history, retiring all 27 batters, and allowing no hits, no runs, and no errors. Although he is known as a ground ball pitcher, he struck out 11, his most of the year and the most by a Phillies pitcher at that point in the season. The opposing pitcher, Josh Johnson, allowed seven hits, one walk, and an unearned run in seven innings. The unearned run came in the top of the third, when Chase Utley's line drive bounced off the glove of Florida center fielder Cameron Maybin, allowing Wilson Valdez to score from first. This was the only run scored in the game.

Halladay's first pitch came at 7:17 pm, a called strike to Chris Coghlan off a 92 m.p.h. fastball on the outside corner. He threw 19 pitches in the first inning, his most of the night, and needed no more than 12 in any other inning except the seventh. In total, he threw 115 pitches, 72 for strikes. Halladay worked his way out of seven three-ball counts and six full counts, and credited the effectiveness of his sinker for his success. Of his 11 strikeouts, four came by way of sinkers.

In the bottom of the ninth, pinch hitter Mike Lamb flied out deep to Shane Victorino in center field for the first out. The ball would have been a home run in many other ballparks, but did not carry out of Sun Life Stadium's cavernous center field. Halladay thought he had lost the perfect game when the ball was initially struck. Victorino later commented on flagging the ball down, "I was going to do whatever it took." For the second out, Wes Helms, another pinch hitter, struck out looking – the sixth batter to do so. In the game-ending play, Ronny Paulino was thrown a 1–2 curveball and hit a hard chopper to Juan Castro at third base; Castro reached wide to his left to grab the ball, spun and threw to first base to preserve the perfect game. It was the second such play made by Castro in the game. Castro had been chosen to start at third base over Greg Dobbs at the start of the game due to Dobbs's two-run error in Halladay's previous start.

Halladay praised catcher Carlos Ruiz:

I can't say enough about the job that Ruiz did tonight, really. I felt like he was calling a great game up until the fourth or fifth, and at that point, I just felt like I'd let him take over and go with him. He did a great job. Like I said, it was kind of a no-brainer for me. I'd just go out, see the glove and hit it.

Halladay only shook off Ruiz once the entire game.

Halladay became the 10th pitcher in Phillies history to hurl a no-hitter; Jim Bunning's perfect game in 1964 was the only other time a Phillies pitcher tossed a perfect game. In addition, this was the eighth perfect game in National League history, the last being Randy Johnson's in 2004. This was the first time in the modern era that two pitchers—Dallas Braden and Halladay—had thrown perfect games in the same month and that multiple perfect games had been achieved in the same season. The twenty days between Braden's perfect game and Halladay's was the shortest span between two perfect games since 1880.

Halladay pitched his perfect game on the same night the Philadelphia Flyers played the Chicago Blackhawks in Game 1 of the Stanley Cup Finals. The opening face-off at the United Center in Chicago took place an hour after the Phillies–Marlins game began, resulting in many Phillies fans and media there missing the perfect game due to the hockey game, which the Flyers lost 6–5.

== Statistics ==
=== Line score ===
Team	1	2	3	4	5	6	7	8	9	R	H	E
Philadelphia Phillies (28–20)	0	0	1	0	0	0	0	0	0	1	7	0
Florida Marlins (24–26)	0	0	0	0	0	0	0	0	0	0	0	1
WP: Roy Halladay (7–3) LP: Josh Johnson (5–2)

=== Box score ===
Philadelphia	AB	R	H	RBI	BB	SO	AVG
Shane Victorino, CF	4	0	1	0	0	0	.257
Wilson Valdez, SS	4	1	2	0	0	1	.262
Chase Utley, 2B	4	0	0	0	0	0	.276
Ryan Howard, 1B	3	0	0	0	1	1	.291
Jayson Werth, RF	4	0	0	0	0	2	.302
Raúl Ibañez, LF	4	0	0	0	0	1	.247
Juan Castro, 3B	4	0	2	0	0	0	.265
Carlos Ruiz, C	4	0	2	0	0	0	.298
Roy Halladay, P	3	0	0	0	0	2	.111
Totals	34	1	7	0	1	7	.205

BATTING

- 2B: Valdez, W (6, Johnson, Jo); Castro, Ju (5, Johnson, Jo).
- TB: Ruiz 3; Castro, Ju 3; Victorino; Valdez, W 3.
- Runners left in scoring position, 2 out: Howard; Halladay; Ibanez.
- GIDP: Valdez, W.
- Team RISP: 1-for-6.
- Team LOB: 7.

Philadelphia	IP	H	R	ER	BB	SO	HR	ERA
Roy Halladay (W, 7–3)	9	0	0	0	0	11	0	1.99
Totals	9	0	0	0	0	11	0	0.00

Florida	AB	R	H	RBI	BB	SO	AVG
Chris Coghlan, LF	3	0	0	0	0	2	.216
Gaby Sánchez, 1B	3	0	0	0	0	1	.268
Hanley Ramírez, SS	3	0	0	0	0	2	.297
Jorge Cantú, 3B	3	0	0	0	0	1	.287
Dan Uggla, 2B	3	0	0	0	0	2	.267
Cody Ross, RF	3	0	0	0	0	0	.301
Brett Hayes, C	2	0	0	0	0	1	.250
Mike Lamb, PH	1	0	0	0	0	0	.200
Cameron Maybin, CF	2	0	0	0	0	0	.227
Wes Helms, PH	1	0	0	0	0	1	.293
Josh Johnson, P	2	0	0	0	0	1	.190
Ronny Paulino, PH	1	0	0	0	0	0	.308
Totals	27	0	0	0	0	11	.000

FIELDING

- E: Maybin (2, fielding).
- DP: Uggla-Sanchez, G.

Florida	IP	H	R	ER	BB	SO	HR	ERA
Josh Johnson (L, 5–2)	7	7	1	0	1	6	0	2.19
Clay Hensley	1	0	0	0	0	1	0	1.35
Leo Núñez	1	0	0	0	0	0	0	2.18
Totals	9	7	1	0	1	7	0	0.00

=== Other information ===
- IBB: Howard (by Johnson, Jo).
- Pitches-strikes: Halladay 115–72; Johnson, Jo 121–71; Hensley 11–6; Oviedo 11–8.
- Groundouts-flyouts: Halladay 8–4; Johnson, Jo 7–3; Hensley 0–2; Oviedo 2–1.
- Batters faced: Halladay 27; Johnson, Jo 29; Hensley 3; Oviedo 3.
- Umpires: HP: Mike DiMuro; 1B: Tim Welke; 2B: Jim Reynolds; 3B: Bill Welke.
- Weather: 85 °F (29 °C), partly cloudy.
- Wind: 12 mph, in from RF.
- Time: 2:13.
- Attendance: 35,418.
- Venue: Sun Life Stadium.

== Final broadcasting calls ==
After the death of longtime sports commentator Harry Kalas in 2009, Tom McCarthy took over as the Phillies' play-by-play television announcer, with Chris Wheeler serving alongside him as a color commentator. During the Comcast SportsNet Philadelphia television broadcast, McCarthy mentioned that the game was a no-hitter after 7 2/3 innings, but did not say "perfect game" until there was one out remaining. McCarthy said later that he did not "subscribe to the jinx part of it", referring to the notion that saying "no-hitter" or "perfect game" while a game is in progress will break the potential record, but that rather he and Wheeler were occupied with the other events of the game. As it became more likely that Halladay was going to pitch a perfect game, McCarthy began scripting what he would say for the final call; he wanted to mention that it was the 20th overall perfect game in baseball history and the second in Phillies history.

Scott Franzke and Larry Andersen were sitting in the booth next to McCarthy and Wheeler, narrating the game for radio. Unlike television broadcasts, radio play-by-play announcers like Franzke did not subscribe to the superstition of refraining to mention a potential no-hitter or perfect game. Franzke said afterwards, "If they're listening on the radio, there's a 99 percent certainty that they're in their car. They're not looking at a stat box or a line score ... You have to mention it." As the game approached its end, Franzke was attempting to look up a list of perfect games, but he had trouble with his laptop. Ultimately, he did not use the list in his final call, saying, "A perfect game for Roy Halladay! Twenty-seven up and 27 down!"

While the game was being played, many Phillies fans were also following the first game of the 2010 Stanley Cup Finals between the Philadelphia Flyers and the Chicago Blackhawks on NBC, or had chosen to watch the hockey game instead of the baseball game. They came to know about the perfect game from Mike Emrick, Eddie Olczyk, and Pierre McGuire when the network replayed the final out during the second period. As a result of the timing, Comcast SportsNet Philadelphia decided to rebroadcast the game two nights later, though it happened on the same day the Flyers played Game 2 of the Stanley Cup Finals.

For the Marlins, Rich Waltz called the play on FS Florida, while radio broadcaster Glenn Geffner called the play on WAXY, the Marlins radio station.

== Aftermath ==
=== Post-game celebrations ===
Halladay's response to the postgame celebrations was understated, as was typical for the pitcher. He received a standing ovation when he returned to the clubhouse and proceeded to thank catcher Carlos Ruiz for calling the game. First baseman Ryan Howard retrieved the game ball from the final out to give to Halladay, while the Marlins presented him with the plate from the pitcher's mound. The following day, although he was not pitching, Halladay woke up early and went to the ballpark for his typical exercise routine.

Cito Gaston, Halladay's former manager when he was a member of the Blue Jays, attempted to call Halladay to congratulate him after the perfect game, but said that the media frenzy prevented him from picking up the phone. A reporter joked to Gaston that Halladay was likely exercising, as he often did in his free time. Several other members of the Blue Jays organization offered their congratulations to their former teammate. General manager Alex Anthopoulos found out about the feat when he was attending a wedding, and received a number of congratulations himself. Some Blue Jays, like reliever Casey Janssen, told reporters that they would offer Halladay in-person congratulations when the team came to Citizens Bank Park the next month. Halladay also received a congratulatory phone call from Joe Biden, a lifelong Phillies fan and then–Vice President of the United States.

Sun Life Stadium, which had a capacity of just over 36,000, had around 10,000 tickets still available from Halladay's perfect game. The following day, the Marlins began selling these unused perfect game tickets as memorabilia, for the same price as the game would have cost to attend.

=== Armando Galarraga's near-perfect game ===
On June 2, 2010, Armando Galarraga of the Detroit Tigers retired the first 26 batters before the 27th batter reached base on an errant call by first base umpire Jim Joyce. Had Galarraga's game been correctly called, the four-day span since Halladay's perfect game would have broken that 130-year-old record, and marked the only time that three consecutive no-hitters had been perfect games, the only time that three perfect games had occurred in one season, the only time that three perfect games had occurred in a shorter span than a month, the only time four perfect games had occurred in a span shorter than a year, and the only time that four perfect games had occurred within a stretch of five no-hitters.

=== Commemorative watch ===
After pitching his perfect game, Halladay commissioned around 60 Baume & Mercier wrist watches that he subsequently gifted to all active roster members of the Phillies, as well as the coaching staff, all clubhouse personnel (including at least one batboy), training and video staff, and public relations officials for the team. Each watch was personalized, with the name of the recipient engraved on the back, and an inscription on the boxes reading, "We did it together. Thanks, Roy Halladay." Halladay enlisted the help of Frank Coppenbarger, the Phillies' director of team travel and clubhouse services, to help compile the list of recipients. In addition to those associated with the Phillies, Halladay's family, his wife's family, his agent, Blue Jays scout Bus Campbell, and sport psychologist Harvey Dorfman all received commemorative perfect game watches.

=== Postseason no-hitter ===
On September 27, 2010, Halladay pitched a complete game shutout to defeat the Washington Nationals 8–0 and lead the Phillies to their fourth consecutive National League (NL) East championship title. When the Phillies played the Cincinnati Reds in the 2010 National League Division Series, Halladay was called to start Game 1, his first career postseason appearance. He proceeded to throw 104 pitches in a no-hitter, giving up one walk to Jay Bruce in the fifth inning. Halladay also contributed offensively to the game, with an RBI single in the second inning. Halladay was only the second pitcher in MLB history to throw a postseason no-hitter, following Don Larsen's perfect game at the 1956 World Series, and he was the first pitcher to no-hit in both the regular season and the postseason. He was also the fifth pitcher in MLB history to throw two no-hitters in the same season, and the first since Nolan Ryan in 1973. Halladay's postseason effort was the first no-hitter in the history of Citizens Bank Park, and it was the first time that the Phillies had no-hit the Reds since Rick Wise pitched in 1971. The Phillies swept the Reds in three games and advanced to the 2010 National League Championship Series, where they were defeated in six games by the San Francisco Giants.

=== Legacy ===
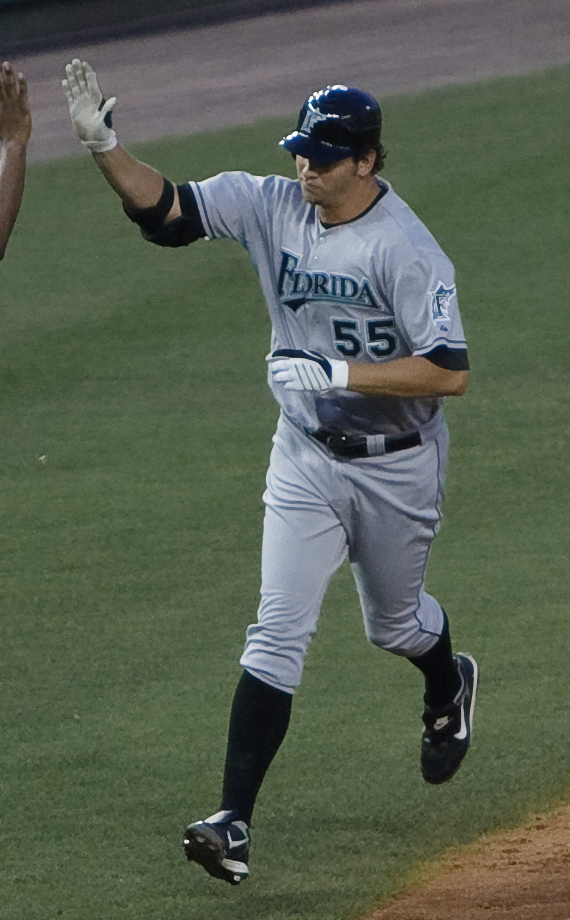
Josh Johnson, who pitched opposite Halladay during his perfect game, would face the pitcher several more times in their respective careers, and maintained a respect for Halladay.

Halladay's perfect game came during a dominant season for pitchers across MLB. By June 14, 2010, 24 starting pitchers had posted an earned run average (ERA) of under 3.00. By comparison, only 11 pitchers finished the 2009 MLB season with a sub-3.00 ERA. By July 31, pitchers were striking out an average of 7.03 batters per game, the highest of any MLB season. Teams were scoring an average of 4.94 runs per nine innings, the lowest since the 1992 season, and only one batter, Jose Bautista of the Blue Jays, had registered 30 or more home runs for the season. Following Halladay and Braden's perfect games, Galarraga's near-perfect game, and Stephen Strasburg's 14-strikeout major league debut, Roy S. Johnson of ESPN was one of the first to name 2010 the "Year of the Pitcher". Sports Illustrated echoed the term, and attributed the strong pitching performance of the season to a ban on performance-enhancing drugs for batters, greater attention to the development of young pitchers, as well as an influx of pitching talent across the league. By the end of the year, the MLB league-wide batting average was the lowest that it had been since 1992, and pitchers had thrown five official no-hitters or perfect games—six, with the inclusion of Galarraga.

Halladay and Johnson would pitch against each other several more times in their major league career. In a "perfect game rematch" on June 10, 2010, Halladay struck out eight batters, walked one, and allowed one run and six hits in eight innings, while Johnson struck out five, walked one, and gave up three hits. The Marlins ended their four-game losing streak in a 2–0 victory over the Phillies. On May 10, 2011, Halladay pitched a complete game loss when Omar Infante reached home on an error in the eighth inning. Johnson, who pitched only seven innings and left the game tied, was credited with a no decision. On April 11, 2012, Johnson, who had not won a game in nearly a year, allowed five runs in the third inning to clear the way for a 7–1 Phillies victory. Halladay, meanwhile, held the Marlins to one run across seven innings. Johnson, the Marlins' ace, maintained a respect for Halladay throughout their careers, referring to himself once as "like a little brother" to Halladay.

Shortly after midnight on November 7, 2017, Halladay died when the ICON A5 plane that he had been flying crashed into the Gulf of Mexico, off the coast of Florida. He was 40 years old. The Blue Jays officially retired Halladay's No. 32 jersey number on March 29, 2018, the first day of the 2018 season. The Phillies originally planned to retire Halladay's No. 34 jersey on May 29, 2020, the 10th anniversary of his perfect game, but the COVID-19 pandemic delayed the 2020 MLB season until July. The retirement ceremony was rescheduled for August 8, 2021. On January 22, 2019, the Baseball Writers' Association of America voted to elect Halladay into the National Baseball Hall of Fame. He received an 85.4% vote on the first ballot, far above the 75% threshold required for election. Halladay was posthumously inducted into the Hall of Fame on July 21, 2019; at the request of his family, Halladay's Hall of Fame plaque has no team logo on the baseball cap, as there was "no way to choose" between Toronto and Philadelphia.

== See also ==
- List of Major League Baseball perfect games
