= Jim Reynolds (umpire) =

American baseball umpire (born 1968)

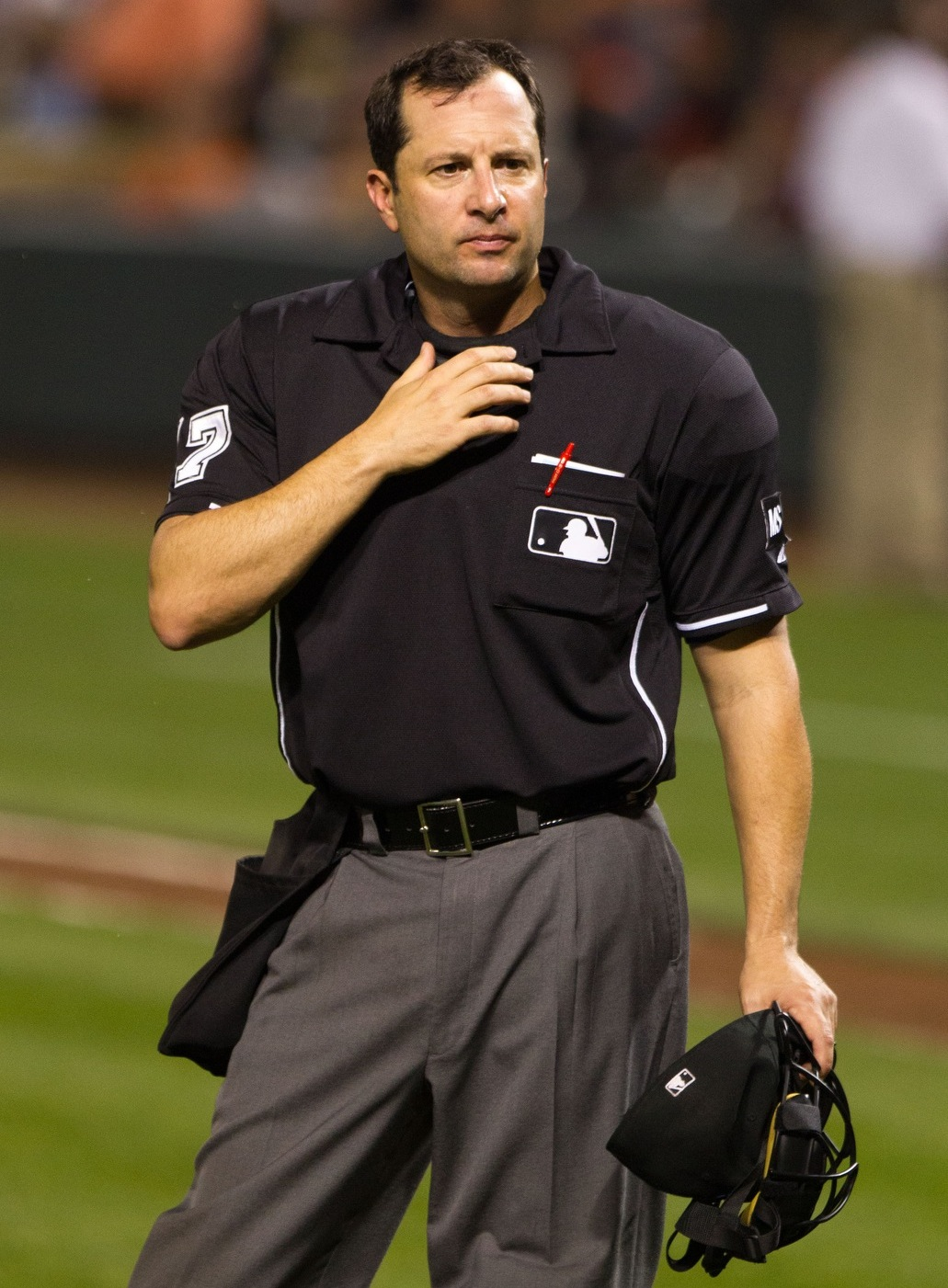
- Reynolds in 2012
- Born: December 22, 1968 (age 57); Marlborough, Massachusetts, U.S.

MLB debut
- June 4, 1999

Last appearance
- August 30, 2022

Career highlights and awards
- Special Assignments: All-Star Games (2004, 2018); Wild Card Games (2015, 2017, 2020); Division Series (2005, 2007, 2008, 2012, 2013, 2014, 2018); League Championship Series (2010, 2015, 2016, 2017, 2020); World Series (2014, 2018)

James Norris Reynolds IV (born December 22, 1968) is an American former Major League Baseball umpire. He joined the major league staff in 1999 and was promoted to crew chief for the 2020 season. Reynolds wore uniform number 77. He retired following the 2022 season.

== Early career ==
Reynolds previously worked in the New York–Penn League (1992), South Atlantic League (1993), California League (1994), Eastern League (1995), Southern League (1996), American Association (1997) and the International League (1998).

On June 15, 1992, Reynolds was base umpire for the Erie Sailors’ home opener against the Jamestown Expos. This New York–Penn League game was the first in the history of the Miami Marlins organization, who had named the Sailors as their first minor league affiliate. The home plate umpire was Dan Iassogna, who would also later become a full-time MLB umpire.

== Major league career ==
Reynolds joined the Major League Baseball umpiring staff in 1999 after the Major League Umpires Association mass resignations. He worked seven Division Series (2005, 2007, 2008, 2012, 2013, 2014, and 2018), five League Championship Series (2010, 2015, 2016, 2017, 2020) and two World Series (2014, 2018). He also umpired in the 2004 Major League Baseball All-Star Game.

Reynolds was the third base umpire for Rickey Henderson's 3,000th hit on October 7, 2001; that game was also Tony Gwynn's final MLB game.

Reynolds was the second base umpire on May 29, 2010, when Roy Halladay threw the 20th perfect game in MLB history.

== Personal life ==
Reynolds is married and graduated from South Catholic High School in Hartford, Connecticut. He played baseball at South Catholic under coach Tom DiFiore. Reynolds earned a degree in journalism at the University of Connecticut, which he attended with fellow umpire Dan Iassogna. He has three sisters.

== See also ==
- List of Major League Baseball umpires (disambiguation)
