= Tim Welke =

American baseball umpire (born 1957)

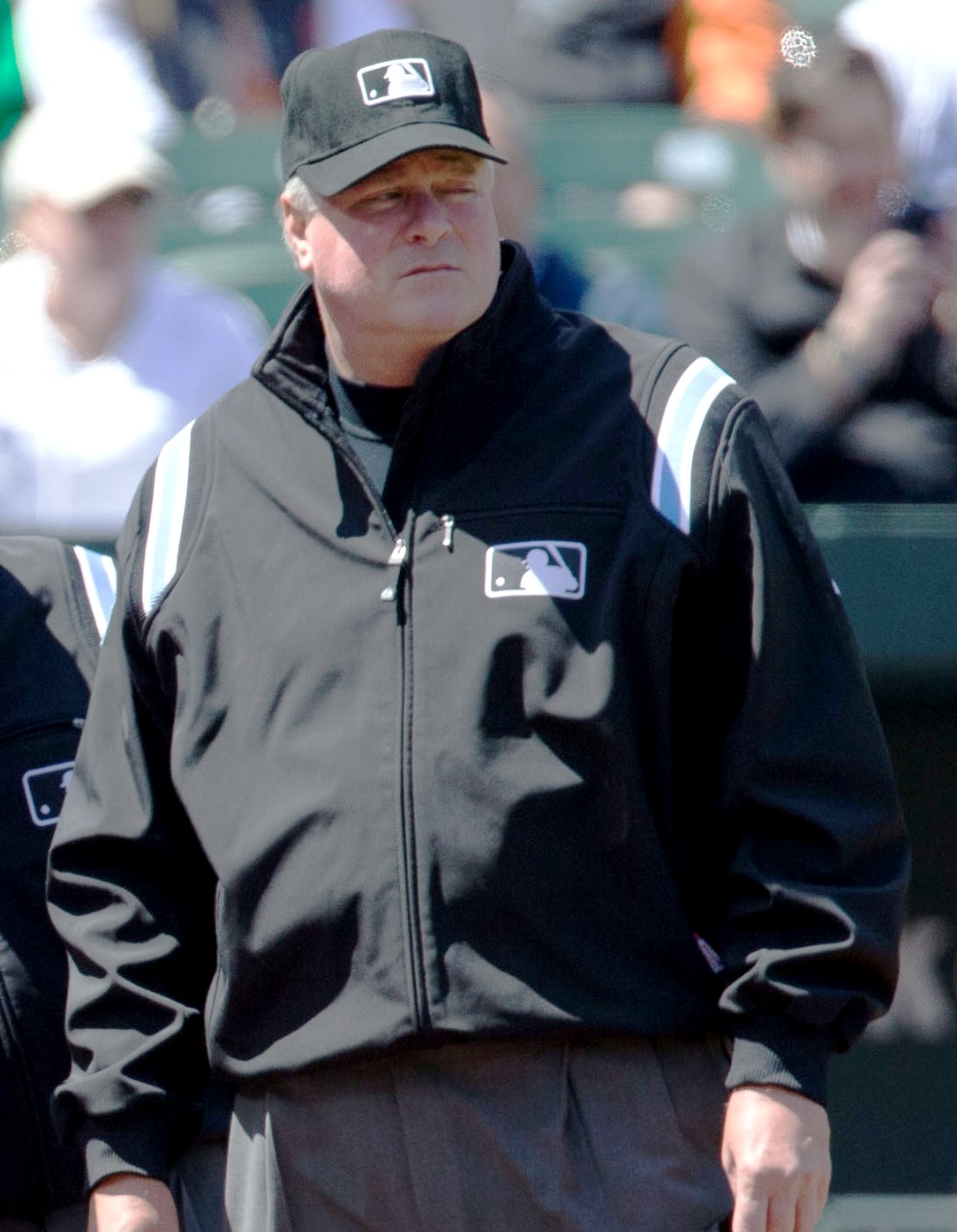
- Welke in 2013
- Born: August 23, 1957 (age 67); Pontiac, Michigan, U.S.

debut
- June 14, 1983

Last appearance
- October 4, 2015

Career highlights and awards
- Special Assignments: World Series (1996, 2000, 2003, 2008); League Championship Series (1991, 1998, 2001, 2002, 2004, 2006, 2011); Division Series (1995, 1996, 1999, 2000, 2003, 2008, 2010, 2013); All-Star Game (1990, 2005, 2015)

Timothy James Welke (born August 23, 1957) is an American former professional baseball umpire. He worked in the American League from 1984 to 1999 and has worked throughout Major League Baseball from 2000 to 2015. He had been a crew chief since 2000. Welke wore number 30 when he joined the American League staff, then switched to 3 after the AL and National League umpiring staffs merged in 2000. His brother Bill is also a major league umpire. Tim has umpired in four World Series, seven League Championship Series, eight Division Series and three All-Star Games.

== Minor league career ==
A youth baseball umpire since the age of 16, Welke entered minor league umpiring in 1977. He appeared in the Gulf Coast League (1977), Florida State League (1978–79), Eastern League (1980), American Association (1981–83), Florida Instructional League (1977–80) and Dominican Winter League (1981–83) prior to his major league promotion in 1984.

== MLB career ==
Welke umpired in the World Series in 1996, 2000, 2003, and 2008. He also worked the League Championship Series in 1991, 1998, 2001, 2002, 2004, 2006, and 2011; and the Division Series in 1995, 1996, 1999, 2000, 2003, 2008, 2010, and 2013. He served as crew chief for the NLCS in 2004 and 2006, the ALCS in 2011 and the ALDS in 1995 and 2000. He was also the crew chief for the 2008 World Series. He umpired in the All-Star Game in 1990, 2005, and 2015.

Welke spent 2005 and 2008–2010 on the same umpiring crew as his brother Bill.

=== Notable games ===
On April 29, 1986, he was the first base umpire when Roger Clemens of the Boston Red Sox achieved a record 20 strikeouts against the Seattle Mariners.

Welke ejected Atlanta Braves manager Bobby Cox from game six of the 1996 World Series.

Welke was also the first base umpire for Roy Halladay's perfect game on May 29, 2010; coincidentally, his brother Bill worked at third base that same game.

In a May 2, 2012 game between the Los Angeles Dodgers and Colorado Rockies at Coors Field, Welke made a controversial out call at first base against Jerry Hairston Jr. though first baseman Todd Helton's foot came well off the bag. Welke later admitted that he had missed the call. Hairston subsequently defended Welke and described him as "a really good umpire for a long time."

He served as crew chief for the 2014 Opening Series in Australia at the Sydney Cricket Ground.

In a September 16, 2014 game between the Washington Nationals and Atlanta Braves at Turner Field, immediately following an Ian Desmond two-run homer, Bryce Harper came up to bat. On an 0–1 count, an unruly Braves fan shouted profanity-laced insults at Harper. Upon hearing what the fan said, Welke took off his mask and ordered a nearby usher to remove the heckler from the ballpark. Harper struck out during the same at bat, but that did not stop the Nationals from clinching the NL East with a 3–0 win over the Braves.

On March 18, 2016, Welke announced his retirement after undergoing knee replacement surgery on one knee and a planned second surgery on the other knee.

== Personal life ==
Welke lives in his native state of Michigan. He graduated from Coldwater High School and attended Glen Oaks Community College. He is married with three children.

== See also ==
- List of Major League Baseball umpires (disambiguation)
