= Carlos Ruiz (baseball) =

Panamanian baseball player (born 1979)

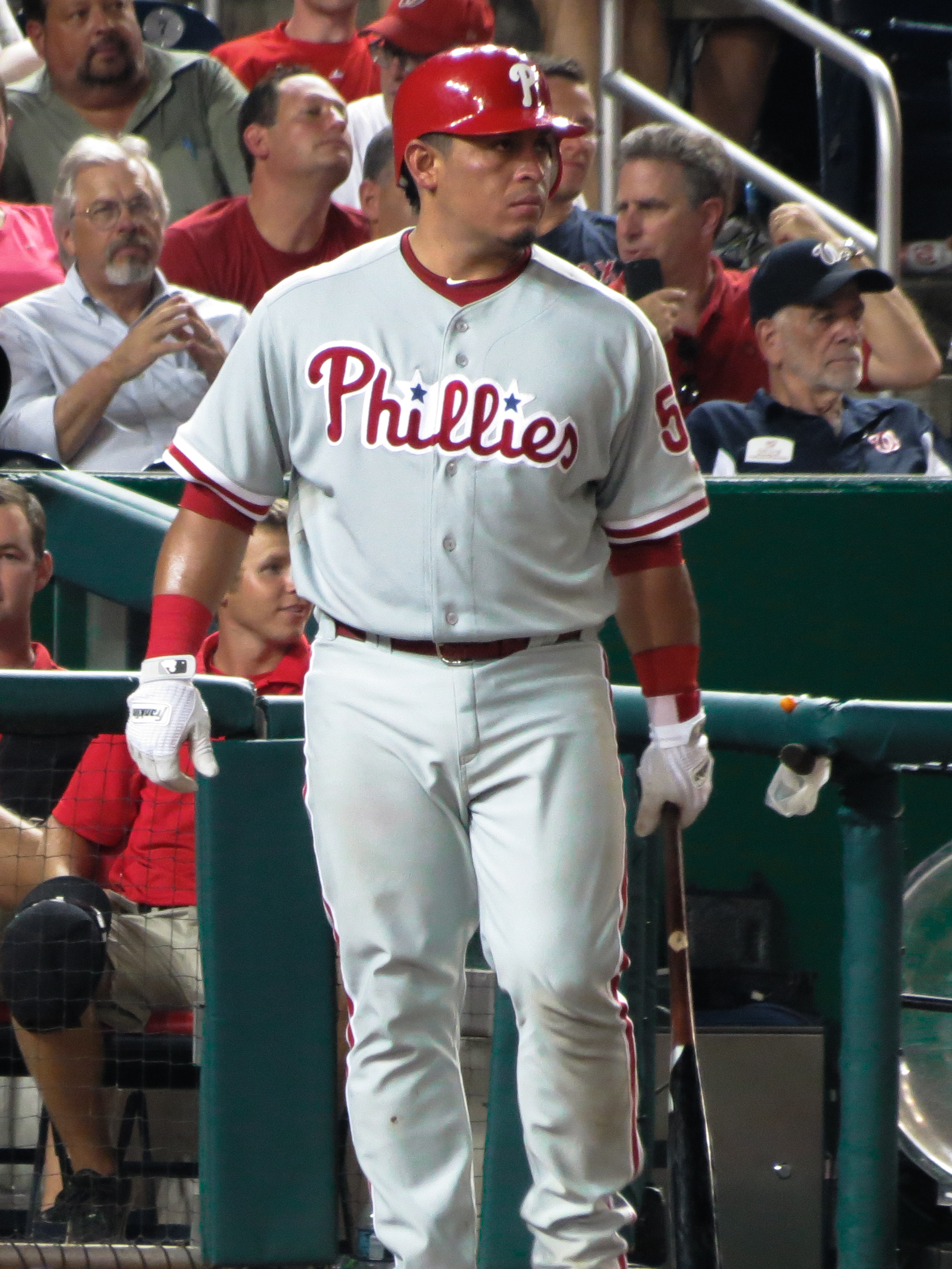
- Ruiz with the Philadelphia Phillies in 2012
- Catcher
- Born: January 22, 1979 (age 47); David, Chiriquí, Panama
- Batted: Right Threw: Right

MLB debut
- May 6, 2006, for the Philadelphia Phillies

Last MLB appearance
- September 30, 2017, for the Seattle Mariners

MLB statistics
- Batting average: .264
- Home runs: 71
- Runs batted in: 415
- Stats at Baseball Reference

Teams
- Philadelphia Phillies (2006–2016); Los Angeles Dodgers (2016); Seattle Mariners (2017)

Career highlights and awards
- All-Star (2012); World Series champion (2008)

Carlos Joaquín Ruiz (born January 22, 1979), nicknamed "Chooch", is a Panamanian former professional baseball catcher. He played in Major League Baseball (MLB) for the Philadelphia Phillies, Los Angeles Dodgers, and Seattle Mariners. Ruiz stands 5 ft 10 in (1.78 m) tall, and weighs 215 pounds (98 kg). He bats and throws right-handed.

As a seven-year-old, Ruiz resolved to play in the big leagues after both his father and grandmother died within two weeks of each other. He made his way through the Phillies farm system from 1998 until 2006, playing at each level of Minor League Baseball (MiLB). Ruiz soon fulfilled his childhood dream, making his MLB debut with the 2006 Phillies. He battled adversity in his progression through the system, including feeling homesick, a position change, and the language barrier (he spoke Spanish, while most teammates and team officials spoke English).

Ruiz spent his first full season in MLB with the Philadelphia Phillies in 2007 and remained there until he left the Mariners, electing free agency after the 2017 season. In 2008, for his strong postseason performance, including a walk-off hit, during the Phillies playoff run that concluded with victory in the 2008 World Series, he earned the nickname "Señor Octubre" (Mr. October). Despite being one of the quietest players on the team, Ruiz was subsequently called the "heart and soul" of the Phillies, serving as a constant source of encouragement and rebuke alike to his teammates. Over the following seasons, he was a part of the core group of players that led the Phillies to five consecutive playoff appearances, from 2007 until 2011.

Ruiz had his best offensive season in 2012, holding a batting average of over .300, earning his first appearance in the All-Star Game, and finishing in the top 30 of the NL Most Valuable Player (MVP) voting. In 2013, he began the season with a 25-game suspension for using Adderall, and subsequently spent time on the disabled list, ultimately playing in fewer than 100 games for the first time in his MLB career.

Ruiz is the only player in the history of the NL to catch four no-hitters, and one of only two catchers in all of MLB to do so (the other being Jason Varitek).

== Early life ==
Ruiz grew up in David, Chiriquí, Panama, and was the oldest of three sons. His father was a police officer and his mother was an elementary school teacher. When he was seven years old, his father Joaquin was patrolling in his police jeep when a tire blew out, causing the vehicle to flip, throwing Joaquin into a ditch, and then crushing him when it fell on top of him. Just weeks before, his grandmother died of cancer. As a result, Ruiz became "the new father", starting work shortly thereafter as a laborer on a coffee farm to supplement the family income, and by age 10 was earning about US$3 per day. He also promised his widowed mother that he would make it to Major League Baseball to support the family. Subsequently, he began attending college to earn a degree in physical education, but dropped out shortly after he began to attend the Phillies baseball academy.

Ruiz's upbringing contributed to his approach to the game. His mother insisted that he excel academically, and would not allow him to play baseball unless he did well in school. Baseball was his first love, and he was responsible for organizing the community's games:

Ruiz's natural leadership skills flourished. As a boy, Ruiz, who had chosen to play with baseballs instead of toy cars even as a toddler, was always the one in his neighborhood to organize pickup baseball games. It was he who brought the balls and bats, and it was he who picked the teams and ordered everyone to their positions. He had an acute understanding of the game. Ruiz was made to lead, and playing catcher eventually suited him perfectly.

— The making of an All-Star catcher by Jorge Arangure, Jr., ESPN.com, August 2, 2012

== Professional career ==
=== Minor leagues ===
In 1998, Ruiz followed his dream of playing professional baseball first by attending the Phillies Baseball Academy in La Vega, Dominican Republic, where he played catcher for the first time, moving from his initial position of second base. (Note: "Sal Agostinelli, the club's international scouting boss, didn't think Ruiz had the quickness to be a second baseman, but liked his swing and throwing arm." – Ruiz gives Phils the feeling they hit the lottery, by Jim Salisbury in The Philadelphia Inquirer, March 29, 2008) Though he was ready to quit because "he looked and felt like a 10-year-old among the tall, athletic prospects surrounding him", his uncle convinced him in a phone conversation to stick with it. The Phillies' scout Allan Lewis signed him as an amateur free agent on December 4, 1998, for US$8,000, and he made his professional debut in 1999 with the Dominican Summer League (DSL) team DSL Phillies, with whom he compiled a .305 batting average, 4 home runs, and 35 runs batted in (RBIs) in 60 games. Prior to the 2000 season, Ruiz met Mick Billmeyer, the Phillies' minor league catching coordinator, who served as his mentor. Billmeyer sought to learn Spanish while Ruiz sought to learn English, and the two bonded as Billmeyer helped mold Ruiz into an eventual top prospect and ultimately a starting catcher. In 2000, he came to America, progressing to play in the Gulf Coast League (GCL) for the GCL Phillies, and hitting .277 in 38 games. He earned another promotion in 2001, playing for the Lakewood BlueClaws of Class A Minor League Baseball. In 2001, his performance was similar in quality to his first two seasons, and he was promoted to the Clearwater Threshers of Class A-Advanced, with whom he played over parts of the next two seasons. He struggled at the plate in 2002, compiling just a .213 batting average in 92 games, but hit .315 in 15 games in 2003, and that year earned another promotion.

In 2004, Ruiz spent the entire season with the Double-A Reading Phillies, posting a .284 batting average and hitting 17 home runs, the latter of which was second among catchers in the Eastern League. In addition to his strong offensive numbers, he threw out 25 of 76 attempted base stealers (32.9%). Off the field, it was in 2004 that Ruiz first gained the original form of his nickname "Chooch". Though a quiet individual, Ruiz frequently muttered "chucha" (a strong curse word in Panama) under his breath, and teammate Anderson Machado thus began to address Ruiz as "chucha", which was later shortened to "Chooch", and the nickname's usage snowballed from there. His strong performance earned him another promotion in 2005 when he played for the Triple-A Scranton/Wilkes-Barre Red Barons, and posted a better batting average but fewer home runs than in Reading: .300, 4 home runs, 40 RBIs in 100 games. Before the 2006 season, he played for his native Panama in the first World Baseball Classic. His final season in the minor leagues was 2006. During 100 games, he hit .307 with 16 home runs and 69 RBIs, earning International League all-star accolades. He moved back and forth between Triple-A and the major league Phillies all year long, making his MLB debut on May 6, 2006.

=== Philadelphia Phillies ===
==== 2006 ====
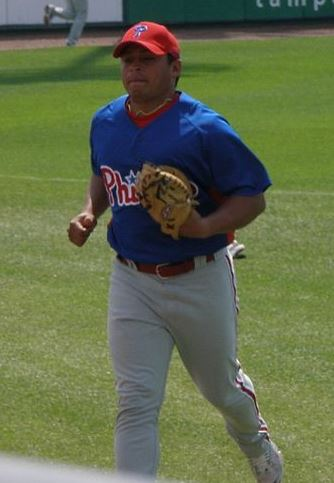
Ruiz during 2007 spring training

Ruiz was first brought up to the major league level when Phillies' starting catcher Mike Lieberthal went on the DL in May 2006, and Ruiz debuted on May 6. When Lieberthal returned, Ruiz was sent back to the minors. When Lieberthal went once again on the DL in June, the Phillies used Sal Fasano and Chris Coste rather than recalling Ruiz. He was recalled on July 4, when he hit his first major league home run off San Diego Padres' pitcher Clay Hensley. He was optioned back to the minor leagues once more before his recall on August 31—essentially a September callup. Overall, with the big league club, he hit .261 with 3 home runs and 10 RBIs.

==== 2007 ====
Ruiz permanently joined the Phillies' roster on opening day 2007, after eight seasons in the minor leagues. He ultimately "grabbed hold of the top job [as starting catcher] and never let go". The Phillies signed Rod Barajas before the season because of concerns about Ruiz's ability to catch, hit, and generally hold up over a full season at the major league level, as seasons there are longer than in the minor leagues. During the season, he honed his confidence and earned the trust of the Phillies' pitching staff, including veteran Jamie Moyer, who commented, "I see a real assuredness to his body language. He's not cocky or brash. He just seems very confident in what's going on." On June 26, Ruiz stole home on the front end of a double steal in an 11–4 home win over the Cincinnati Reds, becoming the first Phillie to steal home since Scott Rolen in 1997. He eventually played 115 games over the season, and from then on was the Phillies' regular starting catcher. Statistically, he committed only two errors, which tied for second-best among MLB catchers with at least 100 games played. He had 27 multi-hit games, hit 6 home runs and 51 RBIs with a .259 batting average. At the conclusion of the season, he was named to the Topps All-Star Rookie Team.

==== 2008 ====
Ruiz entered the 2008 season focused predominantly on defense, specifically helping the pitcher:

... Ruiz invests himself in the pitcher's performance. He and the pitcher succeed or fail together... Everything starts with pitching. 'Hitting is nice, but working with the pitcher is my No. 1 job. ... I want to feel like we are one person.'

— Excerpt from "Ruiz gives Phils the feeling they hit the lottery", by Jim Salisbury in The Philadelphia Inquirer, March 29, 2008

Ruiz struggled to hit consistently throughout the season, specifically in the first half; from the beginning of the year until July 11, he hit .206 with 2 home runs and 20 RBIs. Nevertheless, due to his rapport with the pitching staff (pitchers' earned run average when throwing to him was 3.56, the best for any catcher in the National League), and a vote of confidence from manager Charlie Manuel, he was secure in his position. In late July, he had a multi-hit game against the New York Mets, which may have helped him break out of his slump. Ultimately, during the regular season, he hit .219 with 4 home runs and 31 RBIs.

Despite his struggles at the plate during the regular season, Ruiz was an integral part of the Phillies' postseason success. After the Phillies clinched the 2008 National League Championship Series, he commented that the glory of winning a crucial baseball game that clinched the series, which he had witnessed while growing up in Panama on television, "happened to me", noting the aura of the moment, and that it culminated and validated the hard work he had put in over the years. Subsequently, in game 3 of the 2008 World Series, Ruiz tapped a ground ball up the third-base line for a walk-off infield single, the first in MLB history. Ruiz noted, "I heard them cheering. And that's when I knew, 'Okay it's over' ... I'll take a win." The Phillies eventually won the World Series for the first time since 1980, doing so in five games, the last of which began on October 27 and ended on October 29 after it was suspended part-way through due to rain. For his performance in the playoffs, he earned the nickname "Señor Octubre" (Mr. October in Spanish).

==== 2009 ====
Initially, Ruiz elected not to play in the 2009 World Baseball Classic, but after receiving a call from Martín Torrijos, the President of Panama, he agreed to play for the Panamanian team. Early in the season, he suffered a muscle strain in his right oblique, which lost him playing time while on the disabled list. Also early in the season, there was debate as to who should be the Phillies starting catcher, Ruiz or Chris Coste. Rob Neyer summarized the debate and ultimately endorsed Ruiz when he wrote,

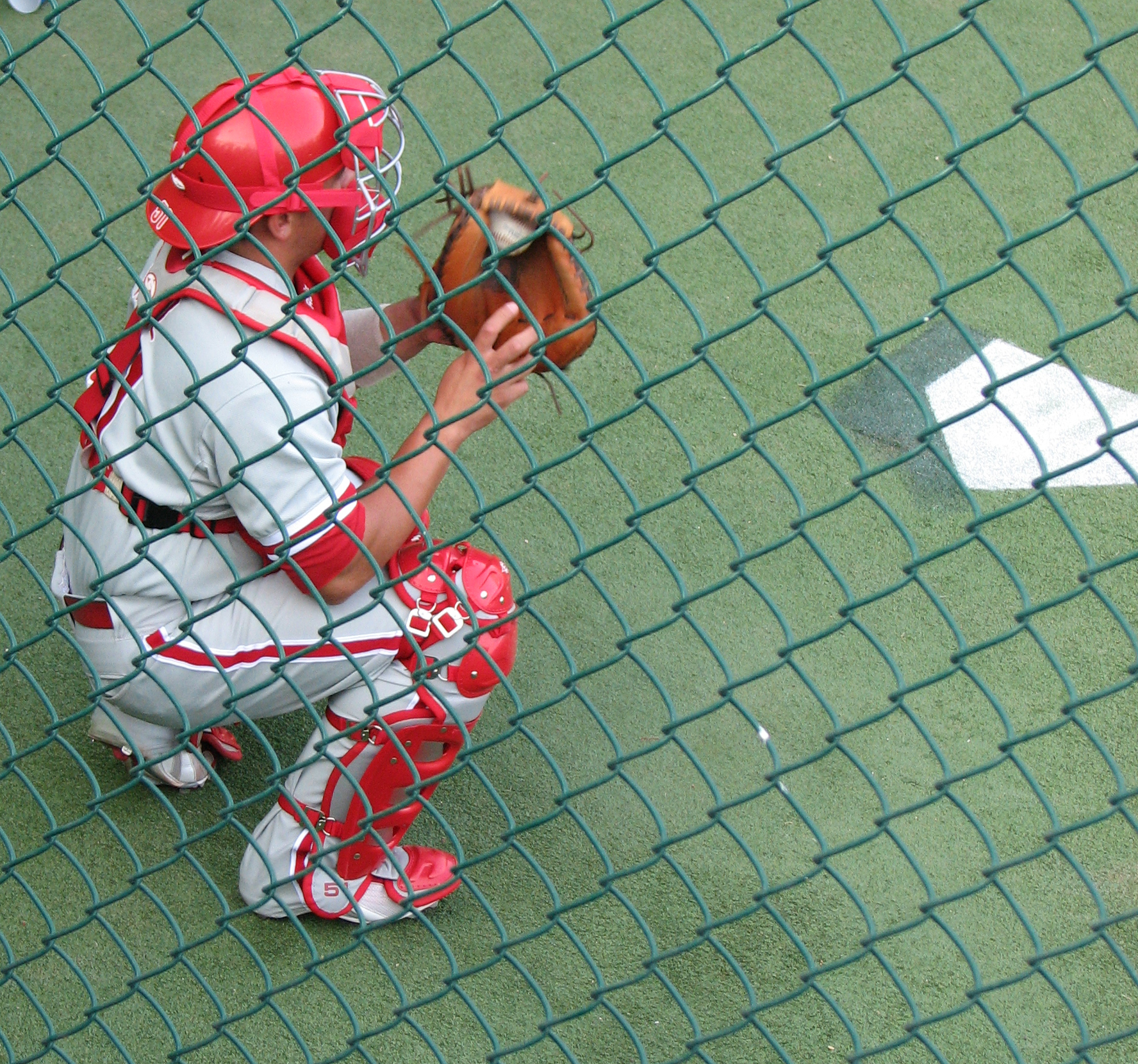
Ruiz warming up in the bullpen

It's Ruiz who has established himself as the superior hitter, almost solely because we expect him to draw more walks than Coste. Yes, Coste does have superior stats as a major leaguer ... But he is 36, and with a couple of exceptions he's not fared all that well in the high minors. Meanwhile, Ruis [sic] is six years younger and he's been relatively impressive in the high minors.

— Rob Neyer, SweetSpot Blog – ESPN, May 26, 2009

Ultimately, Ruiz was the regular starter. He finished the season on a hot streak; over the last 24 games, he hit .355 with 9 doubles, 1 home run, 11 RBIs, and .446 on-base percentage (OBP). In late September, he missed a week of games with inflammation in his left wrist. Despite his missed time, he started 100 games and set career highs in home runs (9) and base on balls (47), as well as posting a .255 batting average and 43 RBIs. Moreover, he walked more times than he struck out, a rare feat among modern major league hitters. In the postseason, he led the team with a .341 batting average, and recorded a .491 OBP, having reached base in each of the Phillies' 15 games, which perpetuated the usage of his nickname "Señor Octubre". Marcus Hayes of the Philadelphia Daily News wrote that Ruiz is "... the Phillies' Senor Octubre, a No. 8 hitter who hits like John Buck in the regular season, then turns into Johnny Bench come autumn."

==== 2010 ====
In 2010, Ruiz had a season filled with "indelible moments". He was catcher for Roy Halladay's perfect game on May 29, 2010, against the Florida Marlins and Halladay's no-hitter against the Cincinnati Reds in the first game of the National League Divisional Series on October 6, 2010, the first time a catcher had caught two no-hitters in one season since 1972. On May 4, he hit a walk-off home run, the second of his career, to lead the Phillies over the St. Louis Cardinals. Ruiz spent time on the DL in late June and early July with a concussion, but according to manager Charlie Manuel returned with a more efficient swing that allowed him to hit better against power pitchers. He led the team with a .302 batting average and a .400 on-base percentage. Both statistics also led National League catchers, and he even received a few votes for NL most valuable player. During the 2010 postseason, (Note: The Phillies reached the league championship series, but not the World Series for the first time since 2007) he did not perform as well as in past years—in nine games, he hit .192 with two home runs and four RBIs. Fans voted Ruiz the "X-Factor Player of the Year" in MLB's This Year in Baseball Awards. He also received the Pride of Philadelphia Award from the Philadelphia Sports Hall of Fame. Halladay called Ruiz a "rock" behind the plate, and presented him with a replica of his Cy Young Award.

==== 2011 ====
Ruiz returned for the Phillies' 2011 season as their everyday starting catcher, and started 113 games, of which the Phillies won 70 (.619 winning percentage). In May, he spent time on the DL with inflammation in his lower back. Over the Phillies' final 36 games, he posted a .342 batting average. Overall, he finished with the best catcher's ERA in the major leagues (3.06), a .283 batting average, 6 home runs, and 40 RBIs. His batting average was second on the team trailing only Hunter Pence.

==== 2012 ====
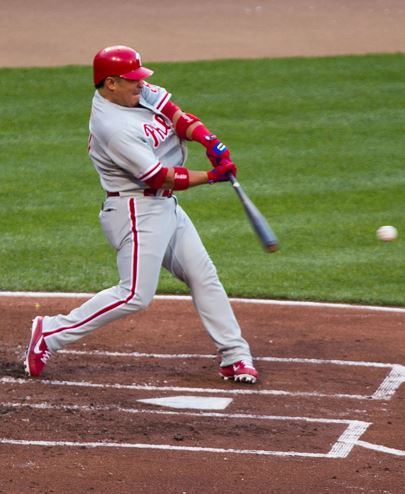
Ruiz hitting in a game against the Baltimore Orioles on June 8, 2012

Ruiz began the 2012 season strongly, and throughout the season was a bright spot on an otherwise disappointing team. Through June 27, he led the Major Leagues with a .364 average. This contributed to a stellar first half of the season earned him his first placement on the National League All-Star team. He was a reserve, though some analysts, including ESPN's John Kruk, felt his numbers warranted a starting nod, which ultimately went to the San Francisco Giants' Buster Posey through the fan voting. Shortly after the announcement that he was an all-star, a piece in The Philadelphia Daily News entitled "The evolution of Carlos Ruiz" summarized his career: "Ruiz, though, was never a major prospect. He was a reserve catcher before he was a starting catcher. He was a bottom-of-the-order hitter before he was a middle-of-the-order hitter. And now, for the first time in his career, Carlos Ruiz is an All-Star." After the all-star break, he spent over a month on the disabled list with plantar fasciitis, hindering his statistical totals, which at the time of his injury were among the best in the National League. He led all NL catchers in doubles, en route to posting a .325 batting average with 16 home runs and 68 RBIs, all of which were career highs. He finished 28th in MVP voting, the third consecutive season he had received votes.

==== 2013 ====
On November 27, 2012, Ruiz was suspended for 25 games without pay by the MLB for testing positive for an amphetamine called Adderall. The suspension of Ruiz was effective at the start of the 2013 season. Adderall is a drug prescribed for treating ADHD, described as a "central nervous system stimulant used to increase the attention span and decrease distractibility." He made his 2013 season debut on April 28 against the New York Mets at Citi Field. On May 20, he was placed on the DL with a Grade 2 strained hamstring. He came back with a four-hit game, which tied his career high, against the Los Angeles Dodgers on August 18, and hit .288 over the final two months of the season, commensurate with his past performance.

In the 2013 season, Ruiz compiled a .268 batting average, five home runs, and 37 RBIs in 92 games, his lowest major league total since 2006. After the season, Ruiz became a free agent. He re-signed on November 21, 2013, to a three-year contract worth US$26,000,000 plus a club option for a fourth season, giving the Phillies have an option to bring Ruiz back for a fourth season, at their discretion. Though one writer suggested his 2013 year might just have been an "aberration", most thought the Phillies overpaid to keep Ruiz, who turned 35 during the subsequent offseason.

==== 2014 ====
Before the 2014 season, he received an exemption from MLB to use Adderall, an exemption given to nine percent of MLB players despite only four percent of the American population diagnosed with the condition. After a slow start, Ruiz earned NL player of the week accolades in late April after he hit .500 during a Phillies' road trip. He sustained a concussion on June 26 that forced him to go on the disabled list; he began a rehabilitation assignment on July 17 with the Clearwater Threshers. On September 1, Ruiz was behind the plate for the combined no-hitter thrown by Cole Hamels, Jake Diekman, Ken Giles, and Jonathan Papelbon in a 7–0 victory over the Atlanta Braves. In 2014, Ruiz played 110 games batting .252 with six home runs and 31 RBI, and overall, had "a fine season ... [that] shouldn't get lost amid the many negatives." On October 1, 2014, Ruiz underwent a minor arthroscopic shoulder surgery.

==== 2015 ====
Cognizant of his increasing age and the wear catching places on one's body, the Phillies reduced Ruiz's workload during spring training, hoping to keep him fresh throughout the regular season. Regardless, he insisted upon catching pitchers' bullpen sessions so he could develop a feel and rapport with each pitcher. On July 25, Ruiz became the first catcher in the National League, and the second catcher in Major League Baseball history, to catch four no-hitters when teammate Cole Hamels no-hit the Chicago Cubs. Overall, Ruiz lost his starting job to Cameron Rupp, and had significant declines in many aspects of his game, particularly those at which he previously excelled, including framing pitches – in 2015, Baseball Prospectus ranked him worst in the league at doing so – and the mental aspect of the game, as he made several uncharacteristic errors.

==== 2016 ====
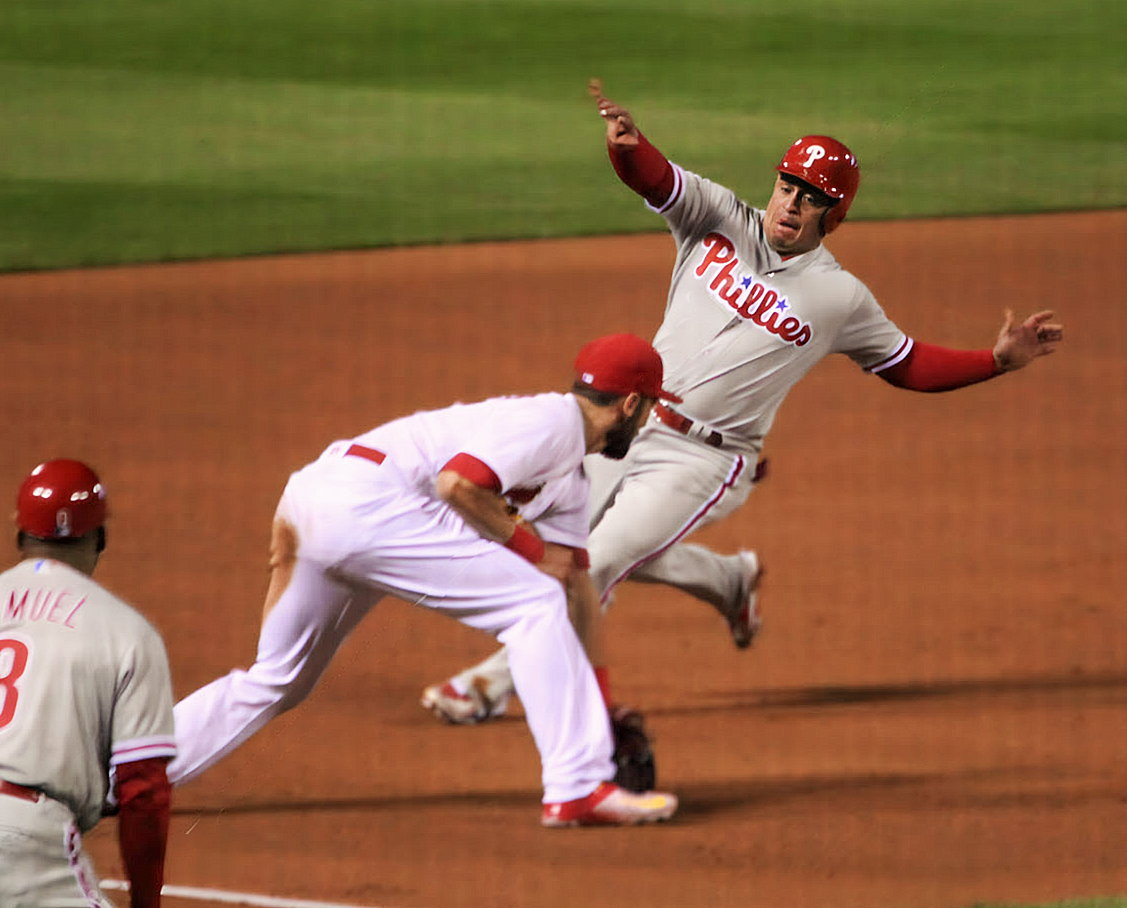
Carlos Ruiz slides into Matt Carpenter in St.Louis, 2016.

=== Los Angeles Dodgers ===
The Phillies traded Ruiz to the Los Angeles Dodgers on August 25, 2016, with cash considerations, for A. J. Ellis, Tommy Bergjans, and a player to be named later. The player to be named later turned out to be Joey Curletta. He backed up Yasmani Grandal with the Dodgers in September, appearing in 14 games and hitting .278. He was also two for four as a pinch hitter, with a two-run home run in the 2016 National League Division Series.

=== Seattle Mariners ===
Following the 2016 season, Ruiz was traded to the Mariners for pitcher Vidal Nuño. In a game against the Minnesota Twins, Ruiz pitched in the 8th inning, giving up one run and striking out Kennys Vargas for Ruiz's first career strikeout. On a July 7 game against the Oakland Athletics, while in the bullpen, he caught Nelson Cruz's 300th home run. On November 2, 2017, Ruiz elected free agency.

== Player profile ==
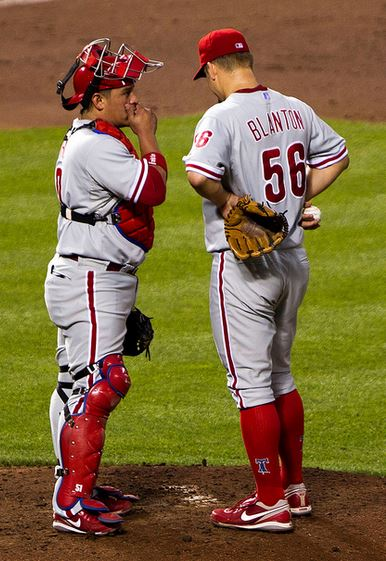
Ruiz (left) built a rapport with many members of the Phillies' pitching staff, as starting catcher.

=== Batting ===
Offensively, Ruiz developed from a "bottom-of-the-order hitter", to a patient hitter inclined to work the count, and finally to a hitter with solid gap-to-gap power. Ruiz has strong plate discipline that helps him draw walks and avoid strikeouts; he has almost as many walks as strikeouts over the course of his career, a rarity in the modern era of baseball. However, as his career progressed and he hit more towards the middle of the lineup, he has taken a more aggressive approach at the plate, and consequently he has struck out more often, but his home run totals have also increased. In 2014, his versatility and production at the plate encouraged his manager, Ryne Sandberg, to utilize him in various spots ranging from second through seventh in the batting order. At the prime of his career, he was among the best hitting catchers in MLB. Entering 2014, Ruiz had stolen only 16 bases over his first eight seasons; he had never been particularly fast, which initially caused his conversion from infielder to catcher, but because of his "hustle" on the basepaths, he won the Major League Baseball Players Alumni Association Heart and Hustle Award in 2012.

=== Catching ===
When catching, Ruiz seeks to become "one" with the day's pitcher; he takes their successes and failures personally, refusing to blame pitchers, and accepts equal responsibility. Phillies pitchers trust Ruiz and his ability to call games, and this ability's improvement has coincided with his increased proficiency in English. Cole Hamels attributes Ruiz's prowess in calling games to astute preparation, commenting,

I think he's very aware of what the hitter is trying to do in each count. He gives you a good target. It's almost like he understands what you're thinking and he's speaking to you without saying anything. ... If a catcher can help you, it makes your job so much easier and he can do that so well.

Ruiz realizes the importance of his role with the Phillies, opining, "It's the catcher's job to bring energy and happiness to the game." Ruiz has a good throwing arm that has improved over the years; over the course of his career he has thrown out 29% of attempted base stealers, which is exactly the average percentage of baserunners thrown out by catchers.

=== Playing style ===
A Sports Illustrated piece featuring Ruiz published in July 2011 encapsulated Ruiz's role as "heart and soul" of the team:

The most silent and timid Phillie might even become—by consensus of teammates and in the words of closer Brad Lidge—"the heart and soul of this team." The player who was the runaway winner in a team poll asking Phillies whom—if they were Batman—they'd choose as their Robin, proving that his effect extends far beyond his superhero pitching staff. The player who circulated in the clubhouse asking them how their families were doing, and how their hearts and minds and bodies felt. The man who went to each player in the dugout as each game was about to start to exchange a new touch: knuckles yesterday, low-fives today, fist pounds to their hearts tomorrow, so hard that they'd yearn for his chest protector. The one who tore into them when they were lax and verbalized what team leaders Chase Utley and Halladay kept tight under wraps. The one taking charge as if he has been here forever and yet still asking questions as if he has just been called up. The most endearing player to the sold-out crowds at Citizens Bank Park every night, even when his average dips to .255, as it has this season, crossing a cultural moat that Hispanic players often can't—the Phillie whom bartender Tubby Kushner impersonates every game he attends, from uniform down to the shin guards, chest protector, mask and, yes, even cup—because fans feel like he's their little secret, their little golden nugget.

— Excerpt from "The Legion Of Arms: Part II Brotherly Glove", July 18, 2011 edition of Sports Illustrated

He is a favorite among Phillies fans, and crossed "a cultural moat that Hispanic players often can't" to endear himself to not only the fan base, but also his teammates. Before games, he humorously imitates teammates to help keep the team loose and relaxed, furthering his role as a leader. Overall, Ruiz "is a man who refuses to conceal his emotions", positive or negative, and serves as a constant source of encouragement and rebuke alike to his teammates.

=== No-hitters caught ===
In 2015, Ruiz tied Jason Varitek for the major-league record of most no-hitters caught, with four. Ruiz was also the first catcher since 1972 to catch two no-hitters in the same season and the first to catch a perfect game and a no-hitter in the same season. The no-hitters caught by Ruiz all came during his tenure with the Phillies:

- Roy Halladay: May 29, 2010, vs Florida (the 20th perfect game in major-league history)
- Roy Halladay: October 6, 2010, vs Cincinnati (the second no-hitter in major-league postseason history)
- Cole Hamels, Jake Diekman, Ken Giles, and Jonathan Papelbon: September 1, 2014, vs Atlanta (the first combined no-hitter since Seattle's six-man no-hitter in 2012)
- Cole Hamels: July 25, 2015, vs Chicago (NL) (the first time the Cubs had been no-hit since Sandy Koufax's perfect game in 1965)

== Sources ==
- Stark, Jayson (2009). Worth the Wait: Tales of the 2008 Phillies. Chicago: Triumph Books. ISBN 978-1-60078-273-2.
