= Harvey Dorfman =

American psychologist (1935–2011)

Harvey A. Dorfman (May 21, 1935 – February 28, 2011) was an American mental skills coach who worked in education and psychology as a teacher, counselor, coach, and consultant. Prior to becoming a mental skills coach, he lived in Manchester, Vermont, where he wrote for a local paper, taught English, and coached basketball at Burr and Burton Academy. He earned World Series rings by serving, as a mental skills coach for the 1989 Oakland A's and the 1997 Florida Marlins. In 1999, Dorfman became a full-time consultant teaching the skills of sport psychology and staff development for the Scott Boras Corporation, an agency that represents professional baseball players. A freelance journalist, Dorfman lectured at major universities and for corporations on psychology, self-enhancement, management strategies, and leadership training. He died on February 28, 2011.

Acclaimed former Philadelphia Phillies pitcher Jamie Moyer was a client of Dorfman's, as was former Toronto Blue Jays and Phillies ace Roy Halladay. Moyer dedicated both his 2013 memoir and a planned pitching academy to his former counselor. "I learned so much from that man," Moyer said, "and to be able to use that knowledge for myself, I really believe I can help others go in the same direction." Dorfman played a role in developing the field of sports mental health and was described as a "pioneering sports psychologist".

== Books ==
- The Mental ABC's of Pitching: A Handbook for Performance Enhancement, Diamond Communications (2000) ISBN 1-888698-29-2
- The Mental Keys to Hitting: A Handbook of Strategies for Performance Enhancement, Diamond Communications (2001) ISBN 1-888698-38-1
- The Mental Game of Baseball: A Guide to Peak Performance, with Karl Kuehl, Diamond Communications (1989, 2002) ISBN 0-912083-32-8
- Persuasion of My Days: An Anecdotal Memoir: The Early Years, Hamilton (2005) ISBN 0-7618-2980-6
- Coaching the Mental Game: Leadership Philosophies and Strategies for Peak Performance in Sports and Everyday Life, foreword by Carlos Tosca, Taylor Trade (2005) ISBN 1-58979-011-1
- Copying It Down: An Anecdotal Memoir: Sport as Art, Hamilton (2009) ISBN 978-0-7618-4755-7
- Each Branch, Each Needle: An Anecdotal Memoir: The Final Stories, Hamilton (2010) ISBN 978-0-7618-5074-8
