= Roy Halladay =

American baseball pitcher (1977–2017)

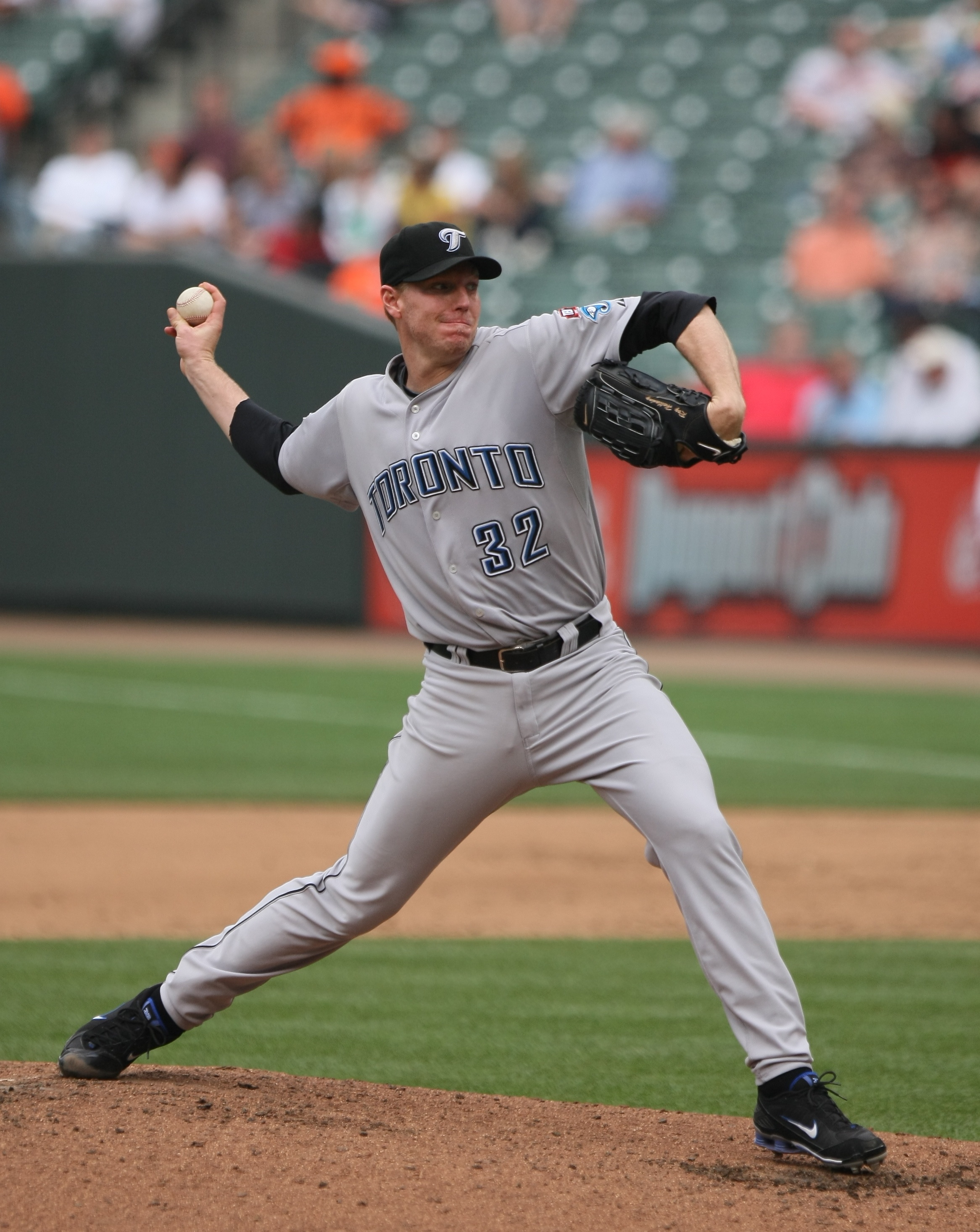
- Halladay with the Toronto Blue Jays in 2009
- Pitcher
- Born: May 14, 1977; Denver, Colorado, U.S.
- Died: November 7, 2017 (aged 40); Gulf of Mexico near New Port Richey, Florida, U.S.
- Batted: Right Threw: Right

MLB debut
- September 20, 1998, for the Toronto Blue Jays

Last MLB appearance
- September 23, 2013, for the Philadelphia Phillies

MLB statistics
- Win–loss record: 203–105
- Earned run average: 3.38
- Strikeouts: 2,117
- Stats at Baseball Reference

Teams
- Toronto Blue Jays (1998–2009); Philadelphia Phillies (2010–2013)

Career highlights and awards
- 8× All-Star (2002, 2003, 2005, 2006, 2008–2011); 2× Cy Young Award (2003, 2010); 2× MLB wins leader (2003, 2010); Pitched a perfect game on May 29, 2010; Pitched a postseason no-hitter on October 6, 2010; Toronto Blue Jays No. 32 retired; Philadelphia Phillies No. 34 retired; Toronto Blue Jays Hall of Excellence; Philadelphia Phillies Wall of Fame

Member of the National

Baseball Hall of Fame
- Induction: 2019
- Vote: 85.4% (first ballot)

Harry Leroy Halladay III (May 14, 1977 – November 7, 2017) was an American professional baseball pitcher who played in Major League Baseball (MLB) for the Toronto Blue Jays and Philadelphia Phillies between 1998 and 2013. His nickname, "Doc", coined by Toronto Blue Jays announcer Tom Cheek, was a reference to Wild West gunslinger Doc Holliday. His lasting durability allowed him to lead the league in complete games seven times, the most of any pitcher whose career began after 1945. He also led the league in strikeout-to-walk ratio five times and innings pitched four times. An eight-time All-Star, Halladay was one of the most dominant pitchers of his era and is regarded as one of the greatest pitchers of all time.

Raised in Arvada, Colorado, Halladay pitched at Arvada West High School before being drafted 17th overall by the Blue Jays in the 1995 MLB draft. He made his major league debut in 1998, nearly pitching a no-hitter in his second career start. After struggling in 2000, he was demoted to the low minor leagues, where he reworked his delivery and pitching. In 2002, Halladay established himself as a durable, elite starting pitcher, earning his first All-Star selection. The following year, he won the American League (AL) Cy Young Award and led the AL in complete games, which he accomplished five times in seven seasons, through 2009. Traded to the Phillies before the 2010 season, he pitched both the 20th perfect game and the second postseason no-hitter in major league history, led the majors in shutouts for the second consecutive year, and won the National League (NL) Cy Young Award. In 2011, Halladay had another dominant season, leading the NL in complete games, but he was plagued by injuries the next two years. After the 2013 season, he announced his retirement.

On November 7, 2017, Halladay died when he crashed his Icon A5 amphibious plane into the Gulf of Mexico off the coast of Florida. He was 40 years old. The following year the Blue Jays organization retired his number 32; the Phillies retired his number 34 in 2021. In 2019, Halladay was posthumously inducted into the Baseball Hall of Fame in his first year of eligibility.

== Early life ==
Born in Denver, Colorado, Halladay grew up in the suburb of Arvada; his father, Harry Leroy Halladay II, was a pilot for a food-processing company, who began teaching his son to fly during the younger Halladay's early childhood; his mother, Linda, was a homemaker. Halladay was raised a member of the Church of Jesus Christ of Latter-day Saints, though he did not practice later in life.

From an early age, Halladay loved baseball, trying every position on the field until, by age 14, his success on the pitcher's mound attracted the attention of major league scouts. By the age of 13, he had begun training with Colorado baseball guru Bus Campbell, who had helped almost every promising pitcher from the Denver area, including Goose Gossage and Brad Lidge.

Halladay attended Arvada West High School, where he led the school's baseball team to a 6A state championship in 1994. In 1995, after graduating from high school, he was selected by the Toronto Blue Jays in the amateur draft, in the first round, as the 17th overall pick. Halladay decided to forego his college baseball commitment to Arizona and sign with Toronto. He was promoted to the major-league club as a September call-up in 1998.

== Career ==
=== Toronto Blue Jays (1998–2009) ===
==== 1998–2001 ====
In his second career start, against the Detroit Tigers on September 27, 1998, Halladay had what would have been the third no-hitter ever pitched on the final day of a regular season broken up with two outs in the ninth. The feat would have joined the combined no-hitter by four Oakland Athletics pitchers (Vida Blue, Glenn Abbott, Paul Lindblad, and Rollie Fingers) in 1975 and Mike Witt's perfect game in 1984. The bid was broken up by pinch hitter Bobby Higginson's solo home run, the only hit allowed in a 2–1 Toronto victory, as Halladay recorded his first major league win. Prior to the home run, the sole base runner had reached on an infield error in the fifth inning, as Halladay struck out eight and walked none.

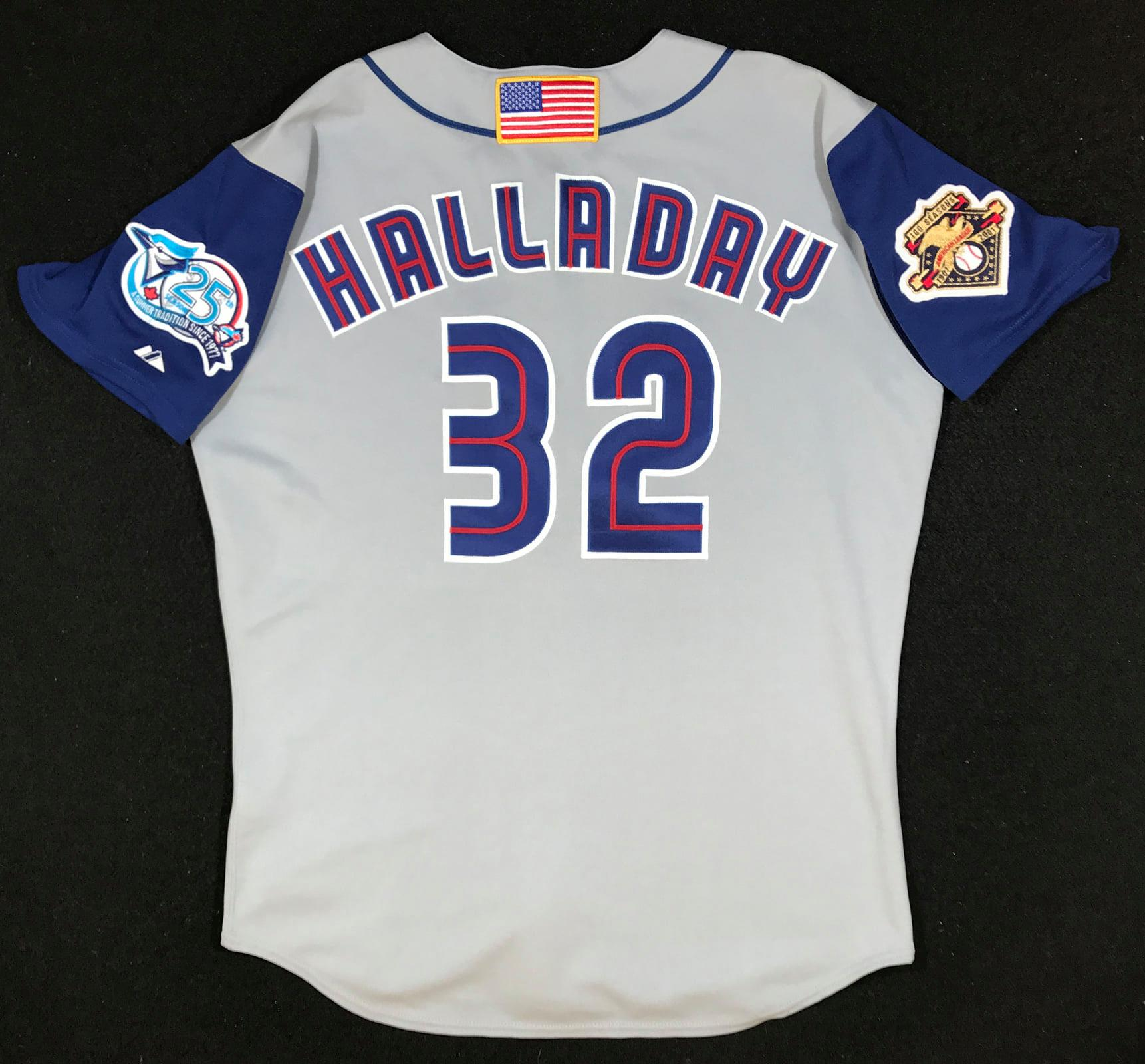
2001 Toronto Blue Jays #32 Roy Halladay road jersey (after 9/11)

In 2000, Halladay took a major step back from his promising rookie years and posted a disastrous 10.64 earned run average (ERA) in 19 games (13 of which he started) making his 2000 season the worst in history for any pitcher with at least 50 innings pitched. At the beginning of the 2001 season, Halladay was optioned to Class-A Dunedin to rebuild his delivery. Halladay's fastball was clocked as high as 95 mph (153 km/h), but it had little movement, and his pitches were up in the strike zone, which was ultimately the reason why his 2000 season was so unsuccessful. He considered quitting baseball. Instead, he worked in the minors with former Blue Jays pitching coach Mel Queen. The problem, Queen realized, was Halladay's total reliance on his strength: his attempt to overpower batters with straight-ahead pitches. Within two weeks, Halladay had altered his arm angle for a more deceptive delivery, and added pitches that sank and careened. Instead of throwing over the top, he chose to use a three-quarters delivery (the middle point between throwing overhand and sidearm). Originally a fastball pitcher, he became reliant on keeping his pitches low across the plate, regardless of the type of pitch thrown. The adjustments proved successful. After a month and a half, he was promoted to Double-A Tennessee, and a month later, to Triple-A Syracuse. In 2001, after being demoted to the minor leagues, Halladay immersed himself in the works of sports psychologist Harvey Dorfman. This exposure was at least partly responsible for resurrecting his career. By mid-season, he was back in the Blue Jays' rotation. He posted a 5–3 win–loss record with a 3.19 ERA for the Blue Jays in 16 starts in 2001.

==== 2002–2006 ====
In 2002, Halladay had a breakout season, finishing with a 19–7 record, while posting a 2.93 ERA with 168 strikeouts in 239.1 innings. Halladay was named to the American League All-Star team. Halladay continued his success in the 2003 season, posting a 22–7 record with a 3.25 ERA in 266 innings. He also recorded 204 strikeouts and only 32 walks, good for a 6.38 strikeout-to-walk ratio. Halladay pitched the first extra-inning shutout in the major leagues since Jack Morris in Game 7 of the 1991 World Series, leading the Blue Jays to victory over the Tigers on September 6. He pitched 10 innings and did not allow a hit until Kevin Witt doubled with two outs in the top of the eighth. Halladay won the American League Cy Young Award, while being once again named an All-Star and leading the Blue Jays to a surprising 86 victories. He was named by his peers as the Players Choice Awards AL Outstanding Pitcher. He was also named the Sporting News AL Pitcher of the Year and the Baseball Prospectus Internet Baseball Awards AL Cy Young Award winner.

In 2004, Halladay was placed on the disabled list twice due to right shoulder problems. In 133.0 innings, he went 8–8 with a 4.20 ERA. He walked 39 batters, seven more than he had walked in 2003 when he had pitched twice as many innings. He later revealed that he had been injured throughout the entire season with a "tired throwing arm", which he believed was from intense workouts in the preseason.

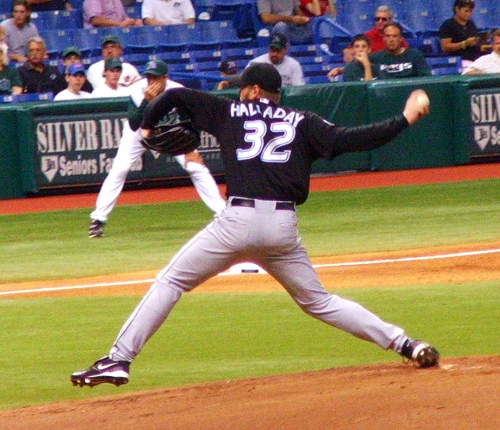
Halladay with Toronto in 2006

The 2005 season began successfully for Halladay, as he posted a 12–4 record with a 2.41 ERA in 19 starts. He was selected to his third All-Star team and was slated to be the starting pitcher for the American League at the All-Star Game in Detroit. However, on July 8, Halladay's leg was broken by a line drive off the bat of Texas Rangers left fielder Kevin Mench. As a result, he was replaced in the All-Star Game by Matt Clement of the Boston Red Sox, while Mark Buehrle of the Chicago White Sox was named the starting pitcher for the American League. Despite rehabilitation of his leg, Halladay would sit out the remainder of the season. On March 16, 2006, Halladay signed a three-year, $40 million contract extension through 2010. During that year, Halladay finished near the top of MLB in wins with 16. He was named to the American League All-Star Team as a reserve on July 3, along with four of his Blue Jays teammates. It marked the second-most appearances in club history, and Halladay's fourth as an All-Star. Although Halladay's strikeout total was lower in 2006 than in previous seasons, his ground ball/fly ball ratio, complete games, and innings pitched were all among the American League leaders.

==== 2007–2009 ====
Halladay was the American League pitcher of the month in April 2007, going 4–0, highlighted by a 10-inning complete-game win over the Detroit Tigers. However, he pitched poorly in his two starts in May, and on May 11 was placed on the disabled list and underwent an appendectomy. He returned to the rotation in his usual form on May 31 against the Chicago White Sox. Halladay went seven innings, giving up just six hits and allowing no runs on his way to his 100th career win. 2007 also saw Halladay hit his first career RBI. Against the Los Angeles Dodgers on June 10, his ground ball single to center field allowed John McDonald to score. He shut out the Seattle Mariners on July 22, allowing only three hits.

In 2008, for the sixth consecutive year, Halladay was Toronto's opening-day starter, improving his own club record. He lost 3–2 to the New York Yankees, in a pitcher's duel with Chien-Ming Wang. His first win of the season came in his next start, against Boston, when he outpitched Josh Beckett.

In his third start, Halladay pitched a complete game against the Texas Rangers, in a 4–1 win. Three of his nine complete-game efforts resulted in losses due to Toronto's underachieving offense early in the season. In fact, those three complete-game losses came in three consecutive starts. On June 20 against the Pittsburgh Pirates, he was struck in the temple by a line drive off the bat of Nyjer Morgan. The ball caromed off Halladay's head and was caught by third baseman Scott Rolen, ending the inning. Halladay was able to walk back to the dugout, but was taken out of the game for safety concerns. Although he was given a clean bill of health for his next start, it was later suggested by television commentators that Halladay may have in fact suffered a temporary lapse in recognition of what happened on the play. Halladay pitched his 10th career shutout against the Seattle Mariners on June 30. He limited them to four hits in his sixth complete game of the season. The shutout tied him with the Cardinals' Mark Mulder for 10th among active pitchers. On July 11, 2008, Halladay pitched his seventh complete game and second shutout of the season against the New York Yankees, allowing no runs on two hits for his 11th career shutout. Halladay was named to the American League All-Star Team as a reserve. He pitched in the fourth inning, yielding one hit, and striking out Lance Berkman. In his last start of the season, he fittingly pitched a complete game against the Yankees, earning his 20th win of the year. In so doing, he became the first pitcher to win five games against the Yankees in a single season since Luis Tiant in 1974. In addition, he led the AL with a 1.05 WHIP. Halladay finished second in the American League Cy Young Award voting, behind Cliff Lee of Cleveland. He also led the AL with nine complete games, and struck out a career-high 206 batters (two more than his 2003 season) as well as posting a 2.78 ERA (the second-best of his career) that was second only to Cliff Lee's 2.54 ERA. Halladay also became just the fourth pitcher in major league history to post two seasons of 200 strikeouts and fewer than 40 walks. He was presented the George Gross/Toronto Sun Sportsperson of the Year award.

On April 6, 2009, Halladay made his team-record seventh straight Opening Day start for Toronto, defeating the Detroit Tigers. Halladay then also won his next two starts, on the road against Cleveland and Minnesota. Halladay lost his next game to Texas, giving up five earned runs over eight innings. He then rang up victories in his next six starts, giving him an 8–1 record with a 2.75 ERA. With season-ending injuries to planned 2009 Jays' starters Dustin McGowan and Shawn Marcum, and with #2 starter Jesse Litsch on the disabled list early in the season, Halladay led a staff of young, mostly inexperienced starters. He was named the AL Player of the Week for the period ending May 17, having gone 2–0 with a 1.13 ERA over 16.0 innings in his two starts that week. In a game against the Los Angeles Angels of Anaheim on June 2, Halladay struck out 14 batters and threw 133 pitches, both career highs. On June 12, he left the game early because of a strained hip adductor muscle, commonly referred to as a pulled groin, and was placed on the 15-day disabled list on June 17. On July 5, he was selected to represent Toronto at the All-Star Game. On July 14, he started the All-Star Game for the American League, pitching two innings and giving up three runs, of which one was unearned. That year, he was named #7 on the Sporting News's list of the 50 greatest current players in baseball. A panel of 100 baseball people, many of them members of the Baseball Hall of Fame and winners of major baseball awards, was polled to arrive at the list.

As of the conclusion of his start on September 20, 2009, Halladay was tied for the second-longest streak in the American League that season with a 24-inning scoreless streak. Halladay finished the season with a 17–10 record, giving him a career win percentage of .660, good enough for 18th all-time. In December, Sports Illustrated named Halladay as one of the five pitchers in the starting rotation of its MLB All-Decade Team.

=== Philadelphia Phillies (2010–2013) ===
On December 15, 2009, the Blue Jays traded Halladay to the Philadelphia Phillies for minor league prospects Travis d'Arnaud, Kyle Drabek, and Michael Taylor. He agreed to a contract extension worth US$60 million, which included a US$20 million vesting option for a fourth season. Phillies general manager Ruben Amaro, Jr. had unsuccessfully attempted to get Halladay at the non-waiver trade deadline in July 2009, then traded for Cliff Lee instead. Three hours before Halladay signed the contract extension, Amaro traded away Lee, to the surprise of Halladay, who thought that Lee would be his teammate. In fact, the Phillies' acquisition of Halladay and trade of Lee were deeply intertwined, as the team wanted to strengthen the rotation without emptying the farm system of prospects. They traded several prospects for Halladay, then refreshed the system with the return haul for Lee.

==== 2010 ====
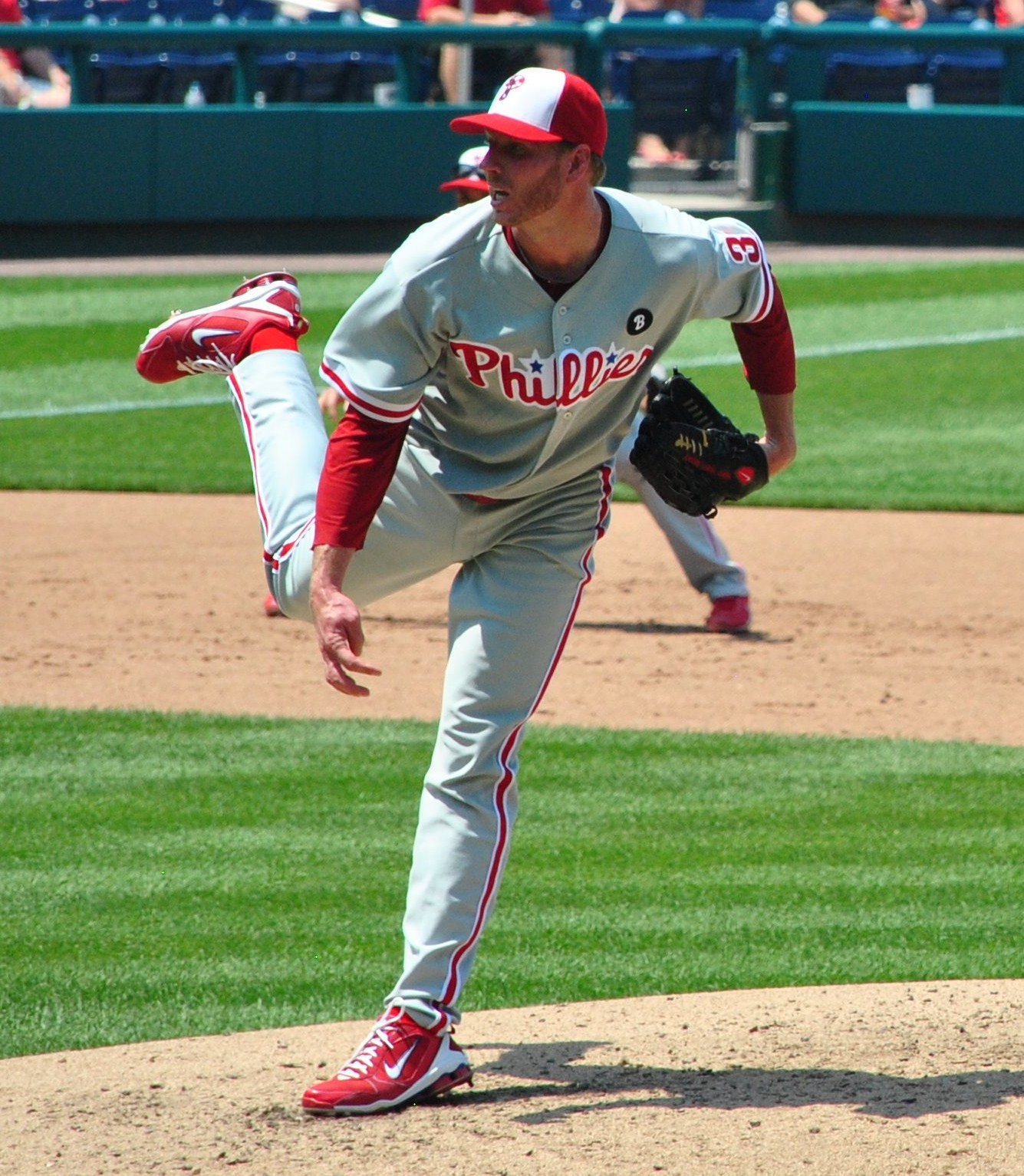
Halladay pitching for the Phillies

On Opening Day, Halladay pitched seven innings while giving up a run against the Washington Nationals in his first game with the Phillies. He had nine strikeouts and allowed six hits. He also drove in his second career RBI and earned his first win of the season. He followed this start with a complete game on April 11 against the Houston Astros, giving up one unearned run while striking out eight and not giving up any walks in the Phillies' 2–1 victory.

Halladay pitched his first shutout in the National League, against the Atlanta Braves on April 21, becoming the first pitcher to reach four wins in the 2010 season. On May 1, Halladay pitched his second shutout of the season, limiting the New York Mets to three hits and striking out six.

On September 21, Halladay became the first Phillies pitcher to win 20 games in a season since Steve Carlton accomplished it in 1982. He was the first right-handed Phillies pitcher to accomplish the feat since Robin Roberts in 1955. One week later, on September 27, he completed his 21st victory, helping the Phillies clinch their fourth consecutive National League East title, and the Phillies finished with the best regular-season record in MLB.

Halladay made his first postseason start in Game 1 of the National League Division Series, as the Phillies squared off against the Cincinnati Reds. Halladay threw a no-hitter, giving up only one walk (to Jay Bruce in the fifth inning) in a 4–0 victory where he threw 104 pitches. Halladay's was only the second postseason no-hitter in Major League Baseball history, and the first since Don Larsen's perfect game in the 1956 World Series. Halladay became the first pitcher in Major League history to throw a perfect game and another no-hitter in the same calendar year (including the postseason).

The Phillies swept the Reds in three games to advance to their third consecutive National League Championship Series, where they faced the San Francisco Giants. Halladay started Games 1 and 5, which were one of the most touted postseason pitching match-ups in recent history as he faced another former Cy Young winner in both games, Tim Lincecum. Halladay lost Game 1, 4–3, and won Game 5, 4–2, as the Phillies were eliminated in six games by the Giants, who went on to win the World Series. In Game 5, Halladay pulled his groin after the first inning but continued for six more innings to help his team stave off elimination.

Halladay was named by his peers as the Players Choice Awards NL Outstanding Pitcher. He was also unanimously chosen as the recipient of the 2010 National League Cy Young Award, becoming the first Phillie to win the award since Steve Bedrosian in 1987 and only the fifth pitcher in MLB history to win the award in both leagues, joining Gaylord Perry, Pedro Martínez, Randy Johnson and Roger Clemens. He was likewise selected as the Sporting News NL Pitcher of the Year, the USA Today NL Cy Young, the Baseball Prospectus Internet Baseball Awards NL Cy Young, and the winner of the NLBM Wilbur "Bullet" Rogan Legacy Award (NL Pitcher of the Year). He also was named the MLB "This Year in Baseball Awards" Starting Pitcher of the Year. Baseball Digest named him its Pitcher of the Year (including both leagues). Baseball America named him its Major League Player of the Year (including all positions in both leagues). MLB named him its "MLB Clutch Performer of the Year". He was given the Heart & Hustle Award by the Major League Baseball Players Alumni Association. He was also named Pro Athlete of the Year by both the Sporting News and the Philadelphia Sports Writers Association and Sportsperson of the Year by the Philadelphia Daily News. The Philadelphia chapter of the Baseball Writers' Association of America presented him with the "Steve Carlton Most Valuable Pitcher" and "Dallas Green Special Achievement" awards.

In 250 2/3 innings pitched, Halladay finished the 2010 regular season with a 21–10 record and a 2.44 ERA, setting a career high with 219 strikeouts while issuing just 30 walks. He led the National League in wins, innings pitched, and complete games (9), including four shutouts. He became just the seventh pitcher in the history of Major League Baseball to pitch 250 or more innings with 30 or fewer walks, the first pitcher to do so since Grover Cleveland Alexander in 1923 with the Chicago Cubs.

==== Perfect game ====
On May 29, 2010, Halladay pitched the 20th perfect game in MLB history against the Florida Marlins in Miami, retiring all 27 batters and striking out 11, allowing no hits, runs, walks, or errors.

On August 24, 2010, to commemorate his perfect game, Halladay presented around 60 Swiss-made Baume and Mercier watches he had purchased to everyone in the clubhouse. The watches were presented in brown boxes that bore the inscription: "We did it together. Thanks, Roy Halladay." Additionally, the back of each watch was engraved with the date of the game, the line score, and the individual recipient's name.

==== Postseason no-hitter ====
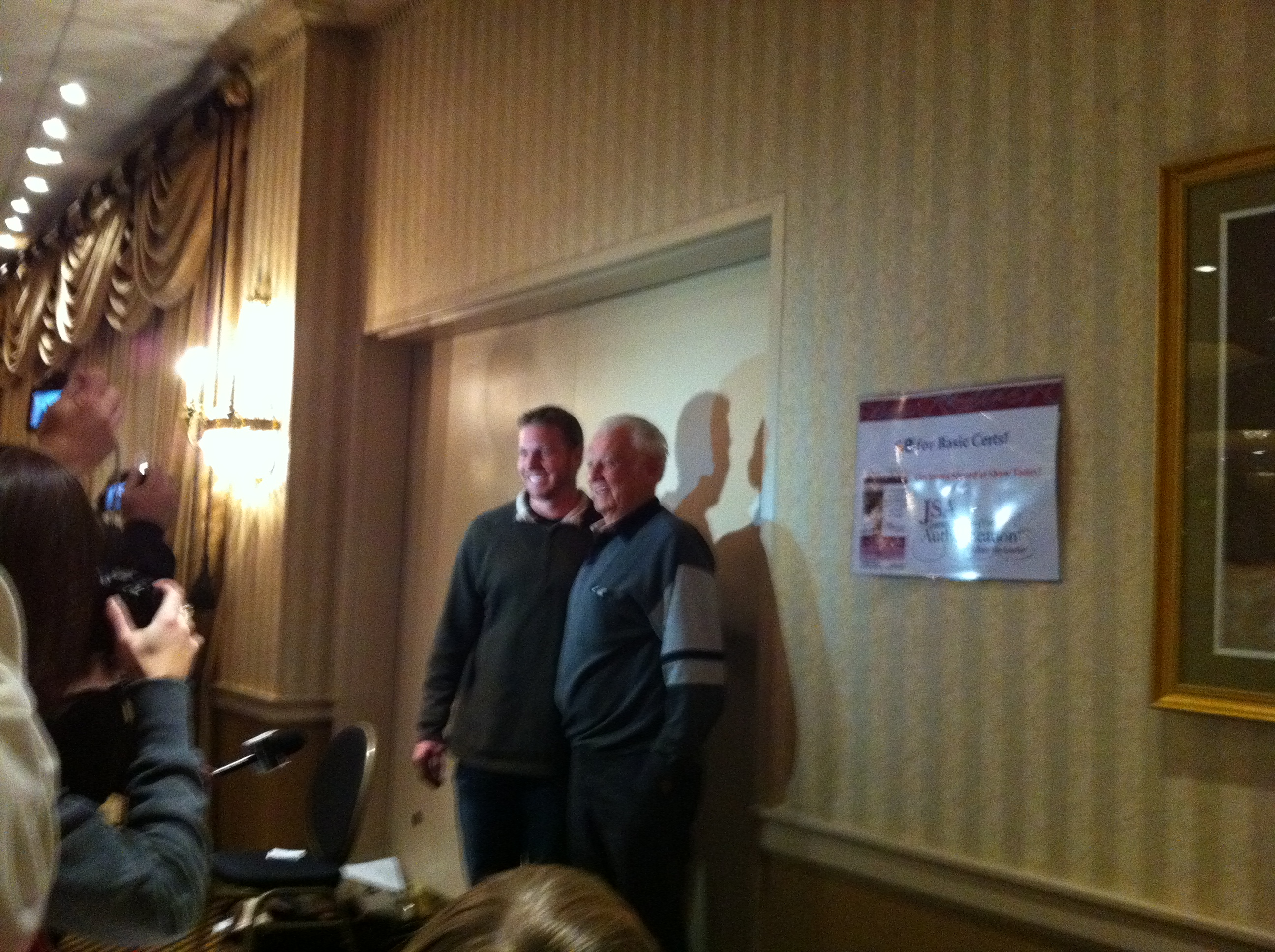
Halladay with Don Larsen, the only two pitchers to throw solo postseason no-hitters in MLB history

On October 6, 2010, in his first postseason appearance, Halladay pitched a no-hitter (his second of the season), against the Cincinnati Reds in the first game of the National League Division Series (NLDS).

He became the second player to pitch a no-hitter in the postseason, joining Don Larsen of the New York Yankees, who pitched a perfect game in the 1956 World Series. He also became the first pitcher since Nolan Ryan in 1973 to throw two no-hitters in a season, as well as the seventh pitcher to hurl both a perfect game and a regular no-hitter in his career, joining Cy Young, Addie Joss, Jim Bunning, Sandy Koufax, Randy Johnson, and Mark Buehrle. Halladay allowed just one walk to right fielder Jay Bruce with two outs in the fifth inning, and faced just one batter above the minimum.

This also marked the first time in Major League history that a pitcher threw a perfect game and another no-hitter in the same calendar year (including the postseason). The fans voted his no-hitter as the "This Year in Baseball Awards" Postseason Moment of the Year.

==== 2011 ====
For the 2011 season, Halladay was joined by Cliff Lee, who before the 2010 season had been traded away from the Phillies shortly before Halladay joined. The resulting starting pitching lineup of Halladay, Lee, Cole Hamels, Roy Oswalt and Joe Blanton had commentators dub it one of the best rotations ever assembled. Halladay, Oswalt, Lee, and Hamels were dubbed the 'Phantastic Phour' by fans and the media.

On April 24, 2011, Halladay struck out 14 and allowed just five hits in the game as his team swept the San Diego Padres in all four games. Halladay took a two-hitter into the ninth before allowing three straight singles. He allowed just one run and won, 3–1.

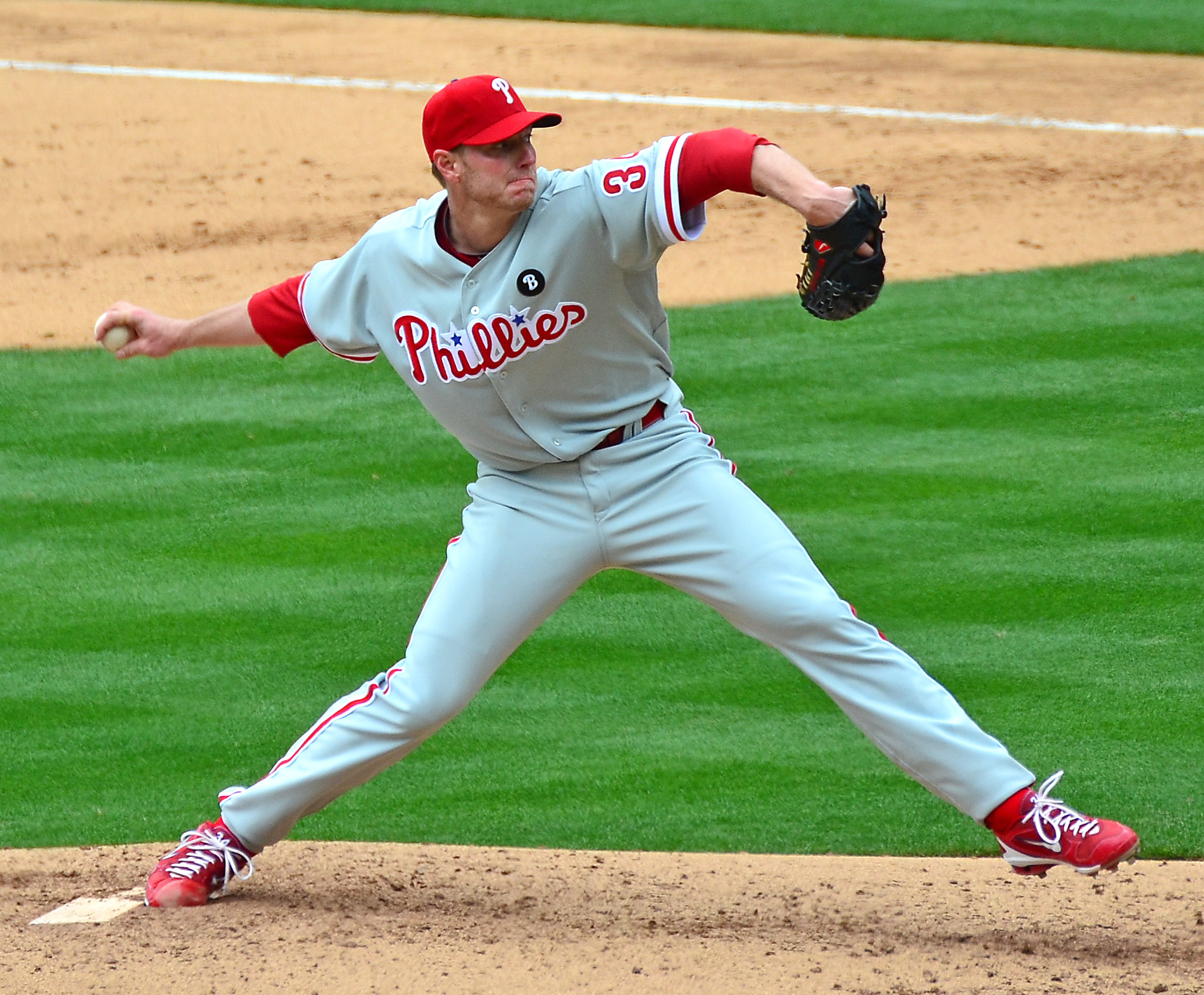
Halladay in 2011

In May, Halladay was named the 2011 winner of the John Wanamaker Athletic Award, by the Philadelphia Sports Congress, based on his 2010 season. In June, Halladay was presented the Best Major League Baseball Player ESPY Award for his performance since June 2010. He also took home the Best Moment ESPY Award for his postseason no-hitter in October 2010.

On July 12, Halladay was the NL starting pitcher in the All-Star Game. Halladay went 19–6 in 2011, with a 2.35 ERA, and pitched eight complete games, second-most in the majors. The Phillies won their fifth consecutive National League East championship and also finished with the best record in baseball for the second straight year.

Halladay was named the starter for Games 1 and 5 during the National League Division Series against the St. Louis Cardinals. He won Game 1, 11–6, but lost Game 5, 1–0, in a duel with former Blue Jays teammate and close friend Chris Carpenter. Halladay had pitched Game 5 despite having back pain. This loss eliminated the Phillies from the playoffs, a disappointment as they were touted as heavy favorites for the World Series, and it would turn out to be Halladay's final postseason appearance. Reflecting on that series at his retirement, Halladay said "I think the one thing I took away from that is you can have the best team on paper, you can have the guys who want it the most. But when the squirrel runs across home plate while your team is trying to pitch, there is nothing you can do about that."

Halladay finished second in the NL Cy Young voting to Clayton Kershaw of the Los Angeles Dodgers. He was selected as one of the three starting pitchers on the MLB Insiders Club Magazine All-Postseason Team.

In December, Halladay was named the Sportsperson of the Year by the Philadelphia Daily News for the second consecutive year.

==== 2012 ====
On April 5, 2012, Halladay threw eight innings of shutout ball against the Pittsburgh Pirates on Opening Day, giving up two hits while striking out five.

On May 29, Halladay was placed on the 15-day disabled list with a shoulder strain. It was his first DL stint since 2009. In a press conference on June 6, Halladay stated, "Ultimately, my goal is to finish my career with the Phillies and win a World Series here. Some of those things are not fully in my control, but my intent is to play here and finish my career here and be here as long as I can." Halladay stated this during his press conference about his shoulder injury, and he revealed that he would sit out three more weeks, and then re-evaluate his condition. The injury would eventually be diagnosed as a strained latissimus dorsi and Halladay was hopeful he would be able to return shortly after the All-Star break in July.

On July 17, Halladay came off the DL and was the starting pitcher against the Los Angeles Dodgers. He pitched five innings, giving up five hits and two earned runs while fanning six in a no-decision which the Phillies would go on to win, 3–2.

In a loss against the Atlanta Braves on July 29, Halladay recorded his 2,000th strikeout to become the 67th pitcher in MLB history to reach the milestone.

Although Halladay was on the DL and had the worst ERA since first starting off his career, he still remained above .500 going 11–8.

==== 2013 ====
After struggling in spring training, Halladay gave up five runs in his first start in the Phillies second game on April 3, 2013, striking out nine in 3 1/3 innings pitched. After struggling in his prior starts, Halladay pitched eight innings allowing just one run on April 14, 2013, against the Miami Marlins whom the Phillies defeated 2–1. Halladay recorded his 200th career win in the game.

On May 5, Halladay gave up nine earned runs in just 2 1/3 innings. The next day, Halladay was placed on the disabled list with a right shoulder injury. On May 8, it was announced that he would have surgery on his shoulder to have a bone spur removed. The surgery was also to address fraying of his glenoid labrum and rotator cuff. Though he was initially supposed to be making a rehab start in Double-A for the Reading Fightin' Phils that day, an 18-inning game the previous night caused the Phillies to have a shortage of pitchers and as such, Halladay returned to the major leagues on August 25 for a start against the Arizona Diamondbacks in which he threw six innings, allowing two runs on four hits with two walks and two strikeouts. He finished the season with a 6.82 ERA, his worst since 2000, and a 4–5 record in 13 starts.

=== Retirement ===
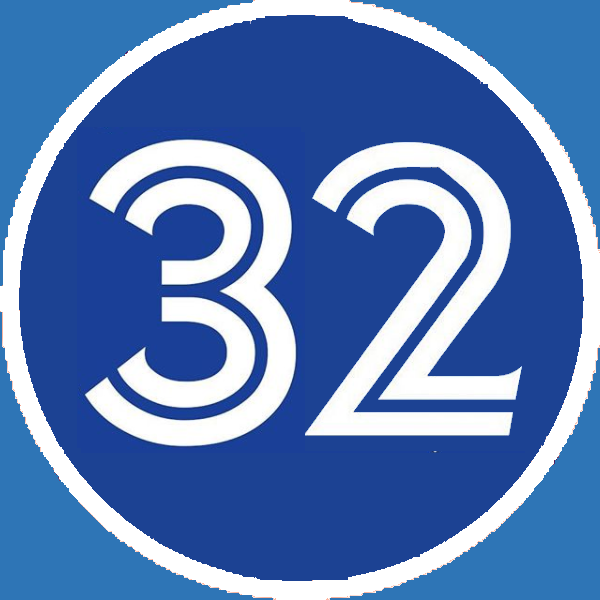
Roy Halladay's number 32 was retired by the Toronto Blue Jays in 2018.

Roy Halladay's number 34 was retired by the Philadelphia Phillies in 2021.

On December 9, 2013, Halladay signed a ceremonial one-day contract with the Blue Jays and announced his retirement from baseball due to injury. At his press conference, Halladay listed a persistent back injury, as well as wanting to be more involved with his family, as his reasons for retiring.

Although retired as a player, Halladay continued to be a part of the game as a guest instructor for the Philadelphia Phillies and Toronto Blue Jays. The Phillies hired Halladay as a "mental skills coach" in March 2017. Halladay also volunteered as a baseball coach at Calvary Christian High School in Clearwater, Florida where his oldest son played baseball.

== Approach to pitching ==
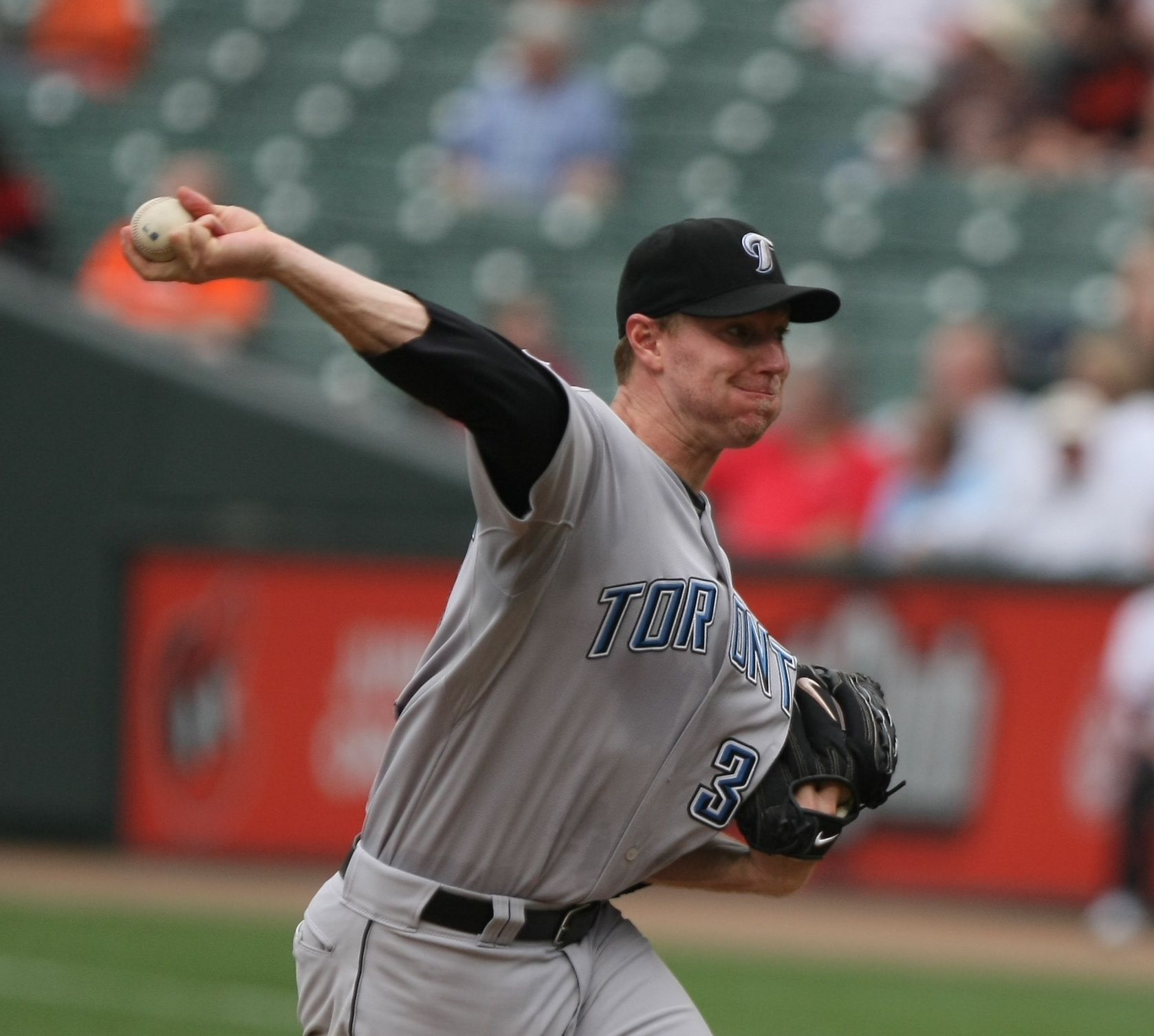
Halladay in 2009, showing his characteristic sinker grip

Halladay's distinctiveness was characterized by his ability to throw a hard sinker ranging in the low 90s with pinpoint control. In addition, he threw a four-seam fastball in the low 90s, a curveball in the high 70s, and cut fastball from 90 to 92 mph for which he had modified his grip in 2007 at the suggestion of former catcher Sal Fasano. Halladay threw the hardest cutter among MLB starters in the 2011 season, at an average of 91.4 mph. The changeup was one pitch that Halladay had problems commanding for many years, and which he used very rarely. However, after joining the Phillies in 2010, Halladay started throwing a changeup that was a variation of the split-finger fastball (called a split-changeup). The pitch was introduced to Halladay by pitching coach Rich Dubee.

Despite his reputation as a ground ball pitcher who worked at an efficient pace, Halladay's strikeout totals increased steadily in the few final years of his career. Halladay's efficiency and durability were reflected in his total innings pitched every year, also due to his ability to strike out hitters and induce ground ball outs to escape jams. He often led the league in innings pitched and complete games, while ranking among the leaders in WHIP and ERA. Among pitchers since 1900 to have won 200 games, Halladay has the least amount of walks issued with 592.

Prior to and during each start, Halladay had a distinct trademark in which he went into a complete "isolation mode," immersing himself in complete concentration in order to plan every pitch he would throw while on the mound. During this time, he would not talk to anyone except the manager or the pitching coach. He would not even reply to a "hello" or wave from a teammate or spectator, nor talk to the media until he had been relieved or completed the game.

== Personal life ==
Halladay had two children, Braden and Ryan, with his wife, Brandy (née Gates). During the offseason, Halladay lived with his family in Tarpon Springs, Florida. Halladay's older son, Braden, committed to play baseball at Penn State shortly after Halladay's death. Braden, who was born in Toronto, was invited to Baseball Canada's U18 spring training camp on March 6, 2018, and pitched a scoreless inning in the Canadian Junior team's exhibition game against the Blue Jays on March 17. In the 2019 MLB draft, as a tribute to Halladay, Braden was selected by the Blue Jays in the 32nd round.

While he was a member of the Toronto Blue Jays, Halladay and his wife invited children and their families from the Hospital for Sick Children into "Doc's Box" at Rogers Centre during Blue Jays games. The remodeling of the suite to be more kid-friendly was documented in an episode of Design Inc. As part of Halladay's contract with the Blue Jays, he also donated $100,000 each year to the Jays Care Foundation.

Halladay was the Blue Jays' nominee numerous times for the Roberto Clemente Award for his work with underprivileged children. For the same reason, he was also the Blue Jays' nominee in 2008 for the Players Choice Awards Marvin Miller Man of the Year Award.

Halladay was the cover athlete for Major League Baseball 2K11.

== Death ==
On November 7, 2017, Halladay died when the Icon A5 Founders Edition amphibious aircraft he was piloting crashed into the Gulf of Mexico. The Pasco County, Florida, Sheriff's Office confirmed that Halladay was the only occupant of the aircraft and that air traffic controllers had not received any mayday distress signals before the crash. The crash was reported to have happened about 0.25 mi (0.40 km) off the coast of New Port Richey, Florida, in water 4 feet (1.22 m) deep.

The Pasco Sheriff's Office Marine Unit responded to the accident after a call at noon, reporting that a sport plane had crashed upside-down into shallow water. The plane was reported to be Halladay's, and he had tweeted four weeks earlier about his excitement about acquiring the plane, which was reportedly registered in the name of Halladay's father, a retired commercial pilot.

An autopsy report by the Pinellas-Pasco Medical Examiner's Office released in January 2018 revealed that Halladay's blood contained morphine, hydromorphone, amphetamine, fluoxetine (an antidepressant), baclofen (a muscle relaxant), and zolpidem (a sleep aid sold under the brand name Ambien). According to forensic pathologist Burr Hartman, "He had a drug combination similar to a speedball. He was impaired by these drugs. It was definitely not safe for him to fly an airplane." On April 15, 2020, the National Transportation Safety Board (NTSB) released a report stating that in addition to the drugs, Halladay was executing aerobatics including steep climbs and turns, and the plane sometimes came within 5 feet (1.5 m) of the water before a final climb caused its speed to fall to 85 mph (137 km/h), after which it nosedived into the sea and Halladay was killed by blunt force trauma and drowning. The NTSB determined the probable cause of the crash to be the "pilot's improper decision to perform aggressive, low-altitude maneuvers due to his impairment from the use of multiple psychoactive substances, which resulted in a loss of control".

Halladay and his wife, Brandy, appeared in a since-removed promotional video for the aircraft with her stating her strong objections to him buying the plane.

== Legacy ==
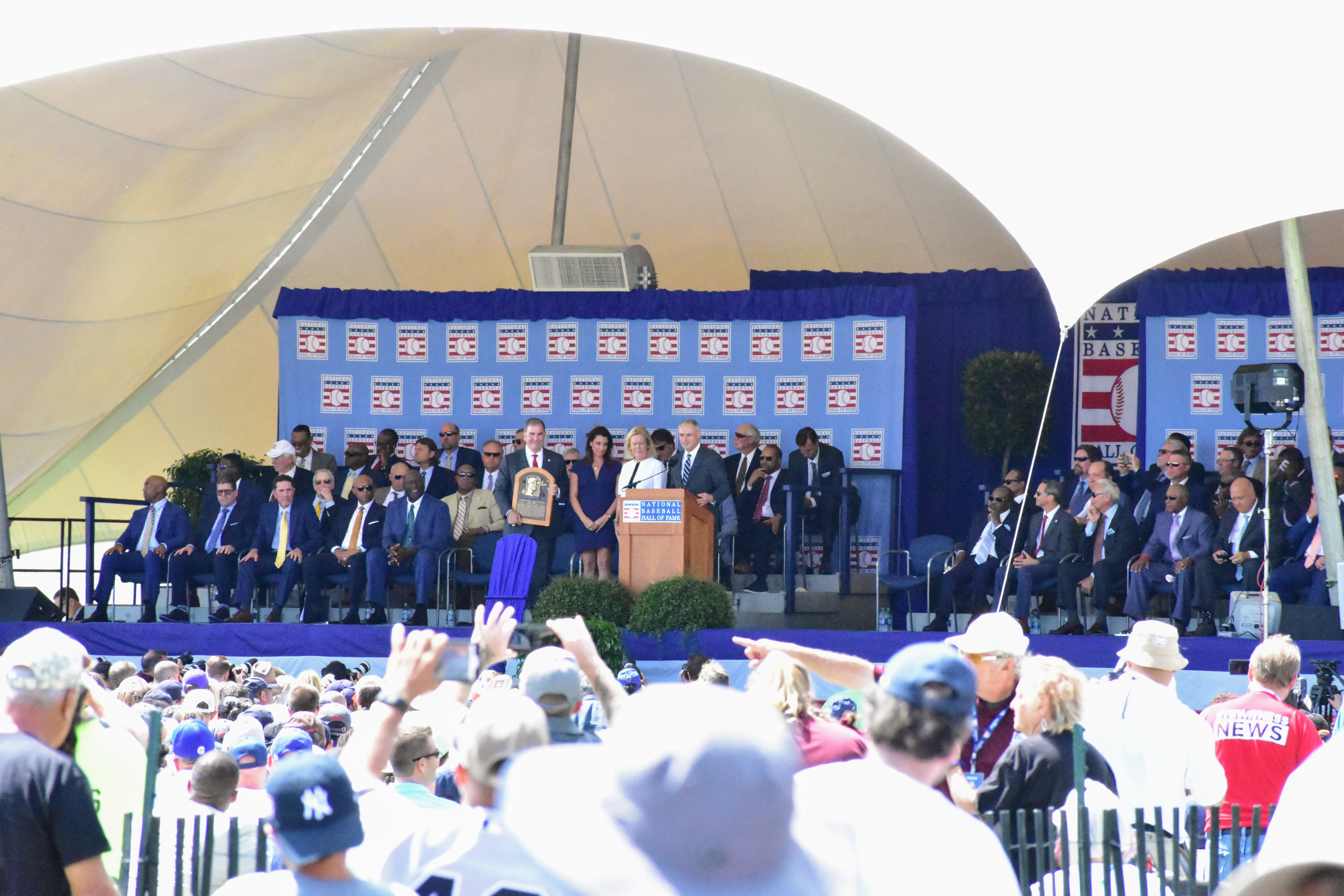
Halladay's widow Brandy receiving his plaque during his induction ceremony into the Baseball Hall of Fame in 2019

In late 2017, the Phillies announced that use of uniform number 34 would be suspended for the 2018 season to honor Halladay. The Toronto Blue Jays retired Halladay's number 32 during a pregame ceremony on Opening Day of the 2018 season.

Halladay was elected to the Canadian Baseball Hall of Fame in 2017 and the Baseball Hall of Fame and Museum on January 22, 2019 in his first year of eligibility, garnering 85.41% of the vote. His wife and sons announced that they did not choose a logo for his cap, which leaves Roberto Alomar as the sole Cooperstown inductee as a Blue Jay. However, Halladay had said that, if given the choice, he wanted to be inducted as a Blue Jay.

On March 2, 2019, Phillies free-agent acquisition Bryce Harper, who wore uniform number 34 from his debut with the Washington Nationals in 2012, announced that he would not wear the number 34 as a member of the Phillies, stating that "Roy Halladay should be the last one to wear it" for the Phillies. Harper chose to wear number 3 instead.

On February 4, 2020, the Phillies announced they would retire Halladay's number 34 on May 29, 2020, the tenth anniversary of his perfect game. However, due to the COVID-19 pandemic, the number retirement was postponed. The Phillies instead retired Halladay's number during a pregame ceremony on August 8, 2021. At the ceremony, his former teammates Carlos Ruiz and Raul Ibanez were in attendance, along with his former manager Charlie Manuel. Steve Carlton, a fellow Hall of Fame pitcher for the Phillies, unveiled Halladay's number 34 display at the stadium. In the Phillies game that day, Phillies pitcher Zack Wheeler pitched a two-hit, complete game shutout in a 3–0 victory against the New York Mets, and became the first Phillies pitcher to retire 22 consecutive batters in a game since Halladay himself did so during his perfect game in 2010. When asked about Halladay after the game, Wheeler responded: "Today was his day, and I just tried to pitch like him."

On May 14, 2021, on what would've been Halladay's 44th birthday, Jays Care Foundation announced the naming of Toronto's first accessible baseball diamond as Roy Halladay Field. Located at Highview Park in the Birch Cliff neighborhood of Scarborough, Roy Halladay Field is used by athletes in Jays Care's Challenger Baseball program, an adaptive baseball program for Canadian kids living with cognitive and/or physical disabilities.

== See also ==
- List of fatalities from aviation accidents
- List of highest paid Major League Baseball players
- List of Major League Baseball annual ERA leaders
- List of Major League Baseball annual shutout leaders
- List of Major League Baseball annual wins leaders
- List of Major League Baseball career putouts as a pitcher leaders
- List of Major League Baseball career strikeout leaders
- List of Major League Baseball career wins leaders
- List of Major League Baseball no-hitters
- List of Philadelphia Phillies award winners and league leaders
- List of Toronto Blue Jays team records
- Toronto Blue Jays award winners and league leaders

Achievements
Preceded by Cliff Lee	American League All-Star Game Starting Pitcher; 2009	Succeeded by David Price
Preceded by Ubaldo Jiménez	National League All-Star Game Starting Pitcher; 2011	Succeeded by Matt Cain
Preceded by Dallas Braden	Perfect game pitcher May 29, 2010	Succeeded by Philip Humber
Preceded by Dallas Braden; Matt Garza	No-hitter pitcher May 29, 2010; October 6, 2010	Succeeded by Edwin Jackson; Francisco Liriano
Preceded by Don Larsen	Postseason no-hitter pitcher October 6, 2010	Succeeded by Cristian Javier, Bryan Abreu, Rafael Montero, & Ryan Pressly
