= 1907 South Atlantic League season =

- League: South Atlantic League
- Sport: Baseball
- Duration: April 8 – September 4
- Number of games: 130
- Number of teams: 6

Regular season
- League champions: Charleston Sea Gulls

SAL seasons
- ← 1906 1908 →

The 1907 South Atlantic League was a Class C baseball season played between April 8 and September 4. Six teams played a 130-game schedule, with the top team winning the pennant.

The Charleston Sea Gulls won the South Atlantic League championship, as they finished the regular season in first place.

== Team changes ==
- The Macon Brigands are renamed to the Macon Peaches.

== Teams ==
1907 South Atlantic League
Team	City	MLB Affiliate	Stadium
Augusta Tourists	Augusta, Georgia	None	Warren Park
Charleston Sea Gulls	Charleston, South Carolina	None	Hampton Park Field
Columbia Gamecocks	Columbia, South Carolina	None	Comer Field
Jacksonville Jays	Jacksonville, Florida	None	Dixieland Park
Macon Peaches	Macon, Georgia	None	Central City Park
Savannah Indians	Savannah, Georgia	None	Bolton Street Park

== Map of teams ==
South Atlantic League teams

== Regular season ==
=== Summary ===
- The Charleston Sea Gulls finished with the best record in the regular season, winning their first South Atlantic League pennant.

=== Standings ===
South Atlantic League
Team	Win	Loss	%	GB
Charleston Sea Gulls	75	46	.620	–
Jacksonville Jays	68	51	.571	6
Macon Peaches	68	54	.557	7½
Augusta Tourists	59	61	.492	15½
Savannah Indians	56	63	.471	18
Columbia Gamecocks	36	87	.293	41

== League Leaders ==
=== Batting leaders ===
Stat	Player	Total
AVG	Tom Raftery, Charleston Sea Gulls	.301
H	Tom Raftery, Charleston Sea Gulls	128

=== Pitching leaders ===
Stat	Player	Total
W	Bugs Raymond, Charleston Sea Gulls	35

== See also ==
- 1907 Major League Baseball season
