= Girard Sailors =

Minor league baseball team in Girard, Ohio (1908)

- 1908; Girard, Ohio

Minor league affiliations
- Previous classes: Class C
- League: Ohio–Pennsylvania League

Team data
- Previous names: Erie Sailors (June 15, 1908–1916); Butler (May 19, 1908 – June 15, 1908); Girard Sailors (May – May 19, 1908)

The Girard Sailors were a short-lived minor league baseball team that existed briefly in 1908. The team represented Girard, Ohio as a member of the Ohio–Pennsylvania League.

After losing their first nine games, the team moved to Butler, Pennsylvania, on May 19, 1908. Less than a month later, on June 15, 1908, the club moved again, to Erie, Pennsylvania. They finished the 1908 season as the Erie Sailors, and stayed in Erie for their remaining years in the Ohio-Pennsylvania League.

== Year-by-year record ==
Year	Record	Finish	Manager	Playoffs
1908	0-9 (42-79 overall)	8th	Daniel Koster, Walter East & Dick Nallin	The Sailors moved to Butler on May 9 Butler moved to become the Erie Sailors on June 15
