= 1908 South Atlantic League season =

- League: South Atlantic League
- Sport: Baseball
- Duration: April 6 – August 22
- Number of games: 120
- Number of teams: 6

Regular season
- League champions: Jacksonville Jays

SAL seasons
- ← 1907 1909 →

The 1908 South Atlantic League was a Class C baseball season played between April 6 and August 22. Six teams played a 120-game schedule, with the top team winning the pennant.

The Jacksonville Jays won the South Atlantic League championship, as they finished the regular season in first place.

== Teams ==
1908 South Atlantic League
Team	City	MLB Affiliate	Stadium
Augusta Tourists	Augusta, Georgia	None	Warren Park
Charleston Sea Gulls	Charleston, South Carolina	None	Hampton Park Field
Columbia Gamecocks	Columbia, South Carolina	None	Comer Field
Jacksonville Jays	Jacksonville, Florida	None	Dixieland Park
Macon Peaches	Macon, Georgia	None	Central City Park
Savannah Indians	Savannah, Georgia	None	Bolton Street Park

== Map of teams ==
South Atlantic League teams

== Regular season ==
=== Summary ===
- The Jacksonville Jays finished with the best record in the regular season, winning their first South Atlantic League pennant.

=== Standings ===
South Atlantic League
Team	Win	Loss	%	GB
Jacksonville Jays	77	34	.694	–
Savannah Indians	64	45	.587	12
Augusta Tourists	51	59	.464	25½
Columbia Gamecocks	46	58	.442	27½
Macon Peaches	48	68	.414	31½
Charleston Sea Gulls	44	66	.400	32½

== League Leaders ==
=== Batting leaders ===
Stat	Player	Total
AVG	Wilbur Murdoch, Macon Peaches	.302
H	Wilbur Murdoch, Macon Peaches	140
R	Frank Bigbie, Columbia Gamecocks	55
SB	Louis Pelkey, Savannah Indians	59

=== Pitching leaders ===
Stat	Player	Total
W	Phil Sitton, Augusta Tourists; Abe Welcher, Columbia Gamecocks	19

== See also ==
- 1908 Major League Baseball season
