= List of Chicago White Sox no-hitters =

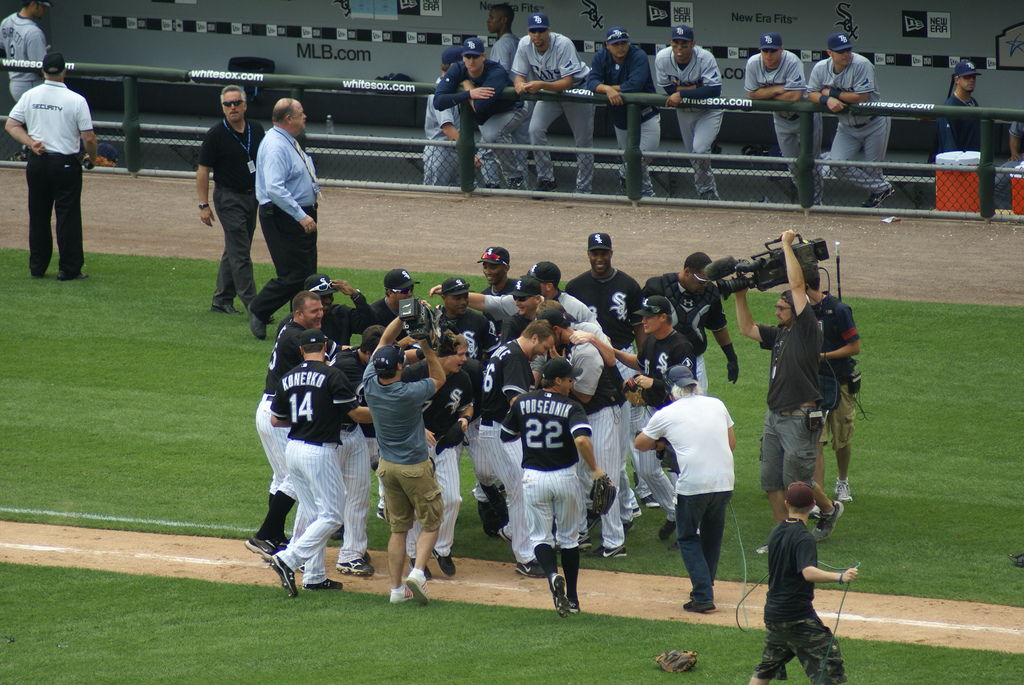
Mark Buehrle threw the eighteenth perfect game in MLB history on July 23, 2009 against the Tampa Bay Rays.

The Chicago White Sox are a Major League Baseball franchise based in Chicago. They play in the American League Central division. Pitchers for the White Sox have thrown twenty no-hitters in franchise history. A no-hitter is officially recognized by Major League Baseball only "when a pitcher (or pitchers) allows no hits during the entire course of a game, which consists of at least nine innings. In a no-hit game, a batter may reach base via a walk, an error, a hit by pitch, a passed ball or wild pitch on strike three, or catcher's interference." No-hitters of less than nine complete innings were previously recognized by the league as official; however, several rule alterations in 1991 changed the rule to its current form. Three perfect games, a special subcategory of no-hitter, have been pitched in White Sox history, which equals the New York Yankees for the most perfect games pitched by any MLB franchise. As defined by Major League Baseball, "in a perfect game, no batter reaches any base during the course of the game." These feats were achieved by Charlie Robertson in 1922, which was the first perfect game on the road in MLB history, Mark Buehrle in 2009, and Philip Humber in 2012.

Nixey Callahan threw the first no-hitter in White Sox history on September 20, 1902; the most recent no-hitter was thrown by Carlos Rodón on April 14, 2021. Only three left-handed pitchers have thrown no-hitters in franchise history and four of the six most recent no-hitters: Wilson Álvarez (in 1991), Buehrle (in 2007 and 2009), Rodón (in 2021). The other 17 pitchers were right-handed. Two pitchers have thrown more than one no-hitter in a White Sox uniform, Frank Smith and Buehrle. Twelve no-hitters were thrown at home and eight on the road. They threw five in April, one in May, one in June, two in July, six in August, and five in September. The longest interval between no-hitters was between the games pitched by Bill Dietrich and Bob Keegan, encompassing twenty years, two months, and nineteen days from June 1, 1937 till August 20, 1957. Conversely, the shortest interval between no-hitters was between the games pitched by Lucas Giolito and Rodón, encompassing seven months and twenty days from August 25, 2020 until April 14, 2021. They no-hit the Detroit Tigers the most, which occurred four times, which were defeated by Callahan in 1902, Smith in 1905, Robertson in 1920, and Joel Horlen in 1967. There have been three no-hitters which the team allowed at least a run, one by Joe Benz, a combined no-hitter by Blue Moon Odom and Francisco Barrios, and most recently by Joe Cowley in 1986. The most baserunners allowed in a White Sox no-hitter was a combined no-hitter by Odom and Barrios (in 1976), who allowed 12. Of the twenty no-hitters, four have been won by a score of 6–0, more common than any other results. The largest margin of victory in a White Sox no-hitter was a 15–0 win by Frank Smith in 1905. The smallest margin of victory was a 1–0 win by Smith in 1908 and by Odom and Barrios who combined to throw a no-hitter in a 2–1 victory in 1976.

The umpire is also an integral part of any no-hitter. The task of the umpire in a baseball game is to make any decision "which involves judgment, such as, but not limited to, whether a batted ball is fair or foul, whether a pitch is a strike or a ball, or whether a runner is safe or out... [the umpire's judgment on such matters] is final." Part of the duties of the umpire making calls at home plate includes defining the strike zone, which "is defined as that area over homeplate (sic) the upper limit of which is a horizontal line at the midpoint between the top of the shoulders and the top of the uniform pants, and the lower level is a line at the hollow beneath the kneecap." These calls define every baseball game and are therefore integral to the completion of any no-hitter. Sixteen different umpires presided over the White Sox’ twenty no-hitters. Notably Eric Cooper umpired both Buehrle's no-hitters, and Doug Eddings, who umpired Carlos Rodón's no-hitter, was also the umpire of the White Sox' 2005 American League Championship Series game 2 win over Los Angeles involving the infamous dropped third strike call.

The manager is another integral part of any no-hitter. The tasks of the manager include determining the starting rotation as well as the batting order and defensive lineup every game. Seventeen different managers have led the team during the White Sox’ twenty no-hitters.

== No-hitters ==
¶	Indicates a perfect game
£	Pitcher was left-handed
*	Member of the National Baseball Hall of Fame and Museum

#	Date	Pitcher	Final score	Base- runners	Opponent	Catcher	Plate umpire	Manager	Notes	Ref
1	September 20, 1902	Nixey Callahan	3–0	3	Detroit Tigers	Billy Sullivan (1)	Bob Caruthers	Clark Griffith	First no-hitter in franchise history; First no-hitter at home (South Side Park); First right-handed pitcher to throw a no-hitter in franchise history; First no-hitter in American League history; Tied for the latest calendar date of White Sox no-hitter (tie)	
2	September 6, 1905	Frank Smith (1)	15–0	3	@ Detroit Tigers	Ed McFarland	Silk O'Loughlin (1)	Fielder Jones (1)	First White Sox no-hitter on the road; Largest margin of victory in a White Sox no-hitter	
3	September 20, 1908	Frank Smith (2)	1–0	4	Philadelphia Athletics	Billy Sullivan (2)	Rip Egan (1)	Fielder Jones (2)	Smallest margin of victory in a White Sox no-hitter (tie); Tied for the latest calendar date of White Sox no-hitter (tie)	
4	August 27, 1911	Ed Walsh*	5–0	2	Boston Red Sox	Bruno Block	Billy Evans	Hugh Duffy	First White Sox no-hitter at White Sox Park (later known as Comiskey Park)	
5	May 31, 1914	Joe Benz	6–1	5	Cleveland Naps	Ray Schalk (1)	Rip Egan (2)	Nixey Callahan	First White Sox no-hitter while allowing a run	
6	April 14, 1917	Eddie Cicotte	11–0	6	@ St. Louis Browns	Ray Schalk (2)	Silk O'Loughlin (2)	Pants Rowland	Tied for the earliest calendar date of White Sox no-hitter (tied)	
7	April 30, 1922	Charlie Robertson^{¶}	2–0	0	@ Detroit Tigers	Ray Schalk (3)	Dick Nallin	Kid Gleason	First perfect game in White Sox history and fifth in MLB history; See also: Charlie Robertson's perfect game	
8	August 21, 1926	Ted Lyons*	6–0	2	@ Boston Red Sox	Johnny Grabowski	Bill McGowan	Eddie Collins		
9	August 31, 1935	Vern Kennedy	5–0	4	Cleveland Indians	Luke Sewell (1)	Bill Summers	Jimmy Dykes (1)		
10	June 1, 1937	Bill Dietrich	8–0	2	St. Louis Browns	Luke Sewell (2)	Cal Hubbard	Jimmy Dykes (2)		
11	August 20, 1957	Bob Keegan	6–0	2	Washington Senators	Sherm Lollar	Johnny Stevens	Al Lopez	Longest interval between no-hitters in franchise history; Second game of a doubleheader	
12	September 10, 1967	Joel Horlen	6–0	2	Detroit Tigers	J. C. Martin	Jerry Neudecker	Eddie Stanky	First game of a doubleheader; Second no-hitter at White Sox Park	
13	July 28, 1976	Blue Moon Odom (5 IP) & Francisco Barrios (4 IP)	2–1	12	@ Oakland Athletics	Jim Essian	Russ Goetz	Paul Richards	Smallest margin of victory in a White Sox no-hitter (tie); Most baserunners allowed in a White Sox no-hitter	
14	September 19, 1986	Joe Cowley	7–1	7	@ California Angels	Ron Karkovice (1)	Rick Reed (1)	Jim Fregosi	Last win of his career	
15	August 11, 1991	Wilson Álvarez^{£}	7–0	6	@ Baltimore Orioles	Ron Karkovice (2)	Rick Reed (2)	Jeff Torborg	Second career game; second career start; First left-handed pitcher to throw a no-hitter in franchise history	
16	April 18, 2007	Mark Buehrle^{£} (1)	6–0	1	Texas Rangers	A. J. Pierzynski (1)	Eric Cooper (1)	Ozzie Guillén (1)	First no-hitter since U.S. Cellular Field (formerly Comiskey Park II) was opened in 1991	
17	July 23, 2009	Mark Buehrle^{£¶} (2)	5–0	0	Tampa Bay Rays	Ramón Castro	Eric Cooper (2)	Ozzie Guillén (2)	Second perfect game in White Sox history and eighteenth in MLB history; See also: Mark Buehrle's perfect game	
18	April 21, 2012	Philip Humber^{¶}	4–0	0	@ Seattle Mariners	A. J. Pierzynski (2)	Brian Runge	Robin Ventura	Third perfect game in White Sox history and 21st in MLB history; See also: Philip Humber's perfect game	
19	August 25, 2020	Lucas Giolito	4–0	1	Pittsburgh Pirates	James McCann	C. B. Bucknor	Rick Renteria	13 strike outs were the most in a no-hitter in franchise history	
20	April 14, 2021	Carlos Rodón^{£}	8–0	1	Cleveland Indians	Zack Collins	Doug Eddings	Tony La Russa	Carried a perfect game until the 9th inning, with a Cleveland hitter hit by pitch; Tied for the earliest calendar date of White Sox no-hitter (tied); Shortest interval between no-hitters in franchise history	

== See also ==
- List of Major League Baseball no-hitters
