= List of Baltimore Orioles no-hitters =

The Baltimore Orioles are a Major League Baseball franchise based in Baltimore, Maryland. They play in the American League East division, and were previously known in earlier years as the “Milwaukee Brewers” (1901) and “St. Louis Browns” (1902 to 1953). Pitchers for the Orioles have thrown ten no-hitters in franchise history. A no-hitter is officially recognized by Major League Baseball only "when a pitcher (or pitchers) allows no hits during the entire course of a game, which consists of at least nine innings", though one or more batters "may reach base via a walk, an error, a hit by pitch, a passed ball or wild pitch on strike three, or catcher's interference". No-hitters of less than nine complete innings were previously recognized by the league as official; however, several rule alterations in 1991 changed the rule to its current form. No perfect games, a special subcategory of no-hitter, have been thrown in Orioles history. As defined by Major League Baseball, "in a perfect game, no batter reaches any base during the course of the game."

Earl Hamilton threw the first no-hitter in Orioles history on August 30, 1912; the most recent no-hitter was thrown by John Means on May 5, 2021. No-hitters have been thrown by five left-handed starting pitchers and five right-handers. Seven no-hitters were thrown at home and three on the road. There have been two no-hitters in April, four in May, one in July, two in August, and one in September. The longest interval between no-hitters was 36 years from May 6, 1917 (Bob Groom) to May 6, 1953 (Bobo Holloman). The shortest interval was one day, May 5, 1917 (Ernie Koob) to May 6, 1917 (Groom). The franchise no-hit the Oakland Athletics (formerly “Philadelphia Athletics”) the most, three times, by Holloman in 1953, Jim Palmer in 1969, and a combined no-hitter by Milacki, Flanagan, Williamson, and Olson in 1991. In two no-hitters, the team allowed at least one run: by Hamilton in 1912 (which was a loss) and a combined no-hitter by Steve Barber and Stu Miller in 1967. The most baserunners allowed in a no-hitter was a combined no-no by Barber and Miller, who allowed 14 in a 2–1 loss to the Detroit Tigers in 1967. Of the ten no-hitters, two have been won by a score of 1–0 and two by a score of 6–0, more common than any other result. The largest margin of victory was an 8–0 win by Palmer in 1969. The smallest margin of victory was a 1–0 wins by Koob in 1917 and Hoyt Wilhelm in 1958.

The umpire is an integral part of any no-hitter. The umpire makes any decision “which involves judgment, such as, but not limited to, whether a batted ball is fair or foul, whether a pitch is a strike or a ball, or whether a runner is safe or out… [the umpire’s judgment on such matters] is final." Part of the duties of the umpire making calls at home plate includes defining the strike zone, which "is defined as that area over homeplate (sic) the upper limit of which is a horizontal line at the midpoint between the top of the shoulders and the top of the uniform pants, and the lower level is a line at the hollow beneath the kneecap.” These calls define every baseball game and are therefore integral to the completion of any no-hitter. Eight different umpires presided over each of the franchise’s ten no-hitters.

The manager is another integral part of a no-hitter. For every game, the manager determines the starting rotation (who pitches in each game) as well as the batting order and defensive lineup. A manager’s decisions can contribute to a no-hitter. Eight different managers have overseen the franchise’s ten no-hitters.

== List of no-hitters in Browns/Orioles history ==
| ¶ | Indicates a perfect game |
| ^ | Team who threw no-hitter lost the game |
| £ | Pitcher was left-handed |
| * | Member of the National Baseball Hall of Fame and Museum |

| # | Date | Pitcher | Final score | Base- runners | Opponent | Catcher | Plate umpire | Manager | Notes | Ref |
|---|---|---|---|---|---|---|---|---|---|---|
| 1 | August 30, 1912 | Earl Hamilton | 5–1 | 5 | @ Detroit Tigers | Ossee Schreck | Silk O'Loughlin | George Stovall | First no-hitter in franchise history; First no-hitter on the road in franchise history; First right-handed pitcher to throw a no-hitter in franchise history; First franchise no-hitter while allowing a run | |
| 2 | May 5, 1917 | Ernie Koob^{£} | 1–0 | 3 | Chicago White Sox | Hank Severeid (1) | Dick Nallin (1) | Fielder Jones (1) | First no-hitter at home in franchise history; First left-handed pitcher to throw a no-hitter in franchise history | |
| 3 | May 6, 1917 | Bob Groom | 3–0 | 1 | Chicago White Sox | Hank Severeid (2) | Dick Nallin (2) | Fielder Jones (2) | The same teams, in the same park, on the next day as the previous no-hitter, but the second game of a doubleheader. The White Sox went on to win the 1917 World Series—to date, the only time a team won a World Series after being no-hit twice in the same season.; Shortest interval between franchise no-hitters | |
| 4 | May 6, 1953 | Bobo Holloman | 6–0 | 5 | Philadelphia Athletics | Les Moss | Jim Duffy | Marty Marion | Longest interval between franchise no-hitters; Only pitcher in modern history, and in American League history, to throw a no-hitter in first major-league start.; Final no-hitter as the St. Louis Browns | |
| 5 | September 20, 1958 | Hoyt Wilhelm* | 1–0 | 2 | New York Yankees | Gus Triandos | Joe Paparella | Paul Richards | First no-hitter as the Baltimore Orioles; Smallest margin of victory in a franchise no-hitter; Wilhelm had pitched exclusively in relief prior to this season; this was only his ninth career start; Latest calendar date of franchise no-hitter | |
| 6 | April 30, 1967 | Steve Barber^{£} (8 2/3 IP); Stu Miller (1/3 IP) | 1–2^{^} | 14 | Detroit Tigers | Andy Etchebarren | Bill Valentine | Hank Bauer (1) | First game of a doubleheader; 9-inning home loss; Most baserunners allowed in a franchise no-hitter; The Tigers scored both runs in the ninth and final inning on walks, a wild pitch and an error. | |
| 7 | April 27, 1968 | Tom Phoebus | 6–0 | 3 | Boston Red Sox | Curt Blefary | Frank Umont | Hank Bauer (2) | Shortest interval between franchise no-hitters (as Baltimore Orioles); Earliest calendar date of franchise no-hitter | |
| 8 | August 13, 1969 | Jim Palmer* | 8–0 | 8 | Oakland Athletics | Ellie Hendricks | Lou DiMuro | Earl Weaver | Palmer had just come off the disabled list four days earlier; Largest margin of victory in a franchise no-hitter; Home plate umpire Lou DiMuro’s son Mike was an umpire for Roy Halladay's perfect game in 2010 | |
| 9 | July 13, 1991 | Bob Milacki (6 IP); Mike Flanagan^{£} (1 IP); Mark Williamson (1 IP); Gregg Olson (1 IP) | 2–0 | 4 | @ Oakland Athletics | Chris Hoiles | Chuck Meriwether | Johnny Oates | Most recent combined no-hitter in franchise history | |
| 10 | May 5, 2021 | John Means | 6–0 | 1 | @ Seattle Mariners | Pedro Severino | Tim Timmons | Brandon Hyde | The only baserunner reached on a third strike wild pitch in the 3rd inning; First non-perfect no-hitter in MLB history in which the opposing team did not reach base by a walk, hit-by-pitch, or fielding error | |
