= John Means (baseball) =

American baseball player (born 1993)

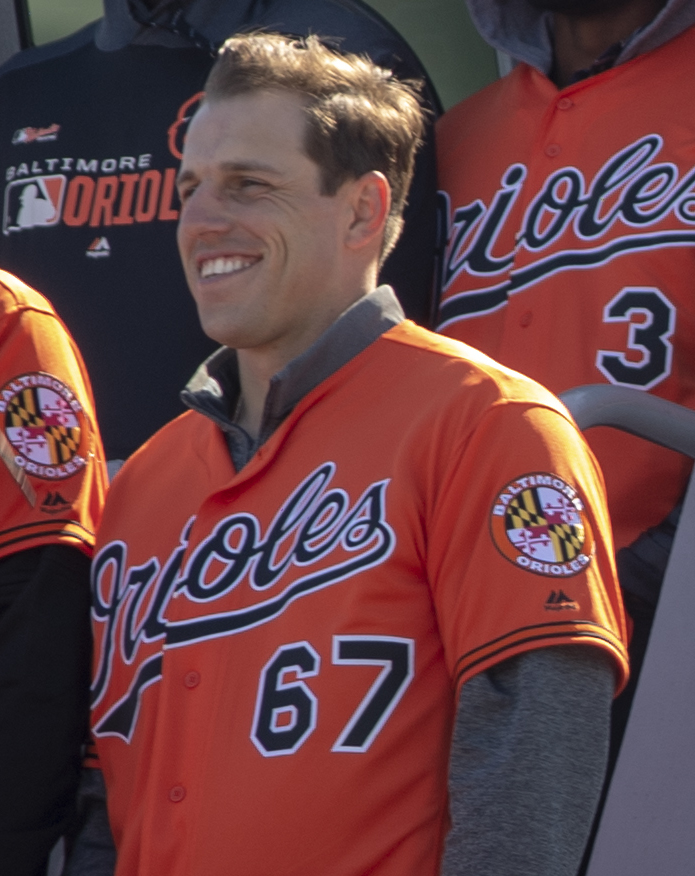
- Means with the Baltimore Orioles in 2019

Kansas City Royals
- Pitcher
- Born: April 24, 1993 (age 33); Olathe, Kansas, U.S.
- Bats: Left Throws: Left

MLB debut
- September 26, 2018, for the Baltimore Orioles

MLB statistics (through 2024 season)
- Win–loss record: 23–26
- Earned run average: 3.68
- Strikeouts: 334
- Stats at Baseball Reference

Teams
- Baltimore Orioles (2018–2024)

Career highlights and awards
- All-Star (2019); Pitched a no-hitter on May 5, 2021

John Alan Means (born April 24, 1993) is an American professional baseball pitcher in the Kansas City Royals organization. He has previously played in Major League Baseball (MLB) for the Baltimore Orioles. The Orioles selected Means in the 11th round of the 2014 MLB draft. He made his MLB debut in 2018.

Means was an All-Star in 2019. He threw the tenth no-hitter in Orioles franchise history on May 5, 2021.

== Career ==
=== Amateur and minor league career ===
Means attended Gardner Edgerton High School in Gardner, Kansas. He played for the school's baseball team, but was not recruited by any NCAA Division I college baseball program. The Atlanta Braves selected him in the 46th round of the 2011 MLB draft. He intended to sign with the Braves, but was injured when a Braves scout visited him, and the scout recommended he go to college. Means enrolled at Fort Scott Community College and played baseball at the junior college level for one year, before he transferred to West Virginia University to play for the West Virginia Mountaineers. In 2013, he played collegiate summer baseball with the Falmouth Commodores of the Cape Cod Baseball League. In 2014, his junior year at West Virginia, he went 6–2 with a 3.13 ERA in 12 starts.

The Orioles selected Means in the 11th round, with the 331st overall selection, of the 2014 MLB draft. He pitched for the Delmarva Shorebirds of the Single–A South Atlantic League in 2015. He threw a no-hitter for Delmarva in July. He pitched for the Frederick Keys of the High–A Carolina League in 2016, before receiving a midseason promotion to the Bowie Baysox of the Double–A Eastern League. He returned to Bowie in 2017. In 2018, he was promoted to the Norfolk Tides of the Triple–A International League.

=== Baltimore Orioles ===
The Orioles promoted Means to the major leagues on September 24, 2018. After a competition in spring training, the Orioles named Means to the team's Opening Day roster as a relief pitcher for the 2019 season. After three appearances out of the bullpen, pitching to a 1.59 ERA in 5 2/3 innings, Means was moved into the Orioles' starting rotation.

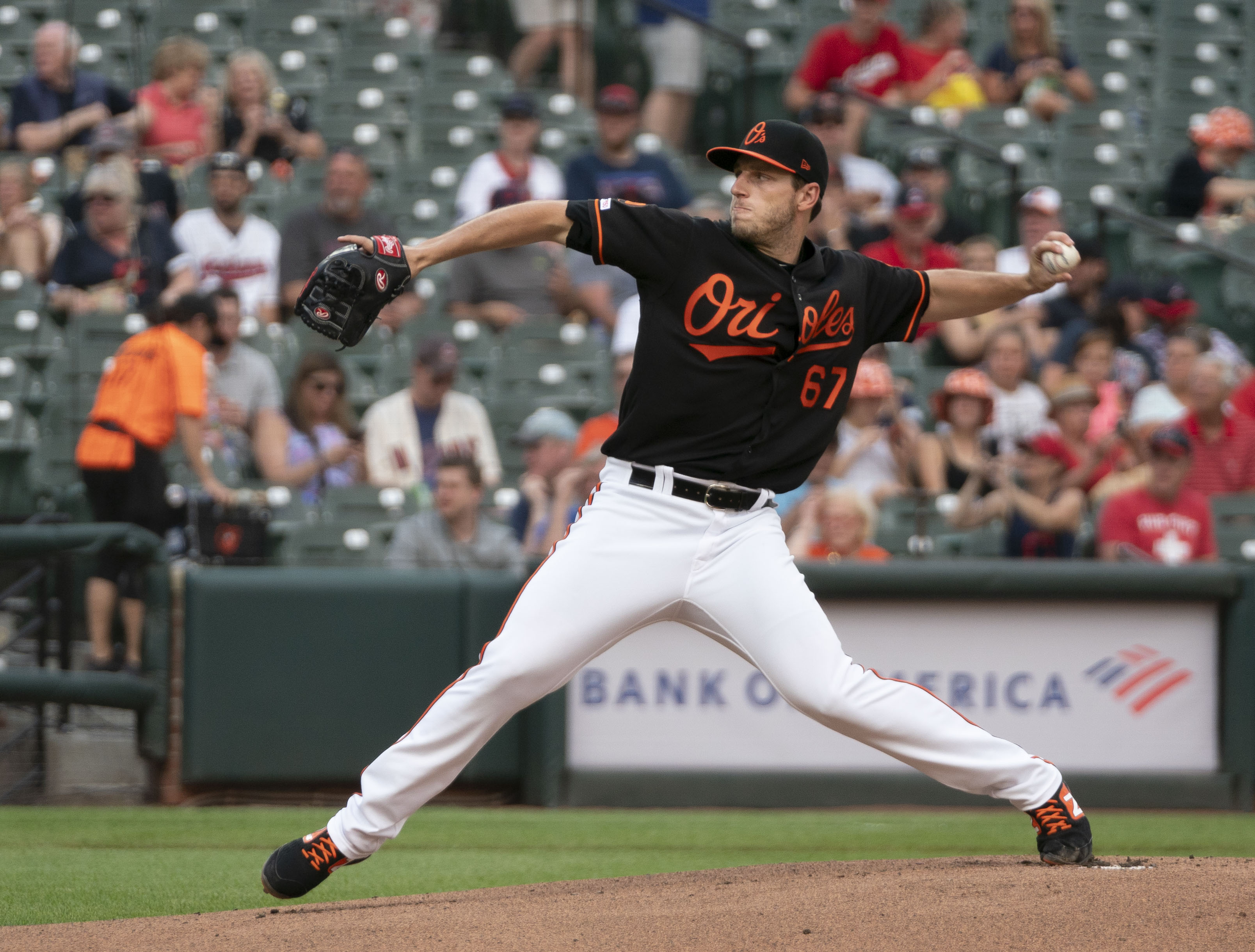
Means pitching for the Orioles in 2019

On June 28, 2019, Means was selected to his first All-Star Game, his 2.50 ERA ranking second among American League pitchers for the first half of the season. Starting in 27 of 31 pitching appearances, he completed his rookie campaign at 12–11 with a 3.60 ERA. He finished second in American League Rookie of the Year voting. In the 2020 season, which was shortened by the COVID-19 pandemic, Means pitched to a 4.53 ERA, 42 strikeouts and a 2–4 record over 43 2/3 innings pitched in 10 games pitched, all starts.

The Orioles selected Means as their Opening Day starting pitcher for the 2021 season. On May 5, 2021, he threw a no-hitter against the Seattle Mariners, striking out 12 batters while facing the minimum of 27 batters. His only baserunner, Sam Haggerty, reached on a dropped third strike in the third inning and was subsequently caught trying to steal second base. It was the first no-hitter for the Orioles since 1991 and the first solo no-hitter since Jim Palmer no-hit the Oakland Athletics on August 13, 1969. It was also the first no-hitter in MLB history where the only baserunner reached base on an uncaught third strike. On May 10, Means was named the AL Player of the Week for week of May 3 to May 9. On June 6, Means went onto the 10-day injured list with a strained shoulder. Means was activated on July 20, after missing over a month of action.

Means was named the Opening Day starter for the 2022 season, and pitched on April 7 against the Tampa Bay Rays. On April 13, Means pitched four innings against the Milwaukee Brewers before his removal from the game. He was diagnosed with elbow strain two days later and placed on the 10-day injured list. Means was transferred to the 60-day IL on April 17. Doctors determined that Means needed Tommy John surgery, which prematurely ended his 2022 season. He underwent surgery on May 11, 2022. On May 21, Means agreed to a two-year, $5.925 million contract with the Orioles to avoid arbitration.

Means spent the majority of the 2023 season rehabilitating from surgery. The Orioles activated him from the injured list on September 12, 2023, and he pitched the first five innings in a 5–2 home loss to the St. Louis Cardinals later that same night. Means earned his first win in two years two starts later in a 2–1 road victory over the Cleveland Guardians on September 23 in which he pitched 7 1/3 innings including the first 6 2/3 without allowing a hit.

After missing a short time in 2024 due to injury, Means returned to make four starts and compile a 2.61 ERA with 16 strikeouts across 20 2/3 innings pitched. On May 31, 2024, it was announced that Means would be undergoing season-ending surgery to repair damage to his ulnar collateral ligament. On June 3, Means underwent Tommy John surgery for the second time, effectively ending his season.

=== Cleveland Guardians ===
On February 19, 2025, Means signed a one-year contract with the Cleveland Guardians that included a 2026 club option. He did not appear in the major leagues for Cleveland, making seven rehabilitation appearances for the High-A Lake County Captains and Triple-A Columbus Clippers. On November 6, the Guardians declined their club option on Means, making him a free agent.

On December 18, 2025, Means announced that he was closing in on a contract with an unnamed team when he suffered an Achilles tendon rupture, effectively ending his season.

=== Kansas City Royals ===
On February 13, 2026, Means signed a two-year minor league contract with the Kansas City Royals. In 5 starts between Triple-A and High-A he threw 14.1 innings going 0-1 with a 3.77 ERA and 11 strikeouts.

== Personal life ==
Means' father Alan worked with the International Brotherhood of Teamsters for more than 30 years. Alan was the Local 41 (Kansas City, Missouri) Secretary/Treasurer just before his death from pancreatic cancer at age 57 on August 5, 2020. His younger brother Jake played college baseball at Indiana State University before being selected by the Kansas City Royals in the 22nd round (475th overall) of the 2019 Major League Baseball draft.

Means is married to former professional soccer player Caroline Stanley. They had their first child, a son, in 2020.

== See also ==
- List of Major League Baseball no-hitters

Awards and achievements
Preceded by Carlos Rodón	No-hitter pitcher May 5, 2021	Succeeded by Wade Miley
