= Carlos Rodón =

American baseball player (born 1992)

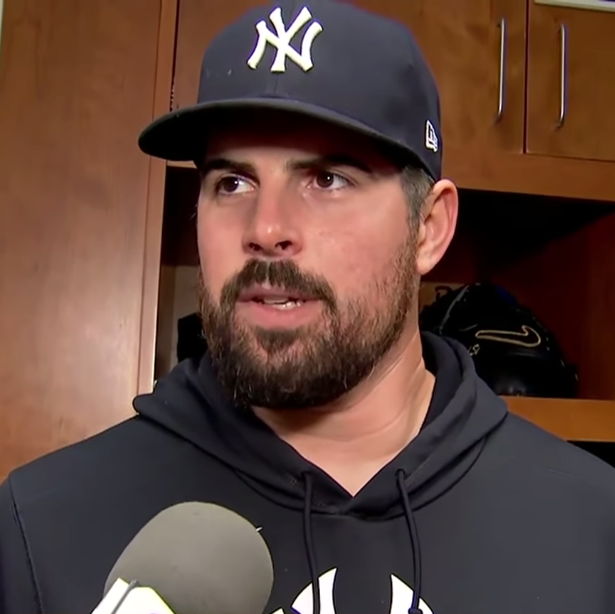
- Rodón with the New York Yankees in 2025

New York Yankees – No. 55
- Pitcher
- Born: December 10, 1992 (age 33); Miami, Florida, U.S.
- Bats: Left Throws: Left

MLB debut
- April 21, 2015, for the Chicago White Sox

MLB statistics (through 2026 season)
- Win–loss record: 100–75
- Earned run average: 3.67
- Strikeouts: 1,500
- Stats at Baseball Reference

Teams
- Chicago White Sox (2015–2021); San Francisco Giants (2022); New York Yankees (2023–present)

Career highlights and awards
- 3× All-Star (2021, 2022, 2025); Pitched a no-hitter on April 14, 2021
Medals
Men's baseball
Representing the United States
Haarlem Baseball Week
Bronze medal – third place	2012	Team

Carlos Antonio Rodón (born December 10, 1992) is an American professional baseball pitcher for the New York Yankees of Major League Baseball (MLB). He has previously played in MLB for the Chicago White Sox and San Francisco Giants. Rodón is a three-time MLB All-Star.

Rodón played college baseball at North Carolina State, and was drafted by the White Sox in the first round, with the third overall pick, of the 2014 MLB draft. He made his MLB debut with the White Sox in 2015. On April 14, 2021, Rodón pitched the 20th no-hitter in White Sox history, against the Cleveland Indians. He entered free agency after the 2021 season, and signed with the Giants. Opting out of his contract with San Francisco after one season, Rodón signed a six-year contract with the Yankees after the 2022 season.

== Early life ==
Rodón was born in Miami, Florida. His father immigrated from Cuba in 1967, when he was five years old, and his mother is a Cuban-American. The family moved to Holly Springs, North Carolina, when he was a child.

Rodón attended Holly Springs High School, and played for the school's baseball team. During his junior year in 2010, he threw a no-hitter, two one-hitters, and four shutouts. He had a 10–1 win–loss record with a 0.80 earned run average (ERA) and 115 strikeouts and was named all-state by the North Carolina Baseball Coaches Association. In 2011, he went 11–0 with a 1.40 ERA and 135 strikeouts, leading Holly Springs to the North Carolina 4A state championship over national powerhouse T. C. Roberson High School.

The Milwaukee Brewers selected Rodón in the 16th round of the 2011 Major League Baseball draft. However, he decided not to sign and to attend North Carolina State University.

== College career ==
As a freshman for the NC State Wolfpack, in 2012, Rodón went 9–0 with a 1.57 ERA, while setting the NC State freshman record with 135 strikeouts (2nd for the season in the Atlantic Coast Conference (ACC) to Duke's Marcus Stroman's (136), with 43 walks in 117 innings pitched. He was the National Collegiate Baseball Writers Association Freshman Pitcher of the Year and an All-American. He was the first-ever freshman to be named the Atlantic Coast Conference's pitcher of the year, and he was named freshman of the year after leading the NC State Wolfpack to a super regional. In addition, he was a finalist for the Golden Spikes Award and was named the Louisville Slugger's National Freshman Pitcher of the Year. He led the ACC in ERA (1.57), innings pitched (114 2/3), complete games (2), and opponent's batting average (.176), finishing second in the conference and third nationally in strikeouts.

In the 2013 season, Rodón led NC State to their first College World Series since 1968. In his sophomore season, Rodón went 10–3 with a 2.99 ERA in 19 starts. He had 184 strikeouts, leading NCAA Division I; the prior four pitchers to lead the Division with that many strikeouts, three of whom were future major league Cy Young Award winners, were Tim Lincecum, David Price, Stephen Strasburg, and Trevor Bauer. He also gave up 45 walks and led the ACC with 16 hit batsmen, and his 12.54 strikeouts per 9 innings led NCAA Division I. He threw three complete games in 132 1/3 innings pitched. Rodón's sophomore performance set the NC State single-season record with 184 strikeouts. He was also named ACC Pitcher of the Week back-to-back after recording career-highs of 14 and 16 strikeouts against Florida Atlantic University and La Salle University. He won the USA Baseball Richard W. "Dick" Case Player of the Year Award in 2013.

As a junior, Rodón was 6–7 with a 2.01 ERA, and 117 strikeouts in 98 2/3 innings, with an ACC-leading 15 hit batsmen. He broke the NC State school record for career strikeouts, which had previously been 386, during an April 11, 2014, game against the Duke Blue Devils. He finished his career with 436 strikeouts.

== International career ==
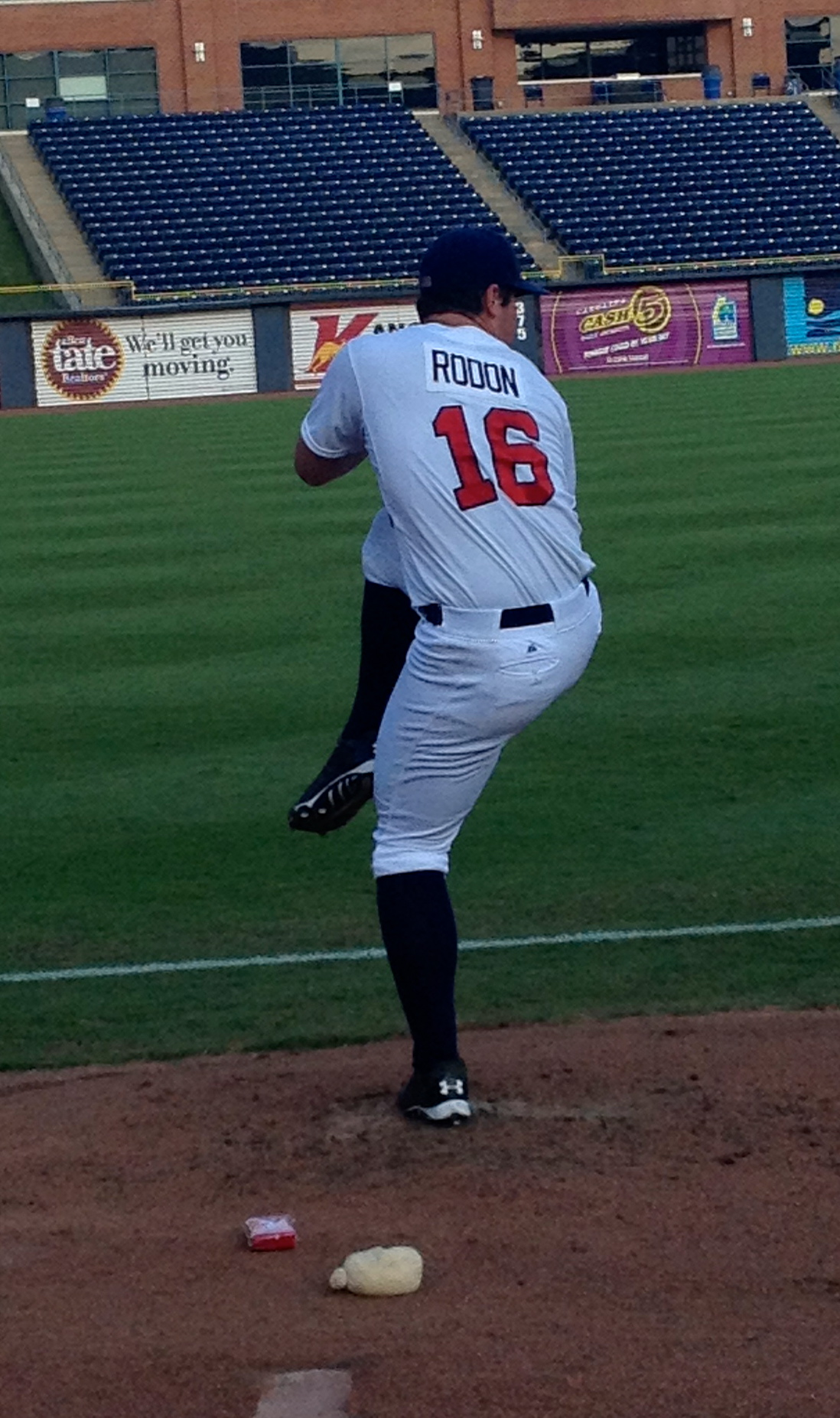
Rodón with Team USA

After his freshman year, Rodón earned a spot on USA Baseball's Collegiate National Team. Originally, he almost turned down the offer because his coach at North Carolina State University, Elliott Avent, wanted to shut him down for the summer. However, Rodón joined the team because he would have had the opportunity to play in Cuba, where his family is from. After his sophomore year, Team USA listed him as a top prospect, and Rodón spent the summer of 2013 playing for Team USA. In two seasons on Team USA, Rodón was 5–0, allowed only three earned runs over 36 innings (0.75 ERA), and contributed 42 strikeouts.

== Professional career ==
=== Draft and minor leagues ===
The Chicago White Sox selected Rodón in the first round, third overall, in the 2014 Major League Baseball draft. He signed with the White Sox on July 11, for a signing bonus of $6.582 million.

He made his professional debut on July 22 with the Arizona League White Sox, for whom he pitched three innings. After he pitched 9.2 innings for the Winston-Salem Dash of the Class A-Advanced Carolina League, the White Sox promoted Rodón to the Charlotte Knights of the Class AAA International League, where he debuted on August 19 and for whom he pitched 12 innings. With the three minor league teams in 2014, he was 0-0 with a 3.28 ERA in 24.2 innings in which he struck out 38 batters, averaging 13.9 strikeouts per 9 innings.

=== Chicago White Sox (2015–2021) ===
On April 20, 2015, Rodón was called up to the White Sox' major league roster. The initial plan was for Rodón to pitch out of the bullpen, the way Chris Sale began his major league career with the White Sox. Rodón made his Major League debut on April 21. He pitched 2.1 innings, giving up two runs, walking three batters, and striking out Lonnie Chisenhall. He recorded his first start, and his first win, in the second game of a May 9 doubleheader against the Cincinnati Reds at US Cellular Field, giving up two earned runs in six innings on four hits, four walks, and eight strikeouts. In 26 games (23 starts), Rodón finished 9–6 with a 3.75 ERA.

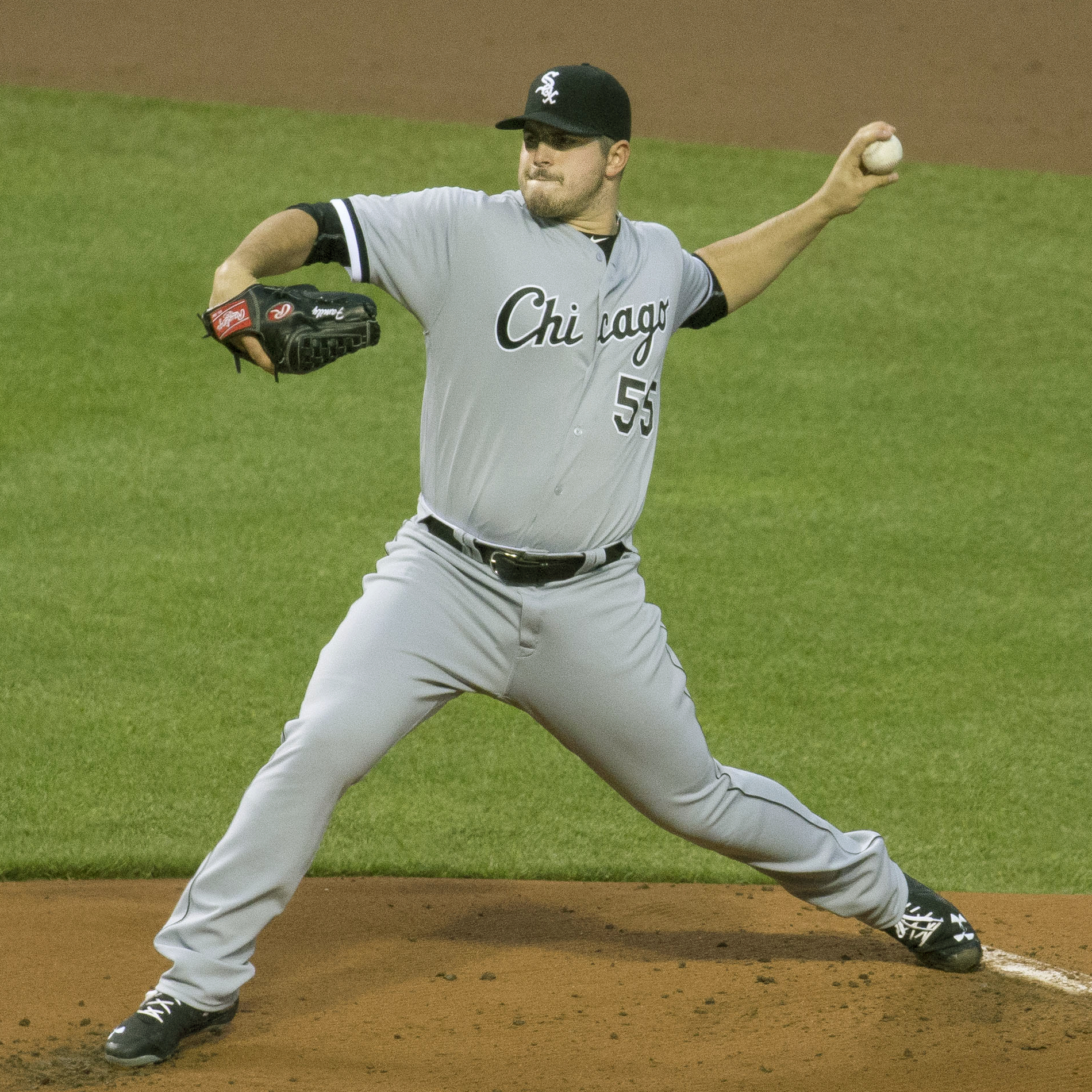
Rodón in 2016 with the White Sox

On July 9, 2016, Rodón was placed on the 15-day disabled list due to a left wrist sprain. In 28 starts, Rodón finished 9–10 with an ERA of 4.04 in 165 innings, and his 9.164 strikeouts per 9 innings were 7th in the AL.

During the 2017 season, Rodón spent significant time on the disabled list, and was only able to start 12 games. He finished with a 2-5 record in 69 1/3 innings. He began the 2018 season on the 60-day disabled list with a shoulder injury. He was activated off the disabled list on June 9. He ended the season with a record of 6–8 in 20 starts.

On March 18, 2019, the team announced that Rodón would be the Opening Day starter. On May 15, Rodón underwent Tommy John surgery; he missed the rest of the season recovering from the procedure. In 2019, Rodón had a 3–2 record in seven starts with 46 strikeouts in 34 2/3 innings.

With the 2020 Chicago White Sox, Rodón appeared in 4 games, compiling an 0–2 record with 8.22 ERA and 6 strikeouts in 7 2/3 innings pitched. On December 2, Rodón was non-tendered by the White Sox.

On January 30, 2021, Rodón re-signed with the White Sox on a one-year, $3 million contract. On April 14, 2021, Rodón no-hit the Cleveland Indians 8-0 at Guaranteed Rate Field. After retiring the first 25 batters, he lost his bid for a perfect game on a hit by pitch to Roberto Pérez. Rodón, who recorded seven strikeouts and threw 75 of 114 pitches for strikes, then retired the next two batters. Rodón was originally scheduled to start the first-ever MLB at Field of Dreams, but he was not able to start due to left shoulder fatigue. Instead, Lance Lynn replaced Rodón to start for that game. In 2021, Rodón got his first All-Star nod. Rodón finished the regular season with a 13–5 record with an ERA of 2.37 in 24 starts while pitching in 132 2/3 innings and striking out 185 batters (9th in the AL), for 12.6 strikeouts per 9 innings. His .722 won-loss percentage was 2nd in the league, and his 13 wins were fifth in the AL. Rodón made his first career postseason start in Game 4 of the 2021 American League Division Series against the Houston Astros. After pitching a scoreless first inning, he struggled by giving up two runs in his next 1 2/3 innings as the White Sox lost 10–1 and were eliminated. He came in fifth in the voting for the AL Cy Young Award.

=== San Francisco Giants (2022) ===
On March 14, 2022, Rodón signed a two-year, $44 million contract with the San Francisco Giants, containing an opt-out clause after the first season. On April 9 at Oracle Park, Rodón struck out 12 Miami Marlins' batters in five innings. His 12 strikeouts tied Juan Marichal's team record in the San Francisco Era for the most strikeouts in a Giants debut. On April 15 at Progressive Field, in a 4–1 win over the Cleveland Guardians, Rodón won his first start as a Giant by striking out nine batters over seven innings while allowing only two hits. His 21 strikeouts broke Marichal's team record in the San Francisco Era for the most by a Giants pitcher in two appearances to start a season. On April 20 at Citi Field, in a 5–2 win over the New York Mets, Rodón struck out eight batters in five innings. His 29 strikeouts broke Cliff Melton's franchise record for the most strikeouts through the first three games of a season. From April 9 to 26, Rodón struck out 38 total batters, which spanned the whole month of April and is the most by a Giants pitcher in his first four appearances of a season since 1901. On July 12, 2022, Rodón was named as the MLB All-Star Game roster replacement for Josh Hader.

On September 9, 2022, at Wrigley Field, Rodón struck out 11 Chicago Cubs batters, reaching double-digits in strikeouts for the 10th time that season. This set a new Giants all-time single season franchise record, previously held by Tim Lincecum and Jason Schmidt.

Rodón came in sixth place in NL Cy Young Award voting. On November 6, 2022, Rodón opted out of the second year of his contract and became a free agent.

=== New York Yankees (2023–present) ===
Rodón (wearing the NYPD cap) with the Yankees in 2025

On December 21, 2022, Rodón signed a six-year, $162 million contract with the New York Yankees. He began the 2023 season on the injured list due to a muscle strain in his left forearm. His recuperation was delayed by a back injury. On July 7, 2023, he was activated from the injured list to make his Yankees debut. On September 29, in his final start of the season, Rodón allowed eight runs without recording an out. His season concluded with a 3-8 record and a 6.85 ERA in 14 games started.

In 2024, Rodón posted a 16–9 record in 32 starts and a 3.96 ERA with 195 strikeouts in 175 innings.

On March 27, 2025, Rodón was the Opening Day starting pitcher for the 2025 Yankees. On that day, he got his first win of the season against Milwaukee Brewers, pitched 5 1/3 innings, giving up four hits, allowing one earned run, walking two batters, and striking out seven batters in a 4–2 win. On July 11, 2025, Rodón was named as the MLB All-Star Game roster replacement for Max Fried.

In 2025, Rodón posted an 18–9 record in 33 starts and a 3.09 ERA with 203 strikeouts in 195 1/3 innings. On October 16, following the Yankees' elimination in the postseason, Rodón underwent surgery to remove a bone spur in his left elbow. He began the 2026 season on the injured list to continue his recovery. On April 22, Rodón was optioned to the High Class-A Hudson Valley Renegades for a rehab assignment. On July 3, 2026, Rodón was placed on the 15-day injured list due to left elbow inflammation.

== Personal life ==
Rodón and his wife, Ashley, married in January 2018 in Costa Rica. They have a daughter and two sons together.

Awards and achievements
Preceded by Joe Musgrove	No-hitter pitcher April 14, 2021	Succeeded by John Means
