= Mark Buehrle =

American baseball player (born 1979)

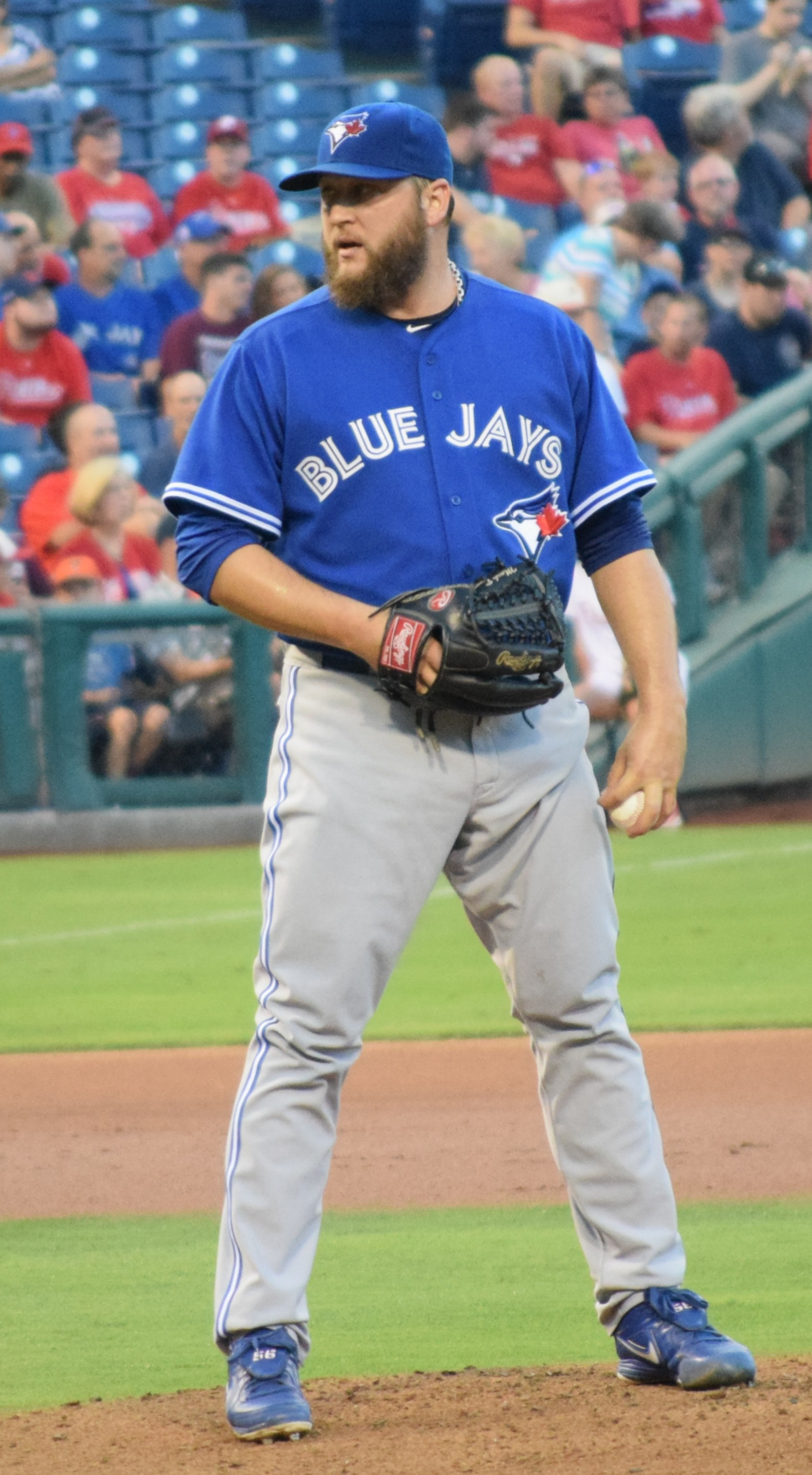
- Buehrle with the Toronto Blue Jays in 2015
- Pitcher
- Born: March 23, 1979 (age 47); St. Charles, Missouri, U.S.
- Batted: Left Threw: Left

MLB debut
- July 16, 2000, for the Chicago White Sox

Last MLB appearance
- October 4, 2015, for the Toronto Blue Jays

MLB statistics
- Win–loss record: 214–160
- Earned run average: 3.81
- Strikeouts: 1,870
- Stats at Baseball Reference

Teams
- Chicago White Sox (2000–2011); Miami Marlins (2012); Toronto Blue Jays (2013–2015)

Career highlights and awards
- 5× All-Star (2002, 2005, 2006, 2009, 2014); World Series champion (2005); 4× Gold Glove Award (2009–2012); Pitched a perfect game on July 23, 2009; Pitched a no-hitter on April 18, 2007; Chicago White Sox No. 56 retired

Mark Alan Buehrle (/ˈbɜːrli/; born March 23, 1979) is an American former professional baseball pitcher. He played the majority of his Major League Baseball (MLB) career with the Chicago White Sox, playing twelve seasons for the team and winning the World Series with them in 2005. Buehrle also pitched for the Miami Marlins and Toronto Blue Jays.

Buehrle pitched a no-hitter against the Texas Rangers on April 18, 2007, surrendering just one walk to Sammy Sosa who was then picked off at first base. Two seasons later, Buehrle pitched the 18th perfect game in baseball history, against the Tampa Bay Rays on July 23, 2009.

In White Sox pitching history, Buehrle is fifth all-time in strikeouts, sixth in games started, and eighth in wins and innings pitched. In the entirety of his career, he was 2nd in wins for all pitchers who played from 2000 to 2015.

== High school, college and the minor leagues ==
Buehrle was born in St. Charles, Missouri, and attended Francis Howell North High School in St. Charles. In his sophomore year, Buehrle was cut from the school's baseball team.

After high school, Buehrle attended Jefferson College in Hillsboro, Missouri. He was later selected in the 38th round of the 1998 draft by the Chicago White Sox organization.

Buehrle began his professional career in 1999 with the White Sox' Single-A Burlington Bees. He went 7–4 with three saves and a 4.10 ERA in 20 games (14 starts), including a complete-game shutout. Buehrle followed this up with an excellent year in 2000, going 8–4 with a 2.28 ERA in 16 starts for the Double-A affiliate Birmingham Barons in Hoover, Alabama, giving up only 17 walks in 119 innings. He would be named the Southern League's Most Outstanding Pitcher that season and was the winning pitcher in the Futures Game, then rated as the No. 8 prospect in the White Sox organization.

Buehrle made a total of 36 appearances in the minor leagues before joining the White Sox roster.

== Major League career ==
=== Chicago White Sox (2000-2011) ===
==== 2000–2004 ====
Buehrle made his major league debut on July 16, 2000, pitching one inning of relief against the Milwaukee Brewers and allowing a run. Three days later he started against Minnesota, allowing six hits and two runs in seven innings while earning a win.

In 2001, Buehrle's first year as a major league starter, he went 16–8 with a 3.29 ERA in 32 starts. He threw 24 2/3 consecutive scoreless innings from May 26 to June 7, the most by a White Sox pitcher since Tommy John threw 25 scoreless innings in 1967. Buehrle recorded his first complete game on May 26 against the Detroit Tigers and later pitched two consecutive complete games on August 3 against the Tampa Bay Devil Rays (a one-hitter) and on August 8 against the Anaheim Angels.

In 2002, Buehrle posted a 19–12 record in 34 starts and ranked among the American League leaders in innings pitched (second, 239), games started (tied for second, 34), complete games (tied for second, 5), shutouts (tied for second, 2), wins (tied for fourth, 19) and quality starts (tied for fifth, 23). Buehrle pitched at least six innings 30 times and at least eight innings nine times. FOX Sports Net Chicago honored him as the White Sox Player of the Year. He was selected as a member of the Major League All-Star Team that played in Japan in November. In his one start, he allowed four runs on five hits over three innings, before leaving with a bruised left shoulder sustained when he was hit with a line drive off the bat of Hideki Matsui.

Buehrle set a career high with 35 starts in 2003, posting a 14–14 record with a 4.14 ERA. He ranked among the American League leaders in starts (tied second), quality starts (third, 24) and innings pitched (fifth).

In 2004, Buehrle led the American League in innings pitched with 245 1/3, in games started with 35, and in complete games with five. He ranked among the AL leaders in quality starts (third, 23), walks per nine innings (fifth, 1.87), wins (tied sixth, 16), strikeout to-walk ratio (seventh, 3.24), ERA (eighth, 3.89) and strikeouts (ninth, 165). Buehrle lasted at least six innings in each of his last 28 starts. On July 21 in Cleveland, he faced the minimum 27 batters in a two-hit shutout of the Indians.

==== 2005–2008 ====
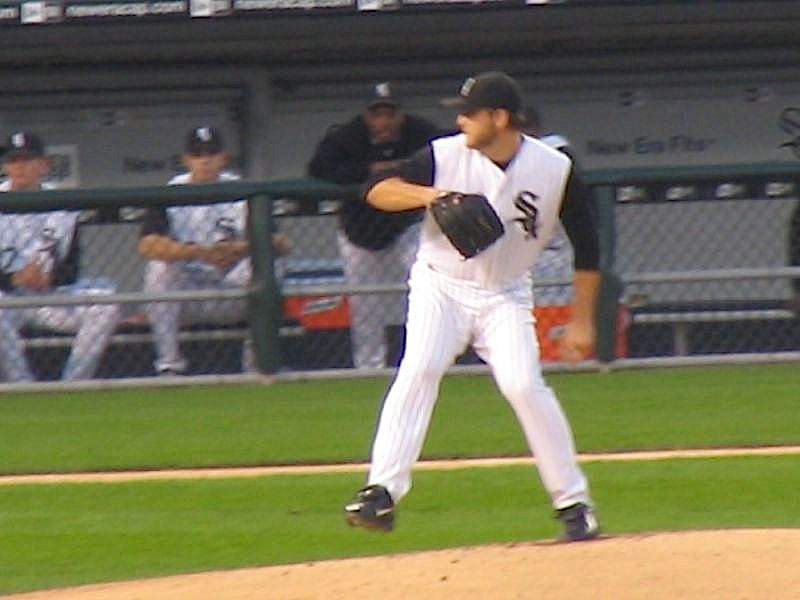
Buehrle pitching for the Chicago White Sox in 2005.

In 2005, Buehrle began the season with a 10–3 record, a 2.58 ERA and a 1.11 WHIP. On April 16, he finished a game against the Seattle Mariners in only 1 hour and 39 minutes, giving up only one run and three hits (all to Ichiro Suzuki), and backed by only two White Sox runs, both homers by Paul Konerko. In the game, he threw just 106 pitches. Subtracting the time spent between innings, the game took only 63 1/2 minutes to play. Buehrle was selected to the American League All-Star Team, and was named the starting pitcher after Roy Halladay could not to play due to a broken leg. He pitched two innings, allowing no runs and striking out three batters while earning a win. Buehrle's streak of 49 consecutive starts of six or more innings ended on August 1, 2005, after he was ejected for hitting Baltimore Orioles outfielder B. J. Surhoff. During the White Sox playoff run, Buehrle pitched a complete game against the Los Angeles Angels of Anaheim in Game 2 of the ALCS, the first of four consecutive complete games for White Sox starters. On October 25, 2005, Buehrle became the first pitcher in World Series history to start and save consecutive games, earning a no-decision in Game 2 and his first career save in Game 3 of the 2005 World Series, which the Sox swept from the Houston Astros, winning their first world championship since 1917.

On May 14, 2006, Buehrle became the first major-league starting pitcher in over a century to allow seven runs in the first inning but then win the game. The previous time had been on September 29, 1900, when Jack Powell of the St. Louis Cardinals pitched such a game against the Chicago Cubs. On October 30, 2006, the White Sox exercised their $9.5 million option for Buehrle's 2007 season. Buehrle finished the 2006 season 12–13 with a 4.99 ERA in 32 starts, his first losing season in seven major league seasons.

On April 18, 2007, Buehrle threw a no-hitter versus the Texas Rangers at U.S. Cellular Field. It was the first no-hitter in the stadium's history. It was the sixteenth such game in team history and the first since Wilson Álvarez no-hit the Baltimore Orioles on August 11, 1991. A walk to Sammy Sosa in the fifth inning cost him a perfect game, although he still faced the minimum number of batters, 27, by picking him off at first base two pitches later. Buehrle struck out eight Rangers during the game, throwing an efficient 106 pitches. Thanks to Buehrle's gem, the American League narrowly avoided, by mere days, five years without a no-hitter.

On July 8, 2007, Buehrle signed a four-year contract extension worth a reported $56 million with a player option worth $19 million if he was traded.

Buehrle finished the 2008 season with a 15–12 record and 3.79 ERA in 34 starts, pitching at least 200 innings for the eighth straight season. He induced more double plays (34) and gave up more infield hits (38) than any other pitcher in the majors, while tying for the major league lead in bunt hits allowed (9).

==== 2009–2011 ====
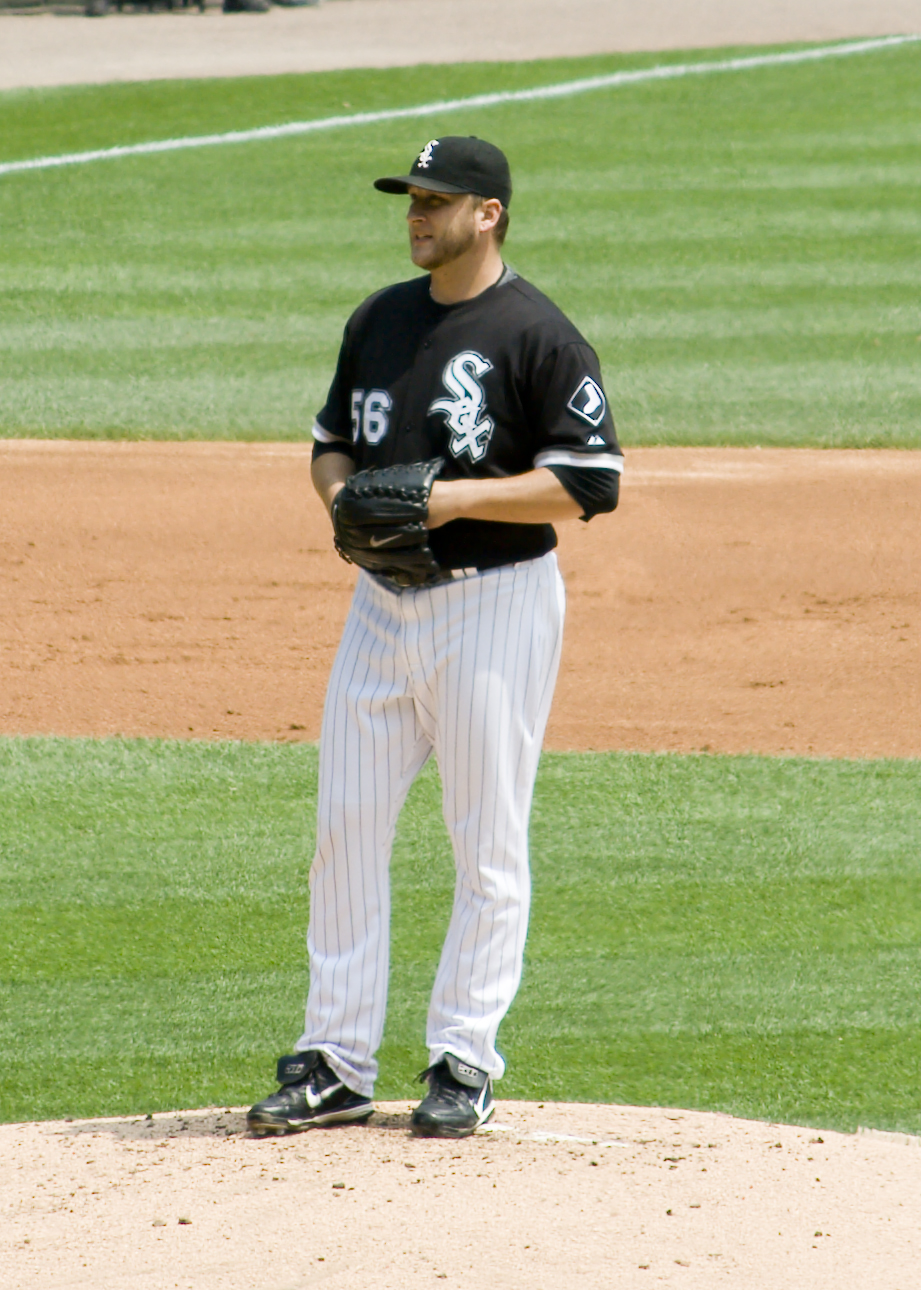
Buehrle receiving a sign during his 2009 perfect game

On June 14, 2009, Buehrle hit his first major league home run, off Milwaukee Brewers starting pitcher Braden Looper, becoming the first White Sox pitcher to hit a home run in a game since Jon Garland on June 18, 2006, at Cincinnati. On July 5, 2009, Buehrle was selected to represent Chicago at the 2009 All-Star Game, where he pitched a perfect third inning.

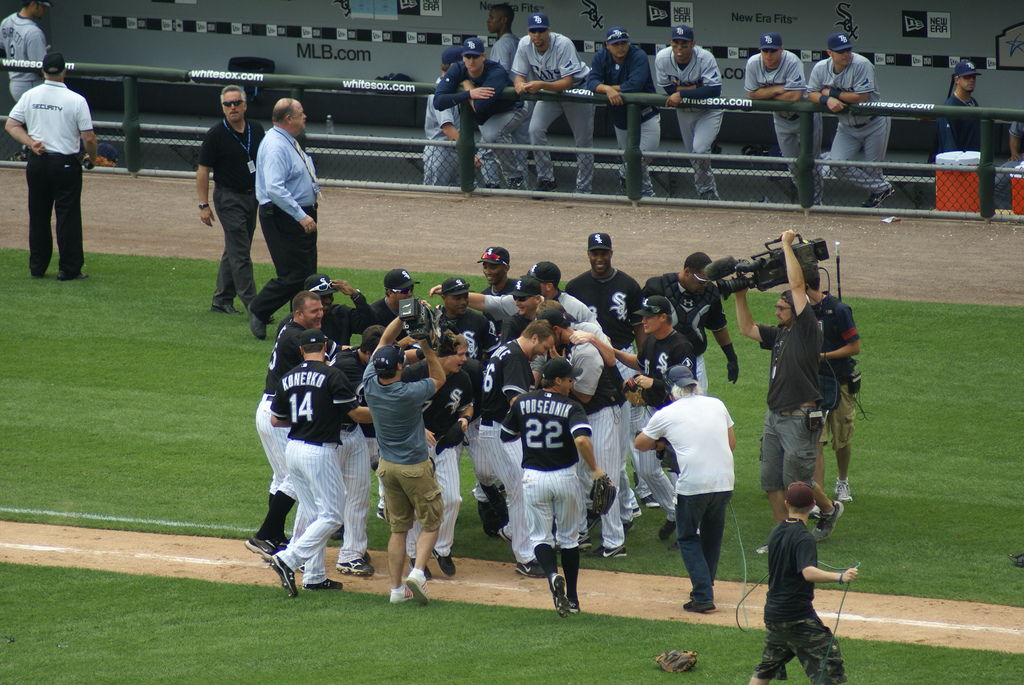
Teammates celebrate Buehrle's perfect game on July 23, 2009

On July 23, 2009, Buehrle threw a perfect game against the Tampa Bay Rays at U.S. Cellular Field. It was the eighteenth perfect game in MLB history and Buehrle's second career no-hitter. With the perfect game, Buehrle became the 24th pitcher to throw multiple no-hitters in a career, and the sixth perfect game pitcher who had also thrown another no-hitter, joining Cy Young, Addie Joss, Jim Bunning, Sandy Koufax, and Randy Johnson. (Roy Halladay would join them by pitching two no-hitters in 2010: a perfect game on May 29, and a second no-hitter on October 6, in the NLDS.) Coincidentally, the home plate umpire for both of Buehrle's no-hitters was Eric Cooper (who, coincidentally, shares Buehrle's number 56). He recorded the final out against Jason Bartlett on a ground ball to shortstop Alexei Ramírez. Earlier in the ninth inning, teammate DeWayne Wise, a defensive replacement, made a spectacular catch to rob Gabe Kapler of a home run and preserve the perfect game. Like his previous no-hitter, the game was completed in exactly two hours, three minutes. On July 28, his next appearance, Buehrle retired the first 17 batters he faced before finally allowing a baserunner in the sixth inning, setting an MLB record for consecutive outs at 45, which was later broken on August 28, 2014, by Yusmeiro Petit. Buehrle became only the third pitcher in MLB history (joining Cy Young and Sandy Koufax) to have a no-hitter, a perfect game, and a World Series title with the same team – a feat Buehrle accomplished with the White Sox in 2005 (World Series), 2007 (no-hitter), and 2009 (perfect game).

Illinois Governor Pat Quinn declared July 30, 2009 "Mark Buehrle Day". Prior to the game against the New York Yankees, Buehrle was given a plaque to commemorate the occasion. In September 2009, the July 23 perfect game received the Sporting News Performance of the Decade award.

In November 2009, Buehrle was selected for his first career Gold Glove Award. He also was honored with a Fielding Bible Award for his statistically based defensive excellence during the year.

On April 5, 2010, Buehrle made his eighth career opening day start, setting a franchise record. In that game he threw 7 1/3 shutout innings against the Cleveland Indians and also made an incredible play which involved him flipping the ball to first base between his legs with his glove. After this play, Web Gems on Baseball Tonight added the "Buehrle-Meter", in which they compare the day's best play to the degree of difficulty of Buehrle's. The "Buehrle-Meter" is used daily on Baseball Tonight and was proposed as an idea by Baseball Tonight's John Kruk. On August 3, 2010, Buehrle won his tenth game of the season against the Detroit Tigers pitching 7 2/3 innings, allowing two earned runs on seven hits and striking out one batter in a 12–2 blowout. The win marked his tenth consecutive season of at least 10 wins.

In November 2010, Buehrle was selected with his second career Gold Glove Award. He is the only pitcher in MLB history to throw multiple no-hitters and win multiple Gold Gloves. He also won his second consecutive Fielding Bible Award. He followed up with his third Fielding Bible and Gold Glove Awards in 2011.

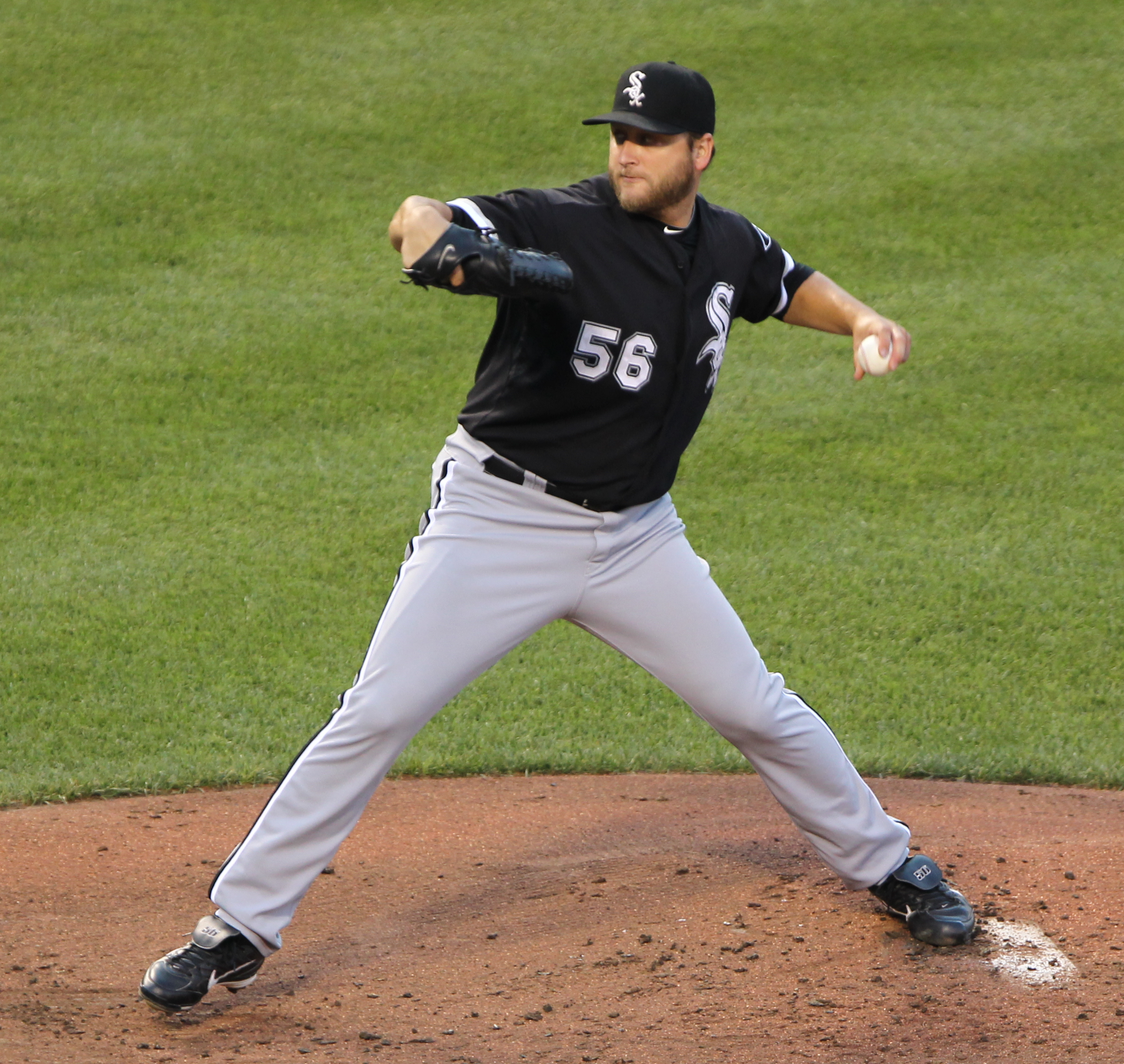
Buehrle pitching for the Chicago White Sox in 2011.

In twelve seasons with the White Sox, Buehrle was 161–119, with a 3.83 ERA, appearing in four All-Star Games.

=== Miami Marlins (2012) ===
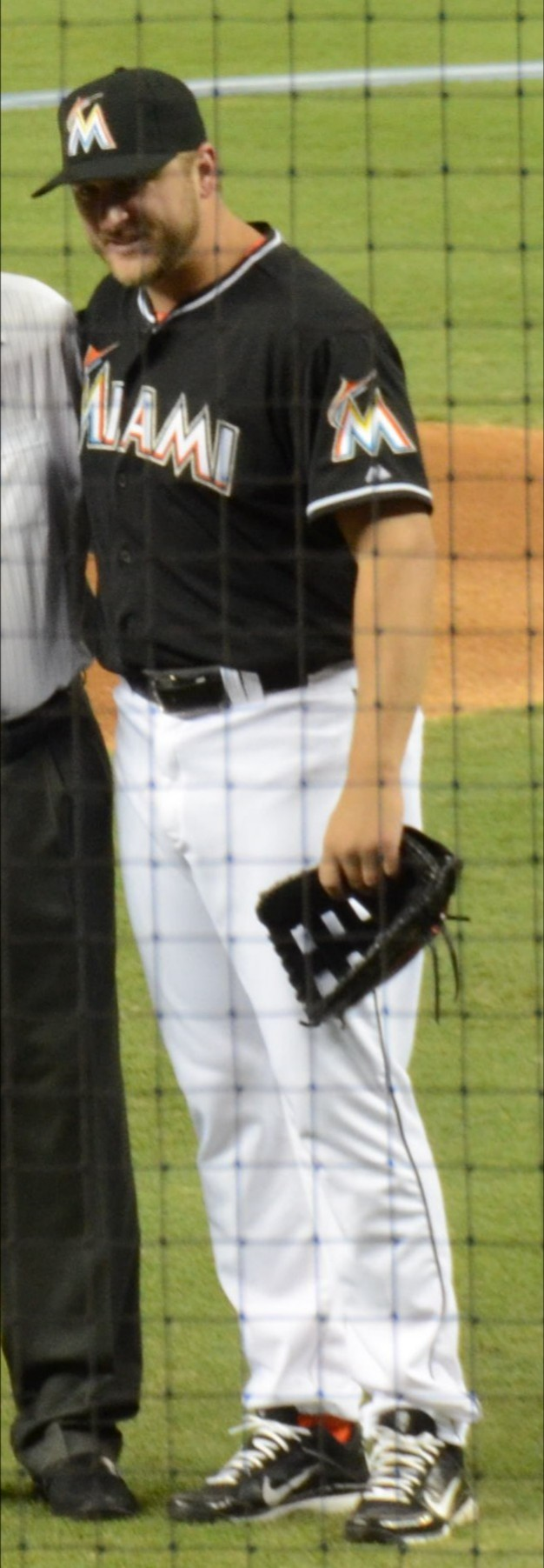
Buehrle with the Miami Marlins in 2012.

On December 7, 2011, Buehrle agreed to a four-year, $58 million contract with the Miami Marlins. In his debut with the Marlins, Buehrle recorded a loss, giving up two earned runs, in six innings pitched against the Cincinnati Reds. On May 5, Buehrle threw a complete game against the San Diego Padres. The Marlins won that game 4–1. Buehrle won his fourth straight Fielding Bible Award in 2012.

In his one season with the Marlins, Buehrle pitched to a 13–13 record with a 3.74 ERA and 125 strikeouts in 31 starts for a team that finished 69–93. It was the first time since 2002 that Buehrle averaged less than one hit allowed per inning.

=== Toronto Blue Jays (2013–2015) ===
On November 19, 2012, Buehrle was traded to the Toronto Blue Jays along with Josh Johnson, José Reyes, John Buck and Emilio Bonifacio, in exchange for Jeff Mathis, Adeiny Hechavarria, Henderson Álvarez, Yunel Escobar, Jake Marisnick, Anthony DeSclafani and Justin Nicolino. On February 5, 2013, manager John Gibbons named Buehrle the number 3 starter for the 2013 season. Buehrle pitched his first complete game and shutout as a Blue Jay on July 25 against the Houston Astros, and surrendered just two hits and two walks while striking out nine. The win broke a season-long seven game losing streak for the Blue Jays.

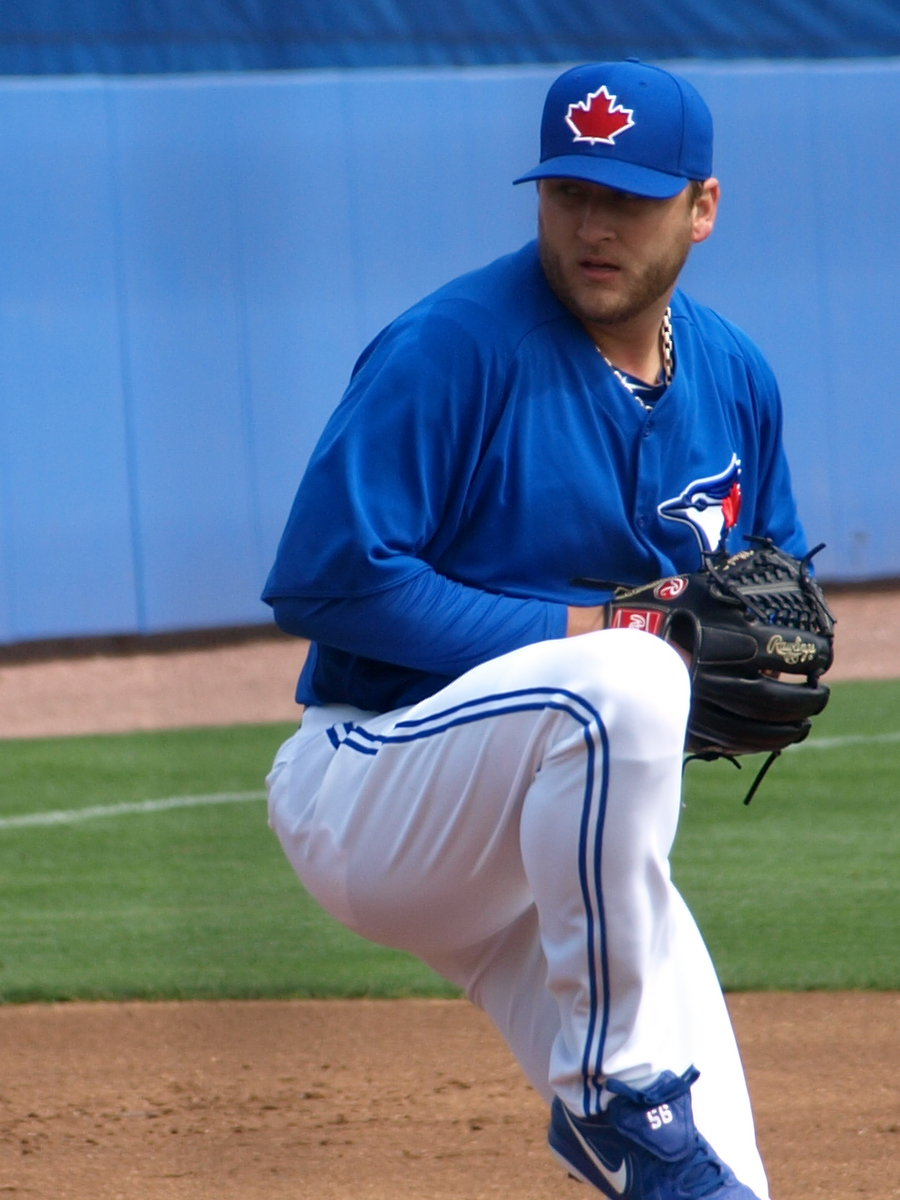
Buehrle during spring training, 2013.

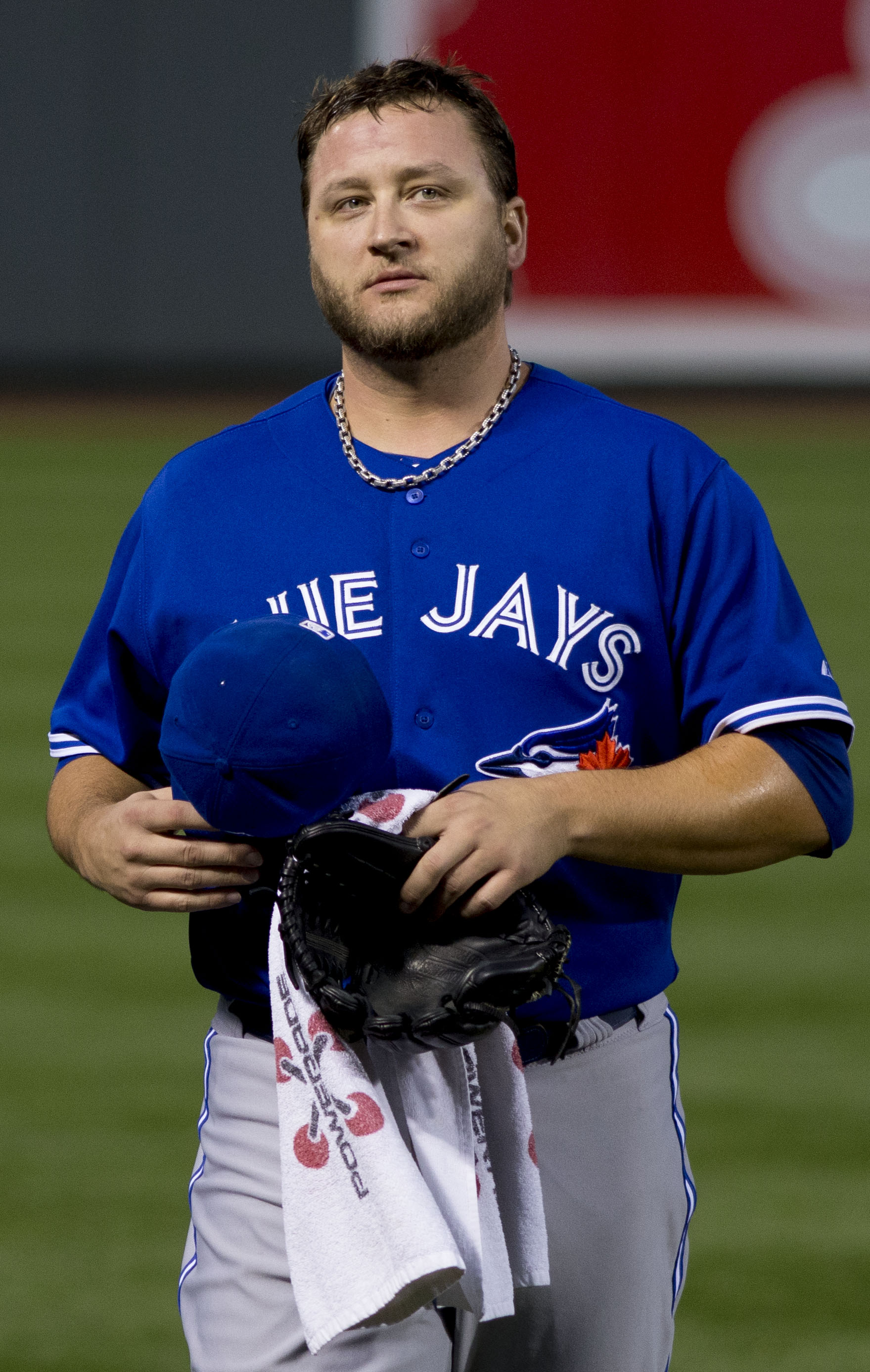
Buehrle with the Toronto Blue Jays in 2013.

On August 25, Buehrle won for the tenth time in 2013, defeating the Houston Astros 2–1. In winning the game, he extended his streak of seasons with at least 10 wins to 13, and also ended a seven-game losing streak for the second time in 2013. Buehrle surpassed 200 innings for the 2013 season in a game against the Boston Red Sox on September 21, his 13th consecutive season with at least 200 innings pitched. He would finish the 2013 season with a record of 12–10, a 4.15 ERA, and 139 strikeouts over 203 2/3 innings pitched in 33 starts. On October 25, Buehrle was announced as a finalist for the AL Pitcher's Gold Glove, along with teammate R. A. Dickey and Detroit Tigers pitcher Doug Fister; however, he would finish second to Dickey in voting.

Buehrle won his first four starts of the 2014 season, and put up an ERA of 0.69. On May 1, he and teammate Melky Cabrera were named the co-winners of the Honda Player of the Month Award for April. In a 10–0 win over the Philadelphia Phillies on May 7, Buehrle earned his sixth win of the season, and became the first pitcher to do so in the 2014 season. In his following start on May 12, Buehrle retained his wins lead, earning his 7th win of the season by beating the Los Angeles Angels of Anaheim 7–3. After taking a no-decision against the Texas Rangers on May 17, Buehrle earned his league-leading eighth win on May 22. He pitched seven innings and yielded only two runs to the Boston Red Sox, and in becoming the majors' first eight-game winner in 2014, gave the Jays a three-game sweep at Fenway Park and a 5–1 road trip. On May 27, Buehrle retained his lead in wins, earning his ninth of the season and extended the Blue Jays winning streak to eight games.

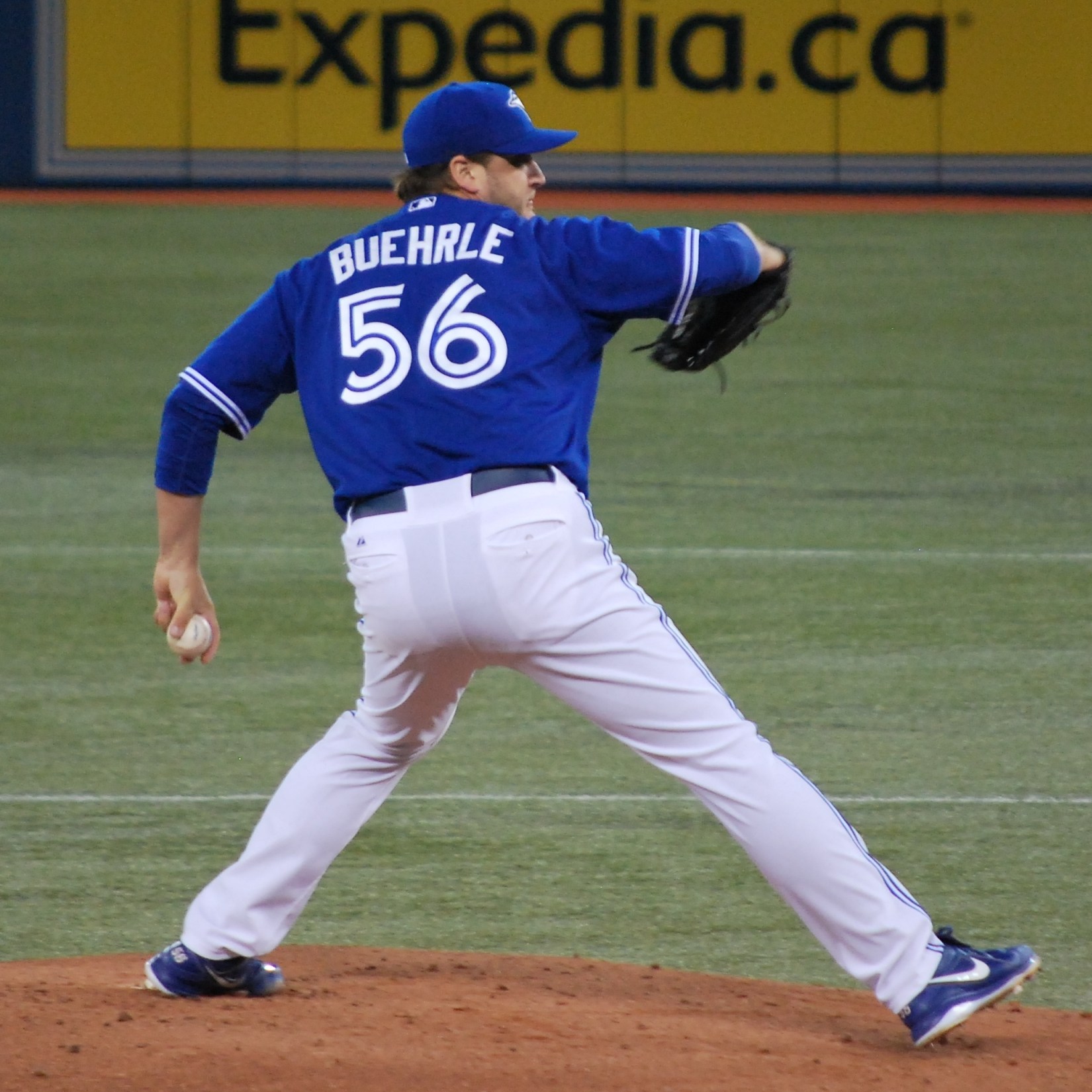
Buehrle pitching for the Toronto Blue Jays in 2013.

On June 1, Buehrle became the first starter to reach double digits in wins, taking his 10th game of the season 4–0 over the Kansas City Royals. His production would drop off considerably from that point onward, posting a record of 2–9 in the 19 starts between June 7 and September 19. On September 24, making his final start of the season, Buehrle surpassed the 200 innings pitched mark for the 14th consecutive season. He would earn the win 1–0 over the Seattle Mariners.

Buehrle began the 2015 season as the fourth starter in the Blue Jays rotation. In his first start of the season, he defeated the Baltimore Orioles 12–5 and earned the 200th win of his career, joining Bartolo Colón, Tim Hudson, and CC Sabathia as the only active pitchers with at least 200 wins. He also became the second pitcher to record his 200th win in a Blue Jays uniform, joining Roger Clemens. On May 29, Buehrle threw his first complete game of the 2015 season, defeating the Minnesota Twins 6–4. In his next start, Buehrle pitched his tenth career complete-game shutout, needing only 93 pitches to defeat the Washington Nationals 8–0. He earned his 30th career win against the Minnesota Twins on August 6, becoming the 21st pitcher to have 30 or more wins against one franchise since 1961. Buehrle made what many believed to be his final appearance of the season on October 2, holding the Tampa Bay Rays to four runs over 6 2/3 innings and earning his 15th win. The start left him two innings short of continuing his streak of 14 seasons with 200 or more innings pitched. On October 3, it was reported that Buehrle would attempt to throw the two innings the following day, and would retire afterward, as he did not believe he would be included on the postseason roster. In the subsequent game, Buehrle was only able to pitch 2/3 of an inning, after errors in the field resulted in Tampa Bay scoring eight unearned runs on five hits. After the game Buehrle, confirmed that he was not named to the Blue Jays' post-season roster, but that he had not yet made a decision about playing the next season.

He finished the 2015 season with a 15–8 record, 3.81 ERA, and 91 strikeouts. He had the fewest strikeouts per 9 innings in the major leagues (4.12), and he also led major league pitchers in highest contact percentage (89.1%) of batters against him. On October 29, Buehrle was announced as a finalist for the pitcher Gold Glove award, along with Sonny Gray and Dallas Keuchel.

In three seasons with Toronto, Buehrle was 40–28 with a 3.79 ERA, appearing in one All-Star Game. Buehrle retired at age 36, having won 10 or more games for 15 consecutive seasons and pitching 200 or more innings in 14 consecutive seasons. He retired with a WAR of 60.0; only Roy Halladay had a higher WAR in the same time period that Buehrle played in.

=== Career statistics ===
W	L	PCT	ERA	G	GS	CG	SHO	SV	IP	H	ER	R	HR	BB	SO	WP	HBP
214	160	.572	3.81	518	493	33	10	0	3283.1	3472	1391	1642	361	724	1870	27	79

Mark Buehrle's number 56 was retired by the Chicago White Sox in 2017.

== Honors ==
Buehrle's number 56 was retired by the Chicago White Sox on June 24, 2017. Buehrle first became eligible for the Hall of Fame in 2021 and received more votes than anyone else making their first appearance on the ballot that year, with 11%. However, he fell to 5.8% in 2022, barely enough to remain on the ballot for another year. In 2023, he rose back up to 10.8%. In 2024, in his 4th ballot, he fell to 8.3%.

== Pitching style ==
Buehrle threw a fastball, curveball, changeup, slider, and cut fastball. He was a command pitcher, relying more on finesse and accuracy than velocity. He was also known for being a contact pitcher, rather than striking out multiple batters. Buehrle often forced line outs, ground outs, and fly outs, with occasional strikeouts. He was considered an efficient pitcher, pitching quickly and keeping his pitch count low. In 2014, Buehrle averaged 15.8 seconds between pitches, 2.1 seconds quicker than the next fastest pitcher.

== Personal life ==
Buehrle and his wife Jamie have two children: a son (born July 26, 2007) and a daughter (born March 3, 2009). They live on a ranch in Missouri. Buehrle grew up following the St. Louis Cardinals. On December 5, 2009, Buehrle attended an Albert Pujols charity fundraiser. He, along with Tony La Russa, bid and won an opportunity to manage the Cardinals for a day at 2010 spring training. Buehrle then gave the prize to Mickey Cunningham, a girl with Down syndrome.

Buehrle's wife Jamie had Orange County Choppers make a surprise motorcycle for him to celebrate his perfect game.

Buehrle and his wife are known animal rights activists, owning four dogs, and have gone on record for criticizing NFL quarterback Michael Vick, who was convicted of running a dog fighting ring. Buehrle generated controversy when he said he had, at points during the 2010 season, hoped the Philadelphia Eagles quarterback would get injured. When he was traded to Toronto, he had to leave his pit bull, Slater, behind with his family due to Ontario's ban on the breed.

== See also ==
- List of Chicago White Sox award winners and league leaders
- List of Chicago White Sox no-hitters
- List of Major League Baseball no-hitters
- List of Major League Baseball perfect games
- List of Major League Baseball career games started leaders
- List of Major League Baseball career wins leaders
- List of Major League Baseball career innings pitched leaders
- List of World Series starting pitchers
- 2021 Baseball Hall of Fame balloting

Awards and achievements
Preceded by Mark Mulder	American League All-Star Game Starting Pitcher; 2005	Succeeded by Kenny Rogers
Preceded by Kevin Brown; Kenny Rogers	American League Pitcher of the Month; May 2004; June 2005	Succeeded by Mark Mulder; Barry Zito
Preceded by Randy Johnson	Perfect game pitcher July 23, 2009	Succeeded by Dallas Braden
Preceded by Aníbal Sánchez; Jonathan Sánchez	No-hitter pitcher April 18, 2007; July 23, 2009	Succeeded by Justin Verlander; Ubaldo Jiménez
Preceded by Jim Barr; Bobby Jenks	Most consecutive batters retired record holder (45); July 28, 2009–August 28, 2014	Succeeded by Yusmeiro Petit
