= Tim Murnane Benefit Game =

Exhibition baseball game

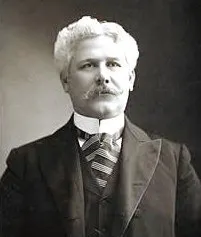
- Murnane in his older years
	1	2	3	4	5	6	7	8	9	R	H	E
All-Stars	0	0	0	0	0	0	0	0	0	0	3	1
Boston Red Sox	0	0	0	0	0	0	0	2	X	2	7	1
- Date: September 27, 1917; 109 years ago
- Venue: Fenway Park
- City: Boston, Massachusetts, U.S.
- Managers: Connie Mack (All-Stars); Jack Barry (Boston Red Sox)
- Umpires: Tom Connolly and Dick Nallin
- Attendance: 17,119
- Time of game: 1:45

The Tim Murnane Benefit Game was an exhibition baseball game played at Fenway Park in Boston, Massachusetts, on September 27, 1917, between the Boston Red Sox of the American League and an all-star team mainly composed of players from the league's other teams. The game was organized as a benefit for the family of Tim Murnane, an early major-league player who went on to have a long career as a sportswriter for The Boston Globe. Murnane had died in February 1917 at age 66. (Note: Murnane's age at time of death is often given as 65 based on a birth date of June 4, 1851; he is now believed to have been born one year earlier, making him 66 at the time of his death.) The Red Sox defeated the all-stars, 2–0, and the game raised from $13,000 ($326,688 in 2025) to $15,000 ($376,948 in 2025) for Murnane's family.

Following Murnane's death, organizers announced plans to put on a benefit for Murnane's widow from his second marriage and their four children. Star players from other major-league clubs formed an all-star team to play against the Red Sox. Paid attendance was 17,119. The benefit game preceded the creation of the Major League Baseball All-Star Game, first contested in 1933, which raises money for the players' pension fund.

== Background ==
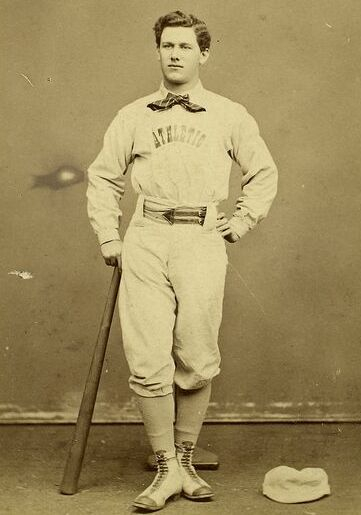
Murnane as a player, c. 1874

Murnane had a professional baseball career that spanned 1872–1880 and 1884–1885. This included four seasons for three different teams within the National Association, (Note: The status of the National Association as a major league is a matter of some dispute among baseball historians and researchers.) three seasons for two teams in the National League, and one season as a player-manager in the Union Association.

Outside of his playing career, Murnane held several jobs including running a billiard room, publishing his own sports periodical, and owning (albeit just for one month) a minor-league baseball team. In 1887, Murnane was hired as one of the first baseball writers for The Boston Globe; he remained with the newspaper until his death. He also served as president of the New England League, a mid-level baseball minor league, from 1892 until 1916.

Murnane died unexpectedly in February 1917 at a theatre in Boston. He had remarried in 1898 and had four children with his second wife—his first wife had died in 1895 after the couple had two children.

== Organization ==
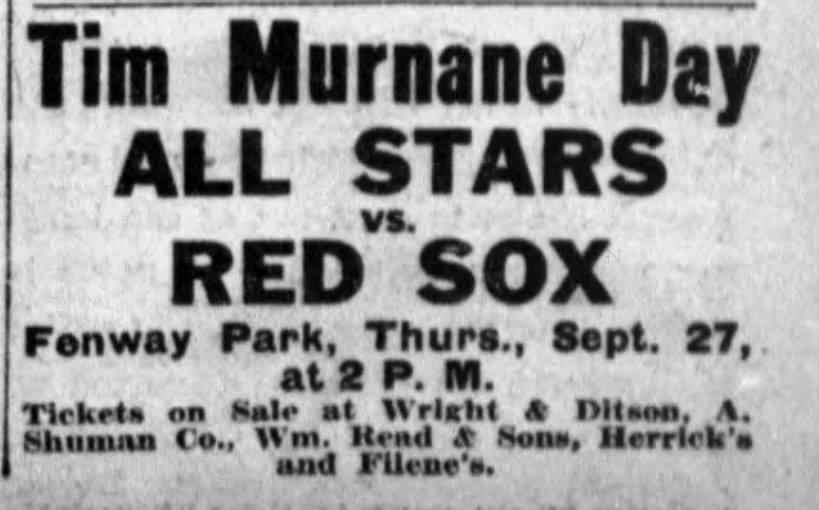
Notice for Tim Murnane Day in The Boston Globe

In order to fund a trust to serve as an education fund for the younger Murnane children, organizers—the Boston Red Sox, the American League, the Baseball Writers' Association of America (BBWAA), and former Red Sox owner John I. Taylor—announced an exhibition game would be played on September 27, an open day on the Red Sox' schedule. The overall event was announced as "Tim Murnane Day", as in addition to the benefit game, there would also be some individual competitions between the players. The organizing committee included Harry Frazee, owner and president of the Red Sox; Percy Haughton, owner and president of the Boston Braves; James Michael Curley, mayor of Boston; James A. Gallivan, member of the United States House of Representatives; William Francis Murray, postmaster of Boston; Joseph Lannin, former Red Sox owner; and Hugh Duffy, a former major-league player and manager. (Note: Hugh Duffy later served as manager of the Red Sox during the 1921 and 1922 seasons.)

== All-star team ==
At the time the game was played, the American League had eight teams. Six teams each contributed at least one player to the all-star squad: (Note: The only American League team, other than the Red Sox themselves, not to have a player on the all-star team was the St. Louis Browns.)

- Chicago White Sox (2): Shoeless Joe Jackson (OF), Buck Weaver (3B)
- Cleveland Indian (3): Ray Chapman (2B), Steve O'Neill (C), Tris Speaker (OF)
- Detroit Tigers (2): Ty Cobb (OF), Howard Ehmke (P)
- New York Yankees (2): Bob Shawkey (P), Urban Shocker (P)
- Philadelphia Athletics (2): Stuffy McInnis (1B), Wally Schang (C)
- Washington Senators (1): Walter Johnson (P)

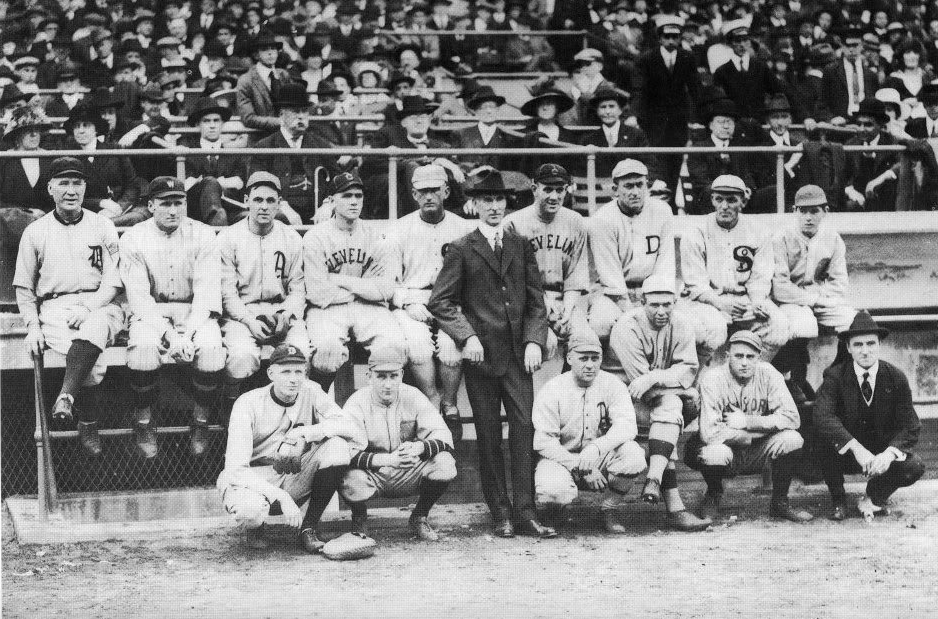
All-star team at Fenway Park

Additionally, the all-stars were managed by Connie Mack of Philadelphia with Detroit manager Hughie Jennings serving as a base coach, while Rabbit Maranville (SS) of the Boston Braves, a National League team, played on the all-star squad.

While September 27 was an off-day for four American League teams (Boston, Cleveland, Detroit, and New York), all-stars from Chicago, Philadelphia, and Washington missed their teams' games to play in the fund-raiser, as did Maranville. This was allowed because post-season berths were already decided, with the White Sox set to face the New York Giants in the upcoming 1917 World Series.

=== Team photo ===
There were 16 people in the team photo of the all-stars:

Back row (left to right)—Hughie Jennings (coach), Walter Johnson, Stuffy McInnis, Steve O'Neill, Shoeless Joe Jackson, Ray Chapman, Ty Cobb, Buck Weaver, Willie O'Connor (mascot) (Note: Willie O'Connor was the mascot of the Boston Braves.)

Front row (left to right)—Howard Ehmke, Rabbit Maranville, Connie Mack (manager, standing in suit), Wally Schang, Tris Speaker, Urban Shocker, Tom Raftery (in suit) (Note: Raftery, a native of Boston, had a brief major-league career, appearing in eight games for the 1909 Cleveland Naps.)

Absent from the photo was Bob Shawkey.

== Pre-game contests ==
Players competed in several individual contests before the game. Top finishers in the respective contests were:

Contest	First place	Second place	Third place
Throwing (distance)	Shoeless Joe Jackson (White Sox), 396 feet 8 inches (120.90 m)	Duffy Lewis (Red Sox), 384 feet 1 1/2 inches (117.081 m)	Tilly Walker (Red Sox), 383 feet 1 1/2 inches (116.777 m)
Fungo hitting (distance)	Babe Ruth (Red Sox), 402 feet 8 inches (122.73 m)	Carl Mays (Red Sox), 373 feet (114 m)	Walter Johnson (Senators), 360 feet (110 m)
Bunt and run to first (time)	Mike McNally (Red Sox), 3 1/5 seconds (Note: Running 90 feet in 3.2 seconds equates to 19.176 miles per hour (30.861 km/h))	Multiple players, 3 2/5 seconds	Multiple players, 3 3/5 seconds
Bunt and circle bases (time)	Ray Chapman (Indians), 14 seconds (Note: Running 360 feet in 14 seconds equates to 17.58 miles per hour (28.29 km/h))	Harry Hooper (Red Sox), 14 2/5 seconds	Mike McNally (Red Sox), 14 3/5 seconds
Throwing accuracy (home to second base)	Dutch Leonard (Red Sox)	—N/a	—N/a

== Game ==
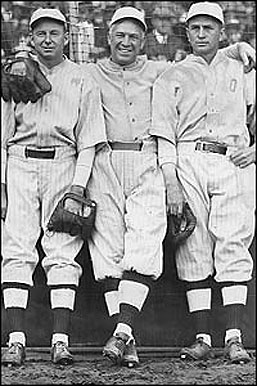
Duffy Lewis, Tris Speaker, and Harry Hooper, during their time as Red Sox teammates (1910–1915)

Nine participants in the game have been inducted to the National Baseball Hall of Fame: (Note: The inaugural class of the Hall of Fame was selected in 1936 and inducted in 1939, with Cobb, Ruth, and Johnson being three of the first five players selected.) players Ty Cobb, Harry Hooper, Walter Johnson, Rabbit Maranville, Babe Ruth, and Tris Speaker; all-stars manager and coach Connie Mack and Hughie Jennings; and home plate umpire Tom Connolly.

=== Linescore ===
September 27, 1917 at Fenway Park in Boston, Massachusetts
Team	1	2	3	4	5	6	7	8	9	R	H	E
All-Stars	0	0	0	0	0	0	0	0	0	0	3	1
Boston Red Sox	0	0	0	0	0	0	0	2	X	2	7	1
WP: Rube Foster LP: Walter Johnson; Attendance: 17,119; Umpires: Tom Connolly (home), Dick Nallin (bases); Box scores: 1, 2

=== Box score ===
Key
†	Member of the National Baseball Hall of Fame

All-Stars	AB	R	H
Rabbit Maranville,^{†} SS	4	0	0
Ray Chapman, 2B	1	0	1
Ty Cobb,^{†} CF	4	0	1
Tris Speaker,^{†} LF	3	0	0
Shoeless Joe Jackson, RF	4	0	0
Stuffy McInnis, 1B	4	0	1
Buck Weaver, 3B	3	0	0
Steve O'Neill, C	2	0	0
Wally Schang, C	1	0	0
Urban Shocker, P	0	0	0
Howard Ehmke, P	1	0	0
Walter Johnson,^{†} P	1	0	0
Team totals	28	0	3

All-Stars	IP	H	R	BB	SO
Urban Shocker	3	3	0	0	1
Howard Ehmke	3	1	0	1	0
Walter Johnson^{†} (L)	2	3	2	0	0
Team totals	8	7	2	1	1

Boston (AL)	AB	R	H
Harry Hooper,^{†} RF	4	0	0
Jack Barry, 2B	4	1	2
Dick Hoblitzell, 1B	3	1	2
Duffy Lewis, LF	4	0	1
Tilly Walker, CF	4	0	2
Larry Gardner 3B	3	0	0
Everett Scott, SS	3	0	0
Sam Agnew, C	2	0	0
Pinch Thomas, C	1	0	0
Babe Ruth,^{†} P	2	0	0
Rube Foster, P	1	0	0
Team totals	31	2	7

Boston (AL)	IP	H	R	BB	SO
Babe Ruth^{†}	5	3	0	3	1
Rube Foster (W)	4	0	0	2	0
Team totals	9	3	0	5	1

== See also ==
- Ace Bailey Benefit Game
- Addie Joss Benefit Game
