= Tom Raftery (baseball) =

American baseball player

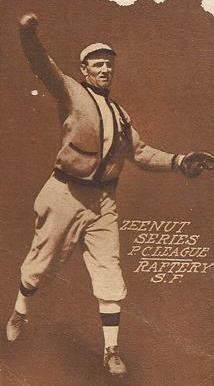
- Outfielder
- Born: October 5, 1881; Boston, Massachusetts, U.S.
- Died: December 31, 1954 (aged 73); Boston, Massachusetts, U.S.
- Batted: Right Threw: Right

MLB debut
- April 18, 1909, for the Cleveland Naps

Last MLB appearance
- June 27, 1909, for the Cleveland Naps

MLB statistics
- Games played: 8
- Batting average: .219
- Runs batted in: 0
- Stats at Baseball Reference

Teams
- Cleveland Naps (1909)

Thomas Francis Raftery (October 5, 1881 – December 31, 1954) was an American outfielder in Major League Baseball. He played eight games for the Cleveland Naps. Raftery was 5 feet, 10 inches tall and weighed 175 pounds.

== Career ==
Raftery was born in Boston, Massachusetts in 1881. He started his professional baseball career in 1904 with the New England League's Haverhill Hustlers. That season, he batted .288. In 1905, Raftery batted .345 in 21 games to lead the New England League in batting average. His contract was purchased by the South Atlantic League's Charleston Sea Gulls in June, and he batted .227 the rest of the year with his new team.

Raftery had one of his best seasons while playing for Charleston in 1907. In 120 games, he batted .301 and led the South Atlantic League in batting average, hits (128), and stolen bases (80). His 80 stolen bases set a league record. In September, he was voted a gold watch for being the team's most popular player, and the Sea Gulls won the pennant that year.

Raftery then spent one season in the Pacific Coast League before joining the Cleveland Naps for the 1909 season. He appeared in eight MLB games from April 18 to June 27 and batted .219 with three extra base hits. Sporting Life later wrote that Raftery "did fairly well, but was not quite up to the big league requirements." In July, he was sold to the American Association's Toledo Mud Hens. He batted .253 for them during the rest of the season.

For the next four years, Raftery bounced around the minor leagues, never batting above .288. He finished his career in the Texas League and Northern League in 1913.

Raftery died in Boston in 1954 and was buried in Dorchester North Cemetery.

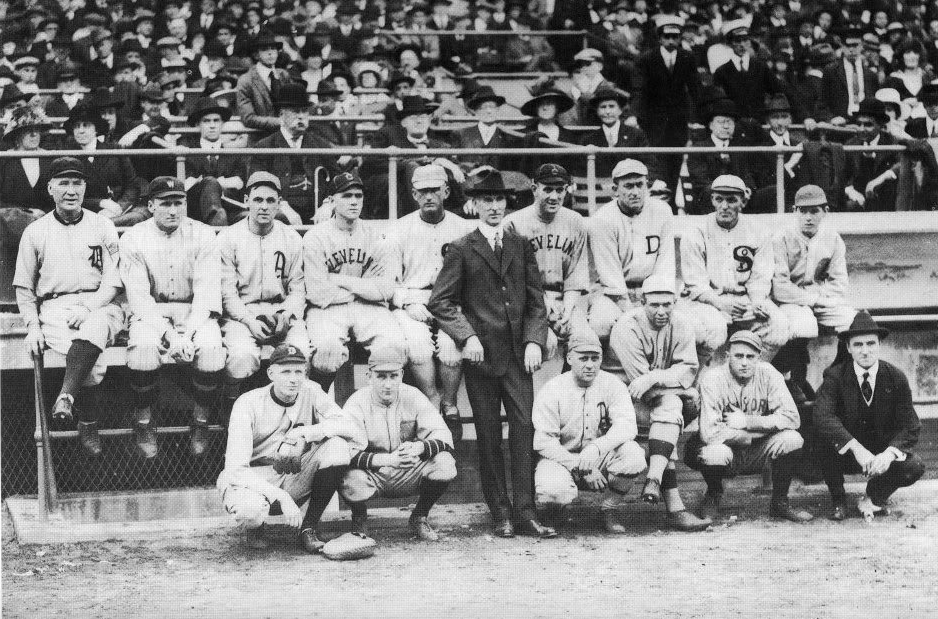
Raftery at lower-right (in suit) on September 27, 1917, at the Tim Murnane Benefit Game in Boston
