= Wilbur Murdoch =

American baseball player (1875–1941)

- Outfielder
- Born: March 14, 1875; Avon, New York, U.S.
- Died: October 29, 1941 (aged 66); Los Angeles, California, U.S.
- Batted: Unknown Threw: Right

MLB debut
- August 29, 1908, for the St. Louis Cardinals

Last MLB appearance
- October 3, 1908, for the St. Louis Cardinals

MLB statistics
- Batting average: .258
- Home runs: 0
- Runs batted in: 5
- Stats at Baseball Reference

Teams
- St. Louis Cardinals (1908)

Wilbur Edwin Murdoch (March 14, 1875 – October 29, 1941) was an American backup outfielder in Major League Baseball who played briefly for the St. Louis Cardinals during the 1908 season. He threw right-handed. His batting side is unknown.

A native of Avon, New York, Murdoch was 33 years old when he entered the majors with the Cardinals. In a 27-game career, he was a .258 hitter (16-for-62) with five runs and five RBI, including three doubles and four stolen bases without home runs.

Murdoch died in Los Angeles, California, at the age of 66.
