= Dick Nallin =

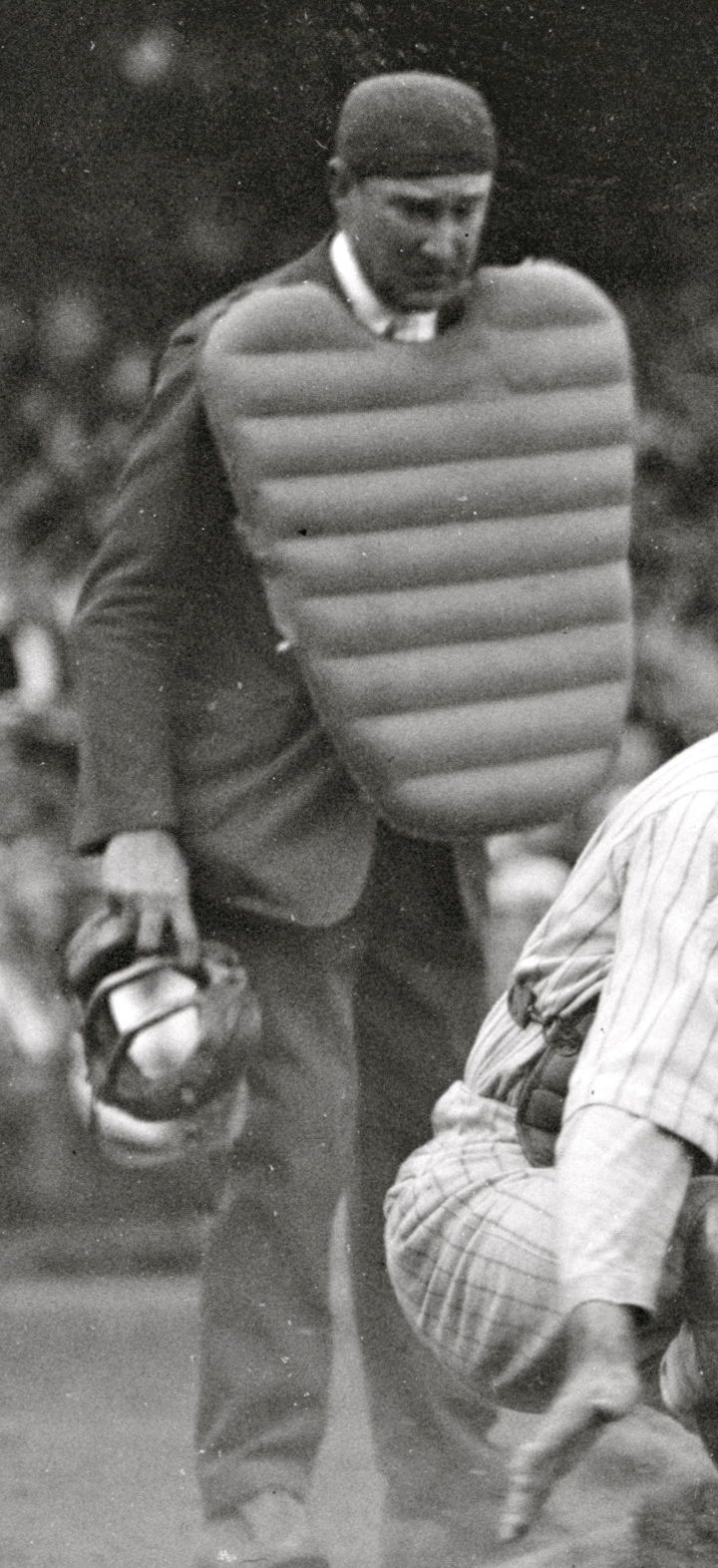
- Nallin umpiring in 1925
- Umpire
- Born: February 26, 1878; Scranton, Pennsylvania, U.S.
- Died: September 7, 1956 (aged 78); Frederick, Maryland, U.S.

American League debut
- April 14, 1915

Last appearance
- September 25, 1932
- Stats at Baseball Reference

Career highlights and awards
- 4 × World Series (1919, 1923, 1927, 1931)
Coaching career
Playing career
1898–1899	Villanova
Position	Halfback
Coaching career (HC unless noted)
1899	Villanova
Head coaching record
Overall	7–2–1

Richard Francis Nallin (February 26, 1878 – September 7, 1956) was an American baseball umpire and head coach in college football. He also played college football and played professionally in Minor League Baseball.

== Sports career ==
Nallin played college football for two season as a halfback for Villanova College—now known as Villanova University—and served as the team's head football coach in 1899, compiling a record of 7–2–1.

In baseball, Nallin had a professional career as an outfielder from 1904 through 1910, playing mainly for Class C and Class B teams. Nallin was a major-league umpire from 1915 to 1932 in the American League. He umpired in four different World Series. During his umpiring career, Nallin was home plate umpire for three no-hitters: Ernie Koob's on May 5, 1917; Bob Groom's the very next day; and Charlie Robertson's perfect game on April 30, 1922. Through the end of the 2010 season, only two other umpires had called balls and strikes for two no-hitters in the same month: Bill Dinneen in September 1923 and Bill Deegan in May 1977. Nallin was the base umpire for the Tim Murnane Benefit Game in September 1917, and was the home-plate umpire during Ty Cobb's final game on September 11, 1928.

== Head coaching record ==
Year	Team	Overall	Conference	Standing	Bowl/playoffs
Villanova Wildcats (Independent) (1899)
1899	Villanova	7–2–1			
Villanova:		7–2–1			
Total:		7–2–1			

== See also ==
- List of Major League Baseball umpires (disambiguation)
