= List of Los Angeles Dodgers no-hitters =

The Los Angeles Dodgers are a Major League Baseball franchise currently based in Los Angeles. They play in the National League West division. The franchise joined the American Association in 1884 as the "Brooklyn Atlantics". They have been known in their early years as the "Brooklyn Grays" (1885–1887), "Brooklyn Bridegrooms" (1888–1890, 1896–1898), "Brooklyn Grooms" (1891–1895), "Brooklyn Superbas" (1899–1910, 1913), "Brooklyn Robins" (1914–1931), and "Brooklyn Dodgers" (1911–12, 1932–1957). There have been 20 pitchers for the Dodgers that have thrown 25 no-hitters in franchise history. A no-hitter is officially recognized by Major League Baseball only "...when a pitcher (or pitchers) allows no hits during the entire course of a game, which consists of at least nine innings. In a no-hit game, a batter may reach base via a walk, an error, a hit by pitch, a passed ball or wild pitch on strike three, or catcher's interference". No-hitters of less than nine complete innings were previously recognized by the league as official; however, several rule alterations in 1991 changed the rule to its current form. A no-hitter is common enough that, as of April 9, 2021, every Major League Baseball team has had a pitcher accomplish the feat.^{[a]}

Hall of Famer Sandy Koufax threw four no-hitters, including a perfect game, for the Dodgers

There has been one perfect game thrown by a Dodgers pitcher. A perfect game is defined by Major League Baseball as occurring "when a pitcher (or pitchers) retires each batter on the opposing team during the entire course of a game, which consists of at least nine innings. In a perfect game, no batter reaches any base during the course of the game." This feat was achieved by Sandy Koufax on September 9, 1965. It was Koufax's fourth career no-hitter, and is the franchise record for no-hitters by one pitcher. At the time, Koufax's four no-hitters was the major league record for any pitcher, but has since been surpassed in 1981 by Nolan Ryan who ended his career with seven.

Sam Kimber threw the first no-hitter in Dodgers history on October 4, 1884, which ended as a scoreless tie after ten innings. The most recent no-hitter thrown by a Dodgers pitcher was on May 4, 2018 by four pitchers. Walker Buehler 3rd career start 6 IP, Tony Cingrani 1 IP, Adam Liberatore 1 IP, and Yimi Garcia 1 IP. It was the first no hitter outside of United States or Canada as it was pitched in Monterrey, Mexico. It was also the first combined no hitter in franchise history. Five of the 20 pitchers were left-handed pitchers, 14 were right-handed, and one, Tom Lovett, is still unknown. In addition to Koufax, two other Dodgers pitchers have thrown multiple no-hitters, Adonis Terry and Carl Erskine. 18 of the no-hitters were thrown at home and eight on the road. The longest interval between no-hitters was between the games pitched by Hideo Nomo and Josh Beckett, encompassing 17 years and 250 days from September 17, 1996 until May 25, 2014. Conversely, the shortest interval between no-hitters was between the games pitched by Beckett and Clayton Kershaw, encompassing merely 24 days from May 25, 2014 until June 18, 2014. The San Francisco Giants (formerly "New York Giants") have been no-hit six times, the most by any Dodgers opponent. Dazzy Vance is the only Dodgers no-hit pitcher to have allowed at least one run. The most baserunners allowed in any of these game were by Terry (in 1886) and Koufax (in 1962), who each allowed five. Of the 26 no-hitters, five have been won by a score of 5–0 and four by the score of 3–0, more common than any other results. The largest margin of victory in a no-hitter was a 9–0 win by Hideo Nomo in 1996 and a 10–1 win by Vance in 1925. The smallest margins of victory were 1–0 wins by Terry in 1888 and Koufax in 1965.

The umpire is an integral part of any no-hitter. The task of the umpire in a baseball game is to make any decision "which involves judgment, such as, but not limited to, whether a batted ball is fair or foul, whether a pitch is a strike or a ball, or whether a runner is safe or out… [the umpire's judgment on such matters] is final." Part of the duties of the umpire making calls at home plate includes defining the strike zone, which "is defined as that area over homeplate (sic) the upper limit of which is a horizontal line at the midpoint between the top of the shoulders and the top of the uniform pants, and the lower level is a line at the hollow beneath the kneecap." These calls define every baseball game and are therefore integral to the completion of any no-hitter. There have been 24 different home plate umpires who have called Dodgers no-hitters; Babe Pinelli is the only umpire to have called two.

== List of no-hitters in Dodgers history ==
| ¶ | Indicates a perfect game |
| £ | Pitcher was left-handed |
| * | Member of the National Baseball Hall of Fame and Museum |

| # | Date | Pitcher | Final score | Base- runners | Opponent | Catcher | Plate umpire | Manager | Notes | Ref |
|---|---|---|---|---|---|---|---|---|---|---|
| 1 | October 4, 1884 | Sam Kimber | 0–0 (10) | 4 | Toledo Blue Stockings | Jack Corcoran | John Dyler | George Taylor | First no-hitter in franchise history; First no-hitter at home in franchise history; First right-handed pitcher to throw a no-hitter in franchise history; First extra-inning no-hitter in franchise history and first in MLB history; Latest calendar date of franchise's no-hitter; Only no–hitter in MLB history to end in a tie | |
| 2 | July 24, 1886 | Adonis Terry (1) | 4–0 | 5 | St. Louis Browns | Jimmy Peoples (1) | Mike Walsh | Charlie Byrne | | |
| 3 | May 27, 1888 | Adonis Terry (2) | 1–0 | 1 | Louisville Colonels | Jimmy Peoples (2) | Herm Doscher | Bill McGunnigle | Smallest margin of victory in a franchise's no-hitter (tie) | |
| 4 | June 22, 1891 | Tom Lovett | 4–0 | 1 | New York Giants | Con Daily | Jack McQuaid | Monte Ward | | |
| 5 | July 20, 1906 | Mal Eason | 2–0 | 2 | @ St. Louis Cardinals | Lew Ritter | Bill Carpenter | Patsy Donovan (1) | First no-hitter on the road in franchise history | |
| 6 | September 5, 1908 | Nap Rucker^{£} | 6–0 | 3 | Boston Doves | Bill Bergen | Jim Johnstone | Patsy Donovan (2) | First left-handed pitcher to throw a no-hitter in franchise history; Second game of a doubleheader | |
| 7 | September 13, 1925 | Dazzy Vance* | 10–1 | 1 | Philadelphia Phillies | Hank DeBerry | Cy Pfirman | Wilbert Robinson | First game of a doubleheader; Largest margin of victory in a franchise's no-hitter (tie); First and only franchise's no-hitter while allowing a run | |
| 8 | April 30, 1940 | Tex Carleton | 3–0 | 3 | @ Cincinnati Reds | Herman Franks | Bill Stewart | Leo Durocher (1) | | |
| 9 | April 23, 1946 | Ed Head | 5–0 | 3 | Boston Braves | Ferrell Anderson | Babe Pinelli (1) | Leo Durocher (2) | Earliest calendar date of franchise's no-hitter | |
| 10 | September 9, 1948 | Rex Barney | 2–0 | 2 | @ New York Giants | Bruce Edwards | Babe Pinelli (2) | Leo Durocher (3) | First game of a doubleheader | |
| 11 | June 19, 1952 | Carl Erskine (1) | 5–0 | 1 | Chicago Cubs | Roy Campanella (1) | Jocko Conlan | Chuck Dressen | | |
| 12 | May 12, 1956 | Carl Erskine (2) | 3–0 | 2 | New York Giants | Roy Campanella (2) | Augie Donatelli | Walter Alston (1) | | |
| 13 | September 25, 1956 | Sal Maglie | 5–0 | 3 | Philadelphia Phillies | Roy Campanella (3) | Hal Dixon | Walter Alston (2) | Last no-hitter before moving to Los Angeles | |
| 14 | June 30, 1962 | Sandy Koufax^{£}* (1) | 5–0 | 5 | New York Mets | John Roseboro (1) | Mel Steiner | Walter Alston (3) | First no-hitter since moving to Los Angeles; Most baserunners allowed in a franchise's no-hitter | |
| 15 | May 11, 1963 | Sandy Koufax^{£}* (2) | 8–0 | 2 | San Francisco Giants | John Roseboro (2) | Harry Wendelstedt | Walter Alston (4) | | |
| 16 | June 4, 1964 | Sandy Koufax^{£}* (3) | 3–0 | 1 | @ Philadelphia Phillies | Doug Camilli | Al Forman | Walter Alston (5) | Only baserunner was a walk to Dick Allen, who was then caught stealing | |
| 17 | September 9, 1965 | Sandy Koufax^{£¶}* (4) | 1–0 | 0 | Chicago Cubs | Jeff Torborg (1) | Ed Vargo | Walter Alston (6) | First and only perfect game in Dodgers history; Dodgers only managed two baserunners and one hit, setting records for fewest baserunners and hits in a game by both teams combined; Smallest margin of victory in a franchise's no-hitter (tie); See also: Sandy Koufax's perfect game | |
| 18 | July 20, 1970 | Bill Singer | 5–0 | 3 | Philadelphia Phillies | Jeff Torborg (2) | Ed Sudol | Walter Alston (7) | Singer did not allow any walks, but hit one batter and committed two errors | |
| 19 | June 27, 1980 | Jerry Reuss^{£} | 8–0 | 1 | @ San Francisco Giants | Steve Yeager | Jim Quick | Tom Lasorda (1) | Only baserunner came on SS Bill Russell's error with 2 outs in the 1st | |
| 20 | June 29, 1990 | Fernando Valenzuela^{£} | 6–0 | 3 | St. Louis Cardinals | Mike Scioscia (1) | Jerry Layne | Tom Lasorda (2) | Second of two no-hitters thrown on the same day | |
| 21 | August 17, 1992 | Kevin Gross | 2–0 | 3 | San Francisco Giants | Mike Scioscia (2) | Mike Winters | Tom Lasorda (3) | | |
| 22 | July 14, 1995 | Ramón Martínez | 7–0 | 1 | Florida Marlins | Mike Piazza (1) | Eric Gregg | Tom Lasorda (4) | On June 3 of that same season, Martínez's brother Pedro pitched nine perfect innings but had the bid broken up by a leadoff single in the 10th. Otherwise, the Martínezes would have become the second brother combo, after the Forsches (Ken and Bob), to pitch Major League no-hitters, and the first to do so during the same season.; Lost perfect game on a walk with two outs in the eighth inning; did not allow another base runner. | |
| 23 | September 17, 1996 | Hideo Nomo | 9–0 | 4 | @ Colorado Rockies | Mike Piazza (2) | Bill Hohn | Bill Russell | First and only no hitter thrown at Coors Field; Largest margin of victory in a franchise's no-hitter (tie) | |
| 24 | May 25, 2014 | Josh Beckett | 6–0 | 3 | @ Philadelphia Phillies | Drew Butera | Brian Knight | Don Mattingly (1) | Longest interval between no-hitters in franchise history | |
| 25 | June 18, 2014 | Clayton Kershaw^{£} | 8–0 | 1 | Colorado Rockies | A. J. Ellis | Greg Gibson | Don Mattingly (2) | Shortest interval between no-hitters in franchise history; Only baserunner came on SS Hanley Ramírez's error with no outs in the 7th | |
| 26 | May 4, 2018 | Walker Buehler (6 IP); Tony Cingrani^{£} (1 IP); Yimi García (1 IP); Adam Liberatore^{£} (1 IP) | 4–0 | 4 | San Diego Padres | Yasmani Grandal | John Tumpane | Dave Roberts | Most recent no-hitter in franchise history; First combined no-hitter in franchise history; Game played at Estadio de Béisbol Monterrey in Mexico; First no-hitter thrown outside of the United States and Canada | |

== Bibliography ==
- Bronson, Eric (2004). Baseball and Philosophy: Thinking Outside the Batter's Box. Publishers Group West. ISBN 9780812695564.
