= Bill Greenwood (baseball) =

American baseball player (1857–1902)

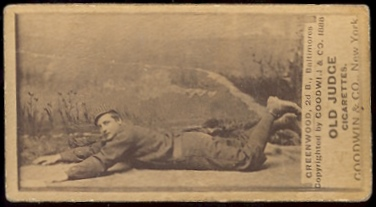
- Second baseman
- Born: April 19, 1857; Philadelphia, Pennsylvania, US
- Died: May 2, 1902 (aged 45); Philadelphia, Pennsylvania, US
- Batted: Both Threw: Left

MLB debut
- September 16, 1882, for the Philadelphia Athletics

Last MLB appearance
- October 15, 1890, for the Rochester Broncos

MLB statistics
- Batting average: .226
- Home runs: 8
- Runs batted in: 185
- Stats at Baseball Reference

Teams
- Philadelphia Athletics (1882); Brooklyn Atlantics (1884); Baltimore Orioles (1887–1888); Columbus Solons (1889); Rochester Broncos (1890)

Career highlights and awards
- Played 538 games in the infield, most in history by a left-handed player

William F. Greenwood (April 19, 1857 – May 2, 1902) was an American Major League Baseball player (mostly a second baseman) for six seasons from 1882 to 1890. He played more games at second base than any other left-handed player.

== Career ==
Greenwood was fast and was often among the league leaders in stolen bases, but he usually hit for a mediocre batting average. He was a left-handed infielder, not entirely uncommon in the 19th century, and he is the all-time leader in games played at second base by a left-hander with 538. He also played 30 games at shortstop.

For the 1883 season, he signed and was playing for the Merrits of Camden, New Jersey, when Charlie Byrne of a fellow league team, the Brooklyn Grays, bought his contract, along with other Merrits Sam Kimber, Charlie Householder, Frank Fennelly, and Jack Corcoran. He finished out the year and transitioned with the team over to the American Association, where they would be known as the Atlantics.

Playing in the AA until 1890, Greenwood changed teams every year, except for 1887-88, when he played two seasons for the Baltimore Orioles. His 1887 season with Baltimore was one of his best; he hit .263, recorded 65 RBI, and stole 71 bases. During an 1887 home game, Greenwood was on the receiving end of a collision at second base from St. Louis Browns outfielder Curt Welch. The collision angered Baltimore fans, and St. Louis players had to run off the field to avoid the irate fans.

The next year, his batting average fell to .191 and he did not hit above .225 again in the major leagues.

Greenwood thought that his biggest struggle as a left-handed middle infielder was fielding ground balls, but he also had a problem that would be expected of a left-hander: making quick, accurate throws to first base. Compounding his problems was that he liked to drink to excess, so he sometimes got on the bad side of a manager with his behavior.

== Post-career ==
Greenwood died in his hometown of Philadelphia at the age of 45. He had a heart attack while discussing the Athletics game that had been played that day. He is interred at the Mount Moriah Cemetery in Philadelphia.

== See also ==
- List of Major League Baseball career stolen bases leaders
