= Charlie Householder =

American baseball player (1854–1913)

- First baseman/Catcher
- Born: February 8, 1854; Philadelphia, Pennsylvania, US
- Died: September 3, 1913 (aged 59); Philadelphia, Pennsylvania, US
- Batted: Left Threw: Left

MLB debut
- May 2, 1882, for the Baltimore Orioles

Last MLB appearance
- October 15, 1884, for the Brooklyn Atlantics

MLB statistics
- Batting average: .248
- Home runs: 4
- RBIs: 0
- Stats at Baseball Reference

Teams
- Baltimore Orioles (1882); Brooklyn Atlantics (1884)

Charles W. Householder (February 8, 1854 – September 3, 1913) was an American Major League Baseball played mainly as a first baseman and catcher for the Baltimore Orioles in 1882 and the Brooklyn Atlantics in 1884.

== Career ==
On July 18, 1882, pitcher Tony Mullane of the Louisville Eclipse, normally a right-handed pitcher, began to pitch left-handed whenever a Baltimore Oriole left-handed hitter would come to bat. This strategy appeared to work until the ninth inning when left-handed hitting Charlie Householder hit a home run to win the game for the Orioles.

For the 1883 season, Householder signed with and was playing for the Merrits of Camden, New Jersey, when Charlie Byrne of fellow league team, the Brooklyn Grays bought his contract, along with other Merrits Sam Kimber, Bill Greenwood, Frank Fennelly, and Jack Corcoran. He finished out the year and transitioned with the team over to the American Association, where they would be known as the Atlantics.

On October 4, 1884, Householder collected two of the Atlantics four hits off Tony Mullane, this time of the Toledo Blue Stockings, a single and a double. The game went 10 innings and was called because of darkness, ending in a 0-0 tie, with Atlantic pitcher Sam Kimber recording the first extra-inning no-hitter.

Householder died in his hometown of Philadelphia at the age of 59, and is interred at Mount Vernon Cemetery in Philadelphia.
