= History of the Los Angeles Dodgers =

The history of the Los Angeles Dodgers Major League Baseball (MLB) team begins in the 19th century when the team was based in Brooklyn, New York.

== Brooklyn Dodgers history ==
The franchise now known as the Dodgers was originally formed in 1883 as a member of the minor league Inter-State Association of Professional Baseball Clubs. It moved to the American Association the following year and eventually to the National League in 1890. The team went by a number of press-bestowed nicknames including the Brooklyn Atlantics, Brooklyn Grays, Brooklyn Bridegrooms, Brooklyn Grooms, Brooklyn Superbas, and Brooklyn Robins before the team settled on Brooklyn Dodgers (from Trolley Dodgers) in the World War 1 era. During the Brooklyn era, the team won the AA championship in 1889 and National League championships 12 times (1890, 1899, 1900, 1916, 1920, 1941, 1947, 1949, 1952, 1953, 1955 1956) and won their first World Series championship in 1955.

The Brooklyn Dodgers had several Hall of Fame players on their rosters during this era including Roy Campanella, Leo Durocher, Burleigh Grimes, Willie Keeler, Pee Wee Reese, Wilbert Robinson, Duke Snider, Dazzy Vance, Zack Wheat and Jackie Robinson. Robinson, the first African American to officially break the Baseball color line, made his debut as a Dodger in 1947 and won the first Rookie of the Year award.

The Brooklyn Dodgers played their final game at Ebbets Field on September 24, 1957, which the Dodgers won 2–0 over the Pittsburgh Pirates.

== Los Angeles Dodgers ==
=== The Alston years ===
For 23 years, beginning in 1954, the Dodgers had been managed by Walter Alston, who was known as a quiet and reserved man. Alston's tenure is the third-longest in baseball history for a manager with a single team, after Connie Mack and John McGraw. On April 18, 1958, the Los Angeles Dodgers played their first game in the city, defeating the (formerly New York) San Francisco Giants, 6–5, before 78,672 fans at the Los Angeles Memorial Coliseum.

The process of building Walter O'Malley's dream stadium soon began in semi-rural Chavez Ravine, in the hills just north of downtown L.A. The decision caused political controversy as the residents of the ravine, a predominantly poor Hispanic population, resisted the eminent domain removal of their homes (land which had been previously condemned for a public housing project, Elysian Park Heights) and garnered public attention. Despite the controversy, O'Malley and the city government proceeded with the stadium construction. The resistance of the residents against their removal was known as the Battle of Chavez Ravine.

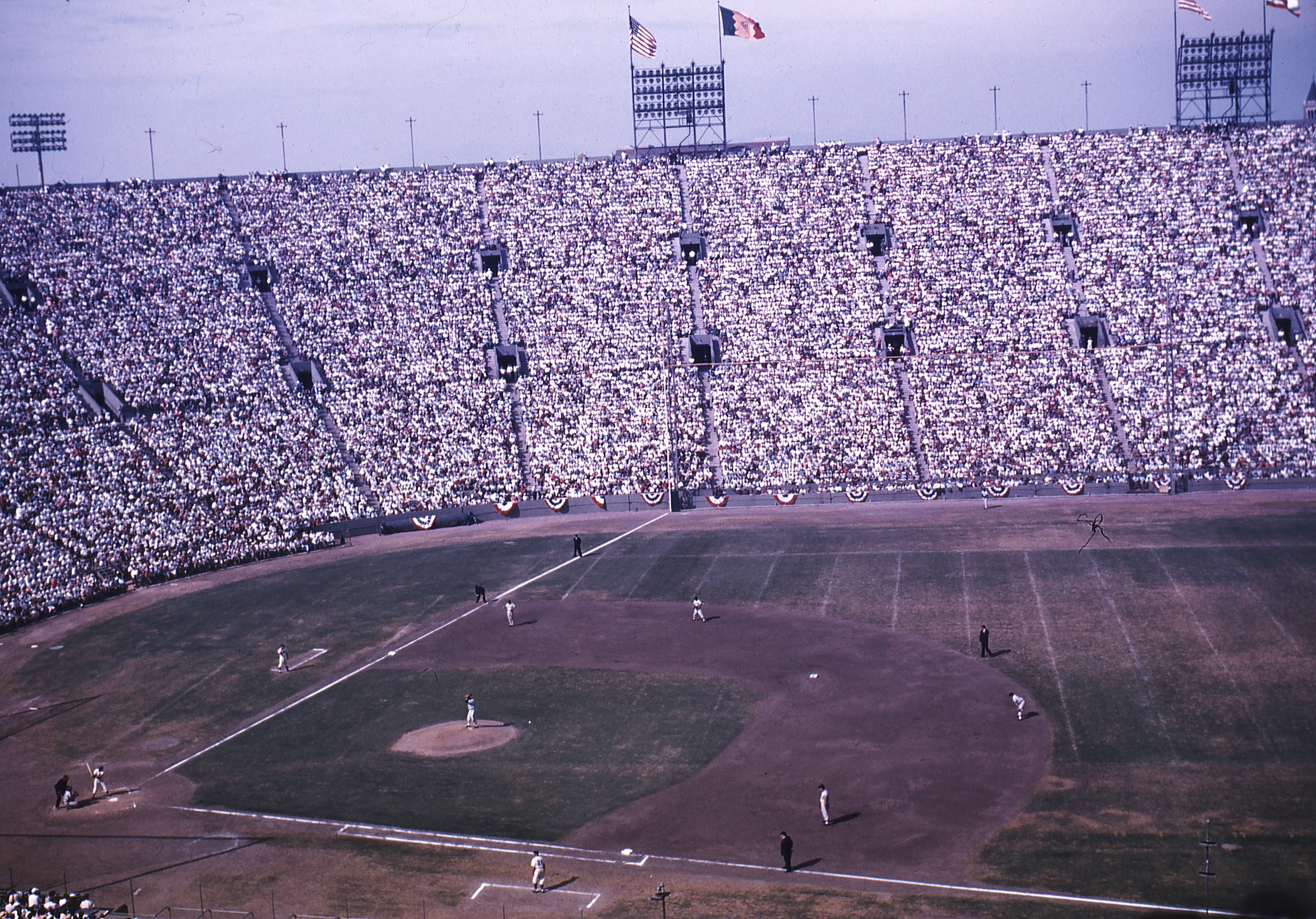
The Los Angeles Memorial Coliseum, pictured during the 1959 World Series

During stadium construction, the Dodgers played their home games from 1958 to 1961 at the Los Angeles Memorial Coliseum, a combination football and track-and-field stadium that had been built in 1923, and then expanded to host the 1932 Summer Olympics. The Coliseum's dimensions were not optimal for baseball, and the best way to fit a baseball diamond into the oval-shaped stadium was to lay the third-base line parallel to the short axis of the oval, and the first-base parallel to the long axis. This resulted in a left-field fence that was only 250 feet (76 m) from home plate. A 40-foot (12 m) high screen was erected to prevent home runs from becoming too trivial to hit. Still, the 1958 season saw 182 home runs hit to left field in the home games, whereas just three were hit to center field, and only eight to right field. The Dodgers outfielder Wally Moon, newly acquired for the 1959 season, was known for launching lazy fly balls over or onto the screen, which earned the moniker "Moon shots", contributing to his National League triples lead in 1959.

In 1959, the season ended in a tie between the Dodgers and the Milwaukee Braves. The Dodgers won the tie-breaking playoff. 1959 also saw a team other than the Yankees win the A.L. pennant, one of only two such years in the 16-year stretch from 1949 through 1964. As a result of the Dodgers' move to Los Angeles, this was the first World Series since 1948 to have no games in New York City. In an eventful World Series, the Dodgers defeated the "Go-Go" White Sox in six games, cementing the bond between the baseball team and its new Southern California fans.

Commemorating their 50th year in Los Angeles, the Dodgers would play one more game in the Memorial Coliseum on March 29, 2008 – an exhibition game to benefit a cancer research charity. The crowd size of 115,300, the most-attended game in baseball history[https://www.latimes.com/archives/la-xpm-2008-mar-30-sp-coliseum30-story.html], saw the Dodgers lose to the Boston Red Sox by a score of 7–4. Due to intervening renovations, the Coliseum's left field corner was shortened to only 190 feet (58 m), calling for a taller left-field fence of 60 feet (18 m). Kevin Cash of the Red Sox and James Loney of the Dodgers did hit home runs over that fence, but there were few total home runs in the game.

Despite the passage of 60-plus years since departing from Brooklyn, many in the borough, and the nation, continue efforts to encourage a move back east. Many of these efforts take the shape of letter writing campaigns, online petitions and nostalgic articles. Brooklyn Dodgers merchandise is still popular among fans as well. Major League Baseball estimates $9 million in sales every year. The Baseball Hall of Fame reports that Brooklyn photos and broadcasts are the museum's second biggest sellers behind the Yankees, eBay lists close to 1,000 items a day relating to the Brooklyn Dodgers, and the Library of Congress has over 100 books on Brooklyn Dodger teams, third only to the Yankees and Red Sox.

There were occasional attempts to move the Dodgers back to Brooklyn. State Senator Thomas J. Bartosiewicz tried hard to persuade them in the early 1980s, but was rebuffed. A stronger chance was in 1998, when the O'Malley family sold the team to Rupert Murdoch's Fox company. In the course of bidding, a committee convened by the City and State of New York (including Roger Kahn, author of Boys of Summer) made an offer to the club which was turned down, despite being larger than the eventual sale price.

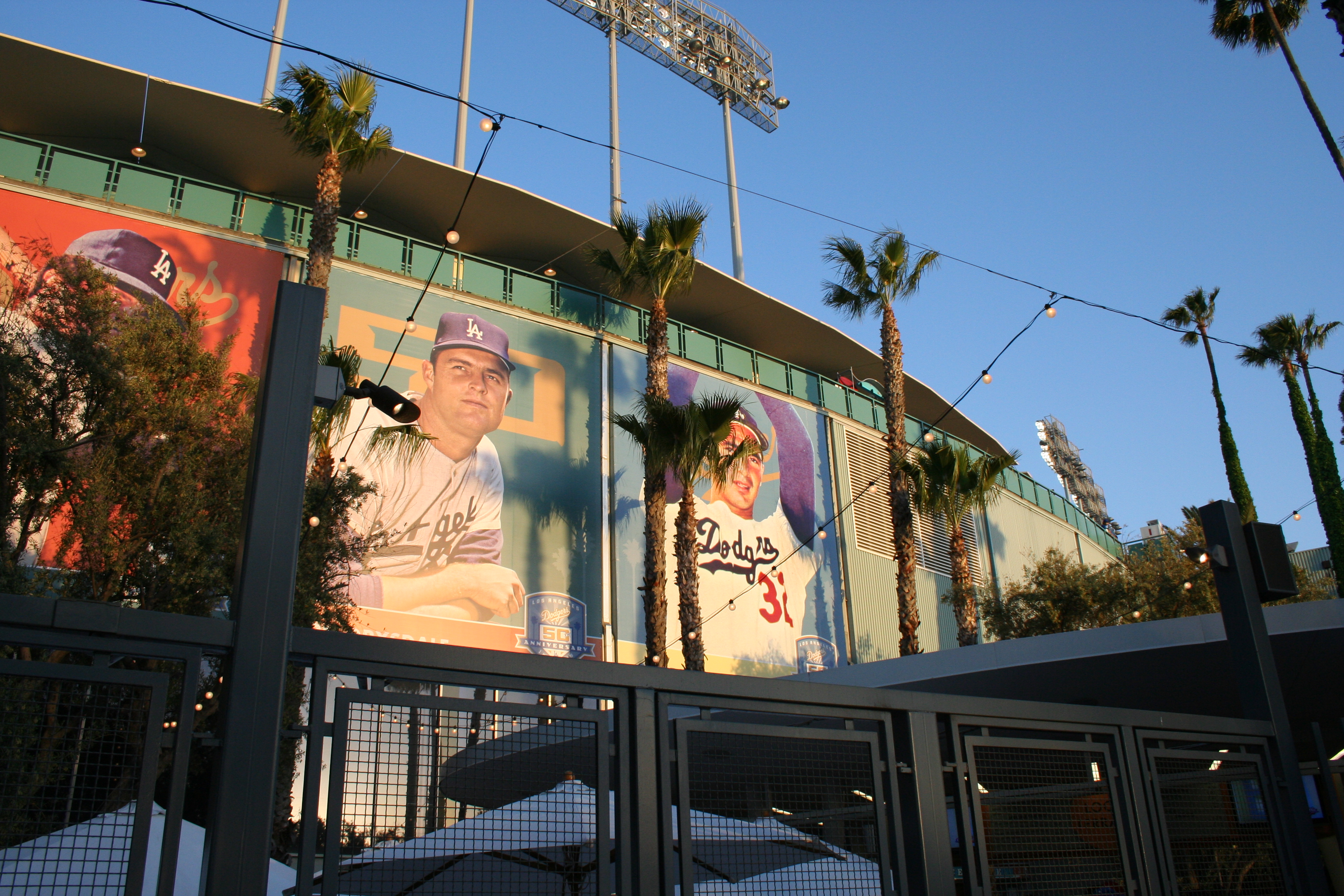
Former Dodger greats adorn the exterior of Dodger Stadium.

Construction for Dodger Stadium was completed before Opening Day in 1962. With its simple lines and setting amid hills and palm trees, the ballpark quickly became an icon of the Dodgers and their new California lifestyle. O'Malley wanted to ensure all seats had a view of the field, achieving this with cantilevered grandstands.

Hall of Famer Sandy Koufax

The core of the team's success in the 1960s was the dominant pitching tandem of Sandy Koufax and Don Drysdale, who combined to win 4 of the 5 Cy Young Awards from 1962 to 1966, during a time in which only one award was given to the top pitcher from either of the two major leagues. Top pitching also came from Claude Osteen, an aging Johnny Podres, and reliever Ron Perranoski. The hitting attack, on the other hand, was not impressive, and much of the offensive spark came from the exploits of speedy shortstop Maury Wills, who led the league in stolen bases every year from 1960 to 1965, and set a modern record with 104 thefts in 1962. The Dodgers' strategy was once described as follows: "Wills hits a single, steals second, and takes third on a grounder. A sacrifice fly brings him home. Koufax or Drysdale pitches a shutout, and the Dodgers win 1–0." Although few games followed this model exactly, the Dodgers nevertheless tallied a high proportion of wins in a low-scoring manner that relied on their pitching and defense rather than their offense – with the exception of a few seasons. For example, in 1962, Tommy Davis led the Major Leagues with 153 RBI, and he led the National League in batting average and in hits. Seasons of over 150 RBI are quite rare by a player in modern-day pro baseball. Davis led the league in batting twice for the Dodgers.

The 1962 pennant race ended in a tie, and the Dodgers were defeated by the archrival Giants in the tie-breaking playoff, but the Dodgers proceeded to win the pennant in three of the next four years. The 1963 World Series was a four-game sweep of the Yankees, in which the Dodgers were so dominant that the vaunted Bronx Bombers never even took a lead against Koufax, Podres, and Drysdale. After an injury-plagued 1964, the Dodgers bounced back to win the 1965 World Series in a seven games against the Minnesota Twins. Game one happened to fall on the Yom Kippur holiday, and Koufax (who is Jewish) refused to pitch on that day, a decision for which he was widely praised. The Dodgers rebounded from losing the first two games, with Koufax pitching shutouts in Games five and seven (with only two days rest in between) to win the crown and the World Series MVP Award.

The Dodgers again won the pennant in 1966, but the team was running out of gas, and it was swept in the World Series by the upstart Baltimore Orioles. Koufax retired that winter, with his career cut short by arthritis in the elbow of his pitching arm, and Maury Wills was traded away. Don Drysdale continued to be effective, setting a record with six consecutive shutouts in 1968, but he finished with just a 14–12 record due to the Dodgers' poor hitting that year.

While the Dodgers were sub-par for several seasons thereafter, a new core of young talent was developing in their farm system. They won another pennant in 1974, and although they were quickly dismissed by the dynastic Oakland Athletics in the World Series, it was a sign of good things to come. Steve Garvey was named the National League MVP in 1974, while Mike Marshall won the National League Cy Young Award. Marshall also set a Major League record for most appearances by a relief pitcher in 1974, appearing in 106 games, a record that still stands as of 2020.

=== The late 1970s: The early Lasorda years ===
Alston, after winning 7 pennants and 4 World Series titles over his career, retired 4 games before the end of the 1976 season, passing the position to Tommy Lasorda, a 49-year-old former minor-league pitcher who had been the team's top coach under Alston, and before that had been manager of the Dodgers' top minor league team. He was known for being colorful and gregarious cheerleader in contrast to Alston's taciturn demeanor. He quickly became a larger-than-life personality, associating with Frank Sinatra and other celebrities, with a penchant for eating Italian food in large volumes. He became well known for sayings such as, "If you cut me, I bleed Dodger blue", and for referring to God as "the Great Dodger in the sky". Although some considered his persona to be a schtick and found it wearing, his enthusiasm won him a reputation as an "ambassador for baseball", and made a lasting impression of the Dodgers from the late 1970s to the early 1990s.

Another transition had recently occurred, higher up in the Dodgers management. Walter O'Malley passed control of the team to his son Peter, who would continue to oversee the Dodgers on his family's behalf through 1998.

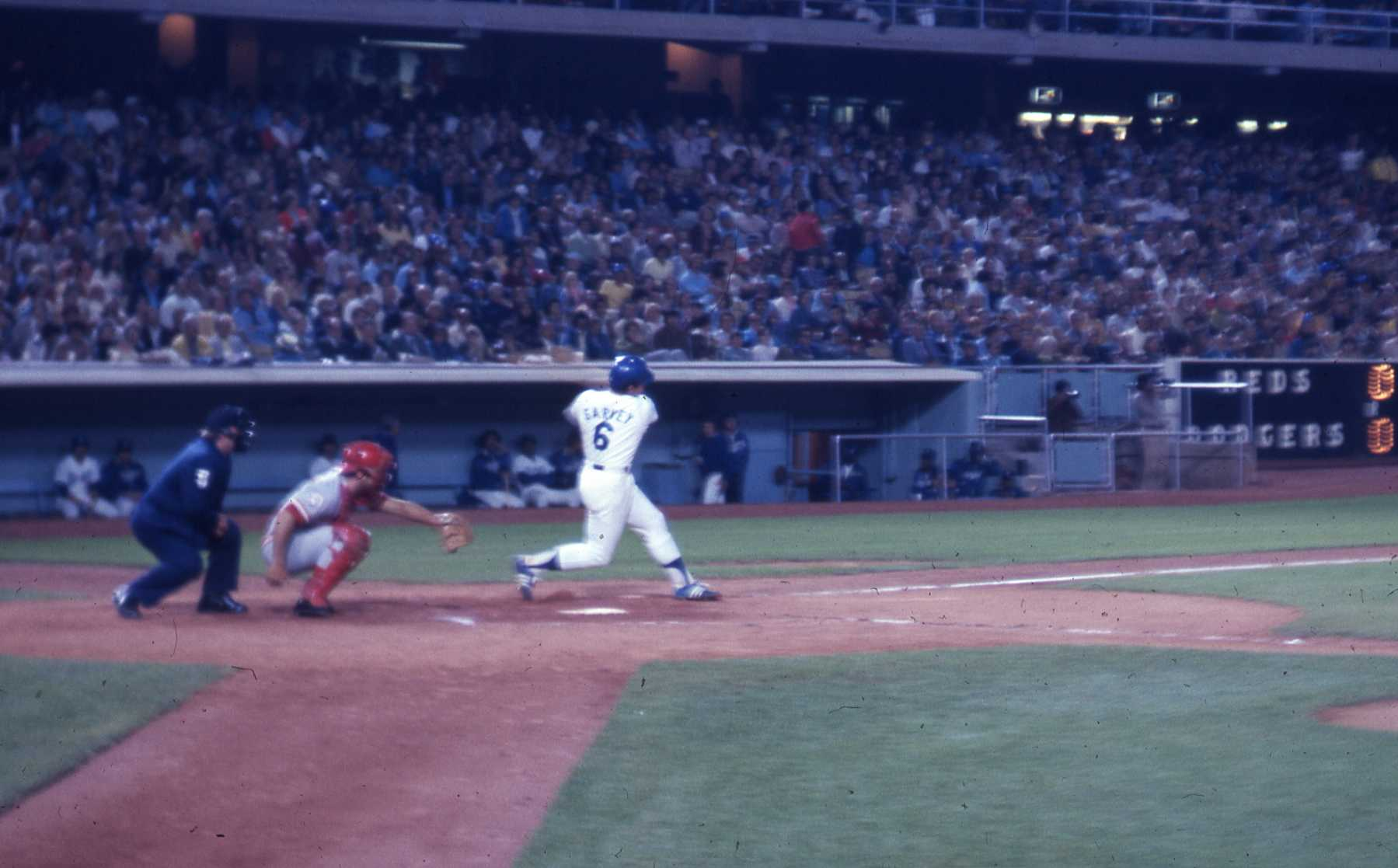
Steve Garvey at bat in the mid-1970s against the Cincinnati Reds, who were one of the Dodgers biggest rival during this period, along with the Yankees

New blood had also been injected into the team on the field. The core of the team was now the infield, composed of Steve Garvey (1B), Davey Lopes (2B), Bill Russell (SS), Ron Cey (3B), and Steve Yeager (C). These five remained in the starting lineup together from 1973 to 1981, longer than any other infield fivesome in baseball history. The pitching staff remained strong, anchored by Don Sutton and Tommy John. The Dodgers won NL West titles in both 1977 and 1978, and defeated the Philadelphia Phillies both years in the National League Championship Series, only to be defeated in the World Series both years by the Yankees. In 1980, they swept a three-game series from the Houston Astros in the final weekend of the regular season (including a famous save by Don Sutton) and were in a first place tie in the National League West, but lost to the Astros 7–1 in the one-game playoff.

The Dodgers also had a string four consecutive players take home Rookie of the Year awards from 1979 to 1982: Rick Sutcliffe won in 1979, Steve Howe in 1980, Fernando Valenzeula in 1981, and Steve Sax in 1982.

=== The 1980s: Fernandomania and the Bulldog ===
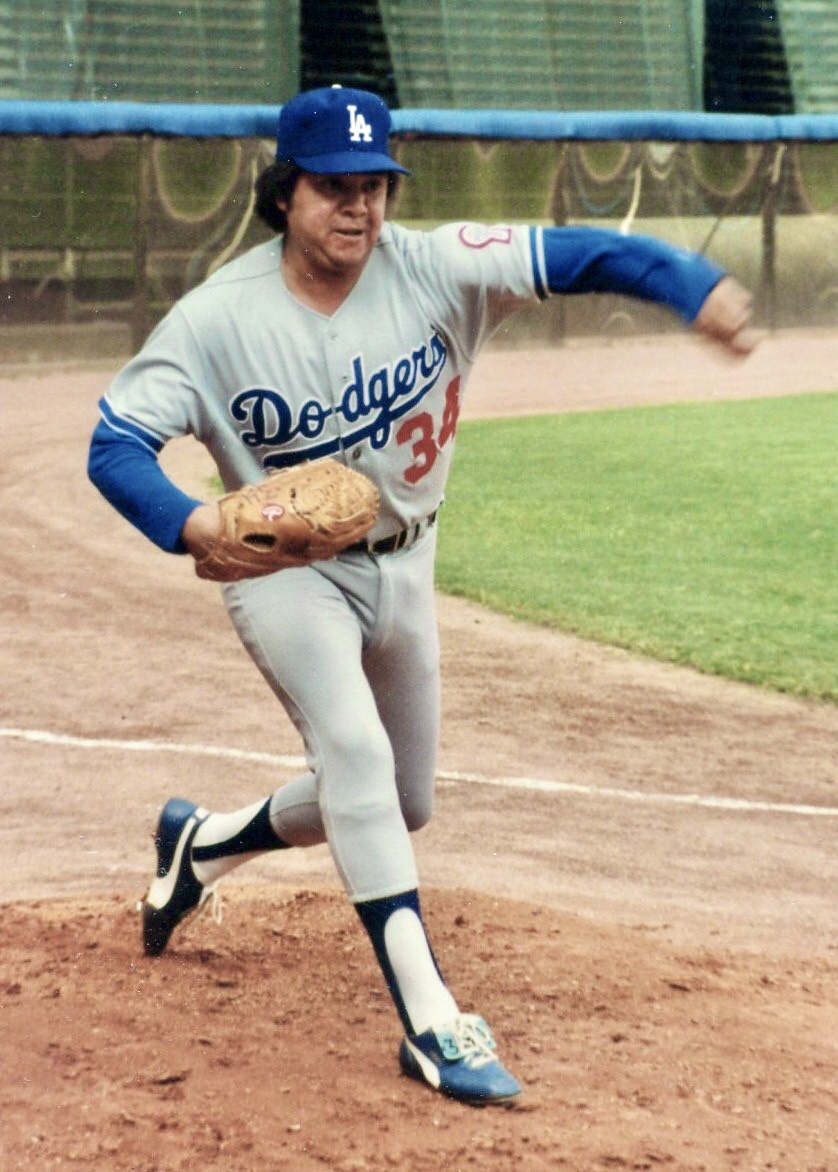
Fernando Valenzuela in 1981

The Dodgers hosted the 1980 All-Star Game at Dodger Stadium for the first time. The Opening Day starting pitcher for 1981 was a 20-year-old rookie from Mexico: Fernando Valenzuela. Pressed into service due to an injury to Jerry Reuss, Valenzuela pitched a shutout that day, and proceeded to win his first 8 decisions through mid-May. The youthful left-hander, speaking only Spanish but sporting a devastating screwball, became a sensation. "Fernandomania" gripped both Southern California, where huge crowds turned out to see him pitch, as well as in his home country of Mexico, where the number of radio stations that carried Dodger games increased that year from three stations to 17. Valenzuela became the only pitcher to be named Rookie of the Year and win the Cy Young Award in the same season. The Dodgers' successful start assured them of a playoff berth in the strike-shortened split season. After defeating the Montreal Expos with the help of a ninth-inning two-out home run by Rick Monday in the fifth and deciding game of the National League Championship Series they proceeded to defeat the Yankees in the World Series in six games, with the World Series MVP award split three ways among Ron Cey, Pedro Guerrero and Steve Yeager.

The Dodgers won NL West titles in 1983 and 1985, but lost in the NLCS both those years (to the Phillies and Cardinals, respectively). The 1985 NLCS was particularly memorable for Game 6, in which the Dodgers were protecting a 5–4 lead in the ninth inning, hoping to force a deciding seventh game. With two runners on and first base open, Lasorda elected not to walk Cards slugger Jack Clark, who proceeded to hit a home run off Tom Niedenfuer and send St. Louis to the World Series.

After seven years of high strikeout totals, and a 21-win season in 1986, Valenzuela sat out for most of the 1988 season. Plagued by arm troubles that were widely blamed on his being overused by Lasorda, his effectiveness faded before he turned 30. The new anchor of the pitching staff was a right-hander named Orel Hershiser. He had been given the nickname "Bulldog" by Lasorda, more as a hopeful motivational tool than an objective description of his personality, but by 1988 he had matured into one of baseball's most effective pitchers. That year he won 23 games and the Cy Young Award, and broke Don Drysdale's major league record by tossing 59 consecutive scoreless innings, ending with a 10-inning shutout on his final start of the season.

==== 1988 World Series Championship team ====
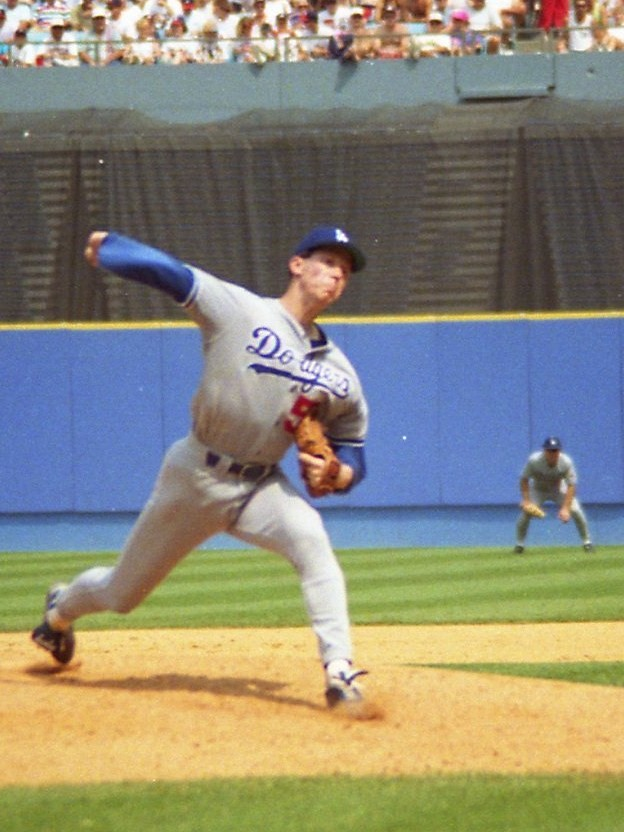
Orel Hershiser won the Cy Young Award in 1988 and was the World Series MVP.

The 1988 Championship won by the Dodgers is notable for the fact that the Dodgers were not expected to compete that season. The team had a roster of strong players, and were inspired by the newcomer Kirk Gibson (the league's Most Valuable Player that year), as well as the quiet but steady Hershiser and the always ebullient Lasorda. Although they entered the NLCS as decided underdogs to the powerful New York Mets, against whom they were 1–10 during the regular season, the Dodgers prevailed in a back-and-forth series that went all seven games and saw Hershiser come on for the save in game 4 (preceded by a dramatic 9th-inning home run by Mike Scioscia off Dwight Gooden). The World Series matched them with an even more powerful opponent, the Oakland Athletics, who owned baseball's best regular-season record with 104 wins against only 58 defeats. Featuring the "Bash Brothers" duo of Mark McGwire and José Canseco, the A's took an early lead in Game 1 on a grand slam by Canseco, and led 4–3 going into the bottom of the ninth inning. With two outs, pinch-hitter Mike Davis drew a base on balls from formidable closer Dennis Eckersley. During Davis' at-bat, Lasorda had the light-hitting infielder Dave Anderson on deck so the Athletics would pitch to Davis more carefully. Then, Gibson, affected by injuries to both his legs that included a strained MCL and a severely pulled hamstring, came in to pinch hit. After fighting off several pitches and working the count full, Gibson connected with a backdoor slider and hit it into the right field pavilion for a two-run, walk-off home run, winning the game for the Dodgers, 5–4. Widely considered one of the most memorable and improbable home runs in baseball history, Gibson's dramatic home run was his only appearance of the entire series, and it set the momentum for the following four games. Hershiser outperformed the Athletics in Games 2 and 5, and was on the mound when the Dodgers completed their 4 games to 1 upset of the A's, capping off an incredible personal season by being named the Series MVP. They won the Series in Game 5 with lifetime reserves Danny Heep and Mickey Hatcher in the starting lineup.

=== 1990s: Rookies, end of the Lasorda era and the new ownership ===
The "Think Blue" sign, modeled after the famous Hollywood Sign, has evolved into one of the team's slogans.

After 1988, the Dodgers did not win another postseason game until 2004, though they did reach the playoffs in 1995 and 1996. They narrowly missed the playoffs in 1991 and 1997, and led the NL West when the end of the 1994 season was cancelled by a strike. Hershiser, like Valenzuela before him, suffered an arm injury in 1990, and he never regained the performance he had earlier in his career. From 1992 to 1996, a record five consecutive Dodgers were named Rookie of the Year: Eric Karros, Mike Piazza, Raúl Mondesí, Hideo Nomo, and Todd Hollandsworth. After nearly 20 years at the helm, Lasorda retired as manager in 1996, remaining with the Dodgers as an executive vice-president. He was replaced as manager by longtime Dodgers shortstop Bill Russell.

Nearly a half-century of unusual stability (only two managers 1954–1996, owned by a single family 1950–1998) finally came to an end. After Los Angeles city officials rejected a proposal to bring an NFL stadium and franchise to Chavez Ravine in 1998, the O'Malley family sold the Dodgers to Rupert Murdoch's News Corporation, owner of the Fox network (which also owns broadcast rights to MLB games) and 20th Century Fox. Among the new ownership's early moves were trading away popular catcher Piazza and replacing Russell with veteran manager Davey Johnson. Johnson's volatile tenure ended two years later, and he was followed as manager by Jim Tracy. Fox made the first changes to the home uniform since the club moved from Brooklyn and introduced the team's first alternate jersey and cap, adding silver to the team's official colors (although they have rarely been used since). The team became more steady on the field in the early 2000s, with four consecutive winning seasons under the leadership of manager Tracy, starting pitchers Chan Ho Park, Odalis Pérez and Kevin Brown, sluggers Gary Sheffield and Shawn Green, outfielder Dave Roberts, shortstop Alex Cora, third baseman Adrián Beltré, and catcher Paul Lo Duca. The 2002 season was marked by the emergence of Éric Gagné as one of baseball's top relief pitchers. Gagné later won the Cy Young Award in 2003, converting all 55 of his save opportunities that year, and holding the league to a 1.20 ERA and striking out 137 batters in 82 1/3 innings. Gagné would later establish a new major league record for consecutive saves, with 84 saves spanning parts of the 2002, 2003 and 2004 seasons.

=== The McCourts and the sabermetric experiment ===
In 2004, the Dodgers were returned to family ownership, as News Corporation sold the team to Boston real estate developer Frank McCourt. McCourt immediately hired Paul DePodesta as his new general manager, replacing Dan Evans. As an assistant general manager in Oakland under Billy Beane, DePodesta favored a highly statistical approach to evaluating prospects and potential free-agents. This sabermetric approach, widely publicized in the book Moneyball: The Art of Winning an Unfair Game by Michael Lewis, led many to believe that new owner McCourt was unwilling to pay for high priced talent, and would thus reduce the Dodgers to a status similar to small-market teams such as Oakland. With a team largely assembled by DePodesta's predecessors, and augmented by some acquisitions of his own, DePodesta saw the Dodgers near the top of the standings through much of 2004. In an effort to put the team over the top that year, DePodesta pulled off a number of mid-season trades, including sending away three key players (including popular team leader LoDuca), while obtaining several new players. The Dodgers did manage to win the NL West in 2004, but lost quickly in four games in the Division Series to the eventual National League champion St. Louis Cardinals.

During the winter of 2004–05, the team parted ways with several more longtime players, including Beltré and Green. Their replacements included starting pitcher Derek Lowe, outfielder J. D. Drew, and the run-producing, but aging second baseman Jeff Kent. DePodesta's radical overhaul did not bear fruit in 2005, as the Dodgers suffered from clubhouse strife and stifling injuries, finishing with their second-worst record in Los Angeles history. The club also faced an overwhelming number of injuries that quickly scuttled the team's hopes of repeating as division champions. Among them were Drew's broken wrist, All-Star shortstop César Izturis's injury that required Tommy John surgery, and closer Gagné's deteriorating elbow condition that would also require surgery and force him to miss much of the 2005 season. Manager Jim Tracy also parted ways with the team at the end of the 2005 season, citing irreconcilable differences with DePodesta. However, DePodesta himself was fired by McCourt less than a month later, with McCourt later citing DePodesta's lack of leadership and dissatisfaction over DePodesta's handling of the process of hiring a new manager. Ned Colletti was hired as the new Dodger GM on November 16, 2005.

=== Colletti and Little ===
Newly hired Colletti was responsible for a tangible change in attitude and guided the Dodgers' resurgence in the 2006 season. He hired former Red Sox manager Grady Little to lead the team and also traded oft-troubled Milton Bradley for Oakland Athletics prospect Andre Ethier. His off season acquisitions also included former Atlanta Braves shortstop Rafael Furcal and former Red Sox third baseman Bill Mueller. Coletti also signed former All-Star shortstop Nomar Garciaparra, even though the team already had two other former All-Star shortstops (Furcal and the then-injured César Izturis). Garciaparra agreed to play first base and adjusted quite well in the field and remained productive at the plate, producing several key hits in Dodger victories.

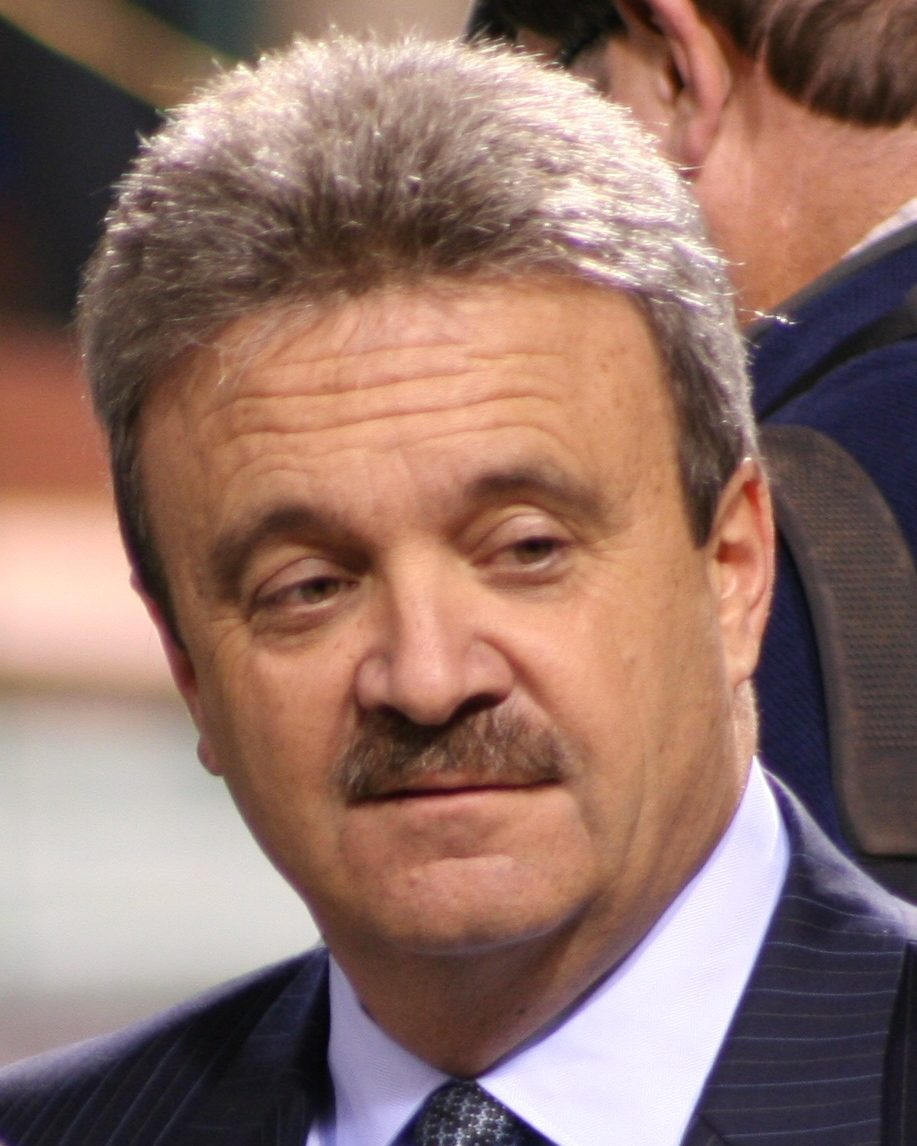
New Dodger general manager Ned Colletti

Due to the crowded infield, key injuries, and several players' lack of production, the team was rebuilt during the season. The flurry of trading saw César Izturis go to the Chicago Cubs for all-star Greg Maddux while Willy Aybar and Danys Báez went to Atlanta for Wilson Betemit. The Dodgers also signed Kenny Lofton during dree agency. A series of rookies were called up and provided substantial everyday contributions. Among them were catcher Russell Martin, who won the starting catching job after being called up in May and starting pitcher Chad Billingsley, who had several quality starts in August and September. Andre Ethier led the team in batting with a .308 batting average as the team's everyday left fielder through much of the season. Rookie first baseman James Loney hit very well in his short time with the team, tying Gil Hodges’ 56-year-old Dodgers record with 9 RBI in one game on September 28. Another key move was handing the closer's role to MLB rookie (but Japanese League veteran) Takashi Saito, where he flourished, notching 24 saves in 26 opportunities while posting a 2.07 ERA.

After a heated pennant race, in which the most memorable moment occurred when the Dodgers hit four consecutive home runs on September 18 to tie the score in the ninth inning and then won the game on a tenth-inning walk-off homer by Nomar Garciaparra, the Dodgers entered the 2006 playoffs in the National League's Wild Card spot, having tied the San Diego Padres for the division lead but having lost 13 of 18 head-to-head meetings with the Padres. They were eventually swept, 3–0, by the New York Mets in the 2006 National League Division Series.

In 2007, the Los Angeles Dodgers sent three players (Brad Penny, Takashi Saito, and Russell Martin) to the all-star game, and at one point, the Dodgers had a record of 54–41, which was then the best record in the National League. After a hitting slump, the Dodgers fell to 60–59, and seven games out of first place in the N.L. West. The Dodgers were able to rebound, however, and had a 79–69 record with three weeks left in the season. At this point, the Dodgers trailed the San Diego Padres by 1 1/2 games in the wild card slot, and the Arizona Diamondbacks by 3 1/2 games. However, the Dodgers lost 10 of their next 11 games, which eliminated the Dodgers from post season play, and would finish the season with a disappointing 82–80 record. The last few weeks of the season were disrupted further by public complaints in the media by some of the veteran ballplayers about the lack of respect afforded them by some of the younger players on the team. This led to a divided clubhouse, as younger players consistently got more playing time at the expense of the veterans. After the season and weeks of media speculation, Grady Little resigned as manager, citing personal reasons . A few days later the Dodgers announced the hiring of former New York Yankees skipper Joe Torre to be the team's new manager.

=== Struggles and "Mannywood" Ramirez ===
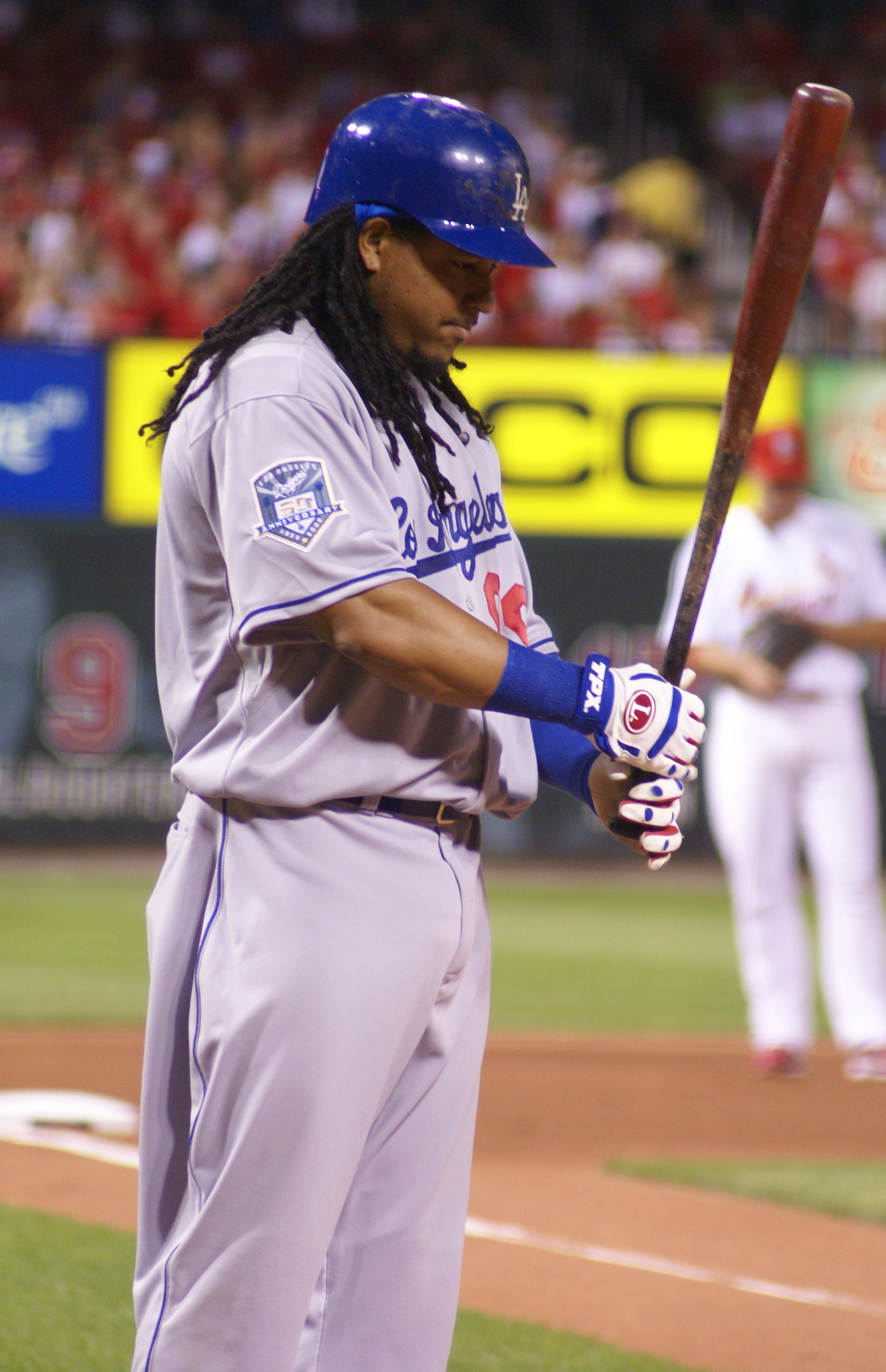
Ramirez in 2008, during his tenure with the Dodgers

At the start of the 2008 season, Joe Torre found himself with a whole new team, including new players Andruw Jones and Japanese pitcher Hiroki Kuroda. To add to his troubles, Don Mattingly was unable to perform his hitting coach duties, and third basemen Nomar Garciaparra and Andy LaRoche were out with injuries, leaving the starting third base position to rookie Blake DeWitt, who had never played above level A ball in the minor leagues. DeWitt stepped up early, when Nomar went down again with a calf injury. The team suffered a serious blow when star player Rafael Furcal was injured in the midst of the best start of his career. Many substitutions were used, including rookies Chin-Lung Hu and Luis Maza, but could not duplicate Furcal's offense. Staff ace Brad Penny and slugger Jones began to underperform, leading to trips to the DL for both. Despite the problems with the roster, as well as their record, the Dodgers were only behind first-place Arizona by one game at the All-Star break. The season saw progress in the teams prospects, including a call-up for top prospect Clayton Kershaw, as well as comebacks from veteran pitchers, most notably Chan Ho Park. Chad Billingsley quickly grew to be the team's ace, being one of the leaders in strikeouts and ERA and being the first pitcher on the Dodgers to get double-digit wins. For the majority of the season, the club hovered around a .500 record. To bolster a lineup of mostly young players, Ned Colletti made trades for shortstop Ángel Berroa, third-baseman Casey Blake, and on July 31, 2008, the Los Angeles Dodgers acquired outfielder Manny Ramirez from the Boston Red Sox in a 3-way deal that sent third baseman Andy LaRoche and single-A prospect pitcher Bryan Morris to the Pittsburgh Pirates and all-star outfielder Jason Bay to the Red Sox. Ramirez brought an energy to the team that it had lacked previously and also energized the fanbase. After playing more than 140 games of catch-up, the Dodgers swept Arizona to take first place in the last series of the season for the two teams on September 7 after being 4 games behind the week before. The Dodgers clinched the 2008 National League Western Division title on September 25 as the Arizona Diamondbacks were eliminated by losing to the St. Louis Cardinals 12–3. On October 4, 2008, they beat the Cubs 3–0 to sweep the 2008 NLDS and moved on to the NLCS, where they faced the Philadelphia Phillies and were eliminated, losing the series in five games. In 2009, however, Manny was suspended for taking a performing-enhancing substance. Despite the 50-game suspension, the Dodgers repeated as National League West Champions and once again faced the Philadelphia Phillies in the National League Championship Series [NLCS] after sweeping [3–0] the St. Louis Cardinals in the National League Division Series [NLDS]. They once more lost to Philadelphia [1–4]. The following season, a procession of injuries caused the Dodgers to fall out of the race by late summer. Manny Ramirez was traded to the Chicago White Sox in August and in September Joe Torre announced his decision to retire as Dodgers manager, to be replaced by Don Mattingly.

=== Divorce, scandal, bankruptcy and the end of the McCourt era ===
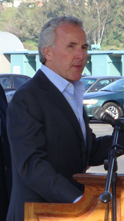
Frank McCourt

On October 14, 2009, it was announced the McCourts would be separating after nearly 30 years of marriage. While speculation was raised on the impact upon the McCourt family Dodger ownership, a spokesperson for Jamie McCourt said the following day that "the focus of the Dodgers is on the playoffs and the World Series". Jamie was fired from her position as Dodgers CEO on Thursday, October 22, 2009, the day after the Dodgers were eliminated from the playoffs, thus ending the reign of the self-proclaimed "First Female CEO of a Baseball Team". She officially filed for divorce shortly thereafter. Frank claimed that the divorce would have "no bearing on the team whatsoever". Despite that assertion, media speculation continued that the team was in financial difficulty.

On March 31, 2011, after the Opening Day game against the San Francisco Giants, a Giants fan was attacked by two men wearing Dodgers attire in the Dodger Stadium parking lot. He suffered serious injuries and was diagnosed with brain damage. In response, the Dodgers and Giants held a joint fundraiser to benefit the victim; a reward was offered for the capture of the attackers and security was beefed up at the stadium.

On April 20, Baseball commissioner Bud Selig announced that MLB would be appointing a representative to oversee the day-to-day operations of the Dodgers. His statement said that he took that action because of his "deep concerns for the finances and operations" of the Dodgers.

On June 27, one week after the commissioner refused to approve a proposed television contract that would have added much needed funding into the club, the Dodgers filed for Chapter 11 bankruptcy protection. After much legal wrangling between McCourts lawyers and MLB lawyers in bankruptcy court, he reached a deal with the league to put the team up for sale.

On March 27, 2012, it was announced that an agreement had been reached on the sale of the Dodgers between Frank McCourt and Guggenheim Baseball Management LLC, a group of investors fronted by Guggenheim CEO Mark Walter and including former Los Angeles Lakers player Magic Johnson, baseball executive Stan Kasten and film mogul Peter Guber. The total sale price for the Dodgers (which includes Dodger Stadium) exceeded $2 billion, making the sale the largest for a professional sports team in history, exceeding the approximately $1.5 billion purchase of Manchester United by Malcolm Glazer in 2005. On the same day, it was also announced that the members of the group will partner McCourt in purchasing the property surrounding the stadium. The sale price of the Dodgers was considered to be far higher than what the team was actually worth at the time of sale. Estimates made by Forbes placed the value of the Dodgers at approximately $1.4 billion, and the winning bid was more than 30% higher than the next highest bid. On April 13, the sale was approved by the bankruptcy court and it officially closed on May 1, 2012.

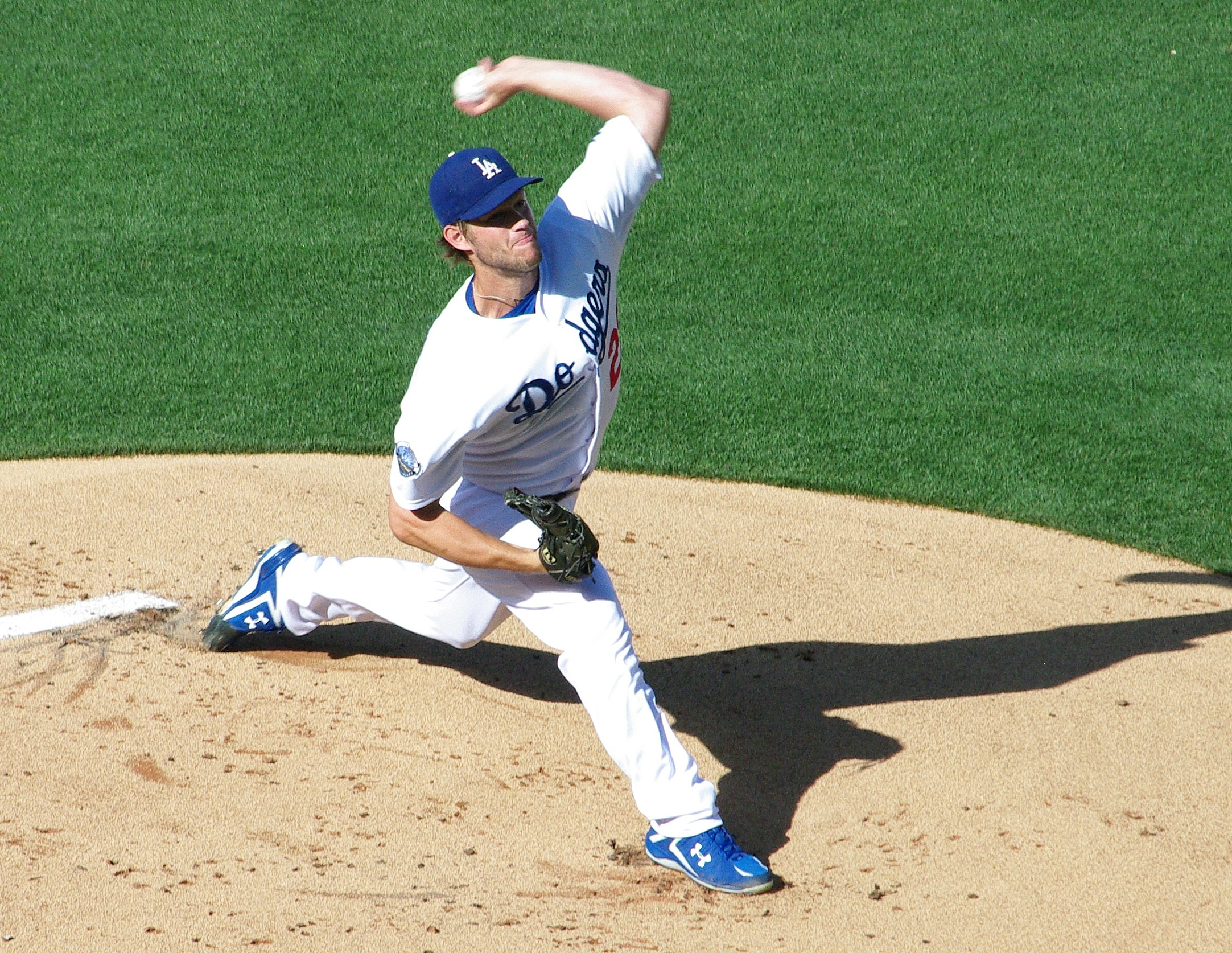
Pitcher Clayton Kershaw, who was considered one of the best players of his generation

On the field, the Dodgers would have a fall off from their 2008 and 2009 form and not make the playoffs in 2010 and 2011. However, the 2011 season featured two breakout performances; Matt Kemp hit .324, the highest batting average for a Dodger since Mike Piazza in 1997, to go along with 39 home runs, 40 stolen bases, and 126 runs batted in. For his effort, he finished 2nd in MVP voting, behind Ryan Braun. On the pitching side, Clayton Kershaw would also win his first of three Cy Young awards.

=== Guggenheim takes over and free spending ===
The Guggenheim group did not waste any time modifying the team's roster. In a departure from the McCourt years, the Dodgers started acquiring big contracts in trades. They traded for third baseman/shortstop Hanley Ramírez from the Miami Marlins, outfielder Shane Victorino from the Philadelphia Phillies and, in what was described as the "biggest August trade in MLB history" Adrián González, Josh Beckett and Carl Crawford from the Boston Red Sox. In their first season of ownership, the Dodgers new owners added $431 million in salary commitments. Despite the efforts, the Dodgers missed the playoffs for the third straight year.

In the offseason, the Dodgers went out and signed free agent starter Zack Greinke and Korean pitcher Hyun-jin Ryu to bolster their rotation. However, injuries to star players including Greinke, Ramírez and Matt Kemp got the team off to a slow start in 2013. On June 21, they were in last place in the division, 9 1/2 games behind the first place Arizona Diamondbacks. They turned things around in a hurry as players got healthy, made Kenley Jansen the closer, and Cuban defector Yasiel Puig joined the roster. The team went on a 46–10 run from June 22 through August 23 and moved past all the other teams in their division. On September 19 they clinched the division title, the earliest the team had ever clinched. The deficit they overcame was the largest in franchise history and they were just the fourth team in MLB history to win the division after being in last place on July 1. The team advanced to the 2013 National League Championship Series but lost in six games to the St. Louis Cardinals.

The 2014 season saw the emergence of Dee Gordon who took over the starting second base job and led the league in triples and stolen bases. Matt Kemp also returned to form after two seasons of batting injuries and Adrián González led the league in RBI. The pitching staff featured another dominant performance by Clayton Kershaw, who was 21–3 with a 1.77 ERA. He was the first pitcher in history to lead the league in ERA four straight seasons. Kershaw and Josh Beckett both pitched no-hitters during the season and the Dodgers had four pitchers (Kershaw, Greinke, Ryu and Dan Haren) all win 13 or more games. The Dodgers won their second straight NL West championship but lost again to the Cardinals in the Division Series. Kershaw would win the NL Cy Young Award and the NL MVP Award, making him the first National League player to win both awards in the same season since Bob Gibson in 1968.

In 2015, journalist Molly Knight published a book named Best Team Money Can Buy, chronicling the team's 2012, 2013, and 2014 seasons. The book goes inside-the-clubhouse story of tumultuous years when the team was re-made from top to bottom, becoming the most talked-about and colorful teams in baseball.

=== Roberts and Friedman era and return to the World Series ===
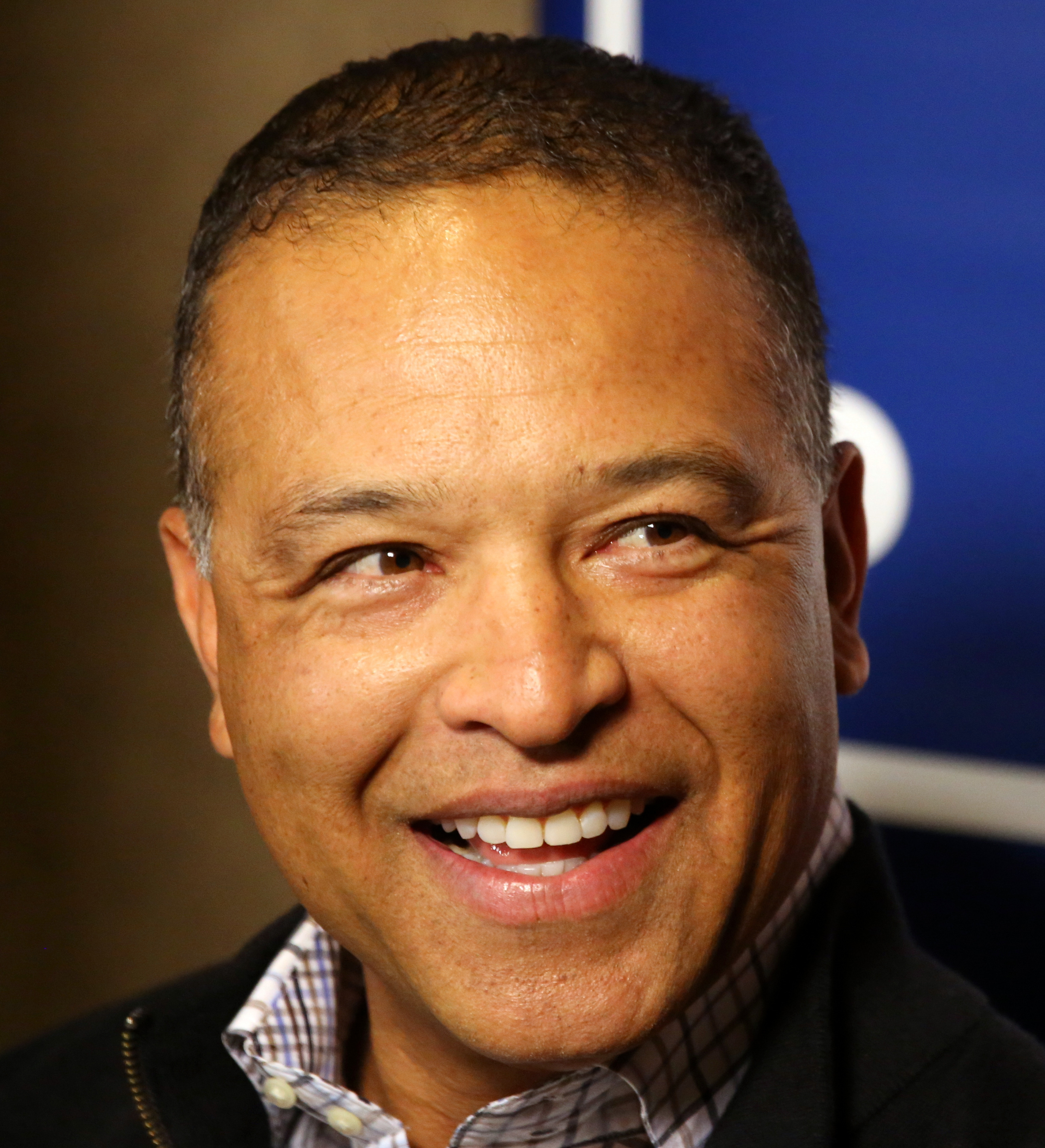
Roberts at the 2015 Winter Meetings

Following the disappointing end of the 2014 season, the Dodgers entered their 2015 season by replacing general manager Ned Colletti and hiring Andrew Friedman, (formerly of the Tampa Bay Rays) to the newly created post of "President of Baseball Operations" with a mandate to rebuild the farm system so that the team could build from within instead of continuing to pursue costly free agents. The new front office, which included hiring new general manager Farhan Zaidi, Farm Director Gabe Kapler, Vice President of Baseball Operations Josh Byrnes, Director of Player Personnel Galen Carr, and Director of Amateur Scouting Billy Gasparino made several trades that first off-season and drastically reshaped the roster and farm system. They traded away Matt Kemp, Dee Gordon, Dan Haren and others in moves that brought in established veterans like Howie Kendrick, Jimmy Rollins and young players with potential such as Alex Gurrero, Yasmani Grandal, Austin Barnes, Enrique Hernandez, and Alex Wood. At the minor league level, they put more emphasis on statcast data rather than traditional statistics, hired at least one Spanish-speaking coach to every minor league staff and introduced organic foods to players. The team battled injuries in 2015 that removed two members of the projected starting rotation to early season ending injuries and Puig also spent much of the season injured. Rookies Joc Pederson and Corey Seager came up and showed potential and Kershaw and Greinke remained the best one-two punch starting pitchers in the league. The Dodgers won their third straight NL West title for the first time in franchise history but again flamed out in the first round of the playoffs, losing to the Mets. Following the 2015 season, the club parted ways with manager Don Mattingly and Greinke exercised an opt-out clause in his contract, going on to sign with division rival Arizona. The club replaced Mattingly with San Diego coach and former Dodgers player Dave Roberts to be the team's new manager for the 2016 season and added former Toronto Blue Jays general manager Alex Anthopoulos to their front office. The team battled injuries in 2016, setting a new MLB record for the most players to spend time on the disabled list in one season. The team signed Japanese pitcher Kenta Maeda in the off-season and acquired Rich Hill at the trading deadline, helping them makeup for the loss of Kershaw for two months with a back injury. They won the NL West for the fourth straight season and defeated the Washington Nationals in the Division Series before losing in the NLCS to the eventual World Series champion Cubs. Corey Seager won the National League Rookie of The Year award.

==== 2017–2018: Back-to-back World Series defeats ====
Following the 2016 season, the Dodgers re-signed free agents Justin Turner, Kenley Jansen, and Rich Hill. During the season, the Dodgers received surprise performances from utility man Chris Taylor and relief pitcher Brandon Morrow and rookie first baseman/outfielder Cody Bellinger, all three whom started the season in the minor leagues. At the trade deadline, they traded for established ace Yu Darvish and also added left-handed relievers Tony Watson and Tony Cingrani. The team raced off to a 91–36 record through August 25, where many wondered if this was one of the best teams in MLB history. However, a late season slump, in which the team lost 20 of 25 games (highlighted by 11 straight losses), led to questions about whether the Dodgers would succeed in the postseason. Despite the slump, the team recovered to win eight of its final ten regular season games, securing their fifth consecutive National League West title and home field advantage throughout the MLB playoffs. Bellinger would be honored as the National League's Rookie of the Year for 2017, marking the third time the Dodgers had their players take home back-to-back Rookie of the Year honors in their history.

In the postseason, the Dodgers swept the Arizona Diamondbacks in the National League Division Series and defeated the defending World Series champion Chicago Cubs in the National League Championship Series in five games to advance to the World Series against the Houston Astros. The Dodgers lost the series in seven games. In January 2020, MLB confirmed that the Astros engaged in an elaborate and illegal sign stealing system during the 2017 regular season and postseason, during which they beat the Dodgers in the World Series.

Despite a 16–26 start to the season, which saw the team lose shortstop Corey Seager for the year, the 2018 Dodgers made the playoffs for the 6th straight year; winning the division in a Game 163 over the Rockies. Like the 2017 team, the 2018 version saw the Dodgers receive surprise contributions from unlikely sources. Max Muncy, who signed as a minor league free agent in the middle of the 2017 season and who was not on the opening day roster, ended up hitting a team leading 35 home runs between playing time at 1st, 2nd, and 3rd. Matt Kemp, traded back to the Dodgers in the off-season in part of a salary dump, led the team in RBIs and batting average. Rookie starting pitcher Walker Buehler, who was also not on the opening day roster, helped solidify the rotation by posting a 2.62 ERA in 24 appearances (23 starts). He, along with three other pitchers, threw a combined no-hitter on May 5 against the San Diego Padres. At the July trade deadline, the team traded for All-Star shortstop/third baseman Manny Machado and a former All-Star second baseman Brian Dozier. In August, former World Series MVP David Freese was brought in from Pittsburgh to strength an already formidable line-up. For the 2nd year in a row, the team broke the record for most home runs in a season by a Dodger team. With a 92–71 record, the team entered the playoffs as a second seed and went on to beat the Atlanta Braves, led by former Dodgers executive Alex Anthopoulos, in four games in the NLDS and the Milwaukee Brewers in a hard-fought seven games in the NLCS. The Dodgers were the first team in either league to win Game 7 of an LCS on the road since the 2006 Cardinals. The Dodgers again came up short in the World Series, this time losing to the Boston Red Sox in five games.

==== 2019: Dodgers set the franchise record for wins, upset by Washington ====
In the 2018–2019 off-season, the Dodgers lost general manager Farhan Zaidi, who took the president of baseball operations job for the San Francisco Giants, while third base coach Chris Woodward was hired to manage the Texas Rangers. This marked the second straight year Los Angeles lost a significant member of the front office and coaching staff. Jeff Kingston was hired from Seattle as Assistant GM to replace Zaidi. Long time fan favorite Yasiel Puig was traded along with Matt Kemp, Kyle Farmer, Alex Wood and Homer Bailey for prospects Jeter Downs and Josiah Gray, to open up playing time for younger players such as Alex Verdugo, Will Smith and Julio Urias, and also to reduce payroll to avoid MLB's competitive balance tax.

Following a July 3, 2019 walk-off home run from Cody Bellinger, the Dodgers set a franchise and major league record for most consecutive walk-offs with 5. A few weeks earlier, they also became the first team to have three consecutive walk-offs from rookies – Matt Beaty, Alex Verdugo and Will Smith. For the third straight year they broke the Dodgers record for home runs in a season. Additionally, on September 4, they broke the National League record for most home runs in a season with 250th homer (breaking the old mark set by the 2000 Houston Astros). For the second straight season, Los Angeles led the NL in runs scored and lowest runs allowed.

The Dodgers clinched the NL West for the 7th consecutive season on September 10 on the road against the Baltimore Orioles. It was the earliest the Dodgers had ever clinched a division in team history. They finished the regular season with a record of 106–56, breaking the franchise records for wins in a season, previously held by the 1953 Brooklyn Dodgers. However, they suffered an upset loss to the Washington Nationals in the 2019 NLDS. Cody Bellinger – with a .305/.406/.629 slashline and superb defense in centerfield and first base – was awarded the National League MVP.

==== 2020: Mookie Betts trade, COVID-19, 7th championship ====
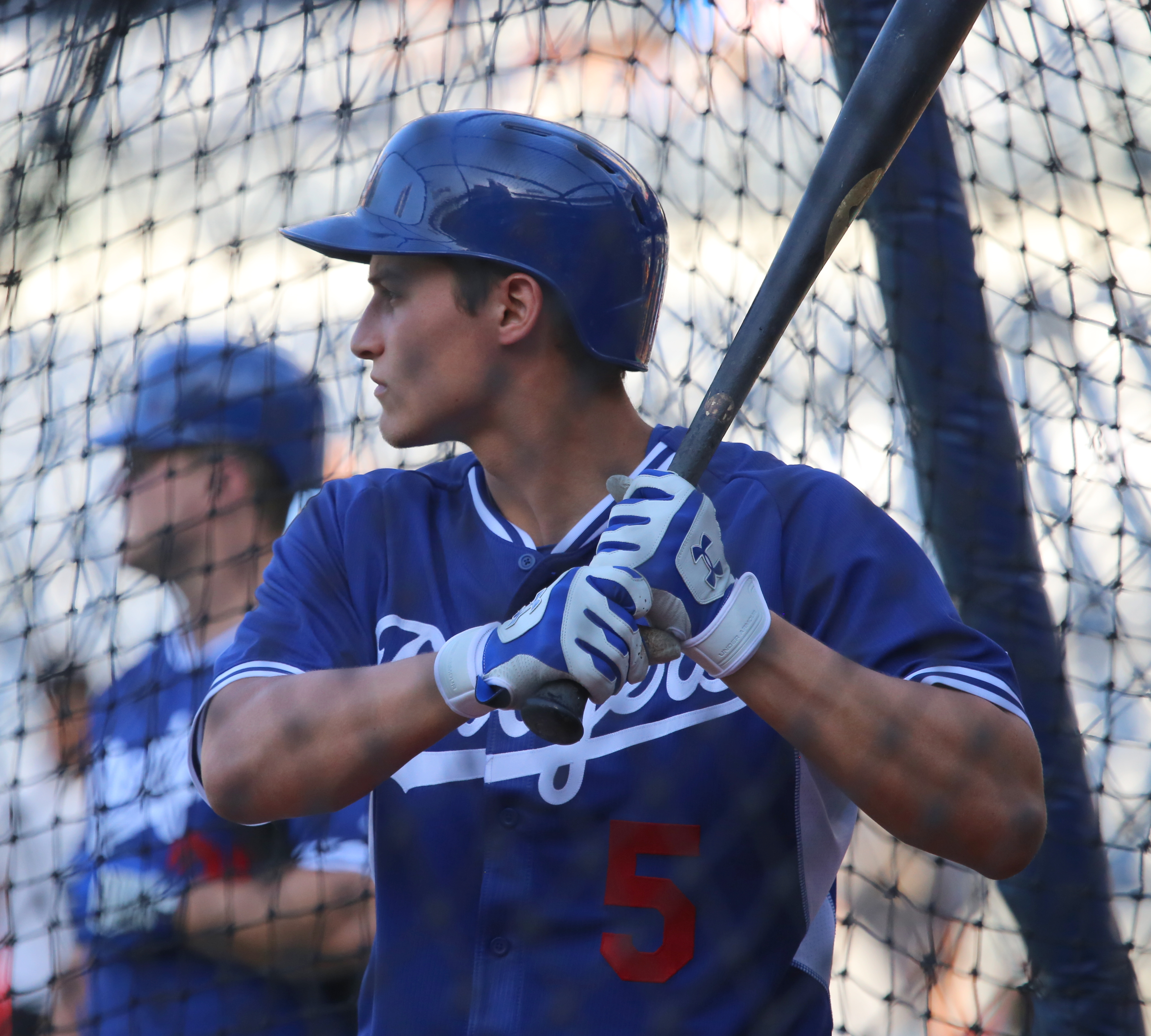
In 2020, Corey Seager was just the 8th player to win MVP of both the LCS and World Series in the same postseason.

On February 10, 2020, the Dodgers traded outfielder Alex Verdugo and minor leaguers Connor Wong and Jeter Downs to the Boston Red Sox in exchange for outfielder Mookie Betts, starting pitcher David Price and cash considerations. They also traded starting pitcher Kenta Maeda, minor leaguer Jaír Camargo and cash considerations to the Minnesota Twins for pitcher Brusdar Graterol, outfielder Luke Raley and the 67th pick in the 2020 Major League Baseball draft. On July 22, the Dodgers signed Mookie Betts to a 12-year contract extension, through the 2032 season. The deal was worth $365 million and also included a $65 million signing bonus, making it the richest contract in Dodgers history.

On March 12, 2020, MLB announced that because of the ongoing COVID-19 pandemic, the start of the regular season would be delayed by at least two weeks in addition to the remainder of spring training being cancelled. Four days later, it was announced that the start of the season would be pushed back indefinitely due to the recommendation made by the CDC to restrict events of more than 50 people for eight weeks. On June 23, commissioner Rob Manfred unilaterally implemented a 60-game season. Players reported to training camps on July 1 to resume spring training and prepare for a July 23 Opening Day. On July 4, newly acquired David Price announced he would opt out of playing in the 2020 season due to the pandemic.

The 2020 Dodgers started the season 30–10, matching the best 40-game start in franchise history. The last such Dodgers start came in 1977, along with the Brooklyn teams in 1888 and 1955. This was also the best 40-game start in the majors since the 116-win Mariners began 31–9 in 2001. The Dodgers finished the regular season 43–17 and won their 8th straight division title and swept both the Milwaukee Brewers in the 2020 National League Wild Card Series and the San Diego Padres in the 2020 National League Division Series. They then defeated the Atlanta Braves in the 2020 National League Championship Series, coming back from down 3 games to 1 to advance to the 2020 World Series against the Tampa Bay Rays, their third World Series appearance in the last four years and their 24th pennant in franchise history, surpassing the San Francisco Giants for the most in the National League. The Dodgers would then go on to defeat the Rays in six games, winning their first World Series since 1988, their sixth since moving to Los Angeles, and the seventh in franchise history.

==== 2021–2023: Early postseason exits ====
The Dodgers began the 2021 season on an extremely uplifting note, winning 13 of their first 15 games. However, the Dodgers then lost 14 of their next 18 games. Throughout the season, the team battled injuries to key players as Bellinger and Kershaw both missed extensive time on the injured list. Betts also had lingering issues with his back and shoulder all season, Dustin May missed the entire season with Tommy John Surgery, Corey Seager also missed a portion of the season due to a hand injury. Due to these woes (and a suspension to their big free agent pick-up, Trevor Bauer), the Dodgers traded for Max Scherzer and Trea Turner at the trade deadline for prospects. They also signed both future Hall of Fame hitter Albert Pujols after he was released from the Angels. The Dodgers won 106 games, tying a franchise record in wins, and finished just one game behind the Giants in the division, making their ninth straight playoff appearance. They beat the Giants in the 2021 National League Division Series but were defeated by the Atlanta Braves in the 2021 National League Championship Series.

In 2022, the Dodgers lost Corey Seager to free agency but replaced him by signing all-star first baseman Freddie Freeman to a six-year contract. The rotation lost Walker Buehler in mid-June to Tommy John surgery, but Julio Urías led the league in earned run average, Clayton Kershaw had a strong comeback season, and Tony Gonsolin and Tyler Anderson had breakout seasons. The Dodgers won 111 games, a new franchise record and the most in the National League since the 1906 Chicago Cubs, and finished 22 games ahead of the San Diego Padres in the division race. Despite that, they were upset by the Padres in the Division Series.

The Dodgers entered the 2023 season with the longest active playoff streak in major North American sports. They went 100–62 during the regular season, winning 100 games for the fourth time in a row for a full season, but lost to the Diamondbacks in the NLDS.

==== 2024–2025: Ohtani era, back-to-back championships ====
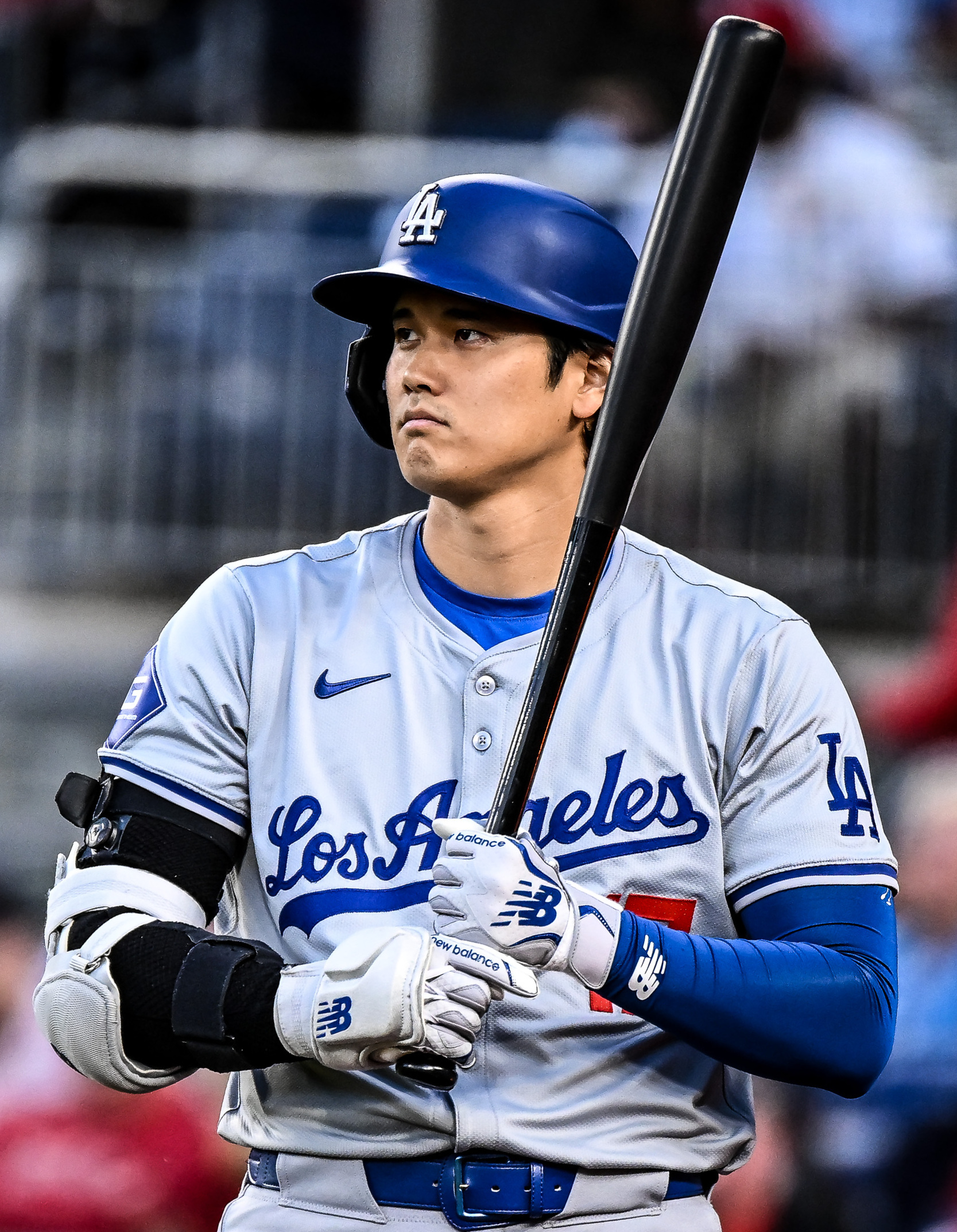
Shohei Ohtani became the first player to hit 50 home runs and steal 50 bases in a single season.

In December 2023, the Dodgers signed free agent two-way player and two-time American League MVP Shohei Ohtani to a 10-year, $700 million deal, the largest deal in professional sports. Ohtani's record-breaking deal included structuring in such a way that $68 million per season was deferred until after the conclusion of the deal to be paid out from 2034 to 2043. That same month, the Dodgers signed Japanese pitcher Yoshinobu Yamamoto to a 12-year, $325 million contract, which included a $50.625 million posting fee to Yamamoto's previous team, the Orix Buffaloes. The team solidified the strong off-season by signing outfielder Teoscar Hernandez and trading for All-Star pitcher Tyler Glasnow.

In his first season, Ohtani became the first player in MLB history to break the 50 homerun, 50 stolen bases barrier in a single-season. He also surpassed Shawn Green's Dodgers single-season home run record with 54 home runs. He did not pitch due to an elbow injury suffered at the end of the 2023 season.

The Dodgers finished the 2024 season with a 98–64 record, the best in the majors, and home field advantage throughout the playoffs, although it was the first season they failed to win 100 games in a full season since 2018. For the third time in five years, they faced their division rival San Diego Padres in the 2024 National League Division Series, which they won the series in five games to advance to the 2024 National League Championship Series. They beat the New York Mets in six games to win their first NL pennant since 2020 and 25th overall. They faced the New York Yankees in the 2024 World Series, the twelfth meeting between the two clubs in the World Series and the first since 1981. The Dodgers won the series in five games, highlighted by Freddie Freeman hitting a walk-off grand slam in Game 1, the first in World Series history. The home run immediately brought comparisons to Kirk Gibson's walk-off home run in Game 1 of the 1988 World Series due to both players being injured at the time, both hitting their home run in nearly the exact same spot, and both came at 8:37 p.m. Pacific Time. Overall, it was Los Angeles' eighth World Series championship.

The Dodgers solidified their championship roster from the previous season by adding free agents starting pitcher Blake Snell, reliever Tanner Scott, and winning the bid to sign Japanese pitcher Roki Sasaki, while also re-signing Teoscar Hernández and Blake Treinen. As heavy favorites to repeat, the Dodgers became the first defending World Series champion to begin their season 8–0, besting the previous record held by the 1933 Yankees, who started their season 7–0. The Dodgers had a 56–32 record with a nine-game lead in the National League West on July 3. However, from July 4 through September 6, the Dodgers experienced their worst 54-game stretch (22–32) of Dave Roberts' tenure as team manager (2016–present), partly due to career-worst slumps from Mookie Betts and Freddie Freeman, and a unreliable bullpen. They rebounded towards the end of the season, winning five of their last six regular season series, posting a 93–69 record and winning the NL West division for the fourth consecutive season and the 12th time in the last 13 seasons (2013–2020, 2022–2025). In September, longtime Dodgers' ace pitcher Clayton Kershaw announced 2025 would be his last season.

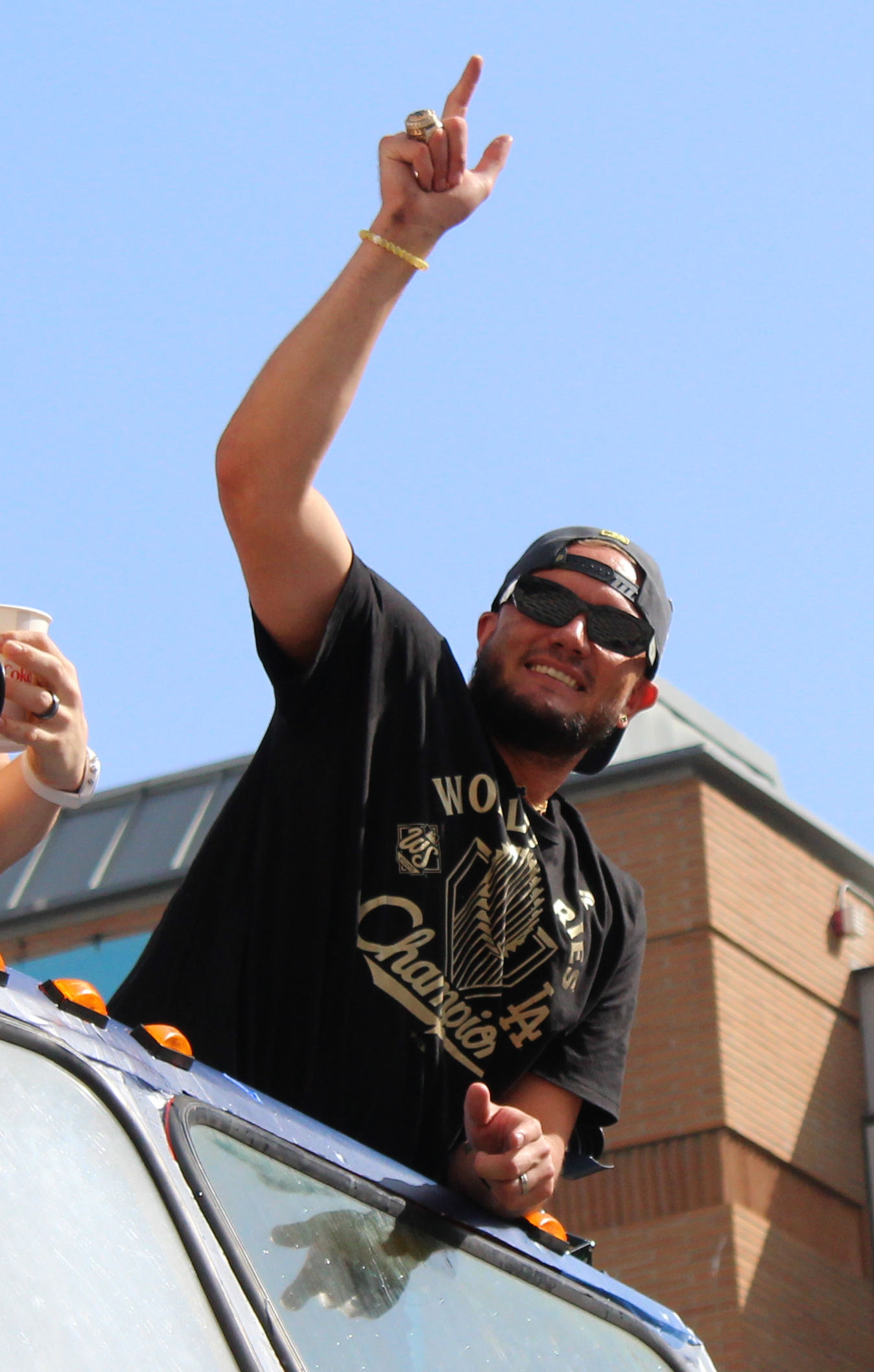
2025 World Series hero Miguel Rojas at the team's championship parade

As the third-best division winner by record, the Dodgers hosted and swept the sixth-seeded Cincinnati Reds in the Wild Card Series in two games. They then defeated the second-seeded Philadelphia Phillies in four games in the National League Division Series, highlighted by an errant throw by Orion Kerkering that gave the Dodgers the series walk-off win. In the National League Championship Series, they dispatched the postseason's overall top seed in the Milwaukee Brewers in a four-game sweep. They allowed just four runs in the series and it was their first sweep in a seven-game series since sweeping the New York Yankees in the 1963 World Series. Unlike the 2024 team, which was reliant on relief pitching, the 2025 Dodgers' team strength was their starting pitchers, due to the signing of Snell, a return to pitching from two-way superstar Ohtani, a healthy second half of the season from Tyler Glasnow (who was absent from the team's playoff run the previous year due to an elbow injury), and a full season of Yoshinobu Yamamoto. Throughout the postseason, the staff pitched into the sixth inning in every start but one and did not allow more than three earned runs. After hitting three home runs and pitching six shutout innings with ten strikeouts in the decisive Game 4 of the NLCS, Ohtani won the NLCS MVP Award.

The World Series proved to be a much tougher test, however. Their opponent, the Toronto Blue Jays, blitzed the Dodgers in the sixth inning of Game 1, scoring nine runs, the most runs in an inning in the World Series since 1968 when the Detroit Tigers put up 10 against the St. Louis Cardinals. In Game 2, the Dodgers tied the series thanks to a Yoshinobu Yamamoto complete game, which was his second consecutive complete game. Back at home, the Dodgers won Game 3 in 18 innings, capped off by a Freddie Freeman walk-off solo home run. Toronto took advantage of the Dodgers’ struggling bullpen in Games 4 and 5, with the Blue Jays threatening to take the series with a 3–2 series lead. However, the Dodgers prevailed in a low-scoring Game 6 to send the series into a winner-take-all Game 7. During the latter, Toronto held control for a majority of the game, but Dodgers Miguel Rojas hit a crucial game-tying home-run followed by a narrow defensive stop by the Dodgers in the ninth to send Game 7 into extra innings. In the 11th, the Dodgers would get a go-ahead home run by Will Smith, then Yoshinobo Yamamoto (pitching on zero day's rest after starting Game 6) withstood a late Blue Jays rally to end the game and the series. The Dodgers were the first repeat champion since the 2000 Yankees. They were also just the ninth team to win Game 6 and 7 of a World Series on the road.

== See also ==
- 1958 in baseball
