= Sam Kimber =

American baseball player (1854–1925)

- Pitcher
- Born: October 29, 1852; Philadelphia, Pennsylvania, U.S.
- Died: November 6, 1925 (aged 73); Philadelphia, Pennsylvania, U.S.
- Batted: Right Threw: Right

MLB debut
- May 1, 1884, for the Brooklyn Atlantics

Last MLB appearance
- September 29, 1885, for the Providence Grays

MLB statistics
- Win–loss record: 18–21
- Earned run average: 3.97
- Strikeouts: 126
- Stats at Baseball Reference

Teams
- Brooklyn Atlantics (1884); Providence Grays (1885)

Career highlights and awards
- Pitched a no-hitter on October 4, 1884

Samuel Jackson Kimber (October 29, 1852 – November 6, 1925) was an American Major League Baseball player who pitched one full season, for the 1884 Brooklyn Atlantics of the American Association, and one game for the 1885 Providence Grays of the National League.

Although his career was short, Sam did have one shining moment, on October 4, 1884, he pitched baseball's first extra-inning no-hitter. He pitched this game against the Toledo Blue Stockings, a game that lasted ten innings and ended in a scoreless tie, when it was called because of darkness.

Kimber died in his hometown of Philadelphia, he was interred at Westminster Cemetery in Bala Cynwyd, Pennsylvania.

== See also ==
- List of Major League Baseball no-hitters

Achievements
Preceded by none	Brooklyn Atlantics; Opening Day; Starting pitcher 1884	Succeeded by John Harkins
Preceded by Ed Cushman	No-hitter pitcher October 4, 1884	Succeeded by John Clarkson
