= Jack Corcoran =

American baseball player (1858–1935)

- Catcher
- Born: May 15, 1858; Lowell, Massachusetts, US
- Died: December 28, 1935 (aged 77); Jersey City, New Jersey, US
- Batted: Unknown Threw: Unknown

MLB debut
- May 1, 1884, for the Brooklyn Atlantics

Last MLB appearance
- October 13, 1884, for the Brooklyn Atlantics

MLB statistics
- Games: 52
- Batting average: .211
- Runs scored: 17
- Stats at Baseball Reference

Teams
- Brooklyn Atlantics (1884)

John H. Corcoran (May 15, 1858 – December 28, 1935), was an American catcher in Major League Baseball who played for the Brooklyn Atlantics during the 1884 season. This was his only season in the Majors. He did play professional baseball in various minor and independent leagues from 1882–1899.
