= Norton Braves =

- 1951–1953; Norton, Virginia

Minor league affiliations
- Class: Class D (1951–1953)
- League: Mountain States League (1951–1953)

Major league affiliations
- Team: None

Minor league titles
- League titles (0): None
- Wild card berths (0): None

Team data
- Name: Norton Braves (1951–1953)
- Ballpark: Municipal Stadium (1951–1953)

The Norton Braves were a minor league baseball team based in Norton, Virginia. From 1951 to 1953, the Braves played exclusively as members of the Class D level Mountain States League. Norton hosted home minor league games at Municipal Stadium.

== History ==
Minor league baseball began in Norton, Virginia when the 1951 Norton "Braves" began play as members of the eight–team, Class D level, Mountain States League. The Big Stone Gap Rebels, Harlan Smokies, Hazard Bombers, Jenkins Cavaliers, Middlesboro Athletics, Morristown Red Sox and Pennington Gap Miners joined the Braves in beginning league play on April 29, 1951.

The ballclub was owned by Norton Baseball Club Inc.

The 1951 Braves finished their first season of play with a 53–72 record, placing sixth in the regular season, playing under managers Bob Bowman, George Sifft and George Motto. Norton finished 39.5 games behind the first place Hazard Bombers in the regular season standings. The Braves scored 812 runs and allowed 1002 runs on the season. Sergio Aguilar had a .363 average and Jack Estes led Norton with 15 wins and a 5.08 ERA. After the 1951 season, both the Jenkins Cavaliers and Pennington Gap Miners franchises folded and the Mountain States League reduced to six teams in 1952.

The Norton Braves continued play in the 1952 Mountain States League. Norton ended the 1952 season with a record of 30–88, placing sixth and last in the Mountain States League. Norton finished 56.5 games behind the first place Hazard Bombers in the regular season standings. Under managers George Motto, William Fitchko and Mark Muslin, the Braves scored 572 runs and surrendered 964 runs. Billy Williams led the team with a .272 average, while James Smiley and Albert Orlando led Norton with 7 wins each and Albert Orlando had a 4.12 earned run average.

In their final season of play, the 1953 Norton Braves placed fifth in the standings. The Braves ended the Mountain States League regular season with a record of 63–63, playing the season under manager Walt Dixon. The Braves finished 16.0 games behind the first place Maryville-Alcoa Twins. Norton scored 899 runs and surrendered 944 runs, most in the league. Player/manager Walt Dixon led Norton hitters with a .415 average and led the league with both 37 home runs and 197 hits. Eric Doughtie led Norton with 17 wins, while Albert Turner recorded a 4.44 ERA. Norton did not qualify for the playoffs.

The Norton Braves franchise folded after the 1953 season. Norton, Virginia has not hosted another minor league team.

== The ballpark ==
The Norton Braves teams played home games at Municipal Stadium. In 1953, the Norton Baseball Club, Inc. leased Municipal Stadium from the City of Norton for a fee of $15.00 per game, with $5.00 of the amount applied to a delinquent $410.00 balance. The ballpark was lighted and has a seating capacity of 1,200. The ballpark no longer exists.

== Timeline ==
Year(s)	# Yrs.	Team	Level	League	Ballpark
1951–1953	3	Norton Braves	Class D	Mountain States League	Municipal Stadium

== Year–by–year records ==
Year	Record	Finish	Manager	Attendance	Playoffs/Notes
1951	53–72	6th	Bob Bowman; George Sifft / George Motto	12,314	Did not qualify
1952	30–88	6th	George Motto; William Fitchko / Mark Muslin	10,029	Did not qualify
1953	63–63	5th	Walt Dixon	21,873	Did not qualify

== Notable alumni ==
- Walt Dixon (1953, MGR)
- Billy Williams (1952–1953)

=== See also ===
Norton Braves players
