= List of Appalachian League champions =

The Appalachian League is a collegiate summer baseball league in the United States. From 1911 to 2020, it was part of affiliated Minor League Baseball. A league champion is determined at the end of each season. Champions have been determined by postseason playoffs or winning the regular season pennant. Currently, the two teams with the highest winning percentages in each of two divisions, East and West, are eligible for the postseason. These teams compete in a single championship game to determine a league champion.

== League champions ==
Championship series results and finalist information is listed when postseason play occurred. The lack of this information indicates the league champion via final standings in a season without playoffs. Lists are sortable.

Year	Champion	Games	Finalist
1911	Johnson City Soldiers	—	—
1912	Bristol Boosters	—	—
1913^{[a]}	Johnson City Soldiers	forfeit	Knoxville Reds
1914^{[b]}	Middlesboro Colonels; Morristown Jobbers	—	—
1915	Not in operation		
1916	Not in operation		
1917	Not in operation		
1918	Not in operation		
1919	Not in operation		
1920	Not in operation		
1921	Johnson City Soldiers	5—1	Greeneville Burley Cubs
1922	Bristol State Liners	—	—
1923	Knoxville Pioneers	—	—
1924	Knoxville Pioneers	4—3	Bristol State Liners
1925	Greeneville Burley Cubs	—	—
1926	Not in operation		
1927	Not in operation		
1928	Not in operation		
1929	Not in operation		
1930	Not in operation		
1931	Not in operation		
1932	Not in operation		
1933	Not in operation		
1934	Not in operation		
1935	Not in operation		
1936	Not in operation		
1937	Pennington Gap Lee Bears	3—2	Elizabethton Betsy Red Sox
1938	Greeneville Burley Cubs	3—1	Kingsport Cherokees
1939	Elizabethton Betsy Red Sox	3—1	Kingsport Cherokees
1940	Johnson City Cardinals	3—0	Elizabethton Betsy Red Sox
1941	Elizabethton Betsy Red Sox	3—0	Johnson City Cardinals
1942	Bristol Twins	2—0	Elizabethton Betsy Red Sox
1943	Erwin Aces	4—3	Bristol Twins
1944	Kingsport Cherokees	3—1	Bristol Twins
1945	Kingsport Cherokees	4—2	Bristol Twins
1946	New River Rebels	4—2	Elizabethton Betsy Cubs
1947	New River Rebels	4—2	Pulaski Counts
1948	Pulaski Counts	4—1	Bluefield Blue–Grays
1949	Bluefield Blue–Grays	3—0	Bristol Twins
1950	Bristol Twins	3—0	Bluefield Blue–Grays
1951	Kingsport Cherokees	3—2	Bluefield Blue–Grays
1952	Welch Miners	3—1	Pulaski Phillies
1953	Welch Miners	3—0	Johnson City Cardinals
1954	Bluefield Blue–Grays	3—0	Pulaski Phillies
1955^{[c]}	Johnson City Cardinals; Salem Rebels	2—2	Remaining games cancelled due to weather
1956	Not in operation		
1957	Bluefield Dodgers	—	—
1958	Johnson City Phillies	—	—
1959	Morristown Cubs	—	—
1960	Wytheville Senators	—	—
1961	Middlesboro Senators	—	—
1962	Bluefield Orioles	—	—
1963	Bluefield Orioles	—	—
1964	Johnson City Yankees	—	—
1965	Salem Pirates	—	—
1966	Marion Mets	—	—
1967	Bluefield Orioles	—	—
1968	Marion Mets	—	—
1969	Pulaski Phillies	—	—
1970	Bluefield Orioles	—	—
1971	Bluefield Orioles	—	—
1972	Bristol Tigers	—	—
1973	Kingsport Royals	—	—
1974	Bristol Tigers	—	—
1975	Johnson City Cardinals	—	—
1976	Johnson City Cardinals	—	—
1977	Kingsport Braves	—	—
1978	Elizabethton Twins	—	—
1979	Paintsville Yankees	—	—
1980	Paintsville Yankees	—	—
1981	Paintsville Yankees	—	—
1982	Bluefield Orioles	—	—
1983	Paintsville Brewers	—	—
1984	Elizabethton Twins	1–0	Pulaski Braves
1985	Bristol Tigers	—	—
1986	Pulaski Braves	2–1	Johnson City Cardinals
1987	Burlington Indians	2–0	Johnson City Cardinals
1988	Kingsport Mets	2–0	Burlington Indians
1989	Elizabethton Twins	2–0	Pulaski Braves
1990	Elizabethton Twins	—	—
1991	Pulaski Braves	2–0	Burlington Indians
1992	Bluefield Orioles	2–1	Elizabethton Twins
1993	Burlington Indians	2–0	Elizabethton Twins
1994	Princeton Reds	2–1	Johnson City Cardinals
1995	Kingsport Mets	2–1	Bluefield Orioles
1996	Bluefield Orioles	2–1	Kingsport Mets
1997	Bluefield Orioles	2–0	Pulaski Rangers
1998	Bristol White Sox	2–0	Princeton Devil Rays
1999	Martinsville Astros	2–0	Pulaski Rangers
2000	Elizabethton Twins	2–0	Danville Braves
2001	Bluefield Orioles	2–1	Elizabethton Twins
2002	Bristol White Sox	2–1	Bluefield Orioles
2003	Elizabethton Twins	2–1	Martinsville Astros
2004	Greeneville Astros	2–1	Danville Braves
2005	Elizabethton Twins	2–1	Danville Braves
2006	Danville Braves	2–1	Elizabethton Twins
2007	Elizabethton Twins	2–0	Danville Braves
2008	Elizabethton Twins	2–0	Pulaski Mariners
2009	Danville Braves	2–0	Elizabethton Twins
2010	Johnson City Cardinals	2–0	Elizabethton Twins
2011	Johnson City Cardinals	2–0	Bluefield Blue Jays
2012	Elizabethton Twins	2–1	Burlington Royals
2013	Pulaski Mariners	2–0	Greeneville Astros
2014	Johnson City Cardinals	2–1	Danville Braves
2015	Greeneville Astros	2–1	Princeton Rays
2016	Johnson City Cardinals	2–0	Burlington Royals
2017	Elizabethton Twins	2–0	Pulaski Yankees
2018	Elizabethton Twins	2–0	Princeton Rays
2019	Johnson City Cardinals	2–1	Burlington Royals
2020	None (season cancelled due to COVID-19 pandemic)		
2021	Greeneville Flyboys	1–0	Pulaski River Turtles
2022	Kingsport Axmen	1–0	Burlington Sock Puppets
2023	Johnson City Doughboys	1–0	Burlington Sock Puppets
2024	Danville Otterbots	1–0	Greeneville Flyboys
2025	Bluefield Ridge Runners	1–0	Kingsport Axmen
2026	Kingsport Axmen	1–0	Pulaski River Turtles

== Championship wins by team ==
Active Appalachian League teams appear in bold.

Wins	Team	Championship years
14	Bluefield Blue-Grays/Dodgers/Orioles	1949, 1950, 1954, 1957, 1962, 1963, 1967, 1970, 1971, 1982, 1992, 1996, 1997, 2001
12	Elizabethton Twins	1978, 1984, 1989, 1990, 2000, 2003, 2005, 2007, 2008, 2012, 2017, 2018
11	Johnson City Phillies/Yankees/Cardinals/Doughboys	1940, 1958, 1964, 1975, 1976, 2010, 2011, 2014, 2016, 2019, 2023
8	Kingsport Cherokees/Royals/Braves/Mets	1944, 1945, 1951, 1973, 1977, 1988, 1995
7	Bristol Tigers/White Sox	1972, 1974, 1985, 1942, 1943, 1998, 2002
6	Pulaski Counts/Phillies/Braves/Mariners/Yankees	1948, 1969, 1986, 1991, 2013, 2017
4	Paintsville Yankees/Brewers	1979, 1980, 1981, 1983
3	Johnson City Soldiers	1911, 1913, 1921
2	Burlington Indians	1987, 1993
2	Danville Braves	2006, 2009
2	Elizabethton Betsy Red Sox	1939, 1941
2	Greeneville Astros	2004, 2015
2	Greeneville Burley Cubs	1925, 1938
2	**Kingsport Axmen**	2022, 2026
2	Knoxville Pioneers	1923, 1924
2	Marion Mets	1966, 1968
2	New River Rebels	1946, 1947
2	Salem Pirates/Rebels	1955, 1965
2	Welch Miners	1952, 1953
1	**Bluefield Ridge Runners**	2025
1	Bristol Boosters	1912
1	Bristol State Liners	1922
1	**Danville Otterbots**	2024
1	**Greeneville Flyboys**	2021
1	Martinsville Astros	1999
1	Middlesboro Colonels	1914
1	Middlesboro Senators	1961
1	Morristown Cubs	1959
1	Morristown Jobbers	1914
1	Pennington Gap Lee Bears	1937
1	Princeton Reds (Princeton Rays)	1994
1	Wytheville Senators	1960

== Notes ==
- ^{a} Knoxville refused to play a game at Johnson City during the series. Series declared a forfeit
- ^{b} Middlesboro and Morristown were in first place when the league disbanded on June 17
- ^{c} Championship series was tied at 2 games each. The remaining games were cancelled due to weather. Johnson City and Salem were declared co-champions.
