= Big Stone Gap Rebels =

- 1949–1953; Big Stone Gap, Virginia

Minor league affiliations
- Class: Class D (1949–1953)
- League: Mountain States League (1949–1953)

Major league affiliations
- Team: New York Giants (1952)

Minor league titles
- League titles (0): None
- Wild card berths (2): 1950; 1952

Team data
- Name: Big Stone Gap Rebels (1949–1953)
- Ballpark: Bullitt Park (1949–1953)

The Big Stone Gap Rebels were a minor league baseball team based in Big Stone Gap, Virginia. From 1949 to 1953, the Rebels played exclusively as members of the Class D level Mountain States League, qualifying for the league playoffs in 1950 and 1952. The Big Stone Gap Rebels were a minor league affiliate of the New York Giants in 1952. Big Stone gap hosted home minor league games at Bullitt Park.

== History ==
Minor league baseball began in Big Stone Gap, Virginia when the 1949 Big Stone Gap Rebels began play as members of the Class D level Mountain States League. The Big Stone Gap Rebels and Middlesboro Athletics joined the 1949 Mountain States League to form an eight–team league. The holdover Harlan Smokies, Hazard Bombers, Jenkins Cavaliers, Morristown Red Sox, Newport Canners and Pennington Gap Miners franchises completed the eight–team league.

The 1949 Big Stone Gap Rebels began play as members of the Mountain States League and failed to qualify for the playoffs. Big Stone Gap ended the 1949 season with a record of 55–70, to place seventh in the regular season standings, as Rudy Parsons, Dale Markert and Fred Marsh served as manager. The Rebels finished 28.5 games behind the first place Harlan Smokies in the regular season standings.

In 1950, the Big Stone Gap Rebels qualified for the Mountain States League playoffs. Big Stone Gap ended the 1950 season with a record of 75–51, placing 3third in the regular season standings. Under manager Jack Rothrock, the Rebels finished 6.5 games behind the first place Harlan Smokies in the regular season standings. In the playoffs, the Harlan Smokies defeated the Big Stone Gap Rebels 3 games to 1. Michael Hudak of Big Stone Gap, led the league with a 21–3 pitching record.

The Big Stone Gap Rebels continued Mountain States League play in 1951 and missed the playoffs. Big Stone Gap ended the season with a record of 49–75, placing seventh. Ham Schulte and Lew Flick served as managers as the Rebels finished 43.0 games behind the first place Hazard Bombers in the regular season standings. After the 1951 season, both the Jenkins Cavaliers and Pennington Gap franchises folded and the Mountain States League reduced to six teams in 1952.

The 1952 Big Stone Gap Rebels became a minor league affiliate of the New York Giants. The Rebels ended the Mountain States League in fourth place and qualified for the playoffs. With a record of 57–60 under manager Leonard Cross, Stone Gap finished 29.0 games behind the first place Hazard Smokies in the six–team league regular season standings. In the playoffs, the Harlan Smokies defeated Big Stone Gap 3 games to 2. Len Cross of Big Stone Gap led the Mountain States with 40 home runs and 125 RBI.

In their final season of play, the Big Stone Gap Rebels did not qualify for the Mountain States League playoffs. The Rebels ended their final season with a record of 55–70, placing sixth in the eight–team league under manager Kelly Lunn. Big Stone Gap finished 23.5 games behind the first place Maryville-Alcoa Twins in the final standings.

The Big Stone Gap Rebels folded from the Mountain States League after the 1953 season. Big Stone Gap, Virginia has not hosted another minor league team.

== The ballpark ==
The Big Stone Rebels hosted minor league home games at Bullitt Park. Today, Bullitt Park is still in use as a public park containing athletic facilities. The park is located at 217 East 1st Street North in Big Stone Gap, Virginia.

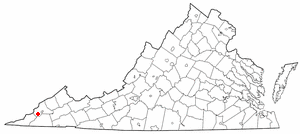
Virginia Map - Big Stone Gap, Virginia location

== Timeline ==
Year(s)	# Yrs.	Team	Level	League	Affiliate	Ballpark
1949–1951	3	Big Stone Gap Rebels	Class D	Mountain States League	None	Bullitt Park
1952	1	Big Stone Gap Rebels	Class D	Mountain States League	New York Giants	Bullitt Park
1953	1	Big Stone Gap Rebels	Class D	Mountain States League	None	Bullitt Park

== Year–by–year records ==
Year	Record	Finish	Manager	Attendance	Playoffs/Notes
1949	55–70	7th	Rudy Parsons / Dale Markert / Fred Marsh	37,751	Did not qualify
1950	75–51	3rd	Jack Rothrock	38,878	Lost in 1st round
1951	49–79	7th	Ham Schulte / Lew Flick	13,737	Did not qualify
1952	57–60	4th	Leonard Cross	11,161	Lost 1st round
1953	55–70	6th	Kelly Lunn	8,230	Did not qualify

== Notable alumni ==
- Bob Bowman (1950)
- Lew Flick (1950), (1951, MGR)
- Ham Schulte (1951, MGR)
- Joe Shipley (1953)

=== See also ===
Big Stone Gap Rebels players
