= Middlesboro, Kentucky minor league baseball history =

Middlesboro, Kentucky minor league baseball teams
- 1913–1963; (1913–1914, 1949–1954, 1961–1963); Middlesboro, Kentucky

Minor league affiliations
- Class: Class C (1954); Class D (1913–1914, 1959–1953, 1961–1962); Rookie (1963)
- League: Appalachian League (1913–1914); Mountain States League (1949–1954); Appalachian League (1961–1963)

Major league affiliations
- Team: Washington Senators (1961–1962); Chicago Cubs & Chicago White Sox (1963)

Minor league titles
- League titles (3): 1914; 1954; 1961
- Wild card berths (2): 1949; 1950

Team data
- Name: Middlesboro Colonels (1913–1914); Middlesboro Athletics (1949–1954); Middlesboro Senators (1961–1962); Middlesboro Cubsox (1963)
- Ballpark: Hilltop Speedway Park (1949–1954, 1961–1963)

Minor league baseball teams with varying nicknames were based in Middlesboro, Kentucky in various seasons between 1913 and 1963. Middlesboro teams played as members of the Appalachian League in 1913 and 1914, the Mountain States League from 1949 to 1954 and Appalachian League from 1961 to 1963, winning league championships in 1914, 1954 and 1961. Middlesboro teams were a minor league affiliate of the Washington Senators from 1961 to 1962 and both the Chicago Cubs & Chicago White Sox in 1963. Beginning in 1949, Middlesboro hosted minor league home games at the Hilltop Speedway Park.

== History ==
Minor league baseball began in Middlesboro when the 1913 Middlesboro Colonels began play in the Class D level Appalachian League. The Colonels ended the season with a 30–71 record to finish in sixth place in the 1913 regular season standings. In 1914, the Colonels continued play and were in 1st place with a 15–13 record, when the team disbanded on June 17, 1914. The Morristown Jobbers disbanded at the same time, causing the entire Appalachian League to cease operations.

Minor league baseball returned to Middlesboro 35 years later, when the 1949 Middlesboro Athletics began play as members of the Class D level Mountain States League. The Athletics joined fellow 1949 league members, the Big Stone Gap Rebels, Harlan Smokies, Hazard Bombers, Jenkins Cavaliers, Morristown Red Sox, Newport Canners and Pennington Gap Miners. The 1949 Athletics ended the season with a 69–56 record, placing third in the standings and losing to Harlan in the playoffs. Middlesboro had home season attendance of 25,833 in 1949. The Athletics remained in the Mountain States League through 1954.

In 1954, the Athletics won a championship in a shortened season. On July 20, 1954, Middlesboro was in first place with a 48–34 record when the Mountain States League disbanded permanently. The league folded after the Morristown Red Sox franchise had disbanded on May 15, 1954, Maryville–Alcoa moved to Morristown on June 19, 1954, then disbanded on July 7, 1954, and the Lexington Colts disbanded on July 7, 1954, causing the league to disband. Middlesboro had home season attendance of 9,031, an average of 220 per game.

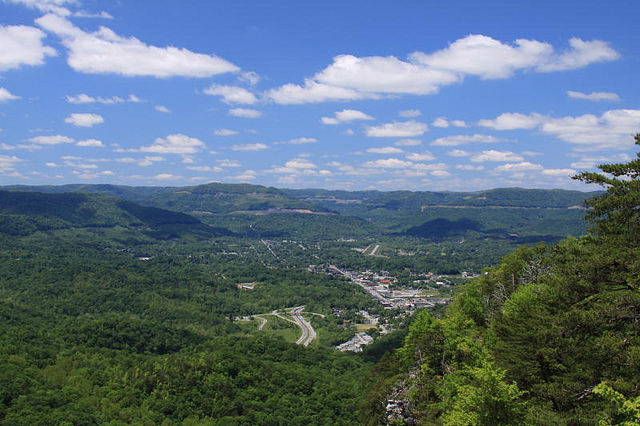
(2013) Pinnacle Overlook. Middlesboro, Kentucky

Middlesboro returned to the Appalachian League in 1961, with the Middlesboro Senators playing alongside the Bluefield Orioles, Harlan Smokies, Johnson City Cardinals, Kingsport Pirates, Morristown Cubs, Salem Rebels and Wytheville Twins in the eight–team league. In 1961, as an affiliate of the Washington Senators, the Senators captured the 1961 Appalachian League Championship with a 39–27 record. Middlesboro drew 16,751. In 1962, the Senators placed third with a 35–34 record.

In 1963, Middlesboro became an affiliate of both the Chicago Cubs and the Chicago White Sox, playing as the Middlesboro Cubsox. The Appalachian League became a Rookie level league. The Middlesboro Cubsox finished with a record of 31–57. After the season, Middlesboro and the Kingsport Pirates disbanded, leaving the league with four teams for the 1964 season.

Middlesboro has not hosted another minor league team.

== The ballpark ==
Beginning in 1949, Middlesboro teams hosted minor league home games at the Hilltop Speedway Park. The ballpark had a capacity of 2,500 and the facility was a racetrack that added the baseball park within its grounds. Hilltop Speedway Park hosted the Middlesboro Athletics (1949–1954), Middlesboro Senators (1961–1962) and Middlesboro Cubsox (1963) after the Hilltop Speedway Association built the baseball diamond and bleachers with lighting. The Speedway was located on 25-E Highway in Middlesboro, Kentucky.

== Timeline ==
Year(s)	# Yrs.	Team	Level	League	Affiliate	Ballpark
1913–1914	2	Middlesboro Colonials	Class D	Appalachian League	None	Unknown
1949–1953	5	Middlesboro Athletics	Class D	Mountain States League	None	Middlesboro Speedway Park
1954	1	Middlesboro Athletics	Class C	Mountain States League	None	Middlesboro Speedway Park
1961–1962	2	Middlesboro Senators	Class D	Appalachian League	Washington Senators	Middlesboro Speedway Park
1963	1	Middlesboro Cubsox	Rookie	Appalachian League	Chicago Cubs; Chicago White Sox	Middlesboro Speedway Park

== Year–by–year records ==
Year	Record	Finish	Manager	Playoffs/Notes
1913	30–71	4th	War Sanders	None
1914	15–13	1st (tie)	Lovell Draper	League disbanded June 17; League Co-Champions
1949	69-56	3rd	Hobe Brummitt / Ted Russ / James Burns	Lost in 1st round
1950	59–67	4th	James Burns	Lost in finals
1951	59–66	4th	Ted Russ / George Kennis	Lost in 1st round
1952	47–72	5th	Leon Culberson / Red Goff / Joe McManus	Did not qualify
1953	48–76	8th	Julian Morgan / Ben Pardue	Did not qualify
1954	48–34	1st	Walt Dixon	League disbanded July 20; League champions
1961	39–27	1st	Lewis Morton	League champions
1962	35–34	3rd	Lewis Morton	Did not qualify
1963	31–37	5th	Ripper Collins / Hugh Mulcahy / George Noga	Did not qualify

== Notable alumni ==
- Carl Bouldin (1961)
- Ed Brinkman (1961) MLB All-Star
- Jack Bruner (1954)
- Leon Culberson (1952)
- Walt Dixon (1954, MGR)
- Barry Moore (1962)
- Hugh Mulcahy (1963) MLB All-Star
- Roger Nelson (1963)
- War Sanders (1913)

== See also ==
- Middlesboro Athletics players
- Middlesboro Cubsox players
- Middlesboro Senators players
