= Jenkins Cavaliers =

- 1948–1951; Jenkins, Kentucky

Minor league affiliations
- Class: Class D (1948–1951)
- League: Mountain States League (1948–1951)

Major league affiliations
- Team: None

Minor league titles
- League titles (0): None
- Wild card berths (1): 1949

Team data
- Name: Jenkins Cavaliers (1948–1951)
- Ballpark: Jenkins Athletic Field (1948–1951)

The Jenkins Cavaliers were a minor league baseball team based in Jenkins, Kentucky. From 1948 to 1951, the Cavaliers played exclusively as members of the Class D level Mountain States League. Jenkins hosted home minor league games at the Jenkins Athletic Field.

== History ==
The 1948 Jenkins Cavaliers began minor league play as members of the Class D level Mountain States League. The "Cavaliers" was also the moniker of the local Jenkins High School and remains so today. The Cavaliers joined fellow league members, the Harlan Smokies, Hazard Bombers, Morristown Red Sox, Newport Canners and Pennington Gap Miners in the six–team league.

In their first season of play in 1948, the Jenkins Cavaliers finished with a record of 35–78 placing sixth and last in the league standings. Managed by Ray Russell, Jack Bell and Brenton Mays, Jenkins finished 33.5 games behind the first place Morristown Red Sox. The Cavaliers began play at Jenkins Athletic Field.

The 1949 Jenkins Cavaliers continued play as members of the Mountain States League and qualified for the playoffs. The Cavaliers finished in fourth place as the Big Stone Gap Rebels and Middlesboro Athletics joined the Mountain States League to form an eight–team league. The 1949 Jenkins Cavaliers finished with a 63–61 record under manager Joe Vitter, ending the regular 20.0 games behind the first place Harlan Smokies. In the playoffs, Jenkins lost in first round to the Morristown Red Sox 3 games to 2.

In 1950, the Jenkins Cavaliers finished with a 58–66 record placing fifth in the Mountain States League regular season standings. Playing the season under managers Bob Bowman, Wayne Stewart and Bill Scopetone, Jenkins finished 22.5 games behind the first place Harlan Smokies in the regular season standings.

Jenkins played their final season in 1951. The Cavaliers finished with a 24–101 record, placing a distant eighth in the regular season under managers James Grigg and Tom McBride. Finishing 68.5 games behind the Hazard Bombers in the regular season standings, the Cavaliers scored 571 runs while surrendering 1154 runs, last in both categories in the Mountain States League.

After the 1951 season, both the Jenkins and Pennington Gap franchises folded and the Mountain States League reduced to six teams in 1952. Jenkins has not hosted another minor league team.

== The ballpark ==
The Jenkins Cavaliers teams hosted home minor league games at Jenkins Athletic Field. Built in 1947, the ballpark had a capacity of 2,000 and was also used by Jenkins High School athletic teams. Jenkins Athletic Field was located on Main Street across from Jenkins High School in Jenkins, Kentucky.

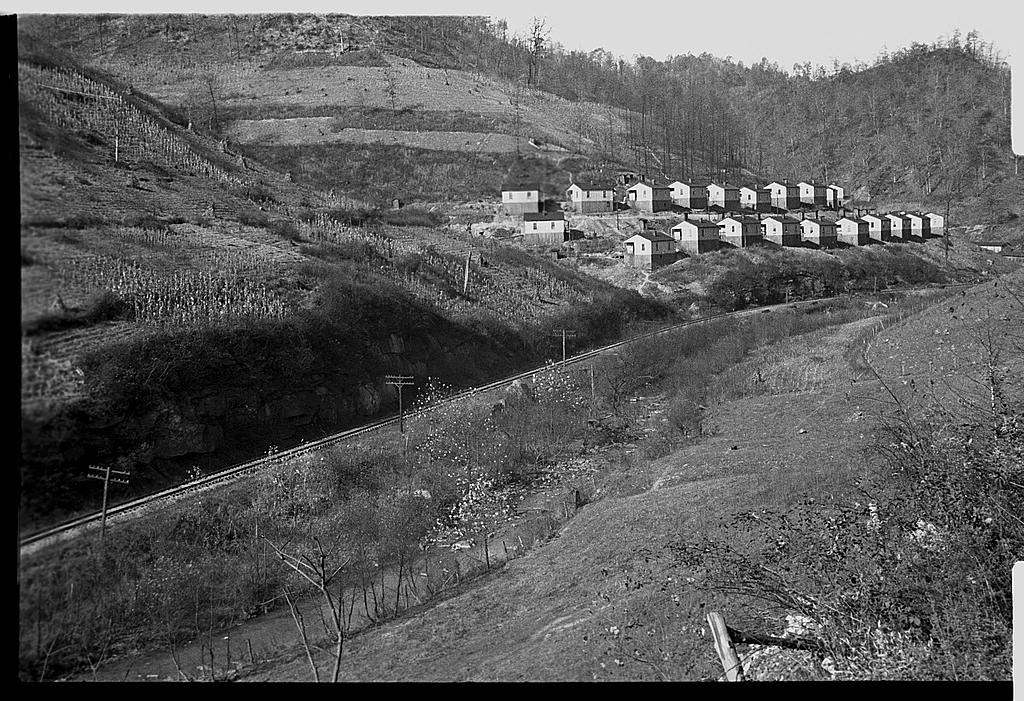
(1935) Jenkins, Kentucky

== Timeline ==
Year(s)	# Yrs.	Team	Level	League	Baseball
1948–1951	4	Jenkins Cavaliers	Class D	Mountain States League	Jenkins Athletic Field

== Year–by–year records ==
Year	Record	Finish	Manager	Attendance	Playoffs/Notes
1948	35–78	6th	Ray Russell / Jack Bell / Brenton Mays	23,276	Did not qualify
1949	63–61	3rd	Joe Vitter	19,654	Lost in 1st round
1950	58–66	5th	Bob Bowman / Wayne Stewart / Bill Scopetone	13,880	Did not qualify
1951	24–101	8th	James Grigg / Tom McBride	12,250	Did not qualify

== Notable alumni ==
- Bob Bowman (1950, MGR)
- Tom McBride (1950), (1951, MGR)
- Dom Zanni (1951)

== See also ==
Jenkins Cavaliers players
