= Erwin Mountaineers =

- 1940; Erwin, Tennessee

Minor league affiliations
- Class: Class D
- League: Appalachian League

Major league affiliations
- Team: Unaffiliated

Minor league titles
- League titles (0): None

Team data
- Name: Erwin Mountaineers
- Ballpark: Gentry Stadium

The Erwin Mountaineers were a Minor League Baseball team that played in the Class D Appalachian League in 1940. They were located in Erwin, Tennessee, and played their home games at Gentry Stadium.

The Mountaineers were managed by Tilly Walker, a former American League outfielder. Erwin was scheduled to open the season at home on May 2 against the Johnson City Cardinals, but the two-game series was postponed by cold weather. Consequently, they played their first game on May 4, defeating the Greeneville Burley Cubs, 8–5, on the road.

Walker stepped down as manager around the beginning of June, and third baseman James Hoff led the team as a player-manager on an interim basis for two weeks. On June 13, veteran Appalachian League skipper Bill Dubbs was brought in to manage the Mountaineers. Erwin ended the season on September 2 with a 6–2 road loss to the Pennington Gap Miners. They compiled a win–loss record of 27–88 (.235), placing last of eight teams, in their only season of competition.

The city of Erwin did not field another team until the Erwin Aces in 1943.
