= Morristown Red Sox =

- 1948–1954; Morristown, Tennessee

Minor league affiliations
- Class: Class C (1954); Class D (1948–1953)
- League: Mountain States League (1948–1954)

Major league affiliations
- Team: Unaffiliated (1948–1954)

Minor league titles
- League titles (1): 1948

Team data
- Name: Morristown Red Sox (1948–1954)
- Ballpark: Sherwood Park (1948–1954)

The Morristown Red Sox were a Minor League Baseball team that played in the Class D/Class C Mountain States League (MSL) from 1948 to 1954. They were located in Morristown, Tennessee, and played their home games at Sherwood Park. They won the inaugural MSL championship in 1948. Over seven years of competition, their all-time regular season win–loss record was 416–331 (.557).

== History ==
Professional baseball in Morristown, Tennessee, began in 1910 when the Morristown Jobbers became charter members of the Southeastern League. The Jobbers continued in the Appalachian League in 1911 and, with the exception of a brief absence in the first month of the 1913 campaign, played each season through 1914. From 1923 to 1925, the city's entry in the league was called the Morristown Roosters.

Twenty-three years later, the Morristown Red Sox became charter members of the Mountain States League (MSL). They opened the season at home with a 6–4 win over the Newport Canners on May 1 at Sherwood Park. The Red Sox completed their inaugural season with a league-best 70–46 (.603) record. They defeated Newport, 3–2, in the opening round of the playoffs to advance to the finals. There, Morristown won the first MSL championship over the Hazard Bombers, 3–2.

On June 17, 1949, Charles Coburn pitched seven-inning no-hitter in the first game of a doubleheader against the Pennington Gap Miners, an 8–0 road win. The team finished the season in second place, 11 games out of first, at 72–52 (.581). They opened the playoffs with a 3–2 semifinal win over the Jenkins Cavaliers, but were defeated in the finals by the first-place Harlan Smokies, 3–2. A sixth-place finish in 1950 at 56–67 (.455) kept the Red Sox from a return to the postseason.

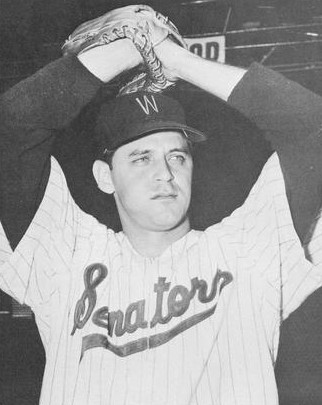
Pedro Ramos of the 1953 and 1954 teams went on to be selected as an MLB All-Star in 1959.

An improved 1951 season saw Morristown qualify for the playoffs with an 86–39 (.688) mark, 6 1/2 games behind the Hazard Bombers. They moved past the Middlesboro Athletics, 3–1, in the semifinals before being swept by Hazard in the championship finals, 3–0. Morristown again qualified for the postseason with a third-place 61–58 (.513) record in 1952. After defeating the Big Stone Gap Rebels, 3–2, in the semifinals, they were winless for the second-straight year in the finals, as they were bested by the Harlan Smokies, 3–0. The 1953 Red Sox finished fourth at 64–62 (.508), but were eliminated in the playoff semifinals by the Knoxville Smokies, 3–1.

On May 19, 1954, the Morristown Red Sox withdrew from the Mountain States League, citing high expenses and low revenues due in part to the league operating with seven teams instead of an even number. They lost their final two games, 11–8 and 2–1, played as a doubleheader against the Kingsport Cherokees on May 15 at home. Over seven seasons in the MSL, Morristown had accumulated an all-time record of 416–331 (.557).

A separate MSL franchise was subsequently placed in Morristown on June 20. This came about when the owners of the Maryville-Alcoa Twins surrendered their franchise to the league on June 19 due to financial problems of its own. They became known as the Morristown Reds. Like the Red Sox, the Reds withdrew from the league on July 1 due to a lack of good players and financial losses. The city went without another team for five years until the Morristown Cubs joined the Appalachian League in 1959.

== Season-by-season results ==
Season	Regular season				Postseason			Ref.
Season	Record	Win %	Finish	GB	Record	Win %	Result	Ref.
1948	70–46	.603	1st	—	6–4	.600	Result	Won semifinals vs. Newport Canners, 3–2; Won MSL championship vs. Hazard Bombers, 3–2
1949	72–52	.581	2nd	11	5–5	.500	Won semifinals vs. Jenkins Cavaliers, 3–2; Lost MSL championship vs. Harlan Smokies, 3–2	
1950	56–67	.455	6th	24	—	—	—	
1951	86–39	.688	2nd	6 1/2	3–4	.429	Won semifinals vs. Middlesboro Athletics, 3–1; Lost MSL championship vs. Hazard Bombers, 3–0	
1952	61–58	.513	3rd	26	3–4	.429	Won semifinals vs. Hazard Bombers, 3–1; Lost MSL championship vs. Harlan Smokies, 3–0	
1953	64–62	.508	4th	15	1–3	.250	Lost semifinals vs. Knoxville Smokies, 3–1	
1954	7–7	.500	DNF	DNF	—	—	—	
Totals	416–331	.557	—	—	18–20	.474	—	—

== Notable players ==
Three Red Sox also played in at least one game in Major League Baseball during their careers. These players and their seasons with Morristown were:

- Tony Ordeñana (1954)
- Pedro Ramos (1953–1954)
- Nap Reyes (1953–1954)
