= Oak Ridge Bombers =

- 1948; Oak Ridge, Tennessee

Minor league affiliations
- Class: Class D
- League: Mountain States League

Major league affiliations
- Team: Unaffiliated

Minor league titles
- League titles (0): None

Team data
- Ballpark: Ridgeview Park

The Oak Ridge Bombers were a Minor League Baseball team that played in the Class D Mountain States League in 1948. The Bombers were located in Oak Ridge, Tennessee and played their home games at Ridgeview Park.

Poor fan support caused the Bombers to operate at a loss from Opening Day. By the second week of June, the team had the league's lowest attendance despite having the league's best record. On June 10, in first place with a 24–11 (.686) record, owner Bob Broome relocated the team to Hazard, Kentucky, where they became the Hazard Bombers.

Across both Oak Ridge and Hazard, the Bombers accumulated a 65–43 (.602) record, placing second. They defeated the Pennington Gap Miners in the semifinals, three games to none, but lost the playoff championship finals to the Morristown Red Sox, three games to two.
