= Pedro Ramos =

Cuban baseball player (born 1935)

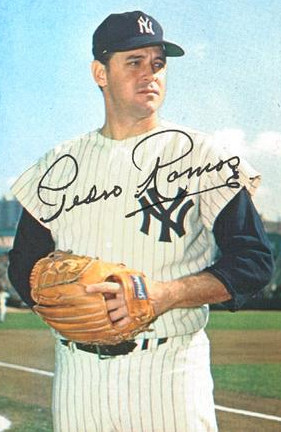
- Ramos, circa 1964–66
- Pitcher
- Born: April 28, 1935 (age 91); Pinar del Río, Cuba
- Batted: Switch Threw: Right

MLB debut
- April 11, 1955, for the Washington Senators

Last MLB appearance
- April 25, 1970, for the Washington Senators

MLB statistics
- Win–loss record: 117–160
- Earned run average: 4.08
- Strikeouts: 1,305
- Stats at Baseball Reference

Teams
- Washington Senators / Minnesota Twins (1955–1961); Cleveland Indians (1962–1964); New York Yankees (1964–1966); Philadelphia Phillies (1967); Pittsburgh Pirates (1969); Cincinnati Reds (1969); Washington Senators (1970)

Career highlights and awards
- All-Star (1959²)

Pedro ("Pete") Ramos Guerra (born April 28, 1935) is a Cuban former professional baseball pitcher, who played in Major League Baseball (MLB) for the Washington Senators / Minnesota Twins, Cleveland Indians, New York Yankees, and the expansion Washington Senators, all of the American League (AL), and the Philadelphia Phillies, Pittsburgh Pirates, and Cincinnati Reds, all of the National League (NL), over the course of a 15-year career (1955–1967; 1969–1970). Ramos was elected to the AL All-Star team in 1959. He led the league in losses four times, in 1958 (18), 1959 (19), 1960 (18), and 1961 (20). On April 11, 1961, the first game for the newly relocated Twins, Ramos was the winning pitcher, when the team defeated the Yankees, 6–0, at Yankee Stadium.

== Early life ==
Ramos was born on April 28, 1935, in Pinar del Rio, Cuba. He worked on his father’s tobacco farm as a teenager. He played Cuban amateur baseball as a teenager. At 17, he was signed by legendary scout Joe Cambria to play for the Washington Senators.

== Baseball career ==
=== Minor leagues ===
In 1953, at only 18 years old, Ramos pitched for the Class D Morristown Red Sox of the Mountain States League. He pitched in 33 games, starting five, with a 7–6 record and 6.26 earned run average (ERA). He pitched only one more year in the American minor leagues before joining the Washington Senators in 1955.

=== Major leagues ===
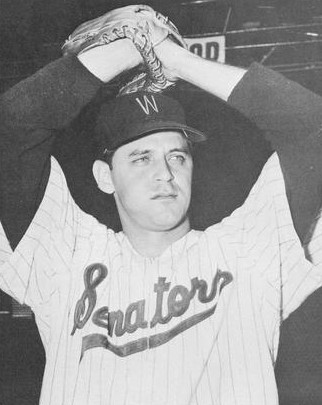
Ramos in 1960

==== Washington Senators/Minnesota Twins ====
In 1955, Ramos began his major league career with the Senators, knowing no English, which he learned by watching cowboy movies. He played on the team from 1955-1960, and moved with the team to Minnesota, when it became the Minnesota Twins in 1961. From 1955-59 the Senators never won more than 63 games in a season and finished in last place four times. They won only 73 games in 1960 (5th place) and 70 games in their first year as the Minnesota Twins (7th place). Ramos started the Twins very first game, pitching a shutout win over the Yankees and Whitey Ford.

In 1955, as a 20 year old who never played above Class B baseball, Ramos pitched in 45 games, starting nine. He finished the season with a 5–11 record, 3.88 ERA and five saves. He had only one winning season with the lowly Senators and Twins over the next six years (12–10 in 1956), and led the American League in losses from 1958-1961, chiefly as a starting pitcher. In 1956, he gave up one of the longest home runs ever hit, to future teammate Mickey Mantle. In 1960, his 3.45 ERA was 25th best in both leagues, but his loss total (18) was tied for second worst in all of baseball among over 200 pitchers. In 1961, his 3.95 ERA was 47th in both leagues, but his loss total the worst in both leagues among over 200 pitchers.

==== Cleveland Indians ====
On April 2, 1962, the Twins traded Ramos to Cleveland Indians in exchange for Vic Power and Dick Stigman. In his first year with Cleveland he had a 10–12 record with a 3.75 ERA. The team finished the year with an 80–82 record, in 6th place. His ERA was 36th best in all of baseball, and his losses were tied for 34th worst in the major leagues among over 200 pitchers. In 1963 for Cleveland, he had a 9–8 record, his first winning record since 1956, and a career-low 3.12 ERA as a starter. Ramos played almost the entire 1964 season for Cleveland, starting 19 of 36 games in which he appeared, with 5.14 ERA and 7–10 record.

==== New York Yankees ====
On September 5, 1964, Cleveland traded Ramos to the Yankees for $75,000 and two players to be named later (after the season, the Indians received Ralph Terry and Bud Daley).

The Yankees traded for Ramos to improve their relief pitching staff during a tight pennant race. A starter most of his career, Ramos became an unexpected sensation in September 1964 after 13 appearances for the Yankees, all in relief. Ramos saved eight games, won a game, and posted a 1.25 ERA as the Yankees barely held off the Chicago White Sox and Baltimore Orioles down the pennant stretch. In 21 innings, Ramos struck out 21 batters and walked none. Because the trade came after August 31, Ramos was not eligible to pitch in the World Series, which New York lost in seven games to the Bob Gibson-led St. Louis Cardinals. His Yankee teammates still voted that he get one-half of a player's share of their World Series earnings.

=== Legacy ===
As a Senator, in his second big-league season, Ramos surrendered one of the more memorable home runs in the career of Yankees slugger Mickey Mantle. On May 30, 1956, Mantle tore into a Ramos pitch and nearly drove it out of Yankee Stadium, hitting the facade of the top deck in right field. In their heyday, Ramos and Mantle were considered among the fastest runners in the major leagues. Mantle and Ramos raced with Ramos stumbling at the start, Mantle winning. The New York Times reported, however, that while Ramos repeatedly challenged Mantle to a footrace, Mantle declined, seeing no upside.

As a hitter, Ramos was an occasional home run threat. He posted a .155 batting average (109-for-703) with 76 runs, hitting 15 home runs with 56 RBI. Defensively, he recorded a .977 fielding percentage, which was 19 points higher than the league average at his position.

Ramos also had a notable career pitching in the Cuban Winter League.

== Personal life ==
After retiring from baseball, Ramos served as a coach in Central and South America. He also manufactured his own brand of cigars. Ramos spent some time in prison.

== See also ==
- List of Major League Baseball all-time leaders in home runs by pitchers
