= Elizabethton Phils =

- 1937–1951; (1937–1942, 1945–1951); Elizabethton, Tennessee

Minor league affiliations
- Class: Class D (1937–1942, 1945–1951)
- League: Appalachian League (1937–1942, 1945–1951)

Major league affiliations
- Team: Philadelphia Phillies (1951); Chicago Cubs (1945–1948); Brooklyn Dodgers (1941); Boston Red Sox (1937–1940)

Minor league titles
- League titles (2): 1939; 1941
- First-half titles (1): 1937
- Second-half titles (2): 1940; 1941

Team data
- Name: Elizabethton Phils (1951); Elizabethton Betsy Local (1949–1950); Elizabethton Betsy Cubs (1945–1948); Elizabethton Betsy Red Sox (1937–1942)
- Ballpark: Cherokee Park (1937–1942, 1945–1951)

The Elizabethton Phils were a Minor League Baseball team that played in the Class D Appalachian League from 1937 to 1942 and 1945 to 1951. They were located in Elizabethton, Tennessee, and played their home games at Cherokee Park.

The team was originally known as the Elizabethton Betsy Red Sox for their affiliation with the Boston Red Sox (1937–1940). They retained the moniker in 1941 when they served as a farm club for the Brooklyn Dodgers and in 1942 with no Major League Baseball affiliate. After two years of inactivity due to World War II, the team was revived as the Elizabethton Betsy Cubs for their affiliation with the Chicago Cubs (1945–1948), the Elizabethton Betsy Local during two years as an independent club (1949–1950), and the Phils in affiliation with the Philadelphia Phillies (1951).

Over 13 seasons, Elizabethton compiled an all-time regular season record of 811–702 (.536). The Red Sox qualified for postseason playoffs on nine occasions and won the Appalachian League championship in 1939 and 1941. Their all-time postseason record was 24–24 (.500).

== History ==
=== Betsy Red Sox (1937–1942) ===
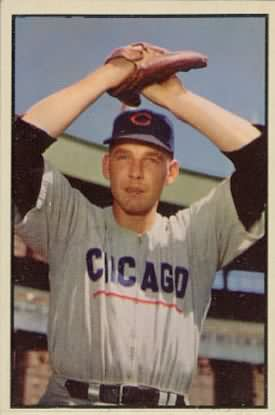
Paul Minner led the 1942 Elizabethton Red Sox with 18 wins and a 1.41 ERA.

The Red Sox became the first professional baseball team to hail from Elizabethton, Tennessee, when they joined the Class D Appalachian League in 1937. The team's moniker was a combination of the city's nickname, "Betsy Town", and that of their Major League Baseball affiliate, the Boston Red Sox. Elizabethton won its opening game on the road, defeating the Johnson City Soldiers, 10–7, on May 21. They played their first home game at Cherokee Park before a crowd of around 1,000 people on May 27, defeating Johnson City, 9–5. They went on to win the first half of the season and finish their inaugural campaign with a league-best 57–45 (.559) record. In the playoffs for the Appalachian League championship, Elizabethton was defeated by the Pennington Gap Lee Bears, 3–2, in the best-of-five series. The 1938 team again paced the league with a first-place 65–36 (.644) record, but were eliminated in the semifinals by the Greeneville Burley Cubs, 2–0.

The 1939 Red Sox finished atop the standings having posted a 71–48 (.597) season. They defeated Greeneville in the semifinals, 2–1, before winning their first Appalachian League championship over the Kingsport Cherokees, 3–1. In 1940, Elizabethton returned to the playoffs with a second-half title and a first-place 84–33 (.718) mark. They beat Kingsport in the opening round, 2–0, but lost the finals to the Johnson City Cardinals, 3–0.

Elizabethon's affiliation with the Boston Red Sox ended after the 1940 season, but they retained the Red Sox nickname after affiliating with the Brooklyn Dodgers for 1941. They repeated with a second-half title and a 73–45 (.619) record, the league's best. After defeating the Newport Canners, 3–2, in the semifinals, the Red Sox won their second AL championship by sweeping Johnson City, 3–0.

The Brooklyn affiliation ended after the 1941 season, and the Red Sox were unaffiliated with a Major League Baseball team in 1942. On June 9, Pat McGlothin pitched a no-hitter against Newport in a 2–0 win at Cherokee Park. They ended the season in second place at 60–47 (.561), 11 games out of first. They best Johnson City, 2–1, in the semifinals, but lost the AL championship to the Bristol Twins, 2–0.

Over six years of competition in the Appalachian League, the Red Sox accumulated a 410–254 (.617) record. The city did not field a team from 1943 to 1944.

=== Betsy Cubs (1945–1948) ===
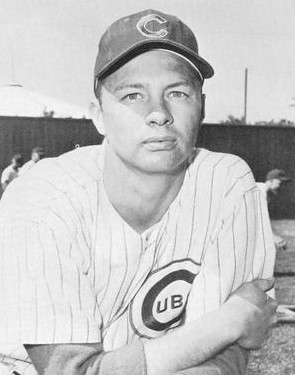
Don Elston of the 1948 team went on to be selected as an MLB All-Star in 1959.

The Elizabethton Appalachian League franchise was revived in 1945 as the Elizabethton Betsy Cubs, an affiliate of the Chicago Cubs. Though they finished last of four teams with a 38–68 (.358) record, every team participated in the postseason playoffs. The Cubs lost to the Bristol Twins, 3–1, in the semifinals. Elizabethton improved to third of eight clubs in 1946 with a 68–57 (.544) mark. They swept Bristol in the semifinals, 3–0, but lost the AL title to the New River Rebels, 4–2, in the finals.

On May 25, 1947, Robert Knaub and Jack Bunger pitched a combined no-hitter against the Kingsport Indians. Kingsport managed to score three runs in the first inning, which were charged to Bunger, who started the game and walked five batters before being relieved by Knaub in the first. Knaub held the Indians hitless until the game was called on account of rain after six innings with the Cubs ahead, 5–3. Elizabethton just missed the playoffs in 1947 (62–64; .492) and 1948 (64–61; .512) with fifth-place finishes.

=== Betsy Local (1949–1950) ===
The Chicago Cubs withdrew from the Appalachian League after 1948, so Elizabethton continued as an unaffiliated team in 1949. Competing as the Elizabethton Betsy Local, the team finished seventh of eight clubs at 40–76 (.345). They missed a contracted two-team playoff championship in 1950, finishing fourth at 72–52 (.581).

=== Phils (1951) ===
After two seasons as an independent club, the team affiliated with the Philadelphia Phillies for 1951, becoming the Elizabethton Phils. They qualified for the playoffs with a 57–70 (.449) season, but were eliminated in the semifinals by the Kingsport Cherokees, 2–0. The Phils lost their final game before their home crown, 7–1, on September 8. Over their second stretch in the Appalachian League, Elizabethton accumulated a record of 401–448 (.472). Over all 13 seasons, their all-time record was 811–702 (.536).

The city went without a team for 36 years until the Minnesota Twins placed the Elizabethton Twins in the Appalachian League as a Rookie-level affiliate in 1974.

== Season-by-season results ==
Season	Regular season				Postseason			MLB affiliate	Ref.
Season	Record	Win %	Finish	GB	Record	Win %	Result	MLB affiliate	Ref.
1937	57–45	.559	1st	—	2–3	.400	Result	Won first half Lost AL championship vs. Pennington Gap Lee Bears, 3–2	Boston Red Sox
1938	65–36	.644	1st	—	0–2	.000	Lost semifinals vs. Greeneville Burley Cubs, 2–0	Boston Red Sox	
1939	71–48	.597	1st	—	5–2	.714	Won semifinals vs. Greeneville Burley Cubs, 2–1; Won AL championship vs. Kingsport Cherokees, 3–1	Boston Red Sox	
1940	84–33	.718	1st	—	2–3	.400	Won second half Won first round vs. Kingsport Cherokees, 2–0; Lost AL championship vs. Johnson City Cardinals, 3–0	Boston Red Sox	
1941	73–45	.619	1st	—	6–2	.750	Won second half Won semifinals vs. Newport Canners, 3–2; Won AL championship vs. Johnson City Cardinals, 3–0	Brooklyn Dodgers	
1942	60–47	.561	2nd	11	2–3	.400	Won semifinals vs. Johnson City Cardinals, 2–1; Lost AL championship vs. Bristol Twins, 2–0	—	
1945	38–68	.358	4th	33 1/2	2–3	.400	Lost semifinals vs. Bristol Twins, 3–1	Chicago Cubs	
1946	68–57	.544	3rd	16	5–4	.556	Won semifinals vs. Bristol Twins, 3–0; Lost AL championship vs. New River Rebels, 4–2	Chicago Cubs	
1947	62–64	.492	5th	19	—	—	—	Chicago Cubs	
1948	64–61	.512	5th	21	—	—	—	Chicago Cubs	
1949	40–76	.345	7th	45	—	—	—	—	
1950	72–52	.581	4th	10	—	—	—	—	
1951	57–70	.449	4th	27	0–2	.000	Lost semifinals vs. Kingsport Cherokees, 2–0	Philadelphia Phillies	
Totals	811–702	.536	—	—	24–24	.500	—	—	—

== Notable players ==
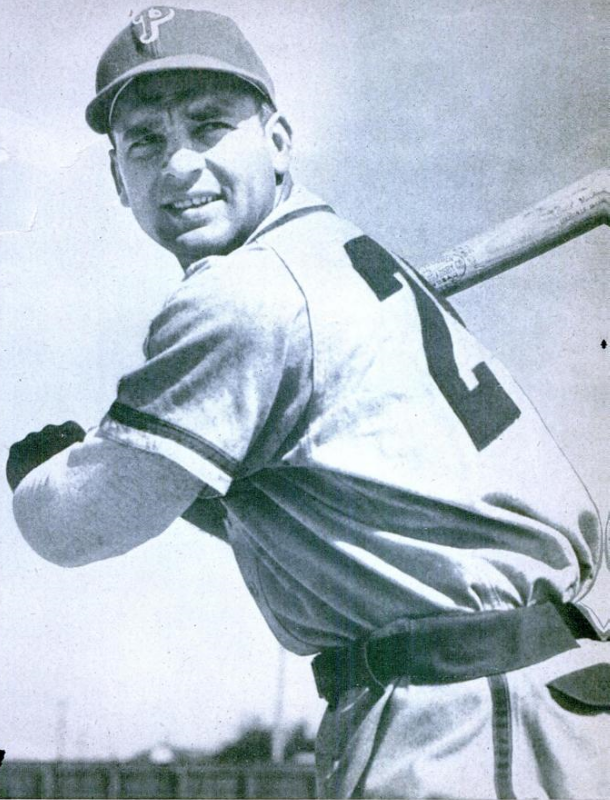
Andy Seminick of the 1948 team went on to be selected as an MLB All-Star in 1949.

Twelve players also played in at least one game in Major League Baseball during their careers. These players and their seasons with Elizabethton were:

- Bob Borkowski (1946)
- Jim Brosnan (1947)
- Don Elston (1948)
- Lew Flick (1938–1942)
- Bert Hodges (1937–1939)
- Fred Marsh (1942)
- Pat McGlothin (1942)
- Paul Minner (1942)
- Lou Rochelli (1940)
- Andy Seminick (1941–1942)
- Ray Semproch (1951)
- Lee Tate (1951)
