= Morristown Roosters =

- 1910–1925; (1910–1914, 1923–1925); Morristown, Tennessee

Minor league affiliations
- Class: Class D (1910–1914, 1923–1925)
- League: Appalachian League (1911–1914, 1923–1925); Southeastern League (1910)

Major league affiliations
- Team: Unaffiliated (1910–1914, 1923–1925)

Minor league titles
- League titles (0): None

Team data
- Name: Morristown Roosters (1923–1925); Morristown Jobbers (1910–1914)
- Ballpark: Sherwood Park (1910–1914, 1923–1925)

The Morristown Roosters were a Minor League Baseball team that played in Morristown, Tennessee, from 1910 to 1914 and 1923 to 1925. Known as the Morristown Jobbers, they were members of the Class D Southeastern League in 1910 before moving to the Appalachian League from 1911 to 1914. The team was revived in the Appalachian League as the Roosters from 1923 to 1925. Over eight seasons of competition, their all-time regular season win–loss record was 325–340 (.489).

== History ==
=== First run (1910–1914) ===
The Morristown Jobbers became the first professional baseball team to hail from Morristown, Tennessee, when they joined the Class D Southeastern League in 1910. They won their inaugural game, 4–2, on the road against the Gadsden Steel Makers on June 6. Their Sherwood Park home opener was played on June 13. The Jobbers defeated the Asheville Moonshiners, 7–6, before a home crowd of over 1,000 people. On June 20, Douglas pitched a no-hitter against the Rome Romans, a 6–0 win. Morristown ended their first season in second place with a record of 46–37 (.554), 5 1/2 games behind the champion Knoxville Appalachians.

Rather than continue in the Southeastern League, the Jobbers moved to the newly formed Class D Appalachian League for 1911. They placed fourth at 46–50 (.479). In 1912, they posted a franchise-low 41–60 (.406) record, finishing last of six teams. Morristown initially did not field another team in 1913. This changed after league president Walter E. Rodgers surrendered his Cleveland Counts to the league fearing the circuit would soon collapse due to the recent withdrawal of the Bristol Boosters. The league operated the team until it was transferred to Morristown as the Jobbers on June 7. On August 21, Cliff Markle tossed a no-hitter against the Knoxville Reds, winning 3–0. Combined, the Cleveland/Morristown team finished third at 55–46 (.545).

Following the disbandment of the Harriman Boosters on June 17, 1914, and the other three teams in the circuit losing money from poor attendance, the Appalachian League disbanded on June 18. The Jobbers' last game was a 5–4 loss to the Middlesboro Colonels on June 17. They were tied with the Colonels for first place at 15–13 (.536). Their five-year record across the Southeastern and Appalachian Leagues was 203–206 (.496).

=== Second run (1923–1925) ===
The Appalachian League reorganized seven years later in 1921 without a Morristown team. The Morristown franchise was revived in 1923 as the Morristown Roosters. In the season opener on May 11, the Roosters were defeated by the Knoxville Pioneers, 5–3. At the season's end, Morristown was last of six teams with a 45–60 (.429) record. In 1924, the club improved to 55–52 (.514), placing second, but missed the playoffs having not won either half of the split season.

On July 15, 1925, the Bristol State Liners dropped out of the league due to financial difficulties, and the remaining three-team league disbanded the same day. The Roosters won both games of a doubleheader against the Greeneville Burley Cubs, 3–2 and 10–4, on July 15. At the time of the disbandment, Morristown was in second place with a 22–22 (.500) record, six games behind Greeneville. Over their second stint of three seasons in the Appalachian League, the team had accumulated a record of 122–134 (.477). Over all eight years in the Southeastern and Appalachian Leagues, their all-time record was 325–340 (.489).

The city went without another team for 23 years until the Morristown Red Sox became charter members of the Mountain States League in 1948.

== Season-by-season results ==
Season	Regular season				Postseason			Ref.
Season	Record	Win %	Finish	GB	Record	Win %	Result	Ref.
1910	46–37	.554	2nd	5 1/2	—	—	Result	—
1911	46–50	.479	4th	13 1/2	—	—	—	
1912	41–60	.406	6th	16 1/2	—	—	—	
1913	55–46	.545	3rd	9 1/2	—	—	—	
1914	15–13	.536	1st (tie)	—	—	—	—	
1923	45–60	.429	6th	21 1/2	—	—	—	
1924	55–52	.514	2nd (tie)	10 1/2	—	—	—	
1925	22–22	.500	2nd	6	—	—	—	
Totals	325–340	.489	—	—	—	—	—	—

== Notable players ==
Lefty Williams of the 1912 team was involved in the 1919 World Series fix, known as the Black Sox Scandal.

Nine Jobbers/Roosters also played in at least one game in Major League Baseball during their careers. These players and their seasons with Morristown were:

- Tiny Graham (1913)
- Harvey Grubb (1911–1912)
- Harry Hedgpeth (1911)
- Cliff Markle (1913)
- Lee Meadows (1912)
- Scottie Slayback (1924)
- Buck Thrasher (1913)
- Fritz Von Kolnitz (1913)
- Lefty Williams (1912)
