= Ken Hubbs =

American baseball player (1941–1964)

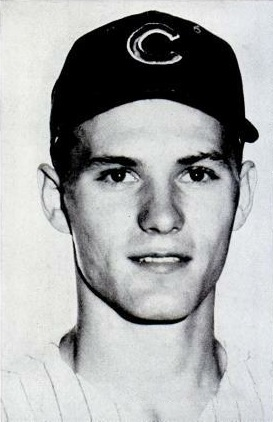
- Hubbs with Cubs in 1963
- Second baseman
- Born: December 23, 1941; Riverside, California, U.S.
- Died: February 13, 1964 (aged 22); Provo, Utah, U.S.
- Batted: Right Threw: Right

MLB debut
- September 10, 1961, for the Chicago Cubs

Last MLB appearance
- September 29, 1963, for the Chicago Cubs

MLB statistics
- Batting average: .247
- Home runs: 14
- Runs batted in: 98
- Stats at Baseball Reference

Teams
- Chicago Cubs (1961–1963)

Career highlights and awards
- NL Rookie of the Year (1962); Gold Glove Award (1962)

Kenneth Douglass Hubbs (December 23, 1941 – February 13, 1964) was an American professional baseball player. He played in Major League Baseball as a second baseman for the Chicago Cubs from 1961 to 1963. Hubbs died at age 22 when the private plane he was piloting crashed in a snow storm near Provo, Utah prior to the 1964 season.

In his short big-league career he was an excellent fielder, already earning a Gold Glove Award; assessments of his hitting were more mixed, as he was still developing as a hitter. In 1962, becoming the first rookie in baseball history to win a Gold Glove Award, Hubbs set several fielding records and convincingly won the 1962 National League Rookie of the Year Award. At the time of his death, Hubbs was among the best defensive second basemen in the game.

== Early life ==
Hubbs was born in Riverside, California, on December 23, 1941, the son of Eulis and Dorothy Hubbs. The family resided in nearby Colton, California. Ken was the second oldest of five boys, raised with brothers Keith, Gary, and twins Kirk and Kraig.

When he was a few months old, in the spring of 1942, Hubbs suffered a ruptured hernia, and wore a truss for five years until it healed while he was in kindergarten. A doctor had told the family that Hubbs "will never be able to do things other kids can do in sports."

Hubbs played in the 1954 Little League World Series, as his Colton little league team advanced and represented California. California beat Virginia in the first round and Illinois in the second. In the final game of the Series, the team from Schenectady, New York beat California 5–3. Two future big league players played on the Schenectady team: Jim Barbieri and Billy Connors. Connors and Hubbs would become minor league teammates. Highlights of Hubbs playing defense at shortstop were captured on film. The video includes a play where Hubbs ran from the shortstop position to back up the second baseman and caught a bloop fly into short right field. Hubbs had stepped in a hole during a picnic, just before Colton's trip to the Little League World Series, breaking his toe. Hubbs played the entire tournament with the injury, hobbling around the bases when he hit a home run.

=== High school ===
At Colton High School, Hubbs was a four sport athlete. He excelled in three sports, baseball, basketball and football at a national level and also competed in track as a high jumper. Honored by the California Interscholastic Federation in all three sports, Hubbs was an All-Southern Section for two years in football, basketball and baseball, an achievement matched at the time, 1959, by only three others: Glenn Davis, Bill McColl and Marty Keough.

A gifted athlete, Hubbs could pitch with either arm and at 6'2", could stand flat-footed under a basket, jump and dunk a basketball behind his head with both hands. In 1958–1959, he was a high school All-American in two sports, football (quarterback) and basketball. He was recruited by the University of Notre Dame to play quarterback and offered a scholarship by UCLA's John Wooden to play basketball.

In 1958, in a well-publicized basketball game at Long Beach City College against Santa Maria High School, Hubbs made a half-court shot to end the first half. He followed up by scoring five points in the last 23 seconds of regulation, including a jumper at the buzzer to send the game into overtime, scoring 23 points in a Colton 53–49 win.

After breaking his foot before a football game, Hubbs put his foot with a cast inside a size-14 shoe and played that Friday night.

"Ken was undoubtedly the best football player I ever coached," said Joe Lash, his football coach at Colton High School. His basketball coach, Tom Morrow, said, "Kenny Hubbs was the best all-around basketball player I ever saw for a boy his age."

After high school graduation in 1959, Hubbs was weighing attending college at either the University of Southern California or Brigham Young University. However, Cubs scout Gene Handley signed Hubbs to a contract that came with a $50,000 signing bonus.

== Baseball career ==
=== Minor leagues ===
Hubbs signed as an amateur free agent with the Chicago Cubs prior to the 1959 season.

In 1959, Hubbs played for the Morristown Cubs of the Class D Appalachian League. Playing outfield and shortstop in the all-rookie competition, Hubbs appeared in 59 games, had 198 at-bats and a batting average of .298. His 50 runs batted in and eight home runs were enough to earn a nomination for player of the year.

On July 18, 1959, he led Morristown to a 20–0 victory over the first place Salem Pirates. Hubbs hit two home runs and a double and scored five runs. Morristown continued the offensive barrage five days later against Wytheville. Hubbs started a seven-run first inning with a home run, and his team won the slugfest, 9–7.

Organized baseball initiated a player draft in 1959, in an attempt to cut down on large signing bonuses given to young players. The Cubs' Triple-A club, the Fort Worth Cats of the American Association, recalled Hubbs in October and then purchased his contract outright in November. Hubbs appeared in nine games for Fort Worth, with two hits in nine at bats. This maneuvering protected Hubbs from being drafted by another club, and was a sign that the Cubs clearly expected Hubbs to make the major league team in the near future.

Hubbs attended the Cubs' rookie camp in 1960 as a shortstop/outfielder, however with Ernie Banks established at shortstop, Hubbs moved to second base in 1961.

In 1960, Hubbs began the season with the Class A Lancaster Red Roses of the Eastern League, where he hit .216 with six home runs and 47 RBI in 97 games and 366 at-bats playing under manager Phil Cavarretta. He finished 1960 by playing 38 games with the Class AA San Antonio Missions of the Texas League, hitting .220 with one home run and 9 RBI.

Coach Bobby Adams was instrumental in Hubbs transition to second base. "He had me work on the pivot 100 times a day. I was doing it in my sleep." Hubbs said of Adams. "Every day, Lou Klein and Bobby Adams would have me out there practicing the double play, thousands of times, I was almost ready to quit and go home. I don't know what kept me going, but I'm glad I didn’t quit. I've decided this is where I want to be."

Hubbs played in 1961 for the Class AA Wenatchee Chiefs of the Northwest League. With Wenatchee, Hubbs played 138 games, hitting .286 with nine home runs and 68 RBI, along with 20 doubles, six triples and nine stolen bases. Hubbs was then called up to the Chicago Cubs in September, 1961. Hubbs also committed only eight errors all season.

=== Major league career ===
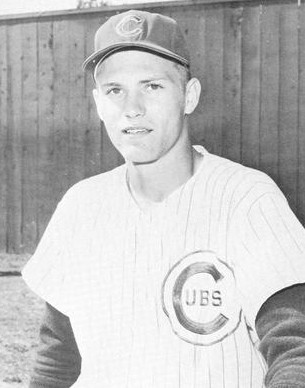
Hubbs with Cubs before the 1964 season

During the 1961 season, the Cubs played Don Zimmer and Jerry Kindall at second base. Zimmer made the National League All-Star team that year, and hit .252, while Kindall hit .242. Hubbs made his major league debut on September 10, 1961, against the Philadelphia Phillies, with three at-bats, two hits and one run batted in in a 12-5 Cub loss. Outfielder Lou Brock also made his debut that day for the Cubs. Overall, Hubbs played in ten games in September 1961, with five hits in 26 at-bats and one home run, at age 19.

Prior to the 1962 season, the expansion New York Mets drafted Don Zimmer in the 1961 expansion draft and the Cubs subsequently traded Kindall. Their departures opened the door for the 20-year-old Hubbs to become the starting second baseman for the eventual ninth-place Cubs in 1962. Hubbs played in 160 games in 1962 hitting .260, with 172 hits with five home runs and 49 runs batted in. He led all National League rookies in games, hits, doubles, triples, runs and batting average. On April 17, 1962, Hubbs went 5-for-5 with two runs in a 10–6 loss to the Pittsburgh Pirates. "Better learn how to pitch to this boy, he'll be around a long time," said Pirates manager Danny Murtaugh.

Hubbs was named the 1962 Rookie of the Year, earning 19 out of 20 votes. He was also named the Rookie of the year by The Sporting News, receiving 120 votes. Hubbs became the second consecutive Cubs player to win the award, after Billy Williams had won the award in 1961. The next Cub to win the award was Jerome Walton in 1989.

In the field, Hubbs was outstanding. As a rookie, he set major league records with 78 consecutive games and 418 total chances without an error, breaking Bobby Doerr's Major League records in both categories. In post season awards, Hubbs became the first rookie to win a Gold Glove Award. He also led the league in two less desirable categories that season by striking out 129 times and grounding into 20 double plays. On September 30, he started a triple play in the final game of the season against the Mets. His glove from 1962 is on display at the Baseball Hall of Fame.

Partway through the 1962 season, Cubs owner Philip Wrigley called Hubbs into his office, tore up his existing contract and doubled his salary.

Hubbs was well liked by his teammates, who included future Hall of Famers Billy Williams, Ernie Banks, Ron Santo and Lou Brock. Banks remembered, "Lots of young players do something special and you can't talk to them any more. Not Ken. One day, he got seven hits in a doubleheader. Pretty good for a rookie. But he didn't talk or act any differently than when he didn't get a hit." Hubbs was known for his faith. Reporters often noted that he did not smoke or drink alcohol, and that he attended church services while on the road with the team. With Hubbs's encouragement, Ron Santo quit smoking.

"He was a Mormon, deeply religious, never swore, never drank, played hard, played the game," reflected Santo. "He was talented. You knew this guy was going to be great. He would always go out with us. He wouldn't drink, but he'd have as much fun as we did."

In 1963, Hubbs played in 155 games and batted .235 with eight home runs and 47 runs batted in and his superior fielding helped the Cubs finish over .500 at 82–80.

== Death ==
Hubbs decided to challenge his fear of flying head-on by taking flying lessons in the winter of 1963–1964, and received his pilot's license in January 1964. On February 12, Hubbs flew from California to Provo, Utah, with his friend Denny Doyle to surprise Doyle's wife, who had recently given birth to the couple's child. That night, Hubbs played in a charity basketball game sponsored by Brigham Young University.

A snow storm developed in the Utah Valley the morning of February 13. Hubbs attempted to beat the storm, and he and Doyle took off in a red and white Cessna 172 from Provo Airport. Hubbs had not filed a flight plan but told airport staff that the pair were heading for Morrow Field near Colton, California. Euliss Hubbs, Ken's father, reported that they had not arrived in Colton by Friday the 14th, prompting a search in areas of Utah, Nevada and California along the possible flight path.

There was no radio contact with Hubbs after takeoff, prompting Utah's civil aeronautics director, Harlon Bement, to suspect "the plane could be fairly close [by]." The wreckage was found a quarter mile south of Bird Island in Utah Lake. Both Hubbs and Doyle died in the crash. The air temperature was estimated as -1 °F, and it had been snowing heavily.

Hubbs's funeral was held several days later in his hometown of Colton. Services were held in the Colton High School Whitmer Auditorium because of the huge crowd, and the automobile procession to his burial was two miles long. Fellow Cubs Ron Santo, Ernie Banks, Glen Hobbie and Don Elston were among the pallbearers. He was buried at Montecito Memorial Park, in Colton.

Santo had visited his friend and teammate in California two days before the crash and had gone up in Hubbs' plane during the visit. After parting, Santo went home to Seattle, while Hubbs headed to Provo. Santo recalled Hubbs saying, "When I get up there, Ron, and I fly, it's like being next to God. It's like I’m next to God."

Ernie Banks said, "Any athlete who ever played with Hubbs will dedicate the rest of his career to Ken because he was the zenith in inspiration and enthusiasm as well as desire and determination."

Jim Murray of the Los Angeles Times wrote, "Kenneth Douglass Hubbs was more than just another baseball player. He was the kind of athlete all games need. A devout Mormon, a cheerful leader, a picture-book player, blond-haired, healthy, generous with his time for young boys; he was the kind of youth in short supply in these selfish times."

"There isn't a man in Chicago who wouldn't have been proud to have him as a son," said Chicago Mayor Richard J. Daley.

"Ken and I were both religious, we were always joking — trying to convert each other. I'm Catholic, he was a Mormon. But after he died, I had to see a priest," said Ron Santo. "I couldn’t understand it. I mean, he loved life. He was a great human being. This was a kid who didn't even smoke or drink. Why him?"

Lou Boudreau, who then was a Cubs' radio announcer, said, "At the time he died, I felt he was on his way to a Hall of Fame career. His bat hadn't come around, but it would have."

"Kenny would have been one of the all-time greats," said Don Elston. "Kenny was one of the to-be all-stars, Hall of Famers."

Billy Connors, Hubbs' Little League world series rival, became a teammate and friend in the minor leagues. Connors eventually became a long time major league pitching coach. He said of Hubbs, "I've seen a lot of professional players through the years, but I would describe Kenny as a perfect player. He had great talent, great makeup, an amazing will to win."

== Personal life ==
Hubbs came from a devout Mormon family and often visited children in hospitals and spoke to church groups. His older brother Keith Hubbs played football for the BYU Cougars. Keith founded the Ken Hubbs Foundation in 1964 and served as president for 38 years.

Hubbs was awarded the 1959 Los Angeles Examiner Trophy as the “Best All-Around Athlete in Southern California”. After his death, the Ken Hubbs Foundation was established in his honor. Hubbs' glove used in the errorless streak in 1962 is on display at the Baseball Hall of Fame in Cooperstown, New York. Colton High School named their gymnasium the "Ken Hubbs Gymnasium". A collection of trophies and other memorabilia are on site. Hubbs's uniform number 16 was never retired by the Cubs, but was kept out of circulation until 1970, when it was assigned to Roger Metzger.

In 1964, Topps issued a special card for Hubbs with a black band and reverse white text reading, "In Memoriam" on the card face. The card was numbered 550. In 2002, the Chicago Cubs honored Hubbs' memory, with “Ken Hubbs Memorial” day at Wrigley Field. Fans in attendance received a replica of his 1962 Topps Rookie Baseball card.

=== Ken Hubbs Award ===
The Ken Hubbs Award has been presented by the Ken Hubbs Foundation since its inception in 1964 to the top high school athletes in the greater San Bernardino, California. The award was split into boys and girls winners in 2012, with the Keith Hubbs Winner award for high character added in 2019. Notable winners include Pro Football Hall of Fame player Ronnie Lott (1977), MLB player Greg Colbrunn (1987), Olympic runner Ryan Hall (2001), NFL player Kenny Clark (2013), and Heisman Trophy winner Jayden Daniels (2019).

== See also ==
- List of baseball players who died during their careers
