= Oak Ridge Pioneers =

- 1954; Oak Ridge, Tennessee

Minor league affiliations
- Class: Class C
- League: Mountain States League

Major league affiliations
- Team: Unaffiliated

Minor league titles
- League titles (0): None

Team data
- Ballpark: Ridgeview Park
- Manager: Bert Niehoff

The Oak Ridge Pioneers were a Minor League Baseball team that played in the Class C Mountain States League in 1954. They were located in Oak Ridge, Tennessee, and played their home games at Ridgeview Park. Bert Niehoff, a former Major League Baseball second baseman, served as the Pioneers' manager and general manager.

Oak Ridge lost its season opener on April 24 to the Maryville-Alcoa Twins, 6–1, before 2,800 people in attendance at Ridgeview Park. They won the next night on the road, defeating the Twins, 5–4. The Pioneers were one of three teams in the eight-team circuit still playing when the league disbanded on July 20. They compiled a win–loss record of 35–43 (.449), placing sixth out of seven teams, in their only season of competition.
