= Morristown Cubs =

- 1959–1961; Morristown, Tennessee

Minor league affiliations
- Class: Class D Short Season (1959–1961)
- League: Appalachian League (1959–1961)

Major league affiliations
- Team: Chicago Cubs (1959–1961)

Minor league titles
- Pennants (1): 1959

Team data
- Name: Morristown Cubs (1959–1961)
- Ballpark: Sherwood Park (1959–1961)

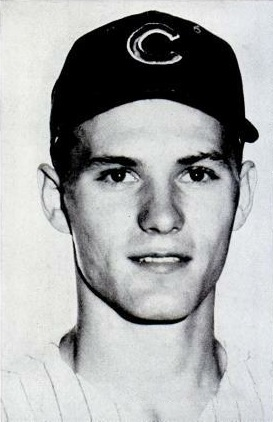
Ken Hubbs of the 1959 team won the 1962 National League Rookie of the Year Award.

The Morristown Cubs were a Minor League Baseball team that played in the Class D Short Season Appalachian League from 1959 to 1961. They were located in Morristown, Tennessee, and were named for their Major League Baseball affiliate, the Chicago Cubs. Morristown won the Appalachian League pennant in 1959.

== History ==
Professional baseball in Morristown, Tennessee, began in 1910 when the Morristown Jobbers became charter members of the Southeastern League. The Jobbers continued in the Appalachian League in 1911 and, with the exception of a brief absence in the first month of the 1913 campaign, played each season through 1914. From 1923 to 1925, the city's entry in the league was called the Morristown Roosters. In 1948, the Morristown Red Sox became charter members of the Mountain States League in which they played through 1954. The Red Sox folded early in the 1954 season and were replaced in the league by the Morristown Reds.

After four years without a team, the Morristown Cubs joined the Appalachian League in 1959 as a Class D Short Season affiliate of the Chicago Cubs. As had the city's previous teams, the Cubs played at Sherwood Park. The team was managed in its first season by Red Hayworth, who had played with the St. Louis Browns in 1944 and 1945. Their scheduled June 25 season opener on the road with the Johnson City Phillies was postponed due to wet grounds. They lost the next day's game at home, 7–4, versus the Phillies. The Cubs won their first game on June 28, besting the Bluefield Orioles, 13–6, on the road. Morristown captured the Appalachian League pennant with a 41–27 (.603) record. The feat was accomplished on the last day of the season when the Cubs split their doubleheader with Johnson City and the second-place Salem Rebels lost to the Lynchburg Senators.

The next two iterations of the team were less successful. In 1960, Morristown finished fourth of six teams at 32–35 (.478). The 1961 team was fifth of eight teams with a record of 34–36 (.486). The Cubs played their final game on August 31, defeating Johnson City at home, 8–7, in 14 innings. The city did not field another team after the 1961 season.

== Season-by-season results ==
Season	Regular season				Postseason			Ref.
Season	Record	Win %	Finish	GB	Record	Win %	Result	Ref.
1959	41–27	.603	1st	—	—	—	Result	Won Appalachian League pennant
1960	32–35	.478	4th	9 1/2	—	—	—	
1961	34–36	.486	5th	7	—	—	—	
Totals	107–98	.522	—	—	—	—	—	—

== Notable players ==
Six Cubs also played in at least one game in Major League Baseball during their careers. These players and their seasons with Morristown were:

- Ron Campbell (1960)
- Ossie Chavarría (1959)
- Ken Hubbs (1959)
- Jake Jaeckel (1960)
- Pat Jarvis (1960)
- Nelson Mathews (1959)
