= Morristown Reds =

- 1954; Morristown, Tennessee

Minor league affiliations
- Class: Class C
- League: Mountain States League

Major league affiliations
- Team: Cincinnati Redlegs

Minor league titles
- League titles (0): None

Team data
- Name: Morristown Reds
- Ballpark: Sherwood Park

The Morristown Reds were a Minor League Baseball team that played in the Class C Mountain States League (MSL) in 1954 as an affiliate of the Cincinnati Redlegs. They were located in Morristown, Tennessee, and played their home games at Sherwood Park.

A separate team called the Morristown Red Sox began the 1954 season in the MSL but withdrew on May 19 citing high expenses and low revenues due in part to the league operating with seven teams instead of an even number.

On June 19, the owners of the Maryville-Alcoa Twins surrendered their franchise to the league due to financial problems of its own. The league placed the team in Morristown on June 20, where they became the Morristown Reds, an affiliate of the major league Cincinnati Redlegs. They lost their first two games, a road doubleheader to the Middlesboro Athletics on June 20, 6–4 and 9–1.

Morristown withdrew from the league on July 1 due to a lack of good players and financial losses. They lost both games of a doubleheader to the Kingsport Cherokees, 7–6 and 13–2, on June 30, their final day of play. The Reds went 3–9 (.250) in Morristown. The league ceased operations on July 20.
