= Greeneville Burley Cubs =

- 1921–1942; (1921–1925, 1938–1942); Greeneville, Tennessee

Minor league affiliations
- Class: Class D (1921–1925, 1938–1942)
- League: Appalachian League (1921–1925, 1938–1942)

Major league affiliations
- Team: Boston Braves (1942); Chicago Cubs (1940); Cleveland Indians (1939); Chicago Cubs (1938)

Minor league titles
- League titles (1): 1938
- Pennants (1): 1925
- First-half titles (1): 1921

Team data
- Name: Greeneville Burley Cubs (1921–1925, 1938–1942)
- Ballpark: Greeneville City Park (1938–1942); Unknown (1921–1925)

The Greeneville Burley Cubs were a Minor League Baseball team that played in the Class D Appalachian League from 1921 to 1925 and 1938 to 1942. They were located in Greeneville, Tennessee, and played their home games at Greeneville City Park in their second run and at an unknown ballpark in their first stretch.

The Burly Cubs were affiliated with four Major League Baseball teams over their 10-year run in Greeneville: the Chicago Cubs (1938 and 1940), Cleveland Indians (1939), and Boston Braves (1942). Over all 10 seasons of competition, their all-time regular season win–loss record was 482–486 (.498). They won the Appalachian League pennant in 1925 and the league's playoff championship in 1938.

== History ==
=== First stretch (1921–1925) ===
The Burley Cubs became the first professional baseball team to hail from Greeneville, Tennessee, when they joined the Appalachian League in 1921. They opened their inaugural season with a 2–1 road victory over the Johnson City Soldiers on May 12. Greeneville won the first half of the league's split season on the way to compiling a full season record of 58–48 (.547). In the postseason championship playoffs, the Burley Cubs lost to Johnson City, five games to one.

Greeneville ended the 1922 season last of six teams with a record of 50–70 (.417). The 1923 team improved to 51–56 (.477). From 1924 to 1925, the club was managed by former Baltimore Terrapins catcher Harvey Russell. He led the team to a third-place 54–52 (.509) finish in 1924, but they missed the playoffs having not won either half of the season. On July 15, 1925, the Bristol State Liners dropped out of the league due to financial difficulties, and the remaining three-team league disbanded the same day. The Burley Cubs lost both games of a doubleheader to the Morristown Roosters, 3–2 and 10–4, on July 15. At the time of the disbandment, Greeneville was in first place with a 28–16 (.636) record, making them the de facto pennant winners. Over five years of competition, the team's all-time record was 250–222 (.530).

=== Second stretch (1938–1942) ===
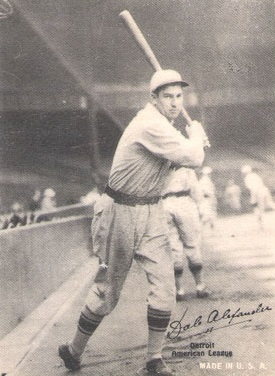
Burley Cub Dale Alexander (1923–1924, 1942) was a native of Greeneville.

The Appalachian League reorganized 12 years later in 1937 without a Greeneville team. The Burley Cubs were revived in 1938 as an affiliate of the Chicago Cubs. They won their May 12 Opening Day road game versus the Newport Canners, 9–4. They were defeated in the next day's home opener against Newport, 10–3. Greeneville ended the season in third place, qualifying for the playoffs, at 60–45 (.571). They won the semifinals, defeating the Elizabethton Betsy Red Sox, two games to none. They then won the Appalachian League championship against the Kingsport Cherokees, 3–1.

In 1939, the team became an affiliate of the Cleveland Indians. They qualified for the playoffs again with a fourth-place 65–54 (.546) finish, but were eliminated by Elizabethton in the first round, 2–1. The 1940 club, which had re-affiliated with the Chicago Cubs, qualified for the league's expanded playoffs with a fifth-place mark at 55–63 (.466). They defeated Newport, 2–1, to advance to the semifinals, where they lost to the Johnson City Cardinals, 2–1. An unaffiliated 1941 team placed fifth, missing a contracted version of the playoffs, at 43–75 (.364).

The Burly Cubs affiliated with the Boston Braves for 1942 and were managed by ex-major leaguer Dale Alexander. On June 15, standing last of six teams, Greeneville surrendered its franchise to the Appalachian League. Their 9–27 (.250) record hampered attendance, resulting in financial problems for owner Carl Lyerly. They dropped their final two games to Elizabethton, a June 12 home doubleheader, 5–0 and 9–4. Over their second five-year run, the team accumulated a record of 232–264 (.468). Combining all 10 years of competition, their all-time record was 482–486 (.498).

Greeneville did not return to professional baseball until the Greeneville Astros began competition in the Appalachian League in 2004.

== Season-by-season results ==
Season	Regular season				Postseason			MLB affiliate	Ref.
Season	Record	Win %	Finish	GB	Record	Win %	Result	MLB affiliate	Ref.
1921	58–48	.547	2nd (tie)	4 1/2	1–5	.167	Result	Won first half title Lost Appalachian League championship vs. Johnson City Soldiers, 5–1	—
1922	51–56	.477	4th	16 1/2	—	—	—	—	
1923	59–50	.541	2nd	1 1/2	—	—	—	—	
1924	54–52	.509	3rd	11	—	—	—	—	
1925	28–16	.623	1st	—	—	—	Won Appalachian League pennant	—	
1938	60–45	.571	3rd	7	5–1	.833	Won semifinals vs. Elizabethton Betsy Red Sox, 2–0; Won Appalachian League championship vs. Kingsport Cherokees, 3–1	Chicago Cubs	
1939	65–54	.546	4th	6	1–2	.333	Lost semifinals vs. Elizabethton Betsy Red Sox, 2–1	Cleveland Indians	
1940	55–63	.466	5th	29 1/2	3–3	.500	Won quarterfinals vs. Newport Canners, 2–1; Lost semifinals vs. Johnson City Cardinals, 2–1	Chicago Cubs	
1941	43–75	.364	5th	30	—	—	—	—	
1942	9–27	.250	DNF	DNF	—	—	—	Boston Braves	
Totals	482–486	.498	—	—	10–11	.476	—	—	—

== Notable players ==
Nine Burley Cubs also played in at least one game in Major League Baseball during their careers. These players and their season with Greeneville were:

- Dale Alexander (1923–1924, 1942)
- Bob Brady (1941)
- Jim Brillheart (1921)
- Buddy Crump (1923)
- Cookie Cuccurullo (1939)
- Abie Hood (1923)
- John O'Neil (1939)
- Merle Settlemire (1924)
- Frank Watt (1924)
