= Harriman Boosters =

- 1914; Harriman, Tennessee

Minor league affiliations
- Class: Class D
- League: Appalachian League

Major league affiliations
- Team: Unaffiliated

Minor league titles
- League titles (0): None

Team data
- Ballpark: Unknown

The Harriman Boosters were a Minor League Baseball team that played in the Class D Appalachian League in 1914. They were located in Harriman, Tennessee.

The Boosters won their season opener on May 18, defeating the Knoxville Reds, 6–3, at home before a crowd of about 1,000 people. They played their final game, a 3–3 tie against Knoxville called after 12 innings on account of darkness, on June 17. With the other three teams in the circuit losing money from poor attendance, the league disbanded the next day. Harriman compiled a win–loss record of 14–13 (.519), placing third, in its only season of competition.

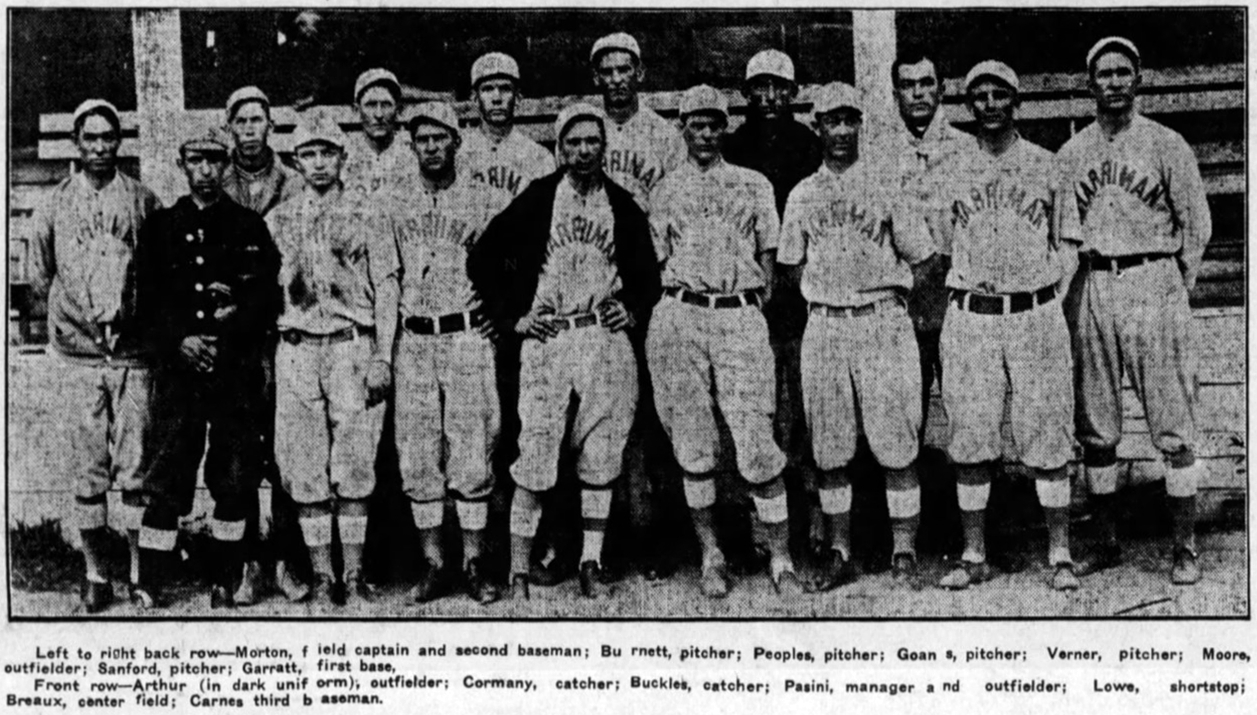
Team photograph
