= Paintsville Yankees =

- 1979–1982; (1979–1984); Based in Paintsville, Kentucky

Minor league affiliations
- Class: Rookie
- League: Appalachian League

Major league affiliations
- Previous teams: Milwaukee Brewers (1983–1984); New York Yankees (1979–1982)

Minor league titles
- League titles (4): 1979; 1980; 1981; 1983

Team data
- Name: Paintsville Brewers (1983–1984); Paintsville Yankees (1979–1982); Paintsville Highlanders (1979)
- Ballpark: Paul G. Fyffe Field

The Paintsville Yankees was the primary moniker of the minor league baseball team located in Paintsville, Kentucky, from 1978 to 1984.

== History ==
Also known as the Paintsville Brewers (1983–1984) and Paintsville Highlanders (1979), the Paintsville team was affiliated with the New York Yankees (1979–1982) and Milwaukee Brewers (1983–1984) as members of the Rookie level Appalachian League.

In the team's short history, they were Appalachian League champions from 1979 to 1981 and 1983. They came in second in 1982 and 1984. The franchise moved to Montana for the 1985 season.

Notably, Jim Morris, subject of the Disney Movie "The Rookie" made his professional debut for Paintsville in 1983. Major League All-Stars José Rijo, Ron Hansen and Dan Plesac are Paintsville alumni.

When asked about his impressions of playing in Paintsville, Morris commented: “I thought it was fantastic, it was up in the mountains. Jenny Wiley State Park was right there, which was awesome. Being from Texas, you get scrub oaks and pecan trees, but you guys had all the hills and valleys and lakes … it was incredible. We had a good time there.”

== Ballpark ==
The Paintsville teams played their home games at Johnson Central High School's Paul G. Fyffe Field, which was demolished in 2007. Paul Fyffe owned and marketed the minor league teams.

== Statistics ==
Year	Win	Loss
1979	52	13
1980	46	24
1981	46	24
1982	43	27

== Managers ==
- Ronald Mihal (1978)
- Bill Livesey (1979)
- Mike Easom (1980–1981)
- Mike Notaro (1982)
- Tom Gamboa (1983)
- Ron Hansen (1984)

== Notable alumni ==
- Mike Birkbeck (1983)
- Chris Bosio (1983)
- Glenn Braggs (1983)
- Jim Corsi (1982)
- Orestes Destrade (1981)
- Pete Filson (1979)
- Greg Gagne (1979)
- Ron Hansen(MGR, 1984) 2x MLB All-Star; 1960 AL Rookie of the Year
- Kevin Hickey (1978)
- Bill Lindsey (1981)
- Jim Morris (1983) Movie "The Rookie"
- Otis Nixon (1979)
- Ed Olwine (1980)
- Jeff Parrett (1983)
- Dan Pasqua (1982)
- Dan Plesac (1983) 3x MLB All-Star
- Eric Plunk (1982)
- José Rijo (1982) MLB All-Star; 1990 World Series MVP

== See also ==
- Category:Paintsville Yankees players
