= Maryville-Alcoa Twins =

- 1953–1954; Maryville and Alcoa, Tennessee

Minor league affiliations
- Class: Class C (1954); Class D (1953)
- League: Mountain States League (1953–1954)

Major league affiliations
- Team: Cincinnati Redlegs (1954); Unaffiliated (1953)

Minor league titles
- Pennants (1): 1953

Team data
- Name: Maryville-Alcoa Twins (1953–1954)
- Ballpark: Hunt Field (1953–1954)

The Maryville-Alcoa Twins were a Minor League Baseball team that played in the Class D/Class C Mountain States League (MSL) from 1953 to 1954. They played their home games at Hunt Field in Alcoa, Tennessee, but represented both Alcoa and nearby Maryville. Thus, the Twins were named for the twin cities. They won the MSL pennant in 1953.

== History ==
Maryville, Tennessee, briefly hosted the relocated Newport Canners of the Appalachian League in 1940. Following a season of poor attendance in Newport, Tennessee, league directors voted on July 30 to transfer the franchise to Maryville for the remainder of the season. Their games were subsequently transferred back to Newport on the week of August 11.

The Maryville-Alcoa Twins began competition in 1953 as members of the Class D Mountain States League. The team was managed by Jim Poole, a former American League first baseman. Maryville-Alcoa won their season opener against the Knoxville Smokies, 9–5, on April 25 before a home audience of around 1,000 people at Hunt Field. They ended the season in first place with a 78–46 (.629) record, capturing the MSL pennant. They then won the first round of the playoffs by defeating the Kingsport Cherokees, three games to two, but lost the league championship to Knoxville, three games to one, in the finals.

Maryville-Alcoa continued in the Mountain States League, which had been reclassified as a Class C loop, in 1954. The team gained a Major League Baseball partner, as they became an affiliate of the Cincinnati Redlegs. On June 19, the Twins' owners surrendered the franchise to the league due to financial problems. The league placed the team in Morristown, Tennessee, on June 20, where they became the Morristown Reds. The Twins were in third place with a 26–27 (.491) record, just three games out of first place, at the time of the relocation. The Morristown team withdrew from the league on July 1 due to a lack of good players and financial losses. The league ceased operations on July 20. Across both cities, the Maryville-Alcoa Twins/Morristown Reds accumulated a 29–36 (.446) record.

== Season-by-season results ==
| Season | Regular season | | | | Postseason | | | MLB affiliate | Ref. |
| Season | Record | Win % | Finish | GB | Record | Win % | Result | MLB affiliate | Ref. |
|---|---|---|---|---|---|---|---|---|---|
| 1953 | 78–46 | .629 | 1st | — | 4–5 | .444 | Result | Won MSL pennant Won semifinal vs. Kingsport Cherokees, 3–2; Lost MSL championship vs. Knoxville Smokies, 3–1 | — |
| 1954 | 26–27 | .491 | DNF | DNF | — | — | — | Cincinnati Redlegs | |
| Totals | 104–73 | .588 | — | — | 4–5 | .444 | — | — | — |

== Notable players ==
The only Twin who also played in Major League Baseball during his career was Willie Kirkland of the 1953 team, who went on to play in the majors for nine seasons.
