= Max Macon =

American baseball player, manager, coach, and scout (1915–1989)

- Pitcher / First baseman
- Born: October 14, 1915; Pensacola, Florida, U.S.
- Died: August 5, 1989 (aged 73); Jupiter, Florida, U.S.
- Batted: Left Threw: Left

MLB debut
- April 21, 1938, for the St. Louis Cardinals

Last MLB appearance
- April 17, 1947, for the Boston Braves

MLB statistics
- Win–loss record: 17–19
- Earned run average: 4.24
- Batting average: .265
- Stats at Baseball Reference

Teams
- St. Louis Cardinals (1938); Brooklyn Dodgers (1940, 1942–1943); Boston Braves (1944, 1947)

Max Cullen Macon (October 14, 1915 – August 5, 1989) was an American Major League Baseball player, a minor league player-manager and pitching coach, and a professional baseball scout. Born in Pensacola, Florida, he threw and batted left-handed, stood 6 feet 3 inches (1.91 m) tall and weighed 175 pounds (79 kg). His professional playing career lasted for 19 seasons between 1934 and 1955.

== Career ==
Macon was primarily a pitcher but also played first base and the outfield during his MLB career, which spanned 1938–1947. Of his 226 total big-league games played, he was a pitcher in 81 games (29 as a starter), a first baseman in 75, and an outfielder in 23. He was a pinch hitter or pinch runner in the balance of his appearances.

Macon's most extensive playing time was with the 1944 Boston Braves, when he got into 106 games (only one as a pitcher), hit all three of his MLB home runs and collected 36 of his 46 career runs batted in. He missed the 1945 season while serving in the United States Army during World War II; during his service, Macon was hospitalized for 29 days after being injured in a dynamite explosion at Fort McClellan in Alabama. He was out of baseball in 1946, then returned to Boston to finish his major league career in 1947.

As a pitcher, Macon posted a career 17–19 win–loss record and a 4.24 earned run average, with nine complete games, two shutouts, and three saves; in 2971/3 innings pitched, he permitted 307 hits and 128 bases on balls, while registering 90 strikeouts. On offense, Macon collected 133 hits, which included 17 doubles and four triples, along with his three homers. He batted .265.

Starting in 1949, Macon managed in the minor leagues for 12 seasons, including six years at the Triple-A level in the Dodgers' organization. In 1961, he became a scout and minor league pitching coach for the Detroit Tigers, with whom he remained until 1968, when he was named Southeast regional scouting supervisor for the Pittsburgh Pirates. During these years, Macon supplemented his earnings as a college basketball referee, with both the SEC and MVC.

In 2001, Minor League Baseball published a list of its 100 greatest teams of all time, which included two managed by Macon: the 1951 Hazard Bombers (at number 81) and the 1952 Miami Sun Sox (at number 40).
