= Walt Dixon =

American minor league baseball player, coach, and manager

Walter Edward Dixon (November 25, 1920 – September 25, 2003) was an American pitcher, outfielder, first baseman, coach and manager in minor league baseball. He threw and batted right-handed, stood 6 ft 1 1/2 in (1.87 m) (187 cm) tall and weighed 185 pounds (84 kg). He was a native of Chatham County, North Carolina.

Dixon attended the College of William and Mary before signing with the Boston Red Sox farm system in 1940 as a right-handed pitcher. Despite losing three seasons (1943–45) to military service during World War II, Dixon progressed as far as the Scranton Red Sox of the Class A Eastern League before his release by the Red Sox at the end of the 1946 campaign. When he returned to the game in 1947 he pitched for unaffiliated clubs in the mid-minors until he became predominantly an outfielder and first baseman in 1949. That season — also his first as a manager — Dixon batted .368 for the Shelby Farmers of the Class D Western Carolina League. His best minor league season, however, would come in 1953 when, as the manager and first baseman of the Norton Braves of the Class D Mountain States League, he led the loop in home runs (37) and hits (194), while batting .415 and driving home 162 RBI. Incredibly, Dixon did not lead the MSL in RBI or batting, finishing behind Willie Kirkland (164 RBI) and Leo "Muscle" Shoals (.427).

In 1956, Dixon began a 20-year-long tenure with the Chicago Cubs as a manager in their farm system. Apart from three separate stints in the Double A Texas League, Dixon usually managed in the lower minor leagues. Dixon also served as a member of the Cubs' College of Coaches in 1964 and 1965 (concurrently, he managed the Class A St. Cloud Rox and Quincy Cubs, respectively) and scouted for the club. During the 1980s, Dixon also served as an area scout for the New York Yankees based in Florence, South Carolina.

He compiled a 27-year managing record of 1,484 wins and 1,521 defeats (.484). As a minor league hitter, however, Dixon's numbers were far more formidable: a career batting average of .324 in 1,237 games, with 1,273 hits and 208 home runs, even though he was a full-time position player for only 10 1/2 seasons.

Dixon died in Florence at the age of 82.

== See also ==
- College of Coaches
