= Harlan Smokies =

Defunct minor league baseball team in Kentucky

- (1948–1954, 1961–1963, 1965); Harlan, Kentucky

Minor league affiliations
- Class: Rookie (1963, 1965); Class D (1961–1962); Class C (1954); Class D (1948–1953)
- League: Appalachian League (1961–1963, 1965); Mountain States League (1948–1954)

Major league affiliations
- Team: Boston Red Sox (1965); New York Yankees (1961–1963); Chicago White Sox (1961–1962); Boston Braves (1952)

Minor league titles
- League titles: 1949, 1950, 1952

Team data
- Name: Harlan Red Sox (1965); Harlan Yankees (1963); Harlan Smokies (1948–1954, 1961–1962)
- Ballpark: Browning-Leonard Park

Harlan Smokies was the primary name of a Minor League Baseball team based in Harlan, Kentucky. The team competed for a total of 11 seasons during 1948–1965, first in the Mountain States League and later in the Appalachian League. The team was known as the Harlan Yankees in 1963 and Harlan Red Sox in 1965, due to affiliations with the New York Yankees and Boston Red Sox of Major League Baseball (MLB).

The Smokies qualified for the Mountain States League postseason in four consecutive seasons, 1949–1952, and were league champions in three of those years (1949, 1950, and 1952).

== Notable players ==
Multiple players with Harlan also made appearances in MLB:

- 1948: —
- 1949: —
- 1950: Roger McCardell
- 1951: —
- 1952: —
- 1953: Cliff Melton
- 1954: —
- 1961: Cisco Carlos, Mike DeGerick, Art López, Luis Peraza, Mel Stottlemyre
- 1962: Fred Klages, Dave McDonald, Denny McLain, John Miller, Billy Murphy, Cecil Perkins, Jim Shellenback
- 1963: Mike Jurewicz, Jim Ollom, Fritz Peterson, Dale Roberts, Charlie Vinson
- 1965: Ray Jarvis, Bobby Mitchell, Amos Otis

== Results by season ==
Season	Nickname	Affiliation	Record (win %)	Finish	Manager	Playoffs (games)	Attendance	Ref.
1948	Smokies	—	56–63 (.471)	5th of 6	Bill Sisler; Frank Wilson; Michael Goda	did not qualify	46,187	
1949	Smokies	—	83–41 (.669)	1st of 8	George Motto	defeated Middlesboro Athletics (3–1) defeated Morristown Red Sox (3–2)	49,615	
1950	Smokies	—	81–44 (.648)	1st of 8	Rex Carr	defeated Big Stone Gap Rebels (3–1) defeated Middlesboro Athletics (3–0)	41,707	
1951	Smokies	—	82–43 (.656)	3rd of 8	Bones Sanders; John Streza	lost to Hazard Bombers (0–3)	35,657	
1952	Smokies	Boston Braves	73–45 (.619)	2nd of 6	Rex Carr	defeated Big Stone Gap Rebels (3–2) defeated Morristown Red Sox (3–0)	32,579	
1953	Smokies	—	53–72 (.424)	7th of 8	Cliff Melton; Barry Cox; James Grigg	did not qualify	20,630	
1954	Smokies	—	39–33 (.542)	2nd of 6	Bill Steinecke	†	unknown	
1961	Smokies	Chicago White Sox & New York Yankees	35–34 (.507)	3rd of 8	Frank Parenti; Ed Lyons	none held	19,466	
1962	Smokies	Chicago White Sox & New York Yankees	25–45 (.357)	6th of 6	Chips Sobek; Lamar North	none held	16,056	
1963	Yankees	New York Yankees	28–39 (.418)	6th of 6	Gary Blaylock	none held	13,134	
1965	Red Sox	Boston Red Sox	33–37 (.471)	4th of 6	Rac Slider	none held	23,190	

† In 1954, the Mountain States League disbanded in July, thus no playoffs were held.
