= Mountain States League (1948–1954) =

Baseball league

- Most recent season or competition: 1954 Mountain States League season
- Classification: Class D (1948–1953); Class C (1954)
- Sport: Baseball
- First season: 1948
- Folded: July 20, 1954
- President: Virgil Q. Wacks (1948–1954)
- No. of teams: 13
- Country: United States of America
- Most titles: 2 Harlan Smokies; Hazard Bombers
- Related competitions: Mountain States League (1911–12)

The Mountain States League was a Class D and Class C minor league baseball league which operated in the United States from 1948 to 1954. The league was a Class D level league, becoming a Class C league during its final season in 1954. The league disbanded on July 20, 1954. The cities of Harlan, Kentucky, and Morristown, Tennessee, were represented for the full seven–year existence of the circuit.

== History ==
A total of 16 teams competed in the Mountain States League. In 1954, the Morristown Red Sox team disbanded on May 15, and was replaced when the Maryville-Alcoa Twins moved to Morristown on June 19. Both the Morristown Twins and Lexington Colts disbanded on July 7.

Virgil Q. Wacks served as president for the duration of the league.

== Cities represented ==
- Big Stone Gap, VA: Big Stone Gap Rebels 1949–1953
- Harlan, KY: Harlan Smokies 1948–1954
- Hazard, KY: Hazard Bombers 1948–1952
- Jenkins, KY: Jenkins Cavaliers 1948–1951
- Kingsport, TN: Kingsport Cherokees 1953–1954
- Knoxville, TN: Knoxville Smokies 1953
- Lexington, KY: Lexington Colts 1954
- Maryville, TN & Alcoa, TN: Maryville-Alcoa Twins 1953–1954
- Middlesboro, KY: Middlesboro Athletics 1949–1954
- Morristown, TN: Morristown Red Sox 1948–1954; Morristown Twins 1954
- Newport, TN: Newport Canners 1948–1950
- Norton, VA: Norton Braves 1951–1953
- Oak Ridge, TN: Oak Ridge Bombers 1948; Oak Ridge Pioneers 1954
- Pennington Gap, VA: Pennington Gap Miners 1948–1951

== Standings & statistics ==
1948 Mountain States League - schedule

Team standings	W	L	PCT	GB	Attend	Managers
Morristown Red Sox	70	46	.603	–	37,744	James Grigg
Oak Ridge Bombers / Hazard Bombers	65	43	.602	4	22,533	Hobe Brummitt
Pennington Gap Miners	59	54	.522	9½	14,988	Joe Santomauro / Buford Rhea
Newport Canners	58	59	.496	12½	30,054	Michael Balla / Cy Whaley
Harlan Smokies	56	63	.471	15½	46,187	Bill Sisler / Frank Wilson / Michael Goda
Jenkins Cavaliers	35	78	.310	33½	23,276	Ray Russell / Jackson Bell / Brent Mays

Oak Ridge moved to Hazard June 10
Playoffs: Morristown 3 games, Newport 2; Hazard 3 games, Pennington Gap 0.
Finals: Morristown 3 games, Hazard 2.

Player statistics
Player	Team	Stat	Tot	Player	Team	Stat	Tot
Cy Whaley	Newport	BA	.382	Mike Clark	Newport	W	20
Eduardo DeHogues	Morristown	Runs	109	Dennis Reeder	Oak Ridge/Hazard	SO	196
Eduardo DeHogues	Morristown	Hits	145	Dennis Reeder	Oak Ridge/Hazard	ERA	2.20
Jacob Stirn	Morristown	RBI	101	Dennis Reeder	Oak Ridge/Hazard	PCT	.773 17–5
Jacob Stirn	Morristown	HR	12				
Eduardo DeHogues	Morristown	HR	12				

1949 Mountain States League - schedule

Team standings	W	L	PCT	GB	Attend	Managers
Harlan Smokies	83	41	.669	–	49,615	George Motto
Morristown Red Sox	72	52	.581	11	44,362	James Grigg
Middlesboro Athletics	69	56	.552	14½	25,833	Hobe Brummitt / Ted Russ / James Burns
Jenkins Cavaliers	63	61	.508	20	19,654	Joe Vitter
Pennington Gap Miners	62	63	.496	21½	14,820	Lew Flick / Burgess Wolfenbarger
Newport Canners	59	66	.472	24½	14,148	Cy Whaley
Big Stone Gap Rebels	55	70	.440	28½	37,751	Rudolph Parsons / Dale Markert / Fred Marsh
Hazard Bombers	35	89	.282	48	23,543	Fred Marsh / George Mitrus / Hobe Brummitt

Playoffs: Harlan 3 games, Middlesboro 1; Morristown 3 games, Jenkins 2.
Finals: Harlan 3 games, Morristown 2.

Player statistics
Player	Team	Stat	Tot	Player	Team	Stat	Tot
Kelly Lunn	Pennington Gap	BA	.358	Frank C. Wilson	Harlan	W	27
Robert Grose	Pennington Gap	Runs	127	Frank C. Wilson	Harlan	SO	176
Kelly Lunn	Pennington Gap	Hits	179	Frank C. Wilson	Harlan	ERA	2.77
Kelly Lunn	Pennington Gap	RBI	126	Frank C. Wilson	Harlan	PCT	.771 27–8
Jack Hall	Jenkins	HR	18				

1950 Mountain States League - schedule

Team standings	W	L	PCT	GB	Attend	Managers
Harlan Smokies	81	44	.648	–	41,707	Rex Carr
Hazard Bombers	76	49	.608	5	55,184	Max Macon
Big Stone Gap Rebels	75	51	.595	6½	38,878	Jack Rothrock
Middlesboro Athletics	59	67	.468	22½	20,248	James Burns
Jenkins Cavaliers	58	66	.468	22½	13,880	Bob Bowman / Wayne Stewart / Bill Scopetone
Morristown Red Sox	56	67	.455	24	30,448	Fred Hartman / Pinky Doyle
Newport Canners	51	74	.408	30	20,920	Robert Mitchell / Matthew Zidich
Pennington Gap Miners	44	82	.349	37½	11,164	Lew Flick / Michael Brelich / Vince Pankovits

Playoffs: Harlan 3 games, Big Stone Gap 1; Middlesboro 3 games, Hazard 0.
Finals: Harlan 3 games, Middlesboro 0.

Player statistics
Player	Team	Stat	Tot	Player	Team	Stat	Tot
Max Macon	Hazard	BA	.392	Nick Bunato	Middlesboro	W	22
Joseph Christian	Harlan	Runs	127	Nick Bunato	Middlesboro	SO	132
Joseph Christian	Harlan	Hits	173	Michael Hudak	Big Stone Gap	ERA	2.89
Joe Riola	Morristown	RBI	130	Michael Hudak	Big Stone Gap	PCT	.875 21–3
Joseph Christian	Harlan	HR	27				

1951 Mountain States League - schedule

Team standings	W	L	PCT	GB	Attend	Managers
Hazard Bombers	93	33	.738	–	35,129	Max Macon
Morristown Red Sox	86	39	.688	6½	22,184	James Burns
Harlan Smokies	82	43	.656	10½	35,657	Bones Sanders / John Streza
Middlesboro Athletics	59	66	.472	33½	19,228	Ted Russ / George Kennis
Pennington Gap Miners	54	71	.432	38½	14,994	Vince Pankovits
Norton Braves	53	72	.424	39½	12,314	Bob Bowman / George Sifft / George Motto
Big Stone Gap Rebels	49	75	.395	43	13,737	Ham Schulte / Lew Flick
Jenkins Cavaliers	24	101	.192	68½	12,250	James Grigg / Tom McBride

Playoffs: Hazard 3 games, Harlan 0; Morristown 3 games, Middlesboro 0.
Finals: Hazard 3 games, Morristown 0.

Player statistics
Player	Team	Stat	Tot	Player	Team	Stat	Tot
Orville Kitts	Morristown	BA	.424	Dan Hayling	Hazard	W	24
Max Macon	Hazard	Runs	139	Johnny Podres	Hazard	SO	228
Len Feriancek	Pennington Gap	Hits	216	Johnny Podres	Hazard	ERA	1.67
Max Macon	Hazard	RBI	148	Johnny Podres	Hazard	PCT	.875 21–3
Bill Halstead	Pennington Gap	HR	34				

1952 Mountain States League' - schedule

Team standings	W	L	PCT	GB	Attend	Managers
Hazard Bombers	87	32	.731	–	14,600	Mervin Dornburg
Harlan Smokies	73	45	.619	13½	32,579	Rex Carr
Morristown Red Sox	61	58	.513	26	10,597	James Burns
Big Stone Gap Rebels	57	60	.487	29	11,161	Len Cross
Middlesboro Athletics	47	72	.395	40	15,364	Leon Culberson / Red Goff / Joe McManus
Norton Braves	30	88	.254	56½	10,025	George Motto / Bill Fitchko / Mark Muslin

Playoffs: Morristown 3 games, Hazard 1; Harlan 3 games, Big Stone Gap 2.
Finals: Harlan 3 games, Morristown 0.

Player statistics
Player	Team	Stat	Tot	Player	Team	Stat	Tot
Orville Kitts	Morristown	BA	.372	Michael DelPiano	Harlan	W	22
Ken Johnson	Hazard	Runs	146	Michael DelPiano	Harlan	SO	144
Len Cross	Big Stone Gap	Hits	138	Rafael Codinachs	Middlesboro	ERA	2.78
Joe McManus	Middlesboro	Hits	138	McKinley Mosley	Hazard	PCT	1.000 10–0
Len Cross	Big Stone Gap	RBI	125	Ken Johnson	Hazard	BB	197
Len Cross	Big Stone Gap	HR	40				

1953 Mountain States League - schedule

Team standings	W	L	PCT	GB	Attend	Managers
Maryville-Alcoa Twins	78	46	.629	–	25,000	Jim Poole
Knoxville Smokies	70	55	.560	8½	36,255	Vince Pankovits
Kingsport Cherokees	69	56	.552	9½	46,717	Muscle Shoals
Morristown Red Sox	64	62	.508	15	37,384	Napoleon Reyes
Norton Braves	63	63	.500	16	21,873	Walt Dixon
Big Stone Gap Rebels	55	70	.440	23½	8,230	Kelly Lunn
Harlan Smokies	53	72	.424	25½	20,630	Cliff Melton / Barry Cox / James Grigg
Middlesboro Athletics	48	76	.387	30	12,600	Julian Morgan / Ben Pardue

Playoffs: Maryville-Alcoa 3 games, Kingsport 2; Knoxville 3 games, Morristown 1.
Finals: Knoxville 3 games, Maryville-Alcoa 1.

Player statistics
Player	Team	Stat	Tot	Player	Team	Stat	Tot
Muscle Shoals	Kingsport	BA	.427	Jim Tugerson	Knoxville	W	29
Hugh Hamil	Maryville-Alcoa	Runs	165	Jim Tugerson	Knoxville	SO	286
Walt Dixon	Norton	Hits	197	Raymond Johnston	Maryville-Alcoa	ERA	1.90
Willie Kirkland	Maryville-Alcoa	RBI	164	Ned Jilton	Kingsport	PCT	.864 19–3
Walt Dixon	Norton	HR	37				

1954 Mountain States League - schedule

Team standings	W	L	PCT	GB	Attend	Managers
Middlesboro Athletics	48	34	.585	–	9,031	Walt Dixon
Harlan Smokies	39	33	.542	4	10,000	Bill Steinecke
Kingsport Cherokees	41	40	.506	6½	33,000	Muscle Shoals
Oak Ridge Pioneers	35	43	.449	11	18,286	Bert Niehoff
Morristown Red Sox	7	7	.500	NA	NA	Napoleon Reyes
Lexington Colts	30	36	.455	NA	4,000	Zeke Bonura
Maryville-Alcoa Twins / Morristown Twins	29	36	.446	NA	9,559	Tuck McWilliams

Morristown disbanded May 15; Maryville–Alcoa moved to Morristown June 19, then disbanded July 7; Lexington disbanded July 20.
The league disbanded July 20.

Player statistics
Player	Team	Stat	Tot	Player	Team	Stat	Tot
Ray Adams	Oak Ridge	BA	.352	Norman Hughes	Harlan	W	16
Aldo Salvent	Kingsport	Runs	84	Norman Hughes	Harlan	SO	85
Ray Adams	Oak Ridge	Hits	112	Raymond Johnston	Oak Ridge	ERA	2.28
Walt Dixon	Middlesboro	RBI	80	Don Vaughn	Maryville–Alcoa/Morristown	PCT	.917 11–1
Muscle Shoals	Kingsport	HR	18				
