= Bob Bowman (pitcher) =

American baseball player (1910–1972)

- Pitcher
- Born: October 3, 1910; Keystone, West Virginia, U.S.
- Died: September 4, 1972 (aged 61); Bluefield, West Virginia, U.S.
- Batted: Right Threw: Right

MLB debut
- April 21, 1939, for the St. Louis Cardinals

Last MLB appearance
- May 25, 1942, for the Chicago Cubs

MLB statistics
- Win–loss record: 26–17
- Earned run average: 3.82
- Strikeouts: 146
- Stats at Baseball Reference

Teams
- St. Louis Cardinals (1939–1940); New York Giants (1941); Chicago Cubs (1942)

Robert James Bowman (October 3, 1910 – September 4, 1972) was an American professional baseball player. The native of Keystone, West Virginia, a right-handed pitcher, played all or portions of four Major League Baseball seasons (1939–1942) as a member of the St. Louis Cardinals, New York Giants and Chicago Cubs. For his career, he compiled a 26–17 record in 109 appearances, 71 of them as a relief pitcher, with nine saves, 13 complete games, two shutouts, a 3.82 earned run average and 146 strikeouts in 365 innings pitched. He allowed 360 hits and 139 bases on balls.

Bowman is most noted as being the pitcher who in June 1940 beaned former Cardinal teammate Joe Medwick, an incident that nearly cost Medwick his life.

== Baseball career ==
During his active career, Bowman was listed as 5 feet 10 inches (1.78 m) tall and 160 pounds (73 kg). He entered the professional ranks in 1929 at age 18 in the minor leagues, but then dropped out of Organized Baseball for seven out of the next eight seasons (1930–1933, 1935–1937) — playing semi-professionally and working as a coal miner. Finally, in 1938, at age 27, he signed as a free agent with the Cardinals' organization. After winning 11 of 18 decisions for top-level Rochester of the International League that season, he made the 1939 MLB Cardinals the following spring. Bowman then enjoyed a stellar rookie campaign: 51 games pitched, 13 wins against only five defeats, four complete games in 15 starts and two shutouts. His eight saves (in 36 relief appearances) and sparkling 2.60 ERA were both second in the National League. It was the high point of Bowman's major-league career. In 1940, he started the year slowly, but had improved his won–lost mark to 2–3 with a 3.16 ERA in 12 games through June 14.

Then, on Tuesday, June 18, against the Brooklyn Dodgers at Ebbets Field, Bowman received only his second starting assignment of the year. Six days before, the pennant-contending Dodgers had acquired veteran slugger Medwick from the Cardinals in a block-buster trade. In the first inning, Bowman yielded three hits and two runs to Brooklyn's first three hitters. Then, facing cleanup hitter Medwick, he threw an inside fastball that struck Medwick in the head and knocked him unconscious. A wild on-field brawl ensued, with the Dodgers believing that Bowman had intentionally hit Medwick after the two (and Dodgers' player-manager Leo Durocher) had briefly argued in a hotel elevator before the game. Brooklyn's 50-year-old club president, Larry MacPhail, ran onto the field and joined the melee, trying to retaliate against Bowman. The pitcher left the game and the park under a police escort, and an inquiry by the Kings County district attorney found no evidence of criminal intent. However, on the field, his poor outing saw Bowman charged with four earned runs without retiring a man, ballooning his ERA almost a full point to 4.01, although he was spared the loss when St. Louis battled back to win the contest, 7–5.

Medwick missed four games, and Bowman appeared in 14 more games over the course of 1940, including an incident-free July 26 outing against Brooklyn. But his statistics reflected diminished effectiveness: a 7–5 record, but a mediocre 4.33 ERA in 28 games and 1141/3 innings pitched—a workload of 55 fewer frames compared to his 1939 rookie season. That December, the Cardinals sold Bowman's contract to the New York Giants, where his performance declined even further in 1941 (6–7, with a 5.71 ERA in 29 games and 801/3 innings pitched). The Giants traded Bowman to the Cubs on December 3, 1941, but Chicago used him in only one inning in one game, and sent him to the minors. His pitching career continued into 1950, with his final five seasons spent at the Class D level with teams in North Carolina and his native West Virginia.

He died in Bluefield on September 4, 1972, at age 61.

== See also ==
- List of Major League Baseball annual saves leaders
