= Pennington Gap Miners =

- 1937–1951; (1937–1940, 1948–1951); Pennington Gap, Virginia

Minor league affiliations
- Class: Class D (1937–1940, 1948–1951)
- League: Appalachian League (1937–1940); Mountain States League (1948–1951)

Major league affiliations
- Team: St. Louis Browns (1938–1940)

Minor league titles
- League titles (1): 1937
- Wild card berths (3): 1937; 1938; 1948

Team data
- Name: Pennington Gap Lee Bears (1937–1938); Pennington Gap Bears (1939); Pennington Gap Miners (1940, 1948–1951)
- Ballpark: Leeman Field (1937–1940, 1948–1951)

The Pennington Gap Miners were minor league baseball team based in Pennington Gap, Virginia. Between 1937 and 1951, Pennington Gap teams played as members of the Class D level Appalachian League from 1937 to 1940 and Mountain States League from 1948 to 1951, winning the 1937 league championship. The team was initially called the "Bears."

Pennington Gap was a minor league affiliate of the St. Louis Browns from 1938 to 1940.

Pennington Gap teams hosted home minor league games at Leeman Field.

== History ==
Minor league baseball began in Pennington Gap, Virginia, when the 1937 Pennington Gap Lee Bears joined the four–team Appalachian League, which was reformed after a 12–year hiatus. The 1937 Pennington Gap Lee Bears finished the regular season with a 49–55 record, placing third in the standings with league members Elizabethton Betsy Red Sox (57–45), Johnson City Soldiers (52–51) and Newport Canners (49–56).

The Pennington Gap Lee Bears won the 1937 Appalachian League Championship. In the 1937 playoffs, the Pennington Gap Lee Bears defeated the Elizabethton Betsy Red Sox 3 games to 2 to capture the championship.

Playing as an affiliate of the St. Louis Browns, the 1938 Pennington Gap Lee Bears placed fourth in the six–team league. The Bears finished with a 46–60 record in the regular season standings and qualified for the playoffs, as the Appalachian League expanded to six teams. In the playoffs, the Kingsport Cherokees defeated the Pennington Gap Lee Bears 2 games to 0.

The 1939 Pennington Gap Bears remained as a St. Louis Browns affiliate. The team finished the regular season with a record of 52–66, placing fifth in the Appalachian League regular season standings, missing the playoffs.

In 1940, the renamed Pennington Gap Miners finished seventh in the league standings. With a 50–64 record, the Miners missed the playoffs, playing as an affiliate of the St. Louis Browns. The team drew 22,330, an average of 392. Pennington Gap folded following the 1940 season.

In 1948, the Mountain States League reformed, having last played in 1912. The Pennington Gap Miners joined the league. The 1948 Miners finished 59–54 (third) in the Mountain States League regular season, with the Harlan Smokies (56–63), Jenkins Cavaliers (35–78), Morristown Red Sox (70–46), Newport Canners (58–59) and Oak Ridge Bombers (65–43). In the 1948 playoffs, the Hazard Bombers defeated the Pennington Gap Miners 3 games to 0. Pennington Gap's season attendance was 14,988, an average of 265, last in the league.

The Pennington Gap Miners finished 62–63, placing fifth in 1949 and 44–82 to place eighth and last in 1950, missing the playoffs in both seasons. The 1950 team finished last in attendance, with 11,164.

The 1951 season was the last for the Pennington Gap Miners. The Miners finished 54–71 to place fifth in the Mountain States League regular season standings and did not qualify for the four-team playoffs. Their season attendance at Leeman Field was 14,994.

The Pennington Gap Miners folded from the Mountain States League after the 1951 season, as did the Jenkins Cavaliers. Pennington Gap has not hosted another minor league team.

== The ballpark ==
Pennington Gap teams played minor league home games at Leeman Field. The ballpark site today is called "Leeman Field Park" and still contains baseball fields. The ballpark is located at 605 Old Zion Road in Pennington Gap, Virginia.

== Timeline ==
Year(s)	# Yrs.	Team	Level	League	Affiliate	Ballpark
1937	1	Pennington Gap Lee Bears	Class D	Appalachian League	None	Leeman Field
1938	1	Pennington Gap Lee Bears	Class D	Appalachian League	St. Louis Browns	Leeman Field
1939	1	Pennington Gap Bears	Class D	Appalachian League	St. Louis Browns	Leeman Field
1940	1	Pennington Gap Miners	Class D	Appalachian League	St. Louis Browns	Leeman Field
1948–1951	4	Pennington Gap Miners	Class D	Mountain States League	None	Leeman Field

== Notable alumni ==
- Lew Flick (1949–1950, MGR)
- Arthur Hauger (1939–1940, MGR)
- Charlie Metro (1938)
- Pennington Gap Miners players
