= Newport Canners =

- 1937–1950; (1937–1942, 1948–1950); Newport, Tennessee

Minor league affiliations
- Class: Class D (1937–1942, 1948–1950)
- League: Mountain States League (1948–1950); Appalachian League (1937–1942)

Major league affiliations
- Team: Washington Senators (1940, 1942); New York Yankees (1939)

Minor league titles
- League titles (0): None

Team data
- Name: Newport Canners (1937–1942, 1948–1950)
- Ballpark: City Memorial Park (1937–1942, 1948–1950)

The Newport Canners were a Minor League Baseball team that played in the Class D Appalachian League from 1937 to 1942 and the Mountain States League from 1948 to 1950. They were located in Newport, Tennessee, and played their home games at City Memorial Park. The team's games were temporarily transferred to Maryville, Tennessee, for approximately two weeks late in the 1940 season.

The Canners were unaffiliated with a Major League Baseball team during six of their nine seasons but had affiliations with the New York Yankees in 1939 and the Washington Senators in 1940 and 1942. Over all nine seasons of competition, their all-time regular season win–loss record was 426–553 (.435).

== History ==
=== First stretch (1937–1942) ===
The Canners became the first professional baseball team to hail from Newport, Tennessee, when they joined the Class D Appalachian League in 1937. The team was named for the nearby Stokely Brothers cannery. They opened their inaugural season with a 17–10 road victory over the Pennington Gap Lee Bears on May 22. Their first home game was played at the new City Memorial Park on May 26. The home team outscored Pennington Gap, 20–6. Despite a good start to the season, Newport failed to win either half of the league's split schedule with a record of 49–56 (.467), placing last of four teams. The next two seasons were the two lowest in franchise history. The 1938 Canners posted a fifth-place 42–66 (.389) record, while the 1939 club finished last of six teams at 30–89 (.252) as an affiliate of the New York Yankees.

In 1940, Newport entered into an affiliation with the Washington Senators. Following a season of poor attendance, league directors voted on July 30 to transfer the franchise to Maryville, Tennessee, for the remainder of the season. Their games were subsequently transferred back to Newport on the week of August 11. The Newport/Maryville team compiled a 56–63 (.471) record and earned a spot in the postseason playoffs, but they lost to the Greeneville Burley Cubs in the opening round, two games to one.

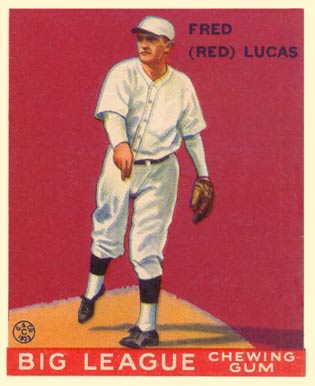
Red Lucas was player-manager of the 1942 team.

Returning permanently to Newport as an unaffiliated team in 1941, the Canners finished with a franchise-best 66–52 (.559) mark, again qualifying for the playoffs. Newport was eliminated in the semifinals by the Elizabethton Betsy Red Sox, 3–2. The Canners reaffiliated with Washington for the 1942 season. On June 14, Greeneville surrendered its franchise to the league due to poor attendance, and league directors subsequently voted to drop Newport due to its distance from the remaining clubs and so as to maintain an even four-team league. The club maintained their expulsion was against the league's constitution, and remained in the circuit until being forced out on June 26. Their final game that day was a 12–0 home loss to the Union City Dodgers. Their season record was 19–28 (.404). Over six years of competition in the Appalachian League, the Canners accumulated a 258–354 (.422) record. The city did not field another team from 1943 to 1947.

=== Second stretch (1948–1950) ===
In 1948, the Newport Canners were revived as members of the Class D Mountain States League. Their first game was a 6–4 loss to the Morristown Red Sox on the road on May 1. They ended the season in fourth place with a 58–59 (.496) record and qualified for the playoffs. Newport was eliminated by Morristown, 3–2, in the semifinals. The 1949 team placed sixth of eight teams with a 59–66 (.472) season.

Canners right-hander Jose Aguiar pitched two no-hitters in 1950. The first occurred on June 23 against the Big Stone Gap Rebels, a 7–0 win in the second game of a seven-inning doubleheader. He tossed a second no-hit game on August 19, beating Morristown 9–0 in the first game of a doubleheader. The Canners ended the season in seventh place at 51–74 (.408). Through three years in the Mountain States League, Newport accumulated a 168–199 (.458) record. Over all nine seasons of competition, their all-time regular season win–loss record was 426–553 (.435).

== Season-by-season results ==
Season	Regular season				Postseason			MLB affiliate	Ref.
Season	Record	Win %	Finish	GB	Record	Win %	Result	MLB affiliate	Ref.
1937	49–56	.467	4th	9 1/2	—	—	Result	—	—
1938	42–66	.389	5th	26 1/2	—	—	—	—	
1939	30–89	.252	6th	41	—	—	—	New York Yankees	
1940	56–63	.471	4th	29	1–2	.333	Lost quarterfinals vs. Greeneville Burley Cubs, 2–1	Washington Senators	
1941	62–52	.559	3rd	9	2–3	.400	Lost semifinals vs. Elizabethton Betsy Red Sox, 3–2	—	
1942	19–28	.404	DNF	DNF	—	—	—	Washington Senators	
1948	58–59	.496	4th	12 1/2	2–3	.400	Lost semifinals vs. Morristown Red Sox, 3–2	—	
1949	59–66	.472	6th	24 1/2	—	—	—	—	
1950	51–74	.408	7th	30	—	—	—	—	
Totals	426–553	.435	—	—	5–8	.385	—	—	—

== Notable players ==
Eight Canners also played in at least one game in Major League Baseball during their careers. These players and their seasons with Newport were:

- Ed Butka (1940)
- Rod Graber (1948)
- Red Lucas (1942)
- Red Marion (1940–1941)
- Jack Merson (1940)
- Al Kvasnak (1941)
- Art Ruble (1939)
- Tom Saffell (1941)
