= Appalachian League =

US collegiate summer baseball league

- Current season, competition or edition: 2026 Appalachian League season
- Classification: Collegiate summer (2021–present); Rookie (1963–2020); Class D (1911–1914, 1921–1925, 1937–1955, 1957–1962)
- Sport: Baseball
- Founded: 1911
- President: Dan Moushon
- No. of teams: 8 (2026 season)
- Country: United States
- Most recent champion: Kingsport Axmen (2026)
- Most titles: Bluefield Blue Jays (14)
- Streaming partner: AWRE Sports
- Website: appyleague.com

The Appalachian League is a collegiate summer baseball league that operates in the Appalachian regions of Tennessee, Virginia, West Virginia, and North Carolina. Designed for rising freshmen and sophomores using wooden bats, its season runs from June through August. The league is part of Major League Baseball and USA Baseball's Prospect Development Pipeline.

Between 1911 and 2020, the Appalachian League operated as part of Minor League Baseball and various of its teams were low-level affiliates of Major League Baseball franchises. It operated as a Class D league during four stints through 1962, then was classified as a Rookie Advanced league from 1963 to 2020.

== History ==
The original Appalachian League existed for four seasons from 1911 to 1914 and was classified as a Class D circuit. All teams were independent with no Major League Baseball (MLB) affiliation in the era. The charter Appalachian League teams were the Asheville Moonshiners, Bristol Boosters, Cleveland Counts, Johnson City Soldiers, Knoxville Appalachians, and Morristown Jobbers, playing in the inaugural season. After a six-year absence, the league reorganized for five seasons from 1921 to 1925, and, as before, it consisted entirely of independent teams at the Class D level. Following an 11-year period of inactivity, the third iteration of the Class D Appalachian League played from 1937 to 1955. The league went dormant in 1956, but was revived in 1957.

Along with a reorganization of Minor League Baseball in 1963, the Appalachian League reformed and was classified as a Rookie-level league. In its final years as an MLB-affiliated league, the Appalachian League was one of two "Rookie Advanced" minor leagues along with the Pioneer League. As such, it occupied the second-lowest rung in the minor league ladder. Although classified as a Rookie league, the level of play was slightly higher than that of the two "complex" Rookie leagues, the Gulf Coast League and Arizona League. Unlike the complex leagues, Appalachian League teams charged admission and sold concessions. It was almost exclusively the first fully professional league in which many players competed; most of the players had just been signed out of high school and were further along in their development than players in the "complex" leagues. It was a short-season league that competed from late June (when major league teams signed players whom they selected in the amateur draft) to early September.

It continued to operate as a Rookie Advanced league through 2020, with the start of the 2020 season postponed due to the COVID-19 pandemic before ultimately being cancelled. Thus, 2019 was the Appalachian League's last season of operation within Minor League Baseball, with the Johnson City Cardinals winning the league championship. Entering the 2021 Major League Baseball season, MLB stated that 29 of its 30 teams had players who had played in the Appalachian League when it was part of Minor League Baseball, with a total of 139 such players on Opening Day rosters. (Note: With 26 active players on each MLB roster, the Appalachian League alumni represented 17.8% (139 of 780) of active players in MLB.)

In conjunction with a contraction of Minor League Baseball in 2021, the Appalachian League was converted to an amateur collegiate summer baseball league designed for rising freshmen and sophomores. The reconfigured league become a part of Major League Baseball's Prospect Development Pipeline, a collaboration between MLB and USA Baseball. It is scheduled to play a 48-game regular season and continue to host an annual All-Star Game. Each of the league's 10 cities will continue to host teams in the new configuration of the Appalachian League.

== Current teams ==
Division	Team	City	Stadium	Capacity
East	Bluefield Ridge Runners	Bluefield, West Virginia	Bowen Field at Peters Park	3,000
East	Burlington Sock Puppets	Burlington, North Carolina	Burlington Athletic Stadium	3,500
East	Danville Otterbots	Danville, Virginia	American Legion Post 325 Field	2,588
East	Pulaski River Turtles	Pulaski, Virginia	Motor Mile Field at Calfee Park	3,200
West	Elizabethton River Riders	Elizabethton, Tennessee	Northeast Community Credit Union Ballpark	2,000
West	Greeneville Flyboys	Greeneville, Tennessee	Pioneer Park	5,000
West	Johnson City Doughboys	Johnson City, Tennessee	TVA Credit Union Ballpark	3,800
West	Kingsport Axmen	Kingsport, Tennessee	Hunter Wright Stadium	2,500

Current Appalachian League Team Locations:
East Division
West Division

== Teams timeline ==
=== 1911–1914 ===
- Asheville Moonshiners (1911–1912) → Middlesboro Colonels (1913–1914)
- Bristol Boosters (1911–1913) → Harriman Boosters (1914)
- Cleveland Counts (1911–1913) → Morristown Jobbers (1913–1914)
- Johnson City Soldiers (1911–1913)
- Knoxville Appalachians (1911) → Knoxville Reds (1912–1914)
- Morristown Jobbers (1911–1912) → Rome Romans (1913)

=== 1921–1925 ===
- Bristol State Liners (1921–1925)
- Cleveland Manufacturers (1921–1922) → Morristown Roosters (1923–1925)
- Greeneville Burley Cubs (1921–1925)
- Johnson City Soldiers (1921–1924)
- Kingsport Indians (1921–1925)
- Knoxville Pioneers (1921–1924)

=== 1937–1955 ===
- Bluefield Blue–Grays (1946–1955)
- Bristol Twins (1940–1955)
- Elizabethton Betsy Red Sox (1937–1942) → Erwin Aces (1943) → Erwin Cubs (1944) → Elizabethton Betsy Cubs (1945–1948) → Elizabethton Betsy Local (1949–1950) → Elizabethton Phils (1951) → Pulaski Phillies (1952–1955)
- Erwin Mountaineers (1940)
- Greeneville Burley Cubs (1938–1942)
- Johnson City Soldiers (1937–1938) → Johnson City Cardinals (1939–1955)
- Kingsport Cherokees (1938–1941) → Kingsport Dodgers (1942) → Kingsport Cherokees (1943–1952) → Wytheville Statesmen (1953–1955)
- New River Rebels (1946–1950)
- Newport Canners (1937–1942)
- Pennington Gap Lee Bears (1937–1938) → Pennington Gap Bears (1939) → Pennington Gap Miners (1940)
- Pulaski Counts (1946–1950)
- Salem Rebels (1955)
- Welch Miners (1946–1955) → Marion A's (1955)

=== 1957–2020 ===
- Bluefield Dodgers (1957) → Bluefield Orioles (1958–2010) → Bluefield Blue Jays (2011–2020)
- Bristol Tigers (1969–1994) → Bristol White Sox (1995–2013) → Bristol Pirates (2014–2020)
- Harlan Red Sox (1965) → Covington Red Sox (1966) → Covington Astros (1967–1976)
- Harlan Smokies (1961–1962) → Harlan Yankees (1963) → Johnson City Yankees (1964–1974) → Johnson City Cardinals (1975–2020)
- Johnson City Phillies (1957–1960) → Johnson City Cardinals (1961)
- Kingsport Cherokees (1955) → Kingsport Orioles (1957) → Kingsport Senators (1959) → Kingsport Pirates (1960–1963)
- Kingsport Royals (1969–1973) → Kingsport Braves (1974–1979) → Kingsport Mets (1980–1982, 1984–2020)
- Lynchburg Senators (1959)
- Marion Mets (1965–1976)
- Martinsville Phillies (1988–1998) → Martinsville Astros (1999–2003) → Greeneville Astros (2004–2017) → Greeneville Reds (2018–2020)
- Middlesboro Senators (1961–1962) → Middlesboro Cubsox (1963)
- Pikeville Brewers (1982) → Pikeville Cubs (1983–1984) → Wytheville Cubs (1985–1989) → Huntington Cubs (1990–1994) → River City Rumblers (1995) → Pulaski Rangers (1997–2002) → Pulaski Blue Jays (2003–2006) → Pulaski Mariners (2008–2014) → Pulaski Yankees (2015–2020)
- Princeton Pirates (1988–1989) → Princeton Patriots (1990) → Princeton Reds (1991–1996) → Princeton Devil Rays (1997–2008) → Princeton Rays (2009–2020)
- Pulaski Braves (1982–1992) → Danville Braves (1993–2020)
- Pulaski Cubs (1957–1958) → Morristown Cubs (1959–1961)
- Pulaski Phillies (1969–1977) → Paintsville Highlanders (1978) → Paintsville Yankees (1979–1982) → Paintsville Brewers (1983–1984) → Burlington Indians (1986–2006) → Burlington Royals (2007–2020)
- Salem Rebels (1957–1967)
- Wytheville Cardinals (1957–1959) → Wytheville Senators (1960) → Wytheville Twins (1961–1963) → Wytheville A's (1964) → Wytheville Senators (1965) → Wytheville Reds (1967)
- Wytheville Senators (1969) → Wytheville Braves (1971–1973) → Elizabethton Twins (1974–2020)

=== From 2021 ===
- Bluefield Ridge Runners (2021–present)
- Bristol State Liners (2021–2025)
- Burlington Sock Puppets (2021–present)
- Danville Otterbots (2021–present)
- Elizabethton River Riders (2021–present)
- Greeneville Flyboys (2021–present)
- Johnson City Doughboys (2021–present)
- Kingsport Axmen (2021) → Kingsport Road Warriors (2021) → Kingsport Axmen (2021–present)
- Princeton WhistlePigs (2021–2023)
- Pulaski River Turtles (2021–present)
- Tri-State Coal Cats (2024–2025)

== Champions ==
League champions have been determined by different means since the Appalachian League's formation in 1911. Before 1984, the champions were usually the league pennant winners. With only a few early exceptions, champions since 1984 have been the winner of postseason playoffs.

== Hall of Fame ==
The league established a hall of fame in 2019; through 2022 elections, 46 people have been inducted. Members of the 2021 Hall of Fame induction class included Orlando Cepeda, Dotty Cox, Mahlon Luttrell, Joe Mauer, Ron Necciai, and Jimmy Rollins. CC Sabathia and Jim Leyland were the two members of the 2022 induction class.

== See also ==
- Sports league attendances
- Baseball awards § U.S. minor leagues
