= Hazard Bombers =

- 1948–1952; Hazard, Kentucky

Minor league affiliations
- Class: Class D
- League: Mountain States League

Major league affiliations
- Team: Brooklyn Dodgers (1950–1952)

Minor league titles
- League titles (1): 1951

Team data
- Name: Hazard Bombers (1949–1952)
- Ballpark: Bomber Field

The Hazard Bombers were a minor league baseball team that played in the Mountain States League between 1948 and 1952.

== History ==
The team began in 1948 in Oak Ridge, Tennessee, as the Oak Ridge Bombers. By the first week of June, the team led the league but attendance was poor. A Hazard businessman, Max Smith, bought the team and transferred them to Hazard. They were affiliates of the Brooklyn Dodgers (1950–1952). The 1951 Bombers were recognized as one of the 100 greatest minor league teams of all time.

== The ballpark ==
The Bombers played at Bomber Field. The Bobby Davis Museum and Park located at 234 Walnut Street Hazard, Kentucky 41701, has Bomber artifacts.

== Notable alumni ==
- Max Macon (1950–1951)
- Johnny Podres (1951) 4-time MLB All-Star; 1957 NL ERA Title
