= Kingsport Mets =

- 1921–2020; Kingsport, Tennessee

Team logo	Cap insignia

Minor league affiliations
- Class: Rookie (1963, 1969–1982, 1984–2020); Class D (1957, 1960–1962); Class D (1955); Class C (1954); Class D (1921–1925, 1938–1953)
- League: Appalachian League (1955, 1957, 1960–1963, 1969–1982, 1984–2020); Mountain States League (1953–1954); Appalachian League (1921–1925, 1938–1952)

Major league affiliations
- Team: New York Mets (1980–1982, 1984–2020); Atlanta Braves (1974–1979); Kansas City Royals (1969–1973); Pittsburgh Pirates (1960–1963); Baltimore Orioles (1957); New York Giants (1952); Chicago White Sox (1948); Washington Senators (1943, 1946–1947); Brooklyn Dodgers (1942)

Minor league titles
- League titles (7): 1944; 1945; 1951; 1973; 1977; 1988; 1995
- Division titles (5): 1973; 1977; 1988; 1995; 1996

Team data
- Name: Kingsport Mets (1980–1982, 1984–2020); Kingsport Braves (1974–1979); Kingsport Royals (1969–1973); Kingsport Pirates (1960–1963); Kingsport Orioles (1957); Kingsport Cherokees (1943–1955); Kingsport Dodgers (1942); Kingsport Cherokees (1938–1941); Kingsport Indians (1921–1925)
- Colors: Blue, orange, white
- Ballpark: Hunter Wright Stadium (1995–2020); Dobyns-Bennett High School (1969–1982, 1984–1994)

The Kingsport Mets were a Minor League Baseball team of the Appalachian League from 1921 to 2020. They were located in Kingsport, Tennessee, and were last named for the team's major league affiliate, the New York Mets. The team played its home games at Hunter Wright Stadium which opened in 1995. The Mets previously played at Dobyns-Bennett High School. In 1983, while Dobyns-Bennett's field was being renovated, the team temporarily moved to Sarasota, Florida, and played in the Gulf Coast League as the Gulf Coast League Mets.

== History ==
The first professional team to hail from Kingsport was the Kingsport Indians who played in the Appalachian League from 1921 to 1925. From 1938 to 1941, the Kingsport team was known as the Cherokees, but changed to the Dodgers in 1942 when the team became a farm team of Major League Baseball's Brooklyn Dodgers. They reverted to the Cherokees name in 1943 and continued to play under this moniker through 1955. The Kingsport Cherokees competed in the Mountain States League from 1953 to 1954, before returning to the Appalachian League in 1957 as the Kingsport Orioles after two years of dormancy. After another two years on hiatus, Kingsport returned as the Pirates from 1960 to 1963. From 1969 to 1970, they competed as the Kingsport Royals. Notable players during this period include Al Cowens and U L Washington.

From 1974 to 1979, they were known as the Braves. As an Atlanta Braves affiliate, multiple future major leaguers played for them, including Matt Sinatro, Rick Behenna, Jose Alvarez, Steve Bedrosian, Paul Runge, Brad Komminsk, Milt Thompson, Brook Jacoby, and Mike Payne. Additionally, National League MVP Dale Murphy and Cy Young Award winner Steve Bedrosian played in Kingsport.

In 1980, the team became known as the Kingsport Mets, the name under which the team has competed since then—with the exception of playing the 1983 season in Sarasota, Florida, as the Gulf Coast League Mets while their home stadium underwent renovations. Players Darryl Strawberry, Dwight Gooden, Kevin Mitchell, José Reyes, David Wright, Lastings Milledge, and A. J. Burnett made their professional debuts in Kingsport. The Mets won the Appalachian League Championship in 1988 and 1995.

The start of the 2020 season was postponed due to the COVID-19 pandemic before ultimately being cancelled on June 30. In conjunction with a contraction of Minor League Baseball beginning with the 2021 season, the Appalachian League was reorganized as a collegiate summer baseball league, and the Mets were replaced by a new franchise in the revamped league designed for rising college freshmen and sophomores.

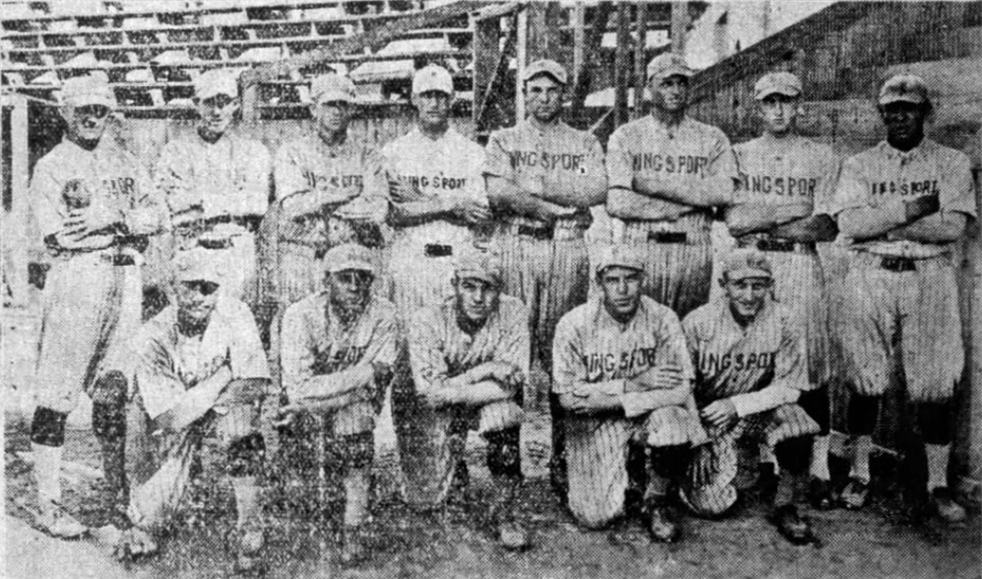
1921 Kingsport Indians

== All Silver Anniversary Team ==
In 2005, the team selected 14 former players and a manager for its All Silver Anniversary Team in commemoration of 25 years as a Mets affiliate.

Position	Player
Catcher	Brook Fordyce
First baseman	Gregg Jefferies
Second baseman	Quilvio Veras
Shortstop	José Reyes
Third baseman	David Wright
Left fielder	Kevin Mitchell
Center fielder	Preston Wilson
Right fielder	Darryl Strawberry
Designated hitter	Terrence Long
Utility player	Brian Daubach
Right-handed pitcher	Dwight Gooden
Left-handed pitcher	Pete Schourek
Relief pitcher	Randy Myers
Relief pitcher	Jason Isringhausen
Manager	John Gibbons

== Year-by-year record ==
Year	Record	Win %	Finish	GB	Manager	Postseason
1974	31–39–1	.443	7th	21.5	Hoyt Wilhelm	—
1975	33–33	.500	6th	7	Gene Hassell	—
1976	25–42	.373	8th	23.5	Bobby Dews	—
1977	43–26	.623	1st	—	Bob Didier	League Champions
1978	33–37	.471	5th	8.5	Eddie Haas	—
1979	39–31	.557	2nd	15.5	Gene Hassell	—
1980	35–35–1	.500	3rd	11	Chuck Hiller	—
1981	21–49	.300	6th	25	Al Jackson	—
1982	28–40	.412	7th	4.5	Ed Olsen	—
1984	31–38	.449	7th	9	Dan Radison	—

== Playoffs ==
- 1988: Defeated Burlington 2–0 to win league championship.
- 1995: Defeated Bluefield 2–1 to win league championship.
- 1996: Lost to Bluefield 2–1 in finals.
- 2013: Lost to Greeneville 2–1 in semifinals.
- 2015: Lost to Greeneville 2–1 in semifinals.
- 2018: Lost to Elizabethton 2–1 in semifinals.

== Notable alumni ==
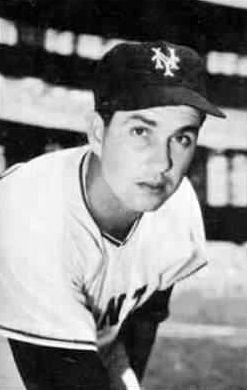
Hoyt Wilhelm

Baseball Hall of Fame alumni

- Hoyt Wilhelm (1974, MGR) Inducted, 1985

Notable alumni

- Steve Bedrosian (1978) MLB All-Star; 1987 NL Cy Young Award
- Heath Bell (1998) 3 x MLB All-Star
- Bruce Benedict (1976) 2 x MLB All-Star
- Steve Blass (1960) MLB All-Star
- Dick Bosman (1963) 1969 AL ERA Leader
- A. J. Burnett (1996) MLB All-Star
- Rick Camp (1974)
- Joey Cora (2001, MGR) MLB All-Star
- Al Cowens (1969)
- Jacob deGrom (2010) 3 x MLB All-Star; 2014 NL Rookie of the Year; 2018 and 2019 NL Cy Young
- Steven Matz (2012)
- Mike Difelice (2009-2010, MGR)
- Tim Foli (1998, MGR)
- Dwight Gooden (1982) 4 x MLB All-Star; 1984 NL Rookie of the Year; 1985 NL Cy Young Award
- Carlos Gomez (2004) 2 x MLB All-Star
- Glenn Hubbard (1975-1976) MLB All-Star
- Jason Isringhausen (1992) 2 x MLB All-Star
- Brook Jacoby (1979) 2 x MLB All-Star
- Gregg Jeffries (1985) 2 x MLB All-Star
- Dennis Leonard (1972)
- Jerry May (1961)
- Kevin Mitchell (1981) 2 x MLB All-Star; 1989 NL Most Valuable Player
- Dale Murphy (1974) MLB All-Star; 2 x NL Most Valuable Player (1982-1983)
- Daniel Murphy (2006) 3 x MLB All-Star
- Randy Myers (1982) 4 x MLB All-Star
- Angel Pagan (2000)
- Jose Reyes (2000) 3 x MLB All-Star; 2011 NL Batting Title
- Josh Satin (2008)
- Pete Schourek (1987)
- Darryl Strawberry (1980) 8 x MLB All-Star; 1983 NL Rookie of the Year
- Milt Thompson (1979)
- U.L. Washington (1973)
- Mookie Wilson (2003-2004, MGR)
- Preston Wilson (1993) MLB All-Star
- David Wright (2001-2002) 7 x MLB All-Star
