= Johnson City Cardinals (1939–1955) =

- 1939–1955; (1910–1913, 1921–1924, 1937–1955); Johnson City, Tennessee

Minor league affiliations
- Class: Class D (1910–1913, 1921–1924, 1937–1955)
- League: Southeastern League (1910); Appalachian League (1911–1913, 1921–1924, 1937–1955)

Major league affiliations
- Team: St. Louis Cardinals (1938–1955)

Minor league titles
- League titles (5): 1911; 1913; 1921; 1940; 1955
- Conference titles (2): 1952; 1953
- Wild card berths (10): 1939; 1940; 1941; 1943; 1944; 1945; 1947; 1948; 1951; 1955

Team data
- Name: Johnson City Soldiers (1910–1913, 1921–1924, 1937–1938); Johnson City Cardinals (1939–1955)
- Ballpark: Keystone Field (1910–1913, 1921–1924, 1937–1955)

The Johnson City Cardinals were a minor league baseball team based in Johnson City, Tennessee. The early Johnson City Cardinals teams had a 27-season tenure as members of the Class D level Appalachian League between 1939 and 1955, playing a minor league affiliate of the St. Louis Cardinals.

The Cardinals were preceded in Appalachian League membership by the Jonson City Soldiers, who began play as charter members in the league in 1911 and played exclusively in the Appalachian League through 1938. In the era, the Johnson City teams won Appalachian League championships in 1911, 1913, 1921, 1940 and 1955.

Beginning with their first season in 1910, Johnson City teams hosted minor league games at Keystone Field, which was constructed in 1908. Johnson City minor league teams played at Keystone Field through 1955. A new ballpark was built at the Keystone Field site in 1956 and is still in use today as TVA Credit Union Ballpark.

== History ==
=== 1910: Johnson City Soldiers / Southeastern League ===
Johnson City first hosted minor league baseball in 1910, when the Johnson City "Soldiers" became members of the Class D level Southeastern League, which had reformed for the 1910 season.

The Asheville Moonshiners, Gadsden Steel Makers, Knoxville Appalachians, Morristown Jobbers and Rome Romans teams joined with Johnson City in beginning the Southeastern League schedule with opening day games on June 18, 1910.

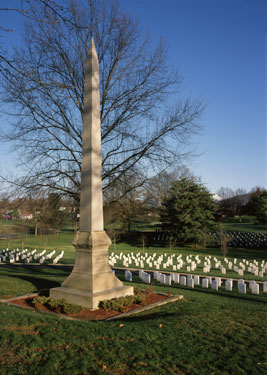
(2016) Brownlow Monument. Mountain Home National Cemetery. National Register of Historic Places.

The Johnson City team being known by the "Soldiers" nickname corresponds to local history and military service facilities. In the era, the city became home to the Mountain Branch, National Home for Disabled Volunteer Soldiers, which opened in 1904. Today, the facility is still in use and is a National Historic Landmark District. Johnson City is also home to the Mountain Home National Cemetery, established in 1903.

The Soldiers ended their first season with a 45–39 record in Southeastern League play. Their record earned a third-place finish as the team played the season under managers Nathaniel Taylor and Ed Gardner. Neither manager appeared in a game as a player. No playoffs were held as Johnson City finished 7.0 games behind the first place Knoxville Appalachians in the final league standings. With no playoffs being held, the final season standings determined the league champion.

The Southeastern League continued play in 1911 without Johnson City as a member. Johnson City and three other Southeastern League teams left the Southeastern League and joined a newly created league for the 1911 season. Only the Gadsden Steel Makers and Rome Hillies teams continued membership in the 1911 Southeastern League, which added teams to remain a six-team league. The league added the Anniston Models, Decatur Twins, Huntsville Westerns and Selma Centralites teams to replace the four departed members.

=== 1911 & 1912: Appalachian League charter members / champions ===
The Appalachian League was formed in 1911 and played its first season. Johnson City left the Southeastern League and became charter members of the six-team Class D level league. The Appalachian League was formed when four of the 1910 Southeastern League member teams changed leagues. The Jonhson City Soldiers, Asheville Moonshiners, Knoxville Appalachians and Morristown Jobbers teams continued play in the new league and joined with the Bristol Boosters and Cleveland Counts teams as the Appalachian League charter members. The Appalachian League began its first season of play with opening day games held May 22, 1911.

The Johnson City Soldiers were victorious in their first Appalachian League game on May 22, 1911, winning the season opener on the road. The Soldiers won in a 6–1 victory over the Cleveland Counts, before an estimated crowd of 500 at the Cleveland ballpark.

Pitcher Walt Herrell played for the Soldiers in 1911 at age 22. During the season Herrell was purchased by the Washington Senators and pitched briefly for the Senators in June, 1911 and then returned to Johnson City. Overall, Herrell compiled a 10–5 record pitching in 17 games for Johnson City.

The Johnson City Soldiers won first Appalachian League championship. In the league's first season, Johnson City ended the 1911 season in first place in the final standings. The league held no playoffs and with their first place regular season pennant, the Soldiers won the first Appalachian League championship. Johnson City ended the season with a 61–38 record playing under returning manager Ed Gardner. The first place Soldiers finished 1½ games ahead of the second place Knoxville Appalachians and 26.0 games ahead of the sixth place Briston Boosters in the final standings.

Johnson City outfielder B.M. Scurry led the Appalachian League with 11 triples on the season and fellow outfielder Pop Shaw had 165 total bases to lead the league. Shaw batted .340 on the season with 5 home runs in 109 games. Soldier pitchers Herb Kelly and A.J. Lee tied for the lead league with 17 victories. Both had 17–10 records. Kelly later appeared in 10 total major league games with the Pittsburgh Pirates in the 1914 and 1915 seasons.

In 1912, the Johnson City Soldiers were the Appalachian League defending champions and played the season with a new manager. On August 21, 1912, Cleveland Counts pitcher James Gudger pitched a 2–0 no-hitter against Johnson City.

The Soldiers ended their second season of Appalachian League play with a record of 54–48, finishing in third place under manager James Duffy. Johnson City was close to defending their first-place finish in the season prior, ending the 1912 season 4.0 games behind the first place Bristol Twins in the final standings. No Appalachian League playoffs were held. Returning outfielder Pop Shaw won the Appalachian League batting title, hitting .401 for the Soldiers in 76 games. Johnson City player/manager James Duffy played 45 games at second base and batted .181 for the Soldiers, appearing in 45 games.

=== 1913: Appalachian League controversial championship ===
For the second time in the first three seasons of the league, the Johnson City Soldiers won the championship in the 1913 six-team Class D level Appalachian League. The league had a playoff for the first time and Jonson City won a contentious championship. Legs Martin became the new Johnson City player/manager and proceeded to lead the Soldiers to a successful season. Martin had been a player on the 1912 Soldiers team. The Soldiers ended the season with a 66–38 record, ending the regular season in first place under manager Legs Martin. Jonnson City was 1½ games ahead of the second place Knoxville Reds in the overall standings. With the league adopting a split season schedule, Johnston City won the first half and Knoxville won the second half pennant.

Johnson City became the league champions amidst controversy. Knoxville was leading the championship series 2 games to 1 when they forfeited rather than play in Johnson City. The forfeit occurred due to alleged physical threats by Johnson City players and fans and Knoxville refused to play. Johnson City was supported and declared the league champions.

Johnson City pitchers Sam Hall and Sam Lanford both had identical 19–8 records for the Soldiers. Their 19 wins were the second most victories in the league behind Elmer Lawrence of Knoxville who finished 24–7. Playing the outfield in 104 games, Legs Martin batted .236 with 0 home runs and 5 triples in his dual role. In his second season with Johnson City at age 23, third baseman Barney Cleveland had a strong season for the Soldiers, batting .338 with 25 doubles, 11 triples and 1 home run in 107 games.

Pitcher Sam Lanford had returned to baseball with Johnson City in 1913 after a layoff from baseball due to rheumatism that greatly affected his right foot. Lanford had pitched briefly in the major leagues for the 1907 Washington Senators, appearing in 2 games. Following his season with Johnson City, Lanford played the 1914 season with the Miami Seminoles of the Florida East Coast League, his final season as a professional player at age 28. In 1915, Lanford married, became a prominent farmer in Greenville, South Carolina and played local semiprofessional baseball for many years. In 1926, Legs Martin had been incarcerated on drug charges when Lanford wrote him a compassionate letter and visited him in prison.

Despite winning the league championship the season prior, Johnson city did not return to play in the 1914 Appalachian League. The league reduced to a four-team league with only the Knoxville Reds, Middlesboro Colonels and Morristown Jobbers teams returning, joined by the Harriman Boosters. The Appalachian League subsequently folded during the 1914 season.

=== 1921: Appalachian League reforms / championship ===
After a six-season hiatus, the Appalachian League reformed for the 1921 season, with the Johnson City Soldiers returning to league membership. The Appalachian League reformed as a six-team Class D level league. W.T. Ellison was the league president as the Appalachian League's efforts to reform were successful. The Bristol State Liners, Cleveland Manufacturers, Greeneville Burley Cubs, Kingsport Indians and Knoxville Pioneers teams joined with Johnson City in the resuming league play. Opening day games were held on May 21. 1921.

The Soldiers began their 1921 season with a 2–1 loss to the Greeneville Burley Cubs on May 12, 1921, playing the season opener at home.

Greeneville won the first half of the league's split season on the way to compiling a full season record of 58–48. In the regular season, Johnson City won the second half pennant in the six team Class D level league by a ruling of the league president. Finishing in first place in the overall standings with a 63–44 overall record, Johnson City won the league pennant under player/manager Dave Taylor, finishing 2½ games ahead of the second place Kingsport Indians. With a playoff run, Johnson city became league champions. In the postseason championship playoff, the Soldiers defeated Greenville, 5 games to 1.

Outfielder Joe Price win the Appalachian League batting title in 1921, batting .363 with a league leading 18 home runs in 87 games for the Soldiers. The next best player in the Appalachian League hit 9 home runs. Johnson City outfielder H.A. Ringel had a league leading 18 triples on the season, while batting .294. The 1921 championship winning season was the final season in professional baseball for player/manager Dave Taylor and his only season as a manager. A catcher, Taylor batted .255 with 2 home runs while playing in 86 games for the Soldiers.

=== 1922 to 1924: Appalachian League ===
The 1922 Appalachian League continued play as a six-team Class D level league with games beginning on April 27, 1922. The Soldiers' new manager was Bill Schumacher, who had previously been the player/manager of the Winston-Salem Twins of the Piedmont League. Johnson City was the defending league champions and ended the season in fourth place. The Soldiers had a 60–61 record playing under manager Bill Schumaker. Johnson City finished 7½ games behind first place Briston State Liners in the final Appalachian League final standings. No playoffs were held A first baseman, manager Bill Schumacher did not appear in a game for Johnson City as a player in 1922.

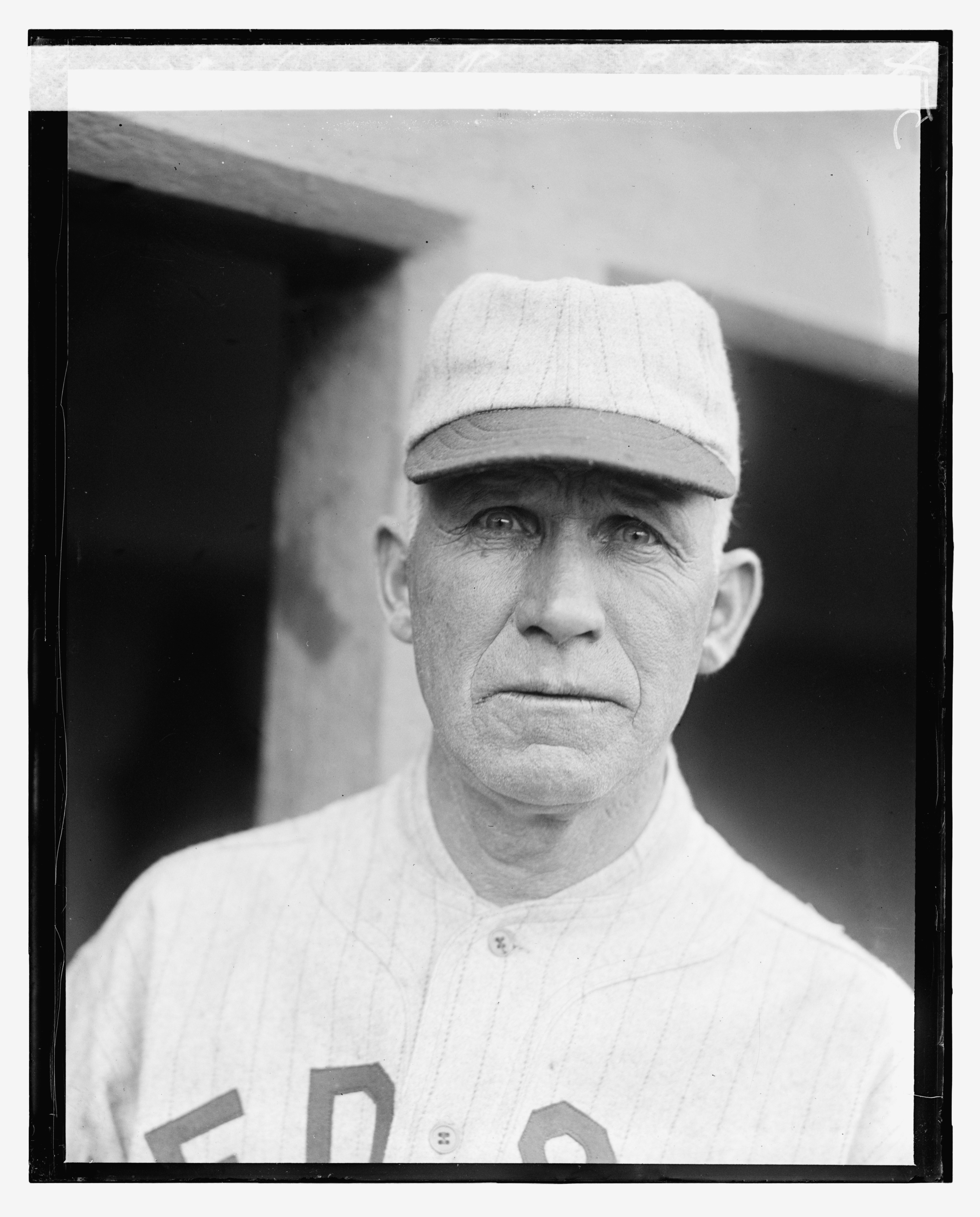
(1924) Jack Ryan, Boston Red Sox, pitching coach. Ryan managed Johnson City in 1923.

In Johnson City, Jack Ryan became the Soldiers' player/manager for the 1923 season at age 39. Ryan had his first managerial position the season prior, with the 1922 Pocomoke City Salamanders of the Eastern Shore League. Ryan had previously pitched in the major leagues with the Cleveland Naps (1908), Boston Red Sox (1909) and Brooklyn Dodgers (1911), winning 4 games in 24 total major league appearances. In February 1909, Cleveland traded Ryan to Boston in exchange for the legendary pitcher Cy Young.

The 1923 Appalachian League continued play as a six team Class D level league. The Johnson City Soldiers ended the season with a 47–57 record to finish in fifth place, playing the entire season under manager Jack Ryan. Johnson City finished 19.0 games behind the first place Knoxville Pioneers in the final standings as no playoffs were held. Jack Ryan had a perfect 9-0 record pitching in 9 games covering 74 innings for the Soldiers. Johnson City outfielder Joe Price led the Appalachian League with 15 home runs on the season. Price batted .311 on the season in 104 games at age 26. Price later played briefly for the New York Giants in 1928.

After the conclusion of the Johnson City 1923 season, manager Jack Ryan ended the season serving as the pitching coach for the Boston Red Sox, the beginning of a five-year tenure in the role.

For its 1924 season, the Appalachian League adopted a split-season schedule. Johnson City did not qualify for the playoff in the new format. The Soldiers ended the regular season with an overall record of 51–57, to finish in fifth place, ending the season 13.0 games behind first place Knoxville Pioneers. The Jonnson City manager in 1924 was Sam Hall In the league split season, Knoxville won the first half title and the Bristol State Liners won the second half pennant. The teams then met in the final, where Knoxville won the series in seven games over Bristol. 1924 was the only known season in professional baseball for Johnson City manager Samuel Hall.

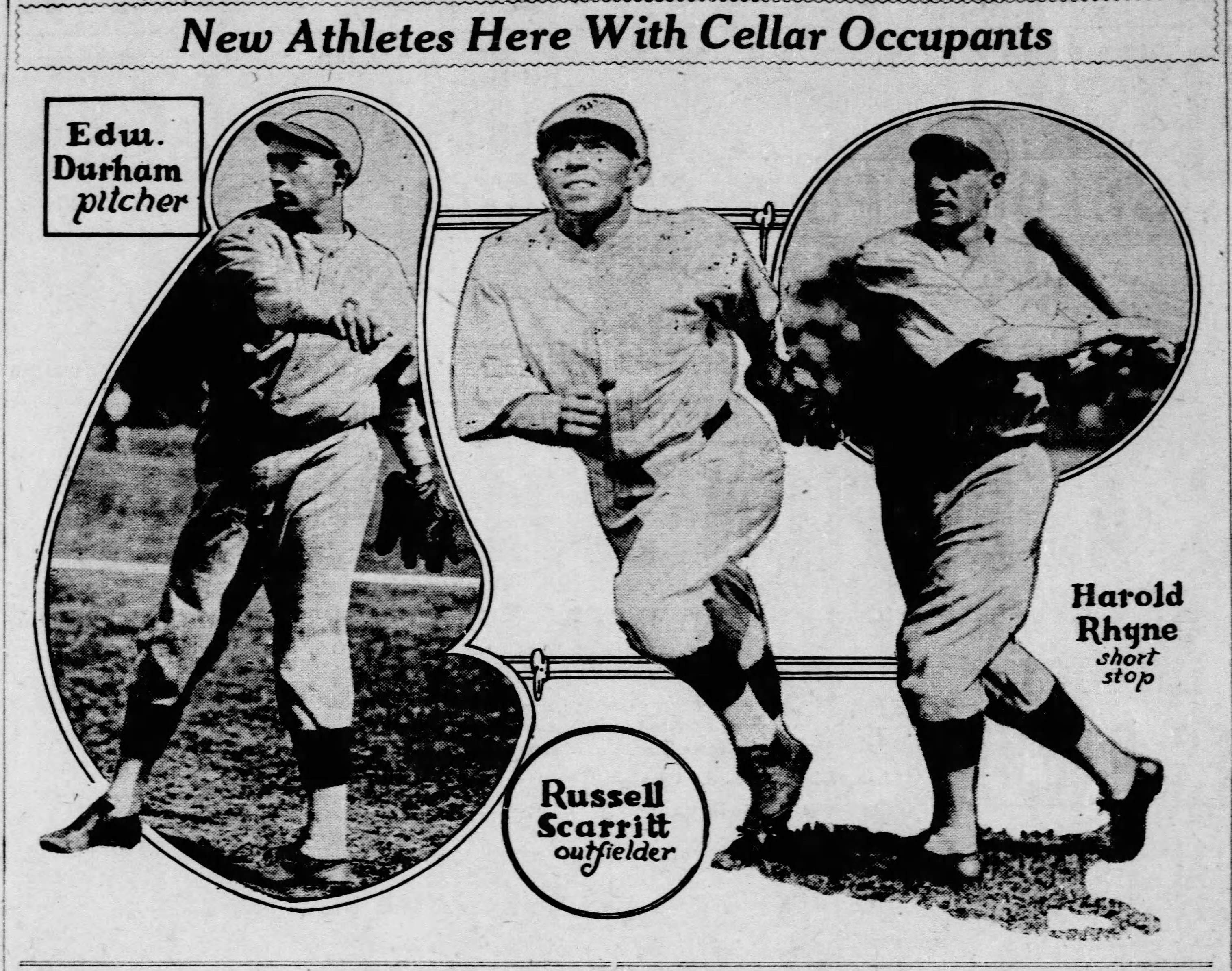
(1929) Boston Red Sox players Ed Durham, Russ Scarritt and Hal Rhyne. Scarritt played for Johnson City in 1923 and 1924, batting .340 in 1924.

Left-handed hitting outfielder Russ Scarritt played for Johnson City in both the 1923 and 1924 seasons., beginning his professional career with the Soldiers after playing "sandlot ball" with semi-professional teams and attending the University of Florida. In 1924, Scarritt batted .340 with 5 home runs in 95 games for the Soldiers. Scarritt had a strong rookie season for the 1929 Boston Red Sox, batting .294 with 22 doubles, 17 triples, 11 stolen bases and 71 RBIs in 151 games. He played in the major leagues with the Boston Red Sox (1929–1931) and Philadelphia Phillies (1932), batting .285 with 3 home runs and 120 RBIs in 285 career games. He never recovered from serious injury to his hand suffered in 1930 and his career was shortened as a result. He played in the minors through 1937 and retired after he lost his first wife to cancer and his home was burned down in a Christmas Day fire.

Johnson City did not return to the 1925 Appalachian League and the defending champion Knoxville Pioneers also did not return to the league. The 1925 Appalachian League reduced to a four-team league. The Class D level league played with Bristol, Greenville Burley, Kingsport and Morristown as the member franchises before folding on July 15, 1925, with Greenville in first place.

=== 1937 & 1938: Soldiers rejoin Appalachian League ===
For the 1937 season, the Johnson City minor league franchise reformed and the team rejoined the Appalachian League. The Soldiers became members as the Appalachian League again was reformed after folding following the 1925 season. The league reformed as a four-team Class D level league. The 1937 Appalachian League consisted of the Elizabethton Betsy Red Sox (Boston Red Sox affiliate), Newport Canners and Pennington Gap Lee Bears joining with Johnson City in the league. The season schedule began on May 21, 1937.

In their return to minor league baseball, Johnson City ended the 1937 season as the runner-up in the reformed Appalachian League overall standings. The Soldiers compiled an overall record of 52–51 to finish in second place, playing the season under manager Bill Dubbs. As a player, Dubbs had played for the Soldiers from 1910 to 1913 and was a well-known baseball leader in Johnson City. Dubbs brought in numerous players for tryouts before the season began and began compiling the team roster.

With their second place finish, Johnson City did not qualify for the playoffs as the Soldiers finished 5½ games behind the first place Elizabethton Betsy Red Sox (57–45) in the overall standings. The Appalachian League employed a split season schedule for the 1937 season, with Elizabethton winning the first half pennant Pennington Gap Lee winning the second half pennant. Pennington Gap Lee finished in third place in the overall standings. In the playoff, the Pennington Gap Lee Bears defeated Elizabethton 3 games to 2. Johnson City pitcher Lynn Luntsford led the Appalachian League with 144 strikeouts. Soldiers pitcher Robert Stanton had 20 hit by pitch batters to lead the league in the dubious category.

Johnson City became a minor league affiliate for the first time in 1938, with the franchise becoming a St. Louis Cardinals affiliate and beginning a lengthy partnership. The 1938 Appalachian League expanded to become a six-team league, adding the Kingsport Cherokees and Greeneville Burley Cubs (Chicago Cubs affiliate) teams to the league. With the expansion, the league incorporated post season playoffs. 1938 was the final season for Johnson City playing as the "Soldiers." The Soldiers were led during the season by player/ managers Joseph Sims and Phil Clark. After beginning the season with Johnson City, Sims was sent by the St. Louis Cardinals to pitch for the Mobile Shippers after pitching in 10 games for Johnson City with a 3–4 record. At age 24, Outfielder Phil Clark joined Johnson City as player/manager to replace Sims, coming over from the Springfield Cardinals of the Western Association. Clark batted .271 in 57 games with Johnson City in his dual role.

The Johnson City Soldiers ended the 1938 Appalachian League season with a record of 42–67 to end the season in sixth place in the six-team league. With their last place finish, the Soldiers finished 27.0 games behind the first place Elizabethton Betsy Red Sox. Placing sixth, Johnson City did not qualify for the four-team playoffs. The playoffs were won by Greeneville Burley, who defeated Kingsport in the final, as the two new league member teams had immediate success.

Left-handed hitting Outfielder John Hobson of Johnson City led the Appalachian League in slugging with .515 and tied for the league lead with 6 home runs. Hobson played in 46 games for the Soldiers. Johnson City pitcher Alphonse Bielan had the dubious distinction of leading the league in walks with 91, 21 more than the next pitcher, his teammate Russell Jordan.

Catcher Clyde Kluttz batted .318 in 79 games for Johnson City in 1938, his first professional season. Kluttz played in the major leagues with the Boston Braves (1942–1945), New York Giants (1945–1946), St. Louis Cardinals (1946), Pittsburgh Pirates (1947–1948), St. Louis Browns (1951) and Washington Senators (1951–1952)batting .268 with 19 home runs and 212 RBIs in 656 career games. Kluttz was a longtime became a scout with the Kansas City Athletics and New York Yankees after his playing career. He was credited with signing Baseball Hall of Fame member Catfish Hunter to his first professional contract. Later, while serving as the Yankees' scouting director (1974–75), he was instrumental in signing Hunter to join the Yankees. Kluttz served as director of player development for the Baltimore Orioles from 1976 until his death in 1979.

=== 1939: First "Cardinals" season ===
Johnson City had a new nickname other than "Soldiers" for the first time, as the team adopted the "Cardinals" nickname for the 1939 season. Johnson City continued Appalachian League membership while remaining a St. Louis Cardinals affiliate and adopting their parent club nickname. With the nickname change, Johnson City began a 27-season uninterrupted tenure of the Johnson City Cardinals playing exclusively in the Appalachian League.

With the affiliation in place, Ollie Vanek, a veteran manager in the St. Louis Cardinals' minor league system became the Johnson City manager in 1938. Two seasons prior, while managing the 1937 Monessen Cardinals in the Class D level Pennsylvania State Association, Vanek gave a notable tryout to a 16-year old player from the region. The young player was Stan Musial and after the tryout, Vanek recommended to the St. Louis Cardinals that they should sign Musial to a professional contract. Musial became a legendary Baseball Hall of Fame member player for the franchise.

Coming off their last place finish, Johnson City improved in 1939 under Vaned and qualified for the playoffs. The Cardinals ended the Appalachian League regular season with a 69–51 to finish in third place in the six-team league. Johnson City ended the season only 2½ games behind first place Elizabethton Betsy Red Sox in the Class D level league. In the four-team Appalachian League playoffs, Johnson City lost in the first round 2 games to 1 to the Kingsport Cherokees. The Elizabethton Betsy Red Sox won the final 3 games to 1 over Kingsport.

At age 22, Johnson City's left-handed first baseman Leo "Muscle" Shoals won the 1939 Appalachian League batting title, hitting .365. Shoals also led the Appalachian League in home runs, hitting 16 on the season in 106 games. Following his only season with Johnson City, Shoals continued a long minor league career, playing in every level of the minor leagues until age 38 and hitting 336 career minor league home runs. Cardinals' Pitcher Alphonse Bielan returned to Johnson City and again led the Appalachian League in walks with 98. His teammate Russell Jordan also returned to Johnson City and had 90 walks. Despite the high walk totals in the league, the two pitchers had a combined 29–20 record on the 1939 season.

=== 1940: Appalachian League champions ===
The 1940 Johnson City Cardinals won the league championship as the Appalachian League expanded to become an eight-team team league that season. The Bristol Twins and Erwin Mountaineers teams became the new league members in 1940 as the Appalachain League remained as a Class D level league. The Appalachian League utilized a split season schedule in 1940. Johnson City manager Ollie Vanek returned to the team as manager to begin the season. The owner of the local Johnson City Press-Chronicle newspaper, Carl Jones Jr. became the Johnson City Cardinals' franchise president, beginning in 1940.

After Ollie Vanek returned as manager, he was replaced during the 1940 season by George Silvey, who the led the team to the league championship. Essentially, Vanek and Silvey traded positions within St. Louis Cardinals affiliate teams. Silvey joined Johnson City from the Springfield Cardinals of the Western Association and Vanek immediately replaced him as player/manager in Springfield. Playing under both managers, the team finished 50 games above .500, compiling a record of 84–34 during the season. Their overall record was good for second place, just ½ game ahead of the first place Elizabethton Betsy Red Sox (84–33) in the overall standings. With the Appalachian League utilizing a split season schedule, the Johnson City Cardinals won the first half pennant and Elizabethton won the second half pennant. The two pennant winning teams then in played a unique six-team league playoff structure. In the first round of the Appalachian League playoffs, Johnson City defeated the fifth place Bristol Twins 2 games to 0. In the next round the Cardinals defeated the fourth place Greenville Cubs 2 games to 1 and advanced to the Final In the playoff final, the Johnson City Cardinals swept Elizabethton in 3 games to win the 1940 Appalachian League championship.

Johnson City had a strong batting lineup during their 1940 championship season. In his second season with Johnson City at age 21, catcher Dick Bouknight won the Appalachian League batting title, hitting .376 in 118 games. He also hit 11 home runs, with 38 doubles and 11 triples. In less than a full season, first baseman Harold Bush batted .393 with 14 home runs while appearing in 67 games at age 25. Playing first base and the outfield, player/manager George Silvey batted .379 with 5 home runs in 45 games after joining the team from Springfield. Before his departure to the Springfield Cardinals, player/manager Ollie Vanek batted .366 with 9 home runs in 63 games.

The championship pitching rotation for Johnson City featured four right-handed starting pitchers. Cardinal hurler Arthur Cyrulewski compiled a 20–3 record on the season, with a 3.03 ERA at age 19. Following Cyrulewski in the Johnson City pitching rotation, Harold Bullock had a record of 19–5, Edwin Green compiled a 17–5 record and Fred Renaldi was at 13–10.

Following the 1940 season, the St. Louis Cardinals assigned Ollie Vanek as to remain as manager of the 1941 Springfield Cardinals in the Western Association. There he managed a young Stan Musial and removed Musial from his full-time pitching duties and put Musial full-time in the outfield. Musial then made his major league debut at the end of the 1941 season. Later, in 1960, while serving as a scout for the St Louis Cardinals, Vanek scouted Joe Namath and he and the St. Louis Cardinals offered Namath a reported $15,000 bonus to sign at age 17 while still in high school. Namath chose to pursue a football career and play college football instead.

=== 1941 to 1943: Appalachian League ===
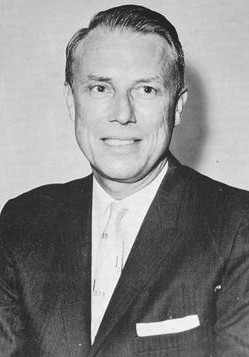
(1962) Bing Devine, general manager St. Louis Cardinals. Devine was a player and business manager for the 1941 Johnson City Cardinals.

In 1941, Bing Devine became the business manager of the Johnson City Cardinals. Three years earlier, Devine had graduated in from Washington University in St. Louis, Missouri and had secured a job with the St. Louis Cardinals organization. While working in Johnson City, Devine met his future wife Mary while she was on a date with one of the Johnson City Cardinal players. Facing a roster emergency during the 1941 season, Devine, a former collegiate player activated himself as a second baseman for the team to fill the roster vacancy. Devine played in 27 games and batted .118 batting average for Johnson City in 1941, his only professional season as a player. After the 1941 season Devine began military service in U.S. Navy during World War II. Devine became a long time baseball executive serving as the St. Louis Cardinals General Manager (1957–1964), New York Mets President and General Manager (1966–1967), St. Louis Cardinals General Manager (1967–1978) and Vice President of player development for the Montreal Expos (1980 to 1981). Aside from baseball he served as the President of the St. Louis Football Cardinals (1981–1986). Devine returned to baseball, serving as a special scout and advisor for the St. Louis Cardinals from 1999 until his death in 2007.

For the 1941 season, the Appalachian League reduced two teams and again became a six-team league, as the Erwin Mountaineers and Pennington Gap Miners did not return to the league in 1941. As defending champions in the Class D level league, the Johnson City Cardinals reached the Appalachian League finals. The Cardinals played the season under player/managers Johnny Morrow and Harold Michel. During the season, the 26-year-old Morrow was promoted as a player to the New Orleans Pelicans in the Southern Association, where he batted .455 in 22 games after leaving Johnson City.

The Jonhson City Cardinals had a strong season in 1941 while advancing to the Appalachian League finals. The Cardinals ended the regular season with a 63–57 record. Johnson City finished in fourth place in the overall standings, ending the season 11.0 games behind first place Elizabethton Betsy Red Sox. The Appalachian League again had adopted the split season schedule with Johnson City winning the first half pennant and Elizabethton winning the second half pennant. The two teams met for a rematch in the final. In the final, Elizabethton Betsy swept the Cardinals in three games to win the championship.

Johnson City player/manager Harry Michel hit .390 with 16 home runs in 117 games at catcher in 1941. Before his promotion as a player, Johnny Morrow batted .363 with 3 home runs in 83 games at shortstop for the Cardinals. Johnson City first baseman Richard Connell led the Appalachian League in slugging, with a.606 mark, adding 35 doubles, a league leading 20 triples and 11 home runs while batting .382 in 114 games.

Pitcher and Johnson City native Jim Mooney joined the Johnson City Cardinals in 1941 at age 34. Mooney compiled an 8-2 record with a 2.44 ERA in 10 games and issued just 4 walks in 70 innings for Johnson City. Mooney had previously pitched in the major leagues with the New York Giants (1931–1932) and St. Louis Cardinals (1933–1934), with a 17–20 career record. In his final major league season, Mooney was a member of the 1934 World Series championship St. Louis Cardinals team. Mooney pitched for Johnson City in the evenings after his teaching and baseball coaching duties at the East Tennessee State University were completed for the day.

Former Johnson City player/manager George Silvey returned to the franchise and replaced Bing Devine as he became the business manager of the Johnson City Cardinals to begin the 1942 season. Silvey had been the player/manager of the Fresno Cardinals of the California League in 1941. Silvey later served as the Scouting Director for the St. Louis Cardinals from 1963 to 1973 and scouted for the team until 1983.

The Appalachian League remained as a six-team Class D level league in the 1942 season. Playing the season under managers George Silvey and Mercer Harris, the Johnson City Cardinals ended the season with a 42-67 record. Continuing play as an affiliate of the St. Louis Cardinals, Johnson City finished in fourth place as both the Greenville Burley Cubs (June 15) and Newport Canners (June 27) teams folded during the season. This left Johnson City in last place of the four remaining teams. In the final standings, Johnson finished 30.0 games behind the first place Bristol Twins. Bristol defeated the Elizabethton Betsy Red Sox in the league finals to win the Appalachian League championship. Returning to pitch for Johnson City, Jim Mooney had a record of 15-11 at age 35 and led the league with 192 innings pitched. His Cardinal teammate Larry Guelfo led the Appalachian League with 102 walks in a 5-12 season. Playing second base in his dual role, Mercer Harris batted .326 in 71 games for Johnson City at age 33.

At age 17, left-handed hitting first baseman Rocky Nelson played 53 games for the 1942 Cardinals in his first professional season. Following the season with Johnson City, Nelson's baseball career was interrupted by military service during World War II. From February 20, 1943, through 1945, he served with the U.S. Army in the Pacific Theater. Nelson acquired his "Rocky" nickname when he and Cardinal teammate Whitey Kurowski had a pepper game and Nelson was struck hard in the head by a ball. After being struck, Nelson was not phased and Kurowski called him "Rocky." The nickname stuck with him for the rest of his life. Following his military service, Nelson resumed his baseball career, playing for the 1946 St. Joseph Cardinals. Nelson advanced to play nine seasons in the major leagues with the St. Louis Cardinals (1949–1951), Pittsburgh Pirates (1951), Chicago White Sox (1951), Brooklyn Dodgers (1952), Cleveland Indians (1954), Brooklyn Dodgers (1956), St. Louis Cardinals (1956) and Pittsburgh Pirates (1959–1961). He batted .249 with 31 home runs in 620 career major league games. He batted .300 in 1960 as his Pittsburgh Pirates team won the 1960 World Series. Nelson batted .333 in the World Series with 1 home run and 2 RBIs.

Infielder Julius Schoendienst played for Johnson City in 1942 at age 21. He batted .236 playing in 47 games at shortstop in his second season with the Cardinals. Julius was the younger brother of long time St. Louis Cardinal player and manager Red Schoendienst.

Jim Mooney returned to pitch for the Johnson City Cardinals in 1942 and served as the interim manager when Mercer Harris was suspended for a few games following a run-in with an umpire. Following the 1942 season, Mooney resigned from his position at East Tennessee State University and began service in the U.S. Navy, where his service during World War II ran through 1945.

In 1943, with the nation embroiled in World War II, there were only 11 total minor leagues that organized to play a 1943 season, down from 30 leagues the season prior. The Appalachian League and the Pennsylvania–Ontario–New York League (PONY League) were the only Class D level minor leagues that organized and played a 1943 schedule. Veteran catcher Ken Blackman became the Johnson City player/manager at age 32. Blackman came to Johnson City having managed the Hamilton Red Wings, a St. Louis Cardinals affiliate in the Pennsylvania-Ontario-New York League in 1942.

With the Appalachian League playing the season as a four-team league, the Johnson City Cardinals finished in last place in the 1943 league final regular season standings, with all the league teams participating in a four-team playoff. The Cardinals ended the season with a final record of 36–77, playing the entire season under manager Ken Blackman. Playing 113 total games during the season, Johnson City finished 40.0 games behind the first place Bristol Twins in the final regular season Appalachian League standings. In the first round of the four-team playoff postseason, Johnson City lost their series 3 games to 1 to the eventual league champion Erwin Aces, a Chicago Cubs affiliate. Advancing, Erwin then defeated Briston in seven games in the finals to secure the league title. Player/manager Ken Blackman played 50 games at catcher for Johnson City and batted .225 with 1 home run on the season.

=== 1944 to 1946: Appalachian League continues play during World War II ===
The Appalachian League continued play in 1944 as a four-team Class D level league during World War II. For the second consecutive season, only 10 total minor leagues were formed and played a season during the war. Overall, over 2,000 active minor league baseball players (and over 500 major league players) were called into military service during World War II.

The Jonhson City Cardinals player/manager during the 1944 season was George T. Smith. A pitcher, Smith became a first-time manager at ate 34. Smith was nicknamed "Pappy." The Cardinals ended the Appalachian League regular season with a record of 56–56, finishing the regular season in third place under player/manager Smith Johnson City ended the season 8½ games behind first place Kingsport Cherokees in the final standings. With their third place finish, Johnson City qualified for the four-team playoffs. The Cardinals lost in first round of the playoffs to Kingsport 3 games to 1. Kingsport advanced and beat the Bristol Twins in the final to win the league title. In his dual role, George Smith compiled a record of 5-0 with a 1.70 ERA while pitching in 8 games for Johnson City.

Geroge Smith remained in the St. Louis Cardinals organization in 1945 and left Johnson City to become the player/manager of the Winston-Salem Cardinals of the Class C level Carolina League. Longtime minor league manager and player Clifton "Runt" Marr became the Johnson City manager for the 1945 season at age 53. Marr had first managed in the 1922 minor league season and came to Johnson City having managed the Lima Red Birds of the Class D level Ohio State League in 1944.

The 1945 Appalachian League remained a four-team league during World War II. There were 12 total minor leagues that played in 1944 and the Appalachian League was one of four Class D level leagues. In the four-team league, the Cardinals had a final record of 40–65 and finished in third place. The managers Runt Marr and Fred Hawn. With a distant third place finish, Johnson City played 105 total games and ended the regular season 31.0 games behind the first place Kingsport Cherokees. In the four-team Appalachian League playoffs, the Cardinals lost in first round, being swept by Kingsport in three games. Kingsport then defeated the Bristol Twins in the final for the second consecutive season. At age 17, left handed first baseman Sid Langston batted .364 in 84 games to finish second in the Appalachian League in average. Johnson City pitcher James Pierre was second in the league with 177 strikeouts and he led the league in three dubious categories with 113 walks surrendered, 11 Hit Batters and 20 wild pitches in a 6-14 season.

Two future major league players played for Johnson City as 17-year-olds in 1945. Pitcher Cloyd Boyer and infielder Jim Clark both made their professional debuts with the Cardinals. Boyer had a 4-7 record in 13 games with a 5.00 ERA. Clark played shortstop for Johnson City and batted .246 in 51 games with 0 home runs. Jim Clark played briefly for the 1948 Washington Senators.

Cloyd Boyer had a long career in baseball as a player and a coach. He was the older brother of Clete Boyer and Ken Boyer. Cloyd pitched for the St. Louis Cardinals (1949–1952) and Kansas City Athletics (1955) with a 20–23 career record and 4.73 ERA. He later became a pitching coach with the New York Yankees (1975, 1977), Atlanta Braves (1978–1981) and Kansas City Royals (1982–1983). In 1977, Cloyd was a coach on the 1977 World Series Champion New York Yankees team.

In 1946, Runt Marr did not return to Johnson City, as he became a co-founder of the newly created Kansas-Oklahoma-Missouri League and secured the Carthage Cardinals franchise in the league. Marr remained with the St. Louis Cardinals' organization, serving as a scout for many years. He had signed Cloyd Boyer and Ken Boyer among others. He was also the first scout to contact Mickey Mantle and tried to persuade his father to allow Mickey to sign with the Cardinals. While scouting for the Cardinals, Marr also offered a contract to Bob Gibson while he was graduating from high School, but Gibson instead attended Creighton University on a basketball scholarship. Aside from the Cardinals, Marr scouted for the Detroit Tigers, Cleveland Indians, Kansas City Athletics, and New York Mets.

Ted Garbee replaced Runt Marr as the Johnson City manager in 1946. Garbee was a pitcher and became a professional player/manager for the first time at age 38. Nicknamed "Specs," Garbee had just completed military service with the U.S. Army during World War II when he joined Johnson City. Garbee had been a player/manager for both baseball and basketball teams while in his military service. Garbee also was a sports columnist for the local Press-Chronicle newspaper.

With World War II completed, the Appalachian League expanded to an eight-team league for the 1946 season. The Cardinals would end the season in fifth place. The Bluefield Blue–Grays, New River Rebels, Pulaski Counts and Welch Miners franchises joined the league, which remained classified as a Class D level league.

As the Appalachian League expanded, the Cardinals ended the 1946 season with a 64–60 record. This earned Johnson City a fifth place finish, playing the full season under manager Ted Garbee. With their fifth-place finish, the Cardinals did not qualify for the four-team playoffs won by the New River Rebels. Johnson City finished 17½ games behind New River in the final regular season standings. Cardinal pitcher Robert Hoch led the league with a 2.39 ERA in 166 innings pitched. Johnson City outfielder Joseph Muzzo batted a noteworthy .413, adding 11 home runs and 40 RBIs while playing in 46 games upon his return from military service. Johnson City player/manager Ted Garbee compiled a 14–4 with a 2.79 ERA in 27 games and 155 innings with 12 complete games.

At age 17, Joe Schoendienst played shortstop for Johnson City, batting /291 in 18 games after being acquired from the Springfield Giants. He was the younger brother of Baseball Hall of Fame member Red Schoendienst, a longtime St. Louis Cardinals player and manager.

=== 1947 to 1950: Appalachian League ===
Ted Garbee remained in the St. Louis Cardinals organization and was promoted to become the player/manager of the Class B level Allentown Cardinals of the Interstate League for the 1947 season. Garbee was replaced as the Johnson City manager in 1947 by Bob Kline. Kline joined the Johnson City having managed the Marion Cardinals of the Ohio State League to a sixth place finish in 1946, their final season as a St. Louis Cardinals affiliate. A former major league player, Kline had pitched in the major leagues with the Boston Red Sox (1930–1933), Philadelphia Athletics (1934) and Washington Senators (1934), compiling 30–28 career record, with 6 saves in 148 career games. A knee injury suffered in 1941 shortened Kline's playing career.

Johnson City ended the 1947 Appalachian League regular season with a record of 54–70, finishing in seventh place under manager Bob Kline in the eight-team league. The Cardinals did not qualify for the four-team playoffs. Their seventh place season left the Cardinals 26.0 games behind the first place Pulaski Counts in the final standings. The New River Rebels won the Appalachian League championship in sweeping the playoffs, defeating Pulaski in the finals. At age 18, left-handed hitting outfielder Charlie Frey batted .365 with 23 doubles, 15 triples, 14 home runs and 82 RBIs in 122 games with Johnson City. The 5'6" Frey later returned to Johnson City to manage the 1961 team. Frey became a scout for the St. Louis Cardinals and signed Ray Washburn and Jim McAndrew among others.

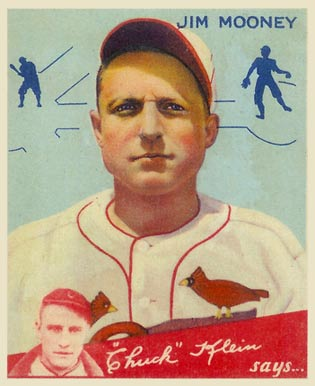
(1934) Jim Mooney, St. Louis Cardinals, baseball card. Mooney pitched four seasons with the Johnson City Cardinals and won 13 games for the 1947 team at age 40. Mooney pitched for Johnson City between his service in the U.S. Navy during World War II.

At age 40, Jim Mooney returned to his hometown Johnson City team and won 13 games for the Cardinals in 1947.

Beginning his professional career, Herb Moford pitched with Mooney on the 1947 Johnson City staff. At Johnson City Moford complied a 1-4, with an 8.38 ERA to begin his career at age 18. Moford improved and later pitched in the major leagues for parts of four seasons with the St. Louis Cardinals (1955), Detroit Tigers (1958), Boston Red Sox (1959) and New York Mets (1962), compiling a 5–13 career record in 50 career appearances. On April 11, 1962, Moford had a notable appearance as he pitched for the expansion team in first New York Met game in franchise history. Moford was one of four New York pitchers to appear in the Mets' 11–4 loss to the St. Louis Cardinals at Busch Stadium. The Met other pitchers who appeared in the game under by Mets' manager Casey Stengel were Roger Craig, Bob Moorhead and Clem Labine. Two days later, Moford pitched at the Polo Grounds in New York City in the Mets’ first home opener on April 13, 1962.

The 1947 season with Johnson city was manager Bob Kline's final season in uniform in professional baseball at age 37. In 1948, following his season with Johnson City, Kline became a scout for the St. Louis Cardinals, a position he held through 1957. He then scouted for the Kansas City Athletics in 1958 and 1959.

Ted "Specs" Garbee returned as the Johnson City manager in 1948 at age 40, also pitching for the Cardinals that season. The Johnson City Cardinals qualified for the Appalachian League playoffs in 1948 with a fourth-place regular season finish. The Cardinals compiled a record of 67–56 while playing the full season under Ted Garbee. Johnson City finished 17.0 games behind the first place Pulaski Counts. Pulaski defeated the Bluefield Blue-Grays in the finals. In the four-team playoffs, the Cardinals lost in the first round of the playoffs, swept in 3 games by eventual the champion Pulaski Counts. In his dual role, Ted Garbee compiled a 5–3 record with a 2.43 ERA in 25 games and 97 innings for the Cardinals. Johnson City first baseman James Dickey batted .341 with 22 home runs, 106 RBIs and 20 stolen bases. The 1948 season was the final one in professional baseball for Specs Garbee. He became a longtime sporting goods manager in his hometown of Lynchburg, Virginia.

Johnson City continued Appalachian State League membership in 1949 as Ben Catchings became the Cardinals player/manager, beginning a three-season tenure with the organization. Catchings had served in a similar role with the Alexander City Millers of the Georgia–Alabama League in 1948.

The Johnson City Cardinals ended their 1949 season in fourth place, qualifying for the playoffs in the eight-team league. With a regular season record of 59–63, the Cardinals finished 29.0 games behind the first place Bluefield Blue-Grays. The Cardinals qualified for the playoffs in rebounding from their seventh place finish the season prior. In their first round playoff series, Johnson City lost in the first round to eventual champion Bluefield 2 games to 0. Playing second base and third base for Johnson City, manager Ben Catchings batted .260 with a .413 OBP and 19 RBIs in 40 total games. At age 37, the 1949 season was his final season as a player.

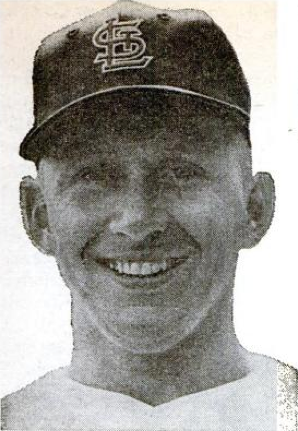
(1960) Joe Cunningham, St. Louis Cardinals. Cunningham played for Johnson City in 1949 at age 17

At age 17, Joe Cunningham played 60 games at first base for Johnson City in 1949. Cunningham had just graduated from Lodi High School (New Jersey) in 1949 when he was signed by St. Louis Cardinals scout Benny Borgmann to a contract paying him $150 per month in his first professional season. A former basketball player, Borgmann was later inducted into the Naismith Memorial Basketball Hall of Fame in 1961. The St. Louis Cardinals assigned Cunningham to the Johnson City Cardinals for his first season. The left-handed hitting Cunningham batted .345 with a .472 OPS for Johnson City in his partial season with the team. After his season Johnson City, Cunningham rose in the St. Louis minor league system, until making his major league debut in 1954. In the major leagues, Cunningham became a two-time All-Star in his career, playing for the St. Louis Cardinals (1954, 1956–1961), Chicago White Sox (1962–1964) and Washington Senators (1964–1966). In 1,121 career major league games, Cunningham batted .291 with a .403 OBP and a .820 OPS. In his 12 career major league seasons he hit 64 home runs with 599 career bases on balls more than his 369 careerstrikeouts.

After his playing career ended, Joe Cunningham worked for the St. Louis organization in various capacities from 1968 through the late 1990s. The St. Louis Cardinals subsequently honored Cunningham in 2015, when the franchise dedicated a section of Busch Stadium as "Cunningham Corner" in 2015.

In the 1950 season, Ben Catchings did not play, but returned for his second of three seasons managing Johnson City in the Class D level Appalachian League. Continuing their tenure as a St. Louis Cardinals affiliate, Johnson City ended the regular season with a record of 73–48, finishing in third place, 7½ games behind the first place Bluefield Blue-Grays in the eight-team league. Did not qualify for the playoff as Briston defeated Bluefield in the final. At age 21, Johnson City outfielder Sidney Hathaway batted .344 for the Cardinals, adding 13, triples, 4 home runs, 26 stolen bases in 109 games and 103 runs scored on the season. Fellow outfielder Clyde Whitener batted left-handed and hit .343 with 15 home runs in 109 games, playing at age 30. In his second season with the Johnson City at age 20, Cardinal pitcher Gene Swinger compiled a 14–9 record with a 4.73 ERA on the season. Swinger led the Appalachian League with 144 total bases on balls in 211 innings pitched.

=== 1951 to 1955: Three Appalachian League pennants ===
In 1951 Ben Catchings managed his third and final season with Johnson City at age 39. The Class D level Appalachian League continued play, reducing to a six-team league with the New River Rebels and Pulaski Counts teams not returning to the league in 1951. The Johnson City Cardinals remained as a St. Louis Cardinals affiliate and joined with the Bluefield Blue-Grays (Boston Braves affiliate), Bristol Twins ( New York Giants), Elizabethton Phils (Philadelphia Phillies), Kingsport Cherokees and Welch Miners (Cincinnati Reds) teams in the 1951 league. Opening day games in the Appalachian League were held on April 29, 1951.

The Cardinals ended the 1951 Appalachian League regular season with 64–65 record. Johnson City finished in third place under manager Ben Catchings. In the final regular season Appalachian League standings, the Cardinals ended the schedule 21.0 games behind the first place Kingsport Cherokees in the six-team Class D level league. In the four team playoffs, Johnson City lost in the first round of the playoffs 2 games to 1 to the Bluefield Blue-Grays. Bluefield advance and lost to Kingsport in the final.

Johnson City pitcher Gary Blaylock compiled 23 wins in 1951 to lead the Appalachian League along with 248 strikeouts. Blaylock was the starting pitcher in the Appalachian League all-star game. Cardinal hurler Robert Donahue issued 141 walks most in the league and had a 1–11 overall record in 131 innings. Gary Blaylock was second in the league with 134 walks issued. Cardinal outfielder Sidney Hathaway and infielder Jack Siemer both had 12 triples to co-lead the league.

After his tenure with Johnson City, Gary Blaylock pitched briefly in the major leagues, appearing in 41 total games pitching for both the St. louis Cardinals and New York Yankees in the 1959 season. Blalock became a long-time major league coach. Notably, Blaylock was the pitching coach for the 1985 World Series champion Kansas City Royals.

Outfielder Sidney Hathaway had returned to the Johnson City Cardinals for a second season in 1951. He batted .362 with a .472 OBP for Johnson City, adding 12, triples, 6 home runs, 69 RBIs, 26 stolen bases and 103 runs scored in 118 games on the season. At age 22, the season was the last one for Hathaway as a player in professional baseball aside from 1 at bat in 1954 for the Lynchburg Cardinals. Born in the Appalachian area of Tennessee, Hathaway became a teacher and a coach in Elizabethton, Tennessee area following his playing career.

As recorded on January 12, 1952, Carl Johnson of the Press-Chronicle was the Johnson City Baseball Club Inc. president; Howard Patrick of Suburban Transit Lines was vice-president; T.W. Atkins of the Press-Chronicle was treasurer; Clarence W. Bralley of the Miller Arts Building was team secretary and Jerry Brier of the Press-Chronicle Building was the club's business manager. Brier's home address was given as a contact at 116 W. Wataga Ave.

For the 1952 season, outfielder James Hercinger became the Johnson City Cardinals player/manager at age 28, his first managerial position. Hercinger had been a regular outfielder for the Omaha Cardinals of the Class A level Western League the prior two seasons.

The Johnson City Cardinals won the 1952 Appalachian League pennant. Johnson city ended the regular season with a final record of 69–47 first place player/manager James Hercinger. Won league pennant, finishing 9½ games ahead of the second place Briston Twins in the six-team Class D level league. Johnson City lost in the first round of the four-team playoffs, losing to the fourth place Pulaski Phillies 2 games to 1. The Welch Miners defeated Pulaski in the final.

At age 28, Jim Hercinger played in 114 games in the outfield and batted .339 with 16 home runs and 101 RBIs for Jonnson City. Playing in 79 games at age 18, Cardinal outfielder and second baseman Jack Lee batted .379 to win the Appalachian Lague batting title by 20 points. Johnson City pitcher Enso Zanatta compiled a 2.48 ERA, second in the Appalachian League and had a 14-3 season.

Jonnson City continued strong play in the six-team Appalachian League, winning their second consecutive league pennant in 1953. Under returning manager James Hercinger, the Cardinals had a record of 84–43 first place returning manager James Hercinger. The team won the league pennant and lost in the playoff finals/ In a close pennant race, Johnson City finished a mere 1.0 game over the second place Welch Miners (82–43) in the final standings. The 1953 Appalachian League played only a final series where the Cardinals lost in the finals 3 games to 0 to the Welch Miners.

In his second season with Johnson City at age 21, third baseman Richard Stanton led the league with 27 home runs. Overall, Stanton, batted .257 with 27 home runs and 106 RBIs in 120 games. He did commit 35 errors at third base. Outfielder Grady Chavis led the league in three categories with 120 runs scored, 33 stolen bases and 123 bases on balls. Outfielder William Hopkins had a strong season for Johnson City batting .349, an OBP of .481, 26 home runs 86 RBIS and 15 stolen bases in just 70 games before being promoted to the Class B level Lynchburg Cardinals where he played 26 games to end the season. Player/manager Jim Hercinger batted .334 with 18 home runs and 91 RBIs and a .442 OBP in 120 games.

Cardinal hurler Billy Joe Bowman led the Appalachian League pitchers with a 2.10 ERA in 16 games and compiled an 11–3 record on the 1953 season. A native of Johnson City and a graduate of Science Hill High School, Billy Bowman pitched for well for his hometown team in 1953 in his first professional season at age 23. During the season he was drafted into the U.S. Army as a second lieutenant as he had received ROTC training at the while a student at the University of Tennessee. On June 26, 1953, the team held a "Billy Bowman Night" four days before his departure. In honor of his impending service, he was gifted a wristwatch, an electric razor, luggage, and a billfold containing $65. On June 30, 1953, Bowman entered the military and served most of his duty in Korea,

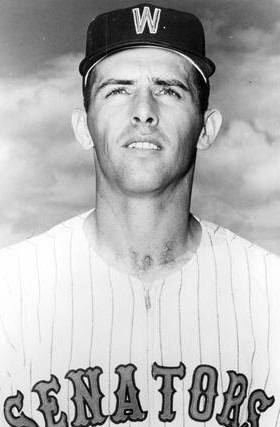
(1961) Joe McClain, Washington Senators. A Johnson City native, McClain pitched for his hometown Cardinals team in 1953 and had a 10–2 record.

Another Johnson City native, pitcher Joe McClain had a 10–2 record with a 3.43 ERA pitching for his hometown Johnson City team in 1953 at age 20. He joined the Cardinals, signing a professional contract after pitching for the University of Tennessee in 1952. McClain later pitched in the major leagues for the Washington Senators (1961–1962) and compiled an 8–22 and 4.42 ERA record in 43 career games. He was 8–18 with a 3.66 ERA as a rookie before injuries shortened his career. McClain once pitched for the Senators with President John F. Kennedy in attendance. McClain lived and worked in Johnson City after his baseball career ended due to arm injuries.

After the 1953 season, Jim Hercinger remained in the St. Louis Cardinals organization and became the manager of the Fresno Cardinals of the Class C level California League for the 1954 season.

Lee Peterson became the Johnson City manager during the season in 1954, having managed the Paducah Chiefs the prior season and remained with Paducah in 1954 to begin the season. Hal Contini began the 1954 season as the player/manager of the Johnson City Cardinals. With both Paducah and Johnson City being Class D level St. Louis Cardinals affiliates, Contini and Lee Peterson literally traded places as player/managers, as Peterson joined Johnson City when Contini joined Paducah.

After two consecutive Appalachian League pennants, the Johnson City Cardinals failed to qualify for the playoffs in 1954. Johnson City finished the regular season with a record of 49–70, finishing in fifth place in the six-team league under managers Lee Peterson and Harold Contini. the Jonson City Cardinals drew 22,553 for the entire 1954season. With their fifth place finish the Cardinals did not qualify for the four-team Appalachian League playoffs, finishing 24.0 games behind the first place Bluefield Blue-Grays in the final regular season standings of the six-team, Class D level league. Bluefield won the league title, sweeping the Pulaski Phillies in 3 games in the final.

In his first professional season at age 18, Howie Nunn pitched for Johnson City in 1954 and had an 11–5 record in 31 games with 17 starts. Nunn would return to the Cardinals in 1955.

Player/manager Harold Contini batted .385 in 16 games for Johnson City, playing second base in his final season in professional baseball at age 37. In his stint with the team, Lee Peterson pitched in 30 games for Johnson City at age 33. Peterson had a 5–10 record with a 4.50 ERA for the Cardinals in his dual role.

The 1955 Appalachian League expanded to an eight-team Class D level league, adding the Salem Rebels and Kingsport Cherokees teams to the league. Johnson City joined with the returning league members consisting of the Bluefield Blue-Grays (Boston Red Sox affiliate), Bristol Twins (New York Yankees), Pulaski Phillies (Philadelphia Phillies), Welch Miners (Kansas City Athletics and the Wytheville Statesmen in the league membership. The eight-team Appalachian League schedule began with opening games on May 1, 1955.

First baseman Wayne Wallace joined the Johnson City Cardinals in 1955 as the player/manager. At the age of 27, the managerial position was the first for the 6'4" tall Wallace. In 1954, he had been a player for both the Fresno Cardinals and Omaha Cardinals teams during the season, batting .288 with 5 home runs.

The Johnson City Cardinals ended the 1955 schedule with a record of 74–51, which put the Cardinals in second place, while playing the season under player/manager Wayne Wallace. Johnson City finished 11½ games behind the first place Salem Rebels in the Appalachian League regular season standings and the Cardinals qualified for the playoffs. In the four-team playoffs, the Cardinals defeated the Bristol Twins 2 games to 1. Johnson city had advanced to the final, which was cancelled. Johnson City was set to play against Salem who had defeated the Kingsport Cherokees in their first round series. However, the teams were declared co-champions when the finals series was forced to be canceled due to continued rain.

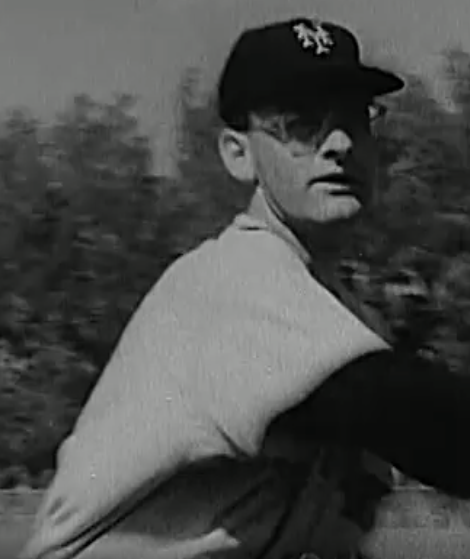
(1962) Howie Nunn, New York Mets spring training. Nunn led the 1955 Appalachian League in three categories while pitching for Johnson City.

Playing exclusively at first base for the Cardinals at age 27, player/manager Wayne Wallace batted .355 with a .413 OBP, 35 doubles, 11 triples, 26 home runs and 108 RBI's on the season.

Pitcher Howie Nunn returned to Johnson City and had a strong season, lending the 1955 Appalachian League pitchers with 249 strikeouts, 243 innings pitched and 18 complete games, while compiling 18–5 record with a 3.11 ERA. Nunn later pitched in the major leagues with the St. Louis Cardinals (1959), Cincinnati Reds (1961–1962), winning 4 games in 46 career appearances. In February 1962, Nunn was signed by the infamous expansion 1962 New York Mets but did not appear in a game for the Mets.

At age 21, outfielder Grady Chavis returned to Jonhson City for a third time and led the Appalachian League with 106 bases on balls. Johnson City second baseman William Huffman led the league with 165 total hits on the season while batting .326.

The Johnson City Cardinals did not return to play in 1956, as the Appalachian League folded. Wayne Wallace became the player/manager of the Dublin Irish of the Class D Level Georgia State League, a Pittsburgh Pirates affiliate.

=== 1956: Appalachian League folds ===
In 1956, the Appalachian League disbanded for one season. The Johnson City Cardinals and seven other league teams did not return to minor league play for the 1956 season.

After its one season hiatus, the Appalachian League reformed in 1957 with the Johnson City franchise rejoining the six-team league. No longer a St. Louis Cardinals affiliate, the Johnson City Phillies began another tenure of league play and the Phillies began play in the new Johnson City ballpark in 1957. The Johnson City franchise later became a St. Louis affiliate known as the "Cardinals" again for just the 1961 season and again from 1975 to 2019.

Today, the collegiate amateur Johnson City Doughboys play collegiate summer baseball as a member of the Appalachian League. The Doughboys team was founded in 2021. The team plays at the TVA Credit Union Ballpark, first constructed in 1956.

== The ballpark ==
The Johnson City minor league teams of the era hosted home minor league games at Keystone Field in Johnson City. The Keystone Field ballpark was constructed in 1908. A new ballpark was built on the site in 1956. Keystone Field was also referred to as "Cardinal Field" while hosting the Johnson City Cardinals teams.

On Sunday, June 9, 1946, Keystone Field hosted an historic Negro Southern League double header between the Asheville Blues and Montgomery Dodgers. Asheville won the games decisively by scores of 24-0 and 22-0. Pitchers Frank Fleming and Vernon Phillips of Asheville both threw no-hitters against Montgomery in the doubleheader.

The ballpark constructed in 1956 has been renovated and upgraded several times and is still in use today, known as TVA Credit Union Ballpark. TVA Credit Union Ballpark is located at 111 Legion Street in Johnson City. Today, a new Keystone Park public park is adjacent to the TVA Credit Union Ballpark site at 601 Bert Street in Johnson City. The Keystone Park site contains youth ballfields.

== Timeline ==
Year(s)	# Yrs.	Team	Level	League	Affiliate	Ballpark
1910	1	Johnson City Soldiers	Class D	Southeastern League	None	Keystone Field
1911–1913	3	Johnson City Soldiers	Class D	Appalachian League	None	Keystone Field
1921–1924	4	Johnson City Soldiers	Class D	Appalachian League	None	Keystone Field
1937	1	Johnson City Soldiers	Class D	Appalachian League	None	Keystone Field
1938	1	Johnson City Soldiers	Class D	Appalachian League	St. Louis Cardinals	Keystone Field
1939–1955	17	Johnson City Cardinals	Class D	Appalachian League	St. Louis Cardinals	Keystone Field

== Year–by–year records ==
Year	Record	Finish	Manager	Playoffs/Notes
1910	45–39	3rd	Nathaniel Taylor / Ed Gardner	No playoffs held
1911	61–38	1st	Ed Gardner	No playoffs held League champions
1912	54–48	3rd	James Duffy	No playoffs held
1913	66–38	1st	Legs Martin	Playoff forfeit League champions *
1921	63–44	1st	Dave Taylor	No playoffs held League champions
1922	60–61	4th	Bill Schumaker	No playoffs held
1923	47–57	5th	Jack Ryan	No playoffs held
1924	51–57	5th	Sam Hall	No playoffs held
1937	52–51	2nd	Billy Dubbs	Did not qualify
1938	42–67	6th	Joseph Sims / Phil Clark	Did not qualify
1939	69–51	3rd	Ollie Vanek	Lost in 1st round
1940	84–34	2nd	Ollie Vanek / George Silvey	League champions
1941	63–57	4th	Johnny Morrow / Harold Michel	Lost League Finals
1942	42–67	4th	Mercer Harris	Did not qualify
1943	36–77	4th	Ken Blackman	Lost in 1st round
1944	56–56	3rd	George T. Smith	Lost in 1st round
1945	40–65	3rd	Fred Hawn / Runt Marr	Lost in 1st round
1946	64–60	5th	Ted Garbee	Did not qualify
1947	54–70	7th	Bob Kline	Did not qualify
1948	67–56	4th	Ted Garbee	Lost in 1st round
1949	59–63	4th	Ben Catchings	Did not qualify
1950	73–48	3rd	Ben Catchings	Did not qualify
1951	64–65	3rd	Ben Catchings	Lost in 1st round
1952	69–47	1st	James Hercinger	Won league pennant Lost in 1st round
1953	84–43	1st	James Hercinger	Won league pennant Lost in finals
1954	49–70	5th	Lee Peterson / Harold Contini	Did not qualify
1955	74–51	2nd	Wayne Wallace	Finals cancelled Co-Champions

== Notable alumni ==
- Charlie Bishop (1942)
- Cloyd Boyer (1945)
- Jim Clark (1945)
- Bernie Creger (1943–1944)
- Charlie Cozart (1940)
- Joe Cunningham (1949)
- Bing Devine (1941)
- Walt Herrell (1911–1912)
- Buck Hooker (1913)
- Herb Kelly (1911)
- Bob Kline (1947, MGR)
- Clyde Kluttz (1938)
- George Kopshaw (1923)
- Sam Lanford (1913)
- Runt Marr (1945, MGR)
- Joe McClain (1953)
- Herb Moford (1947)
- Jim Mooney (1941–1942, 1946–1947)
- Rocky Nelson (1942)
- Howie Nunn (1954–1955)
- Joe Price (1921, 1923)
- Jack Ryan (1923, MGR)
- Russ Scarritt (1923–1924)
- Muscle Shoals (1939)
- Ollie Vanek (1939–1940, MGR)

== See also ==
- Johnson City Cardinals players
- Johnson City Soldiers players
- List of Appalachian League champions
- List of St. Louis Cardinals minor league affiliates
- List of St. Louis Cardinals owners and executives
