= List of St. Louis Cardinals minor league affiliates =

Current St. Louis Cardinals domestic minor league affiliate locations

The St. Louis Cardinals farm system consists of six Minor League Baseball affiliates across the United States and in the Dominican Republic. Three teams are owned by the major league club, while three others—the Memphis Redbirds, Ozarks Springbirds, and Peoria Chiefs—are independently owned.

The Cardinals have been affiliated with the Triple-A Memphis Redbirds of the International League since 1998, making it the longest-running active affiliation in the organization among teams not owned by the Cardinals. The longest affiliation in team history was the 37-year relationship with the Texas League's Houston Buffaloes from 1919 to 1942 and 1946 to 1958. Their newest affiliate is the High-A Peoria Chiefs of the Midwest League, which became a Cardinals affiliate in 2013.

Geographically, St. Louis' closest domestic affiliate is the Peoria Chiefs, which are approximately 146 miles (235 km) away. St. Louis' furthest domestic affiliates are the Single-A Palm Beach Cardinals of the Florida State League and the Rookie Florida Complex League Cardinals of the Florida Complex League, which share a facility some 998 miles (1,606 km) away.

== Current affiliates ==
The St. Louis Cardinals farm system consists of six minor league affiliates.

Class	Team	League	Location	Ballpark	Affiliated
Triple-A	Memphis Redbirds	International League	Memphis, Tennessee	AutoZone Park	1998
Double-A	Ozarks Springbirds	Texas League	Springfield, Missouri	Route 66 Stadium	2005
High-A	Peoria Chiefs	Midwest League	Peoria, Illinois	Dozer Park	2013
Single-A	Palm Beach Cardinals	Florida State League	Jupiter, Florida	Roger Dean Chevrolet Stadium	2003
Rookie	FCL Cardinals	Florida Complex League	Jupiter, Florida	Roger Dean Chevrolet Stadium	2007
Rookie	DSL Cardinals	Dominican Summer League	Santo Domingo, Distrito Nacional	Las Américas Complex	2022

== Past affiliates ==
=== Key ===
Season	Each year is linked to an article about that particular Cardinals season.

=== 1919–1962 ===
Minor League Baseball operated with five classes (Double-A, Class A, Class B, Class C, and Class D) from 1919 to 1935. Class A1, between Double-A and Class A, was added in 1936. The minors continued to operate with these six levels through 1945. Triple-A was established as the highest classification in 1946, and Class A1 became Double-A, with Class A through D remaining. These six levels continued through 1962. The Pacific Coast League (PCL) was reclassified from Triple-A to Open in 1952 due to the possibility of becoming a third major league. This arrangement ended following the 1957 season when the relocation of the National League's Dodgers and Giants to the West Coast ended any chance of the PCL being promoted.

Season	Triple-A	Double-A	Class A	Class B	Class C	Class D	Ref.
1919	—	—	—	Houston Buffaloes	—	—	
1920	—	—	—	Houston Buffaloes	—	—	
1921	—	—	Houston Buffaloes	—	—	—	
1922	—	—	Houston Buffaloes	—	—	—	
1923	—	—	Houston Buffaloes	—	—	—	
1924	—	—	Houston Buffaloes	—	—	—	
1925	—	—	Houston Buffaloes	—	—	—	
1926	—	—	Houston Buffaloes	—	—	—	
1927	—	Syracuse Stars	Houston Buffaloes	—	—	—	
1928	—	Rochester Red Wings	Houston Buffaloes	—	—	—	
1929	—	Rochester Red Wings	Houston Buffaloes	—	—	—	
1930	—	Rochester Red Wings	Houston Buffaloes	—	—	Keokuk Indians	
1931	—	Rochester Red Wings	Houston Buffaloes	—	—	Keokuk Indians	
1932	—	Columbus Red Birds; Rochester Red Wings	Denver Bears; Houston Buffaloes	Danville Veterans; Elmira Red Wings; Greensboro Patriots; Mobile Red Warriors	Springfield Cardinals	Keokuk Indians; Monroe Twins	
1933	—	Columbus Red Birds; Rochester Red Wings	Elmira Red Wings; Houston Buffaloes; Springfield Cardinals	Greensboro Patriots; Springfield Senators	—	—	
1934	—	Columbus Red Birds; Rochester Red Wings	Elmira Red Wings; Houston Buffaloes	Greensboro Patriots	Huntington Red Birds; Paris Pirates / Lufkin Lumbermen; Springfield Red Wings	Greensburg Trojans	
1935	—	Columbus Red Birds; Rochester Red Wings	Houston Buffaloes	Asheville Tourists; Bloomington Bloomers	Greenwood Chiefs; Huntington Red Birds; Hutchinson Larks; Jacksonville Jax; Springfield Cardinals	Beatrice Blues; Greensburg Red Wings; New Iberia Cardinals	
1936	—	Columbus Red Birds; Rochester Red Wings; Sacramento Solons	Cedar Rapids Raiders; Houston Buffaloes (A1)	Asheville Tourists; Columbus Red Birds	Huntington Red Birds; Jacksonville Jax; Pine Bluff Judges; Springfield Cardinals	Albany Travelers; Americus Cardinals; Daytona Beach Islanders; Fostoria Cardinals; Greensburg Red Wings; Jamestown Jimmies; Mitchell Kernels; New Iberia Cardinals; New Philadelphia Red Birds; Newport Cardinals; Norfolk Elks; Ozark Cardinals; Union City Greyhounds	
1937	—	Columbus Red Birds; Rochester Red Wings; Sacramento Solons	Cedar Rapids Raiders; Houston Buffaloes (A1)	Asheville Tourists; Columbus Red Birds; Decatur Commodores; Mobile Shippers	Jacksonville Jax; Pine Bluff Judges; Portsmouth Red Birds; Springfield Cardinals	Cambridge Cardinals; Caruthersville Pilots; Crookston Pirates; Daytona Beach Islanders; Duluth Dukes; Fostoria Red Birds; Grand Island Red Birds; Midland Cardinals; Mitchell Kernels; Monessen Cardinals; New Iberia Cardinals; Newport Cardinals; Shelby Cardinals; Union City Greyhounds	
1938	—	Columbus Red Birds; Rochester Red Wings; Sacramento Solons	Houston Buffaloes (A1)	Asheville Tourists; Cedar Rapids Raiders; Columbus Red Birds; Decatur Commodores; Mobile Shippers	Amsterdam Rugmakers; Jacksonville Jax; Pine Bluff Judges; Portsmouth Red Birds; Springfield Cardinals	Albany Travelers; Cambridge Cardinals; Caruthersville Pilots; Daytona Beach Islanders; Duluth Dukes; Fostoria Red Birds; Grand Island Cardinals; Johnson City Soldiers; Midland Cardinals; Monett Red Birds; New Iberia Cardinals; Paducah Indians; Shelby Cardinals / Gastonia Cardinals	
1939	—	Columbus Red Birds; Rochester Red Wings; Sacramento Solons	Houston Buffaloes (A1)	Asheville Tourists; Columbus Red Birds; Decatur Commodores; Mobile Shippers	Kilgore Boomers; Pocatello Cardinals; Portsmouth Red Birds; Springfield Cardinals	Albany Cardinals; Albuquerque Cardinals; Cambridge Cardinals; Caruthersville Pilots; Duluth Dukes; Fostoria Red Birds; Gastonia Cardinals; Hamilton Red Wings; Johnson City Cardinals; Martinsville Manufacturers; Monett Red Birds; New Iberia Cardinals; Union City Greyhounds; Washington Red Birds; Williamson Red Birds; Worthington Cardinals	
1940	—	Columbus Red Birds; Rochester Red Wings; Sacramento Solons	Houston Buffaloes (A1); New Orleans Pelicans (A1)	Allentown Wings; Asheville Tourists; Columbus Red Birds; Decatur Commodores; Mobile Shippers	Albuquerque Cardinals; Kilgore Boomers; Lansing Lancers; Pocatello Cardinals; Portsmouth Red Birds; Springfield Cardinals	Albany Cardinals; Cambridge Canners; Caruthersville Pilots / Batesville Pilots; Daytona Beach Islanders; Duluth Dukes; Fostoria Red Birds; Gastonia Cardinals; Hamilton Red Wings; Johnson City Cardinals; Siloam Springs Cardinals; Union City Greyhounds; Washington Red Birds; Williamson Red Birds; Worthington Cardinals	
1941	—	Columbus Red Birds; Rochester Red Wings; Sacramento Solons	Houston Buffaloes (A1); New Orleans Pelicans (A1)	Asheville Tourists; Columbus Red Birds; Decatur Commodores; Mobile Shippers	Duluth Dukes; Fresno Cardinals; Pocatello Cardinals; Springfield Cardinals; Springfield Cardinals	Albany Cardinals; Batesville Pilots; Cambridge Canners; Cooleemee Cards; Daytona Beach Islanders; Fostoria Red Birds; Hamilton Red Wings; Johnson City Cardinals; Sioux City Soos; Union City Greyhounds; Washington Red Birds; Williamson Red Birds	
1942	—	Columbus Red Birds; Rochester Red Wings; Sacramento Solons	Houston Buffaloes (A1); New Orleans Pelicans (A1)	Allentown Wings; Asheville Tourists; Columbus Red Birds; Decatur Commodores; Mobile Shippers	Duluth Dukes; Fresno Cardinals; Pocatello Cardinals; Springfield Cardinals; Springfield Cardinals; Williamson Red Birds	Albany Cardinals; Hamilton Red Wings; Johnson City Cardinals; La Crosse Blackhawks; Union City Greyhounds; Washington Red Birds	
1943	—	Columbus Red Birds; Rochester Red Wings; Sacramento Solons	—	Allentown Wings; Lynchburg Cardinals	—	Jamestown Falcons; Johnson City Cardinals	
1944	—	Columbus Red Birds; Rochester Red Wings; Sacramento Solons	—	Allentown Cardinals; Lynchburg Cardinals	—	Johnson City Cardinals; Lima Red Birds	
1945	—	Columbus Red Birds; Rochester Red Wings	—	Allentown Cardinals; Lynchburg Cardinals	Winston-Salem Cardinals	Johnson City Cardinals; Marion Cardinals	
1946	Columbus Red Birds; Rochester Red Wings	Houston Buffaloes	Columbus Cardinals	Allentown Cardinals; Decatur Commodores; Lynchburg Cardinals	Duluth Dukes; Fresno Cardinals; Pocatello Cardinals; St. Joseph Cardinals; Winston-Salem Cardinals	Albany Cardinals; Carthage Cardinals; Hamilton Cardinals; Johnson City Cardinals; Marion Cardinals; Salisbury Cardinals	
1947	Columbus Red Birds; Rochester Red Wings	Houston Buffaloes	Columbus Cardinals; Omaha Cardinals	Allentown Cardinals; Decatur Commodores; Lynchburg Cardinals	Duluth Dukes; Fresno Cardinals; Pocatello Cardinals; St. Joseph Cardinals; Winston-Salem Cardinals	Albany Cardinals; Carthage Cardinals; Hamilton Cardinals; Johnson City Cardinals; Salisbury Cardinals; West Frankfort Cardinals	
1948	Columbus Red Birds; Rochester Red Wings	Houston Buffaloes	Columbus Cardinals; Omaha Cardinals	Allentown Cardinals; Lynchburg Cardinals	Duluth Dukes; Fresno Cardinals; Pocatello Cardinals; St. Joseph Cardinals; Winston-Salem Cardinals	Albany Cardinals; Carthage Cardinals; Hamilton Cardinals; Johnson City Cardinals; Lawrenceville Cardinals; Salisbury Cardinals; Tallassee Indians; West Frankfort Cardinals; Willows Cardinals	
1949	Columbus Red Birds; Rochester Red Wings	Houston Buffaloes	Columbus Cardinals; Omaha Cardinals	Allentown Cardinals; Lynchburg Cardinals; Winston-Salem Cardinals	Duluth Dukes; Fresno Cardinals; Pocatello Cardinals; St. Joseph Cardinals	Albany Cardinals; Hamilton Cardinals; Johnson City Cardinals; Lebanon Chix; Salisbury Cardinals; Tallassee Cardinals; West Frankfort Cardinals; Willows Cardinals	
1950	Columbus Red Birds; Rochester Red Wings	Houston Buffaloes	Columbus Cardinals; Omaha Cardinals	Allentown Cardinals; Lynchburg Cardinals; Montgomery Rebels; Winston-Salem Cardinals	Duluth Dukes; Fresno Cardinals; Pocatello Cardinals; St. Joseph Cardinals	Albany Cardinals; Geneva Red Birds; Goldsboro Cardinals; Hamilton Cardinals; Johnson City Cardinals; Lebanon Chix; West Frankfort Cardinals; Willows Cardinals	
1951	Columbus Red Birds; Rochester Red Wings	Houston Buffaloes	Columbus Cardinals; Omaha Cardinals	Allentown Cardinals; Lynchburg Cardinals; Tri-City Braves; Winston-Salem Cardinals	Fresno Cardinals; Pocatello Cardinals; St. Joseph Cardinals	Albany Cardinals; Goldsboro Cardinals; Hamilton Cardinals; Johnson City Cardinals	
1952	Columbus Red Birds; Rochester Red Wings	Houston Buffaloes	Columbus Cardinals; Omaha Cardinals	Allentown Cardinals; Lynchburg Cardinals; Winston-Salem Cardinals	Fresno Cardinals	Albany Cardinals; Goldsboro Jets; Hamilton Cardinals; Hazlehurst-Baxley Cardinals; Johnson City Cardinals; Paducah Chiefs	
1953	Columbus Red Birds; Rochester Red Wings	Houston Buffaloes	Columbus Cardinals; Omaha Cardinals	Lynchburg Cardinals; Winston-Salem Cardinals	Fresno Cardinals; St. Joseph Cardinals	Albany Cardinals; Ardmore Cardinals; Dothan Rebels; Hamilton Cardinals; Hannibal Cardinals; Hazlehurst-Baxley Cardinals; Johnson City Cardinals; Paducah Chiefs; Sanford Cardinals	
1954	Columbus Red Birds; Rochester Red Wings	Houston Buffaloes	Allentown Cardinals; Columbus Cardinals; Omaha Cardinals	Lynchburg Cardinals; Peoria Chiefs	Fresno Cardinals; Hot Springs Bathers; Joplin Cardinals; Mexicali Eagles; Winnipeg Goldeyes	Albany Cardinals; Ardmore Cardinals; Daytona Beach Islanders; Dothan Rebels; Hamilton Cardinals; Hannibal Cardinals; Hazlehurst-Baxley Cardinals; Johnson City Cardinals; Paducah Chiefs	
1955	Omaha Cardinals; Rochester Red Wings	Houston Buffaloes	Allentown Cardinals; Columbus Cardinals	Lynchburg Cardinals; Peoria Chiefs	Fresno Cardinals; Mexicali Eagles; Winnipeg Goldeyes	Albany Cardinals; Ardmore Cardinals; Decatur Commodores; Dothan Cardinals; Hamilton Cardinals; Hazlehurst-Baxley Cardinals; Johnson City Cardinals; Paducah Chiefs; Sanford Cardinals	
1956	Omaha Cardinals; Rochester Red Wings	Houston Buffaloes	Allentown Cardinals; Sioux City Soos	Beaumont Exporters; Peoria Chiefs	Fresno Cardinals; Mexicali Eagles; Winnipeg Goldeyes	Albany Cardinals; Ardmore Cardinals; Decatur Commodores; Dothan Cardinals; Gainesville G-Men	
1957	Omaha Cardinals; Rochester Red Wings	Houston Buffaloes	Columbus Foxes	Winston-Salem Red Birds	Billings Mustangs; Winnipeg Goldeyes	Albany Cardinals; Ardmore Cardinals; Daytona Beach Islanders; Decatur Commodores; Wytheville Cardinals	
1958	Omaha Cardinals; Rochester Red Wings	Houston Buffaloes	York White Roses	Winston-Salem Red Birds	Billings Mustangs; Stockton Ports; Winnipeg Goldeyes	Albany Cardinals; Daytona Beach Islanders; Dothan Cardinals; Hobbs Cardinals; Keokuk Cardinals; Wytheville Cardinals	
1959	Omaha Cardinals; Rochester Red Wings	Tulsa Oilers	York White Roses	Winston-Salem Red Birds	Billings Mustangs; Winnipeg Goldeyes	Daytona Beach Islanders; Dothan Cardinals; Hobbs Cardinals; Keokuk Cardinals; Wytheville Cardinals	
1960	Rochester Red Wings	Memphis Chickasaws; Tulsa Oilers	—	Winston-Salem Red Birds	Billings Mustangs; Winnipeg Goldeyes	Daytona Beach Islanders; Dothan Cardinals; Keokuk Cardinals	
1961	San Juan Marlins / Charleston Marlins; Portland Beavers	Tulsa Oilers	Lancaster Red Roses	—	Billings Mustangs; Winnipeg Goldeyes	Johnson City Cardinals; Keokuk Cardinals	
1962	Atlanta Crackers	Tulsa Oilers	Portsmouth-Norfolk Tides	—	Billings Mustangs; Winnipeg Goldeyes	Brunswick Cardinals	

=== 1963–1989 ===
Prior to the 1963 season, Major League Baseball (MLB) initiated a reorganization of Minor League Baseball that resulted in a reduction from six classes to four (Triple-A, Double-A, Class A, and Rookie) in response to the general decline of the minors throughout the 1950s and early-1960s when leagues and teams folded due to shrinking attendance caused by baseball fans' preference for staying at home to watch MLB games on television. The only change made within the next 27 years was Class A being subdivided for the first time to form Class A Short Season in 1966.

Season	Triple-A	Double-A	Class A	Class A Short Season	Rookie	Ref(s).
1963	Atlanta Crackers	Tulsa Oilers	Billings Mustangs; Brunswick Cardinals; Winnipeg Goldeyes	—	—	
1964	Jacksonville Suns	Tulsa Oilers	Raleigh Cardinals; Rock Hill Cardinals; Winnipeg Goldeyes	—	SRL Cardinals	
1965	Jacksonville Suns	Tulsa Oilers	Cedar Rapids Cardinals; Raleigh Cardinals; Rock Hill Cardinals	—	FRL Cardinals	
1966	Tulsa Oilers	Arkansas Travelers	Cedar Rapids Cardinals; Rock Hill Cardinals; St. Petersburg Cardinals	—	GCL Cardinals	
1967	Tulsa Oilers	Arkansas Travelers	Cedar Rapids Cardinals; Modesto Reds; St. Petersburg Cardinals	Lewiston Broncs	GCL Cardinals	
1968	Tulsa Oilers	Arkansas Travelers	Cedar Rapids Cardinals; Modesto Reds; St. Petersburg Cardinals	Lewiston Broncs	GCL Cardinals	
1969	Tulsa Oilers	Arkansas Travelers	Cedar Rapids Cardinals; Modesto Reds; St. Petersburg Cardinals	Lewiston Broncs	GCL Cardinals	
1970	Tulsa Oilers	Arkansas Travelers	Cedar Rapids Cardinals; Modesto Reds; St. Petersburg Cardinals	Lewiston Broncs	GCL Cardinals	
1971	Tulsa Oilers	Arkansas Travelers	Cedar Rapids Cardinals; Modesto Reds; St. Petersburg Cardinals	—	GCL Cardinals	
1972	Tulsa Oilers	Arkansas Travelers	Cedar Rapids Cardinals; Modesto Reds; St. Petersburg Cardinals	—	GCL Cardinals; GCL Red Birds	
1973	Tulsa Oilers	Arkansas Travelers	Modesto Reds; St. Petersburg Cardinals	—	GCL Cardinals; GCL Red Birds	
1974	Tulsa Oilers	Arkansas Travelers	Modesto Reds; St. Petersburg Cardinals	—	GCL Cardinals	
1975	Tulsa Oilers	Arkansas Travelers	St. Petersburg Cardinals	—	Johnson City Cardinals; GCL Cardinals	
1976	Tulsa Oilers	Arkansas Travelers	St. Petersburg Cardinals	—	Johnson City Cardinals; GCL Cardinals	
1977	New Orleans Pelicans	Arkansas Travelers	Gastonia Cardinals; St. Petersburg Cardinals	—	Calgary Cardinals; Johnson City Cardinals	
1978	Springfield Redbirds	Arkansas Travelers	Gastonia Cardinals; St. Petersburg Cardinals	—	Calgary Cardinals; Johnson City Cardinals	
1979	Springfield Redbirds	Arkansas Travelers	Gastonia Cardinals; St. Petersburg Cardinals	—	Johnson City Cardinals	
1980	Springfield Redbirds	Arkansas Travelers	Gastonia Cardinals; St. Petersburg Cardinals	—	Johnson City Cardinals	
1981	Springfield Redbirds	Arkansas Travelers	Gastonia Cardinals; St. Petersburg Cardinals	Erie Cardinals	Johnson City Cardinals	
1982	Louisville Redbirds	Arkansas Travelers	Gastonia Cardinals; Springfield Cardinals; St. Petersburg Cardinals	Erie Cardinals	Johnson City Cardinals	
1983	Louisville Redbirds	Arkansas Travelers	Macon Redbirds; Springfield Cardinals; St. Petersburg Cardinals	Erie Cardinals	Johnson City Cardinals	
1984	Louisville Redbirds	Arkansas Travelers	Savannah Cardinals; Springfield Cardinals; St. Petersburg Cardinals	Erie Cardinals	Johnson City Cardinals	
1985	Louisville Redbirds	Arkansas Travelers	Savannah Cardinals; Springfield Cardinals; St. Petersburg Cardinals	Erie Cardinals	Johnson City Cardinals	
1986	Louisville Redbirds	Arkansas Travelers	Savannah Cardinals; Springfield Cardinals; St. Petersburg Cardinals	Erie Cardinals	Johnson City Cardinals	
1987	Louisville Redbirds	Arkansas Travelers	Savannah Cardinals; Springfield Cardinals; St. Petersburg Cardinals	Erie Cardinals	Johnson City Cardinals	
1988	Louisville Redbirds	Arkansas Travelers	Savannah Cardinals; Springfield Cardinals; St. Petersburg Cardinals	Hamilton Redbirds	Johnson City Cardinals	
1989	Louisville Redbirds	Arkansas Travelers	Savannah Cardinals; Springfield Cardinals; St. Petersburg Cardinals	Hamilton Redbirds	Johnson City Cardinals; AZL Cardinals; DSL Cardinals/Mets/Pirates	

=== 1990–2020 ===
Minor League Baseball operated with six classes from 1990 to 2020. In 1990, the Class A level was subdivided for a second time with the creation of Class A-Advanced. The Rookie level consisted of domestic and foreign circuits.

Season	Triple-A	Double-A	Class A-Advanced	Class A	Class A Short Season	Rookie	Foreign Rookie	Ref(s).
1990	Louisville Redbirds	Arkansas Travelers	St. Petersburg Cardinals	Savannah Cardinals; Springfield Cardinals	Hamilton Redbirds	Johnson City Cardinals; AZL Cardinals	DSL Cardinals/Astros	
1991	Louisville Redbirds	Arkansas Travelers	St. Petersburg Cardinals	Savannah Cardinals; Springfield Cardinals	Hamilton Redbirds	Johnson City Cardinals; AZL Cardinals	DSL Cardinals/Tigers	
1992	Louisville Redbirds	Arkansas Travelers	St. Petersburg Cardinals	Savannah Cardinals; Springfield Cardinals	Hamilton Redbirds	Johnson City Cardinals; AZL Cardinals	DSL Cardinals/Tigers	
1993	Louisville Redbirds	Arkansas Travelers	St. Petersburg Cardinals	Savannah Cardinals; Springfield Cardinals	Glens Falls Redbirds	Johnson City Cardinals; AZL Cardinals	DSL Cardinals/Tigers	
1994	Louisville Redbirds	Arkansas Travelers	St. Petersburg Cardinals	Madison Hatters; Savannah Cardinals	New Jersey Cardinals	Johnson City Cardinals; AZL Cardinals	DSL Cardinals/Phillies	
1995	Louisville Redbirds	Arkansas Travelers	St. Petersburg Cardinals	Peoria Chiefs; Savannah Cardinals	New Jersey Cardinals	Johnson City Cardinals	DSL Cardinals/Phillies	
1996	Louisville Redbirds	Arkansas Travelers	St. Petersburg Cardinals	Peoria Chiefs	New Jersey Cardinals	Johnson City Cardinals	DSL Cardinals	
1997	Louisville Redbirds	Arkansas Travelers	Prince William Cannons	Peoria Chiefs	New Jersey Cardinals	Johnson City Cardinals	DSL Cardinals	
1998	Memphis Redbirds	Arkansas Travelers	Prince William Cannons	Peoria Chiefs	New Jersey Cardinals	Johnson City Cardinals	DSL Cardinals	
1999	Memphis Redbirds	Arkansas Travelers	Potomac Cannons	Peoria Chiefs	New Jersey Cardinals	Johnson City Cardinals	DSL Cardinals	
2000	Memphis Redbirds	Arkansas Travelers	Potomac Cannons	Peoria Chiefs	New Jersey Cardinals	Johnson City Cardinals	DSL Cardinals	
2001	Memphis Redbirds	New Haven Ravens	Potomac Cannons	Peoria Chiefs	New Jersey Cardinals	Johnson City Cardinals	DSL Cardinals	
2002	Memphis Redbirds	New Haven Ravens	Potomac Cannons	Peoria Chiefs	New Jersey Cardinals	Johnson City Cardinals	DSL Cardinals; VSL Carora (Note: In 2002, the Cardinals operated a Venezuelan Summer League team as a co-op with the Toronto Blue Jays.)	
2003	Memphis Redbirds	Tennessee Smokies	Palm Beach Cardinals	Peoria Chiefs	New Jersey Cardinals	Johnson City Cardinals	DSL Cardinals	
2004	Memphis Redbirds	Tennessee Smokies	Palm Beach Cardinals	Peoria Chiefs	New Jersey Cardinals	Johnson City Cardinals	—	
2005	Memphis Redbirds	Springfield Cardinals	Palm Beach Cardinals	Swing of the Quad Cities	New Jersey Cardinals	Johnson City Cardinals	DSL Cardinals	
2006	Memphis Redbirds	Springfield Cardinals	Palm Beach Cardinals	Swing of the Quad Cities	State College Spikes	Johnson City Cardinals	DSL Cardinals; VSL Cardinals	
2007	Memphis Redbirds	Springfield Cardinals	Palm Beach Cardinals	Swing of the Quad Cities	Batavia Muckdogs	Johnson City Cardinals; GCL Cardinals	DSL Cardinals; VSL Cardinals	
2008	Memphis Redbirds	Springfield Cardinals	Palm Beach Cardinals	Quad Cities River Bandits	Batavia Muckdogs	Johnson City Cardinals; GCL Cardinals	DSL Cardinals; VSL Cardinals	
2009	Memphis Redbirds	Springfield Cardinals	Palm Beach Cardinals	Quad Cities River Bandits	Batavia Muckdogs	Johnson City Cardinals; GCL Cardinals	DSL Cardinals; VSL Cardinals	
2010	Memphis Redbirds	Springfield Cardinals	Palm Beach Cardinals	Quad Cities River Bandits	Batavia Muckdogs	Johnson City Cardinals; GCL Cardinals	DSL Cardinals; VSL Cardinals	
2011	Memphis Redbirds	Springfield Cardinals	Palm Beach Cardinals	Quad Cities River Bandits	Batavia Muckdogs	Johnson City Cardinals; GCL Cardinals	DSL Cardinals	
2012	Memphis Redbirds	Springfield Cardinals	Palm Beach Cardinals	Quad Cities River Bandits	Batavia Muckdogs	Johnson City Cardinals; GCL Cardinals	DSL Cardinals	
2013	Memphis Redbirds	Springfield Cardinals	Palm Beach Cardinals	Peoria Chiefs	State College Spikes	Johnson City Cardinals; GCL Cardinals	DSL Cardinals	
2014	Memphis Redbirds	Springfield Cardinals	Palm Beach Cardinals	Peoria Chiefs	State College Spikes	Johnson City Cardinals; GCL Cardinals	DSL Cardinals	
2015	Memphis Redbirds	Springfield Cardinals	Palm Beach Cardinals	Peoria Chiefs	State College Spikes	Johnson City Cardinals; GCL Cardinals	DSL Cardinals	
2016	Memphis Redbirds	Springfield Cardinals	Palm Beach Cardinals	Peoria Chiefs	State College Spikes	Johnson City Cardinals; GCL Cardinals	DSL Cardinals	
2017	Memphis Redbirds	Springfield Cardinals	Palm Beach Cardinals	Peoria Chiefs	State College Spikes	Johnson City Cardinals; GCL Cardinals	DSL Cardinals	
2018	Memphis Redbirds	Springfield Cardinals	Palm Beach Cardinals	Peoria Chiefs	State College Spikes	Johnson City Cardinals; GCL Cardinals	DSL Cardinals Blue; DSL Cardinals Red	
2019	Memphis Redbirds	Springfield Cardinals	Palm Beach Cardinals	Peoria Chiefs	State College Spikes	Johnson City Cardinals; GCL Cardinals	DSL Cardinals Blue; DSL Cardinals Red	
2020	Memphis Redbirds	Springfield Cardinals	Palm Beach Cardinals	Peoria Chiefs	State College Spikes	Johnson City Cardinals; GCL Cardinals	DSL Cardinals Blue; DSL Cardinals Red	

=== 2021–present ===
The current structure of Minor League Baseball is the result of an overall contraction of the system beginning with the 2021 season. Class A was reduced to two levels: High-A and Low-A. Low-A was reclassified as Single-A in 2022.

Season	Triple-A	Double-A	High-A	Single-A	Rookie	Foreign Rookie	Ref.
2021	Memphis Redbirds	Springfield Cardinals	Peoria Chiefs	Palm Beach Cardinals	FCL Cardinals	DSL Cardinals Blue; DSL Cardinals Red	
2022	Memphis Redbirds	Springfield Cardinals	Peoria Chiefs	Palm Beach Cardinals	FCL Cardinals	DSL Cardinals	
2023	Memphis Redbirds	Springfield Cardinals	Peoria Chiefs	Palm Beach Cardinals	FCL Cardinals	DSL Cardinals	
2024	Memphis Redbirds	Springfield Cardinals	Peoria Chiefs	Palm Beach Cardinals	FCL Cardinals	DSL Cardinals	
2025	Memphis Redbirds	Springfield Cardinals	Peoria Chiefs	Palm Beach Cardinals	FCL Cardinals	DSL Cardinals	
2026	Memphis Redbirds	Springfield Cardinals	Peoria Chiefs	Palm Beach Cardinals	FCL Cardinals	DSL Cardinals	
2027	Memphis Redbirds	Ozarks Springbirds	Peoria Chiefs	Palm Beach Cardinals	FCL Cardinals	DSL Cardinals	
