= F. Clarence Buck =

- Born: c. 1843; Hartford, Connecticut
- Died: July 15, 1905 (aged 61–62); Mountain Home, Tennessee
- Burial place: Mountain Home National Cemetery
- Military career
- Allegiance: United States of America
- Branch: United States Army
- Service years: August 17, 1862 to June 16, 1865
- Rank: Corporal
- Unit: 21st Regiment Connecticut Volunteer Infantry - Company A
- Conflicts: Battle of Chaffin's Farm
- Awards: Medal of Honor

Frederick Clarence Buck (c. 1843 – July 15, 1905) was a United States soldier who fought with the Union Army as a member of the 21st Connecticut Infantry Regiment during the American Civil War. He received his nation's highest award for bravery during combat, the U.S. Medal of Honor, for his actions during the Battle of Chaffin's Farm in Virginia on September 29, 1864. That award was conferred on April 6, 1865.

== Early years ==
Born in Hartford, Connecticut, in about 1843, Frederick Clarence Buck was, for a number of years, a resident of the community of Windsor, Connecticut.

== Civil War ==
Enlisting for Civil War military service during the summer of 1862, Buck enrolled on August 17 at Windsor, Connecticut, and officially mustered in as a private with Company A of the 21st Connecticut Volunteer Infantry. Assigned initially to the Union's Army of the Potomac, he and his fellow 21st Connecticut Volunteers fought in the Battle of Fredericksburg from December 12–15 of that year. While engaged in Burnside's "Mud March", Buck was promoted to the rank of corporal on January 20, 1863. He and his regiment then participated in the Siege of Suffolk that spring, provost and guard duty near Portsmouth and Newport News that summer, fall and winter. Part of the Union's expedition along Virginia's James River, which launched in late January 1864, the 21st Connecticut Volunteers then passed through Fort Powhatan and Smithfield before heading for North Carolina, where they were on duty at New Bern (February 12), Plymouth, Washington and Blount's Creek before returning to Portsmouth, Virginia in late April. Attached to the Union forces participating in operations against Petersburg and Richmond for much of the spring and summer, they were involved at Swift Creek, Fort Darling, the Battle of Drewry's Bluff, Bermuda Hundred, and White House before fighting in battles near Cold Harbor for much of June and in the trench warfare at Bermuda Hundred from late August through late September 1864.

It was during this latter period that Buck performed the act that earned him his U.S. Medal of Valor. Wounded during the Battle of Chaffin's Farm near New Market Heights on September 29, he "refused to leave the field until the fight closed." Roughly six months later, in March 1865, he was commissioned as a first lieutenant. Having returned to his regiment after recuperating from his battle wounds, he continued to serve with his regiment until it mustered out and returned home to New England. According to The New York Times, Buck and his fellow 21st Connecticut Volunteers traveled to New Haven, Connecticut by train on June 20 after having arrived in New York City the night before:

The Twenty-first belonged to the Third Brigade, Third Division of the Twenty-fourth Army Corps, and was among the first troops to outer Richmond. On their march down Broadway some of the officers were presented boquets [sic] and the regiment was loudly cheered. At the Battery barracks the soldiers were gladdened by a plentiful supply of strawberries furnished them by Col. ALMY, State Agent.

== Post-war life ==
In 1890, Buck resided at 26 Emerald Street in Boston, Massachusetts.

Suffering from heart disease in his later years, Buck was admitted to the Mountain Branch of the U.S. National Homes for Disabled Volunteer Soldiers in Johnson City, Tennessee on March 13, 1905. The hospital ledger noted that he had been a 61-year-old, unmarried laborer and member of the Protestant faith residing in Patten, Maine prior to his admission, and that he was 5' tall with brown hair, hazel eyes and a dark complexion. No next of kin were entered in the field for "nearest living relative".

He died at the Soldiers' Home in Mountain Home, Tennessee on July 15, 1905, and was laid to rest with military honors in grave number nine in the first row of section F at the Mountain Home National Cemetery.

== Medal of Honor citation ==
Although wounded, refused to leave the field until the fight closed.

== See also ==
- List of American Civil War Medal of Honor recipients: A–F
