= Arthur Dutton =

Arthur Dutton may refer to:

- Arthur Henry Dutton (1838–1864), American soldier
- Arthur Brandreth Scott Dutton (1876–1932), Royal Navy officer
