= William Hubbell =

William Hubbell may refer to:

- William Spring Hubbell (1801–1873), politician
- William Stone Hubbell (1837–1930), U.S. Army captain
- Bill Hubbell (1897–1980), baseball pitcher
