= Leo Shoals =

American baseball player and manager (1916–1999)

Leo "Muscle" Sholes
- First baseman / Manager
- Born: October 3, 1916; Camden-on-Gauley, West Virginia
- Died: February 23, 1999 (aged 82); Abingdon, Virginia
- Batted: Left Threw: Left

MiLB statistics
- Batting average: .337
- Hits: 2,125
- Home runs: 362
- Runs batted in: 1,529

Teams
- As player: Monessen Cardinals (1937); New Iberia Cardinals (1938); Albuquerque Cardinals (1938); Johnson City Cardinals (1939); Tyler Trojans (1940); El Dorado Oilers (1940–1941); Clarksdale Ginners (1941); Marshall Tigers (1941); Kingsport Cherokees (1946–1947); Charlotte Hornets (1948); Chattanooga Lookouts (1948); Reidsville Luckies (1949–1950); Columbia Reds (1950); Kingsport Cherokees (1951); Rock Hill Chiefs (1952); Kingsport Cherokees (1953–1955); Knoxville Smokies (1954); As manager: Kingsport Cherokees (1953–1955)

Career highlights and awards
- Appalachian League champion (1951); Carolina League MVP (1949); Appalachian League Triple Crown winner (1951); 3× Appalachian League batting champion (1939, 1947, 1951); 5× Appalachian League home run champion (1939, 1946, 1947, 1951, 1955); 2× Appalachian League RBI champion (1951, 1955); Carolina League RBI Champion (1949); Carolina League runs scored champion (1949); Carolina League's 50th Anniversary team; Northeast Tennessee Sports Hall of Fame; MiLB Records: Carolina League single season home run record with 55

Lloyd Cleveland "Muscle" Sholes Jr. (October 3, 1916 – February 23, 1999) was an American baseball player who was sometimes called "the Babe Ruth of the minor leagues."

== Professional baseball career ==
=== Minor leagues ===
Shoals made his professional debut in 1937 in the Pennsylvania State League for the St. Louis Cardinals organization. A muscular 220-pounder, Shoals quickly established himself as a formidable slugger, earning him the nickname "Muscle Shoals" after the northern Alabama town by that name. In 1939, playing for the Johnson City Cardinals in the Appalachian League, he hit .365, with 16 home runs. Two years later, he hit 26 home runs in the Cotton States League.

In 1946 and 1947, Shoals played for Kingsport of the Appalachian League, where he batted .333 and .387. His only full year in the Carolina League was in 1949, and he hit 55 home runs for the Reidsville Luckies, still a league record and not seriously challenged since Tolia "Tony" Solaita's 49 homers in 1968. Shoals also led the league in runs batted in and missed the batting title and Triple Crown by only two percentage points. The highlight of his season was a three home run, 15 total-base game against Greensboro on June 12. In his last at-bat, Shoals lined a single off the wall, only inches from his fourth homer. No Carolina League player has ever hit four home runs in a game.

Late in the season, the St. Louis Browns offered to bring Shoals up to the majors. He declined for several reasons, including his wife's pregnancy and effectively having to take a pay cut, as he was the beneficiary of so many passed hats, $20 handshakes, and merchant discounts that he couldn't afford to leave.

The Cincinnati Reds drafted Shoals and signed him to a minor league contract in 1950; he was sent to Columbia, South Carolina, of the South Atlantic League. Shoals subsequently disappeared for several games on the road trip to Jacksonville, Florida. When he finally showed up, he was released. Reidsville signed him for the remainder of the season, but he batted only .224 in 116 at-bats. Shoals finished his career back in Kingsport. When he retired after the 1955 season, his career minor league stats included a .337 batting average, 362 home runs, and 1,529 runs batted in.

== Post-professional baseball ==
After retirement from professional baseball Shoals worked for the Olin Mathieson Chemical Company, serving as a player-manager (mainly pinch-hitting) for a semi-pro club in Saltville called the Alkalies.

== Legacy ==

In 2004, the Washington County Park Authority and the Washington County Department of Recreation dedicated a park in his memory.
