= Wallace A. Beckwith =

Soldier in American Civil War

- Born: February 28, 1843; New London, Connecticut
- Died: November 22, 1929 (aged 86); Waterford, Connecticut
- Burial place: Jordan Cemetery, Waterford, New London County, Connecticut
- Military career
- Allegiance: United States
- Branch: United States Army
- Rank: Private
- Unit: 21st Regiment Connecticut Volunteer Infantry - Company F
- Conflicts: Battle of Fredericksburg
- Awards: Medal of Honor

Private Wallace A. Beckwith (February 28, 1843 – November 22, 1929) was an American soldier who fought in the American Civil War. Beckwith was awarded the country's highest award for bravery during combat, the Medal of Honor, for his action at Fredericksburg, Virginia during the Battle of Fredericksburg on December 13, 1862. He was honored with the award on February 15, 1897.

== Biography ==
Beckwith enlisted at New London, Connecticut. For his role in the Battle of Fredericksburg between December 11 and 15, 1862 Beckwith became one of five other Connecticut soldiers of the 21st Connecticut Infantry who were awarded the Medal of Honor for action during the Civil War.

== Medal of Honor citation ==
Gallantly responded to a call for volunteers to man a battery, serving with great heroism until the termination of the engagement.

== See also ==
- List of American Civil War Medal of Honor recipients: A–F
