= 21st Connecticut Infantry Regiment =

- Active: September 5, 1862 - June 16, 1865
- Country: United States
- Allegiance: Union
- Branch: Infantry
- Engagements: Battle of Fredericksburg; Burnside's "Mud March"; Siege of Suffolk; Battle of Drewry's Bluff; Battle of Cold Harbor; Siege of Petersburg; Second Battle of Petersburg; Battle of Chaffin's Farm; Appomattox Campaign

The 21st Connecticut Infantry Regiment was an infantry regiment that served in the Union Army during the American Civil War.

== Service ==
The 21st Connecticut Infantry Regiment was organized at Norwich, Connecticut, on September 20, 1862, to serve for three years, under the command of Colonel Arthur H. Dutton.

The regiment was attached to 2nd Brigade, 3rd Division, IX Corps, Army of the Potomac, to January 1863. 3rd Brigade, 3rd Division, IX Corps, to April 1863. 3rd Brigade, 2nd Division, VII Corps, Department of Virginia, to July 1863. 3rd Brigade, Getty's Division, Portsmouth, Virginia, Department of Virginia and North Carolina, to October 1863. Heckman's Command, Newport News, Virginia, Department of Virginia and North Carolina, to February 1864. Defenses of New Bern, North Carolina, Department of Virginia and North Carolina, to March 1864. Sub-District of the Pamlico, North Carolina, Department of Virginia and North Carolina, to May 1864. 3rd Brigade, 1st Division, XVIII Corps, Department of Virginia and North Carolina, to December 1864. 3rd Brigade, 3rd Division, XXIV Corps, Department of Virginia, to June 1865.

The 21st Connecticut Infantry mustered out of service June 16, 1865.

== Detailed service ==
Left Connecticut for Washington, D.C., September 11. Duty at Arlington Heights, Virginia, Defenses of Washington, D.C., November 1862. March to Falmouth, Virginia, November 7–19. Battle of Fredericksburg, December 12–15. Burnside's 2nd Campaign, "Mud March," January 20–24, 1863. Moved to Newport News, Virginia, February 6–9, then to Suffolk, Virginia, March 13. Siege of Suffolk April 12 – May 4. Chuckatuck and Reed's Ferry, Nansemond River, May 3. Siege of Suffolk raised May 4. Reconnaissance to Chickahominy June 9–16. Moved to Portsmouth, Virginia, June 16. Provost and guard duty at Portsmouth and Norfolk November 10. Moved to Newport News November 10, and duty there February 1864. Expedition up the James River to Fort Powhatan January 24–25. Smithfield February 1. Moved to Morehead City, North Carolina, February 3, then to New Bern February 12, and duty there, Plymouth, and Washington, North Carolina, April. Near Blount's Creek April 5. Moved to Portsmouth, Virginia, April 28. Butler's operations on south side of the James River and against Petersburg and Richmond May 10–28. Swift Creek, or Arrow field Church, May 10. Operations against Fort Darling May 12–16. Battle of Drewry's Bluff May 14–16. At Bermuda Hundred May 17–27. Moved to White House, then to Cold Harbor May 27–31. Battles about Cold Harbor June 1–12. Before Petersburg June 15–18. Siege operations against Petersburg and Richmond June 16, 1864 to April 2, 1865. Hare's Hill June 24–28, 1864. In the trenches at Bermuda Hundred August 25 – September 27, 1864. Chaffin's Farm, New Market Heights, September 28–30. Fair Oaks October 27–28. Duty in trenches before Richmond March, 1865. Expedition to Fredericksburg March 5–8, and up the Potomac River March 11–13. Moved to White House March 13–18, then to Signal Hilt, before Richmond, March 24–26. Occupation of Richmond April 3. Moved to Columbia April 28, and duty there June.

== Casualties ==
The regiment lost a total of 175 men during service; 5 officers and 55 enlisted men killed or mortally wounded; 1 officer and 114 enlisted men died of disease.

== Commanders ==
- Colonel Arthur H. Dutton
- Lieutenant Colonel Thomas F. Burpee - commanded during Bermuda Hundred Campaign and Cold Harbor, promoted posthumously to colonel
- Lieutenant Colonel James F. Brown - commanded during the Appomattox Campaign
- Major Hiram B. Crosby - commanded during the Siege of Suffolk

== Notable members ==
- Private Wallace A. Beckwith, Company F - Medal of Honor recipient for action at the Battle of Fredericksburg
- Corporal F. Clarence Buck, Company A - Medal of Honor recipient for action at the Battle of Chaffin's Farm
- Captain William Stone Hubbell, Company A - Medal of Honor recipient for action at the Battle of Chaffin's Farm
- Corporal John Gideon Palmer, Company F - Medal of Honor recipient for action at the Battle of Fredericksburg

== See also ==
- Connecticut in the American Civil War
- List of Connecticut Civil War units
