= Howie Nunn =

American baseball player (1935–2012)

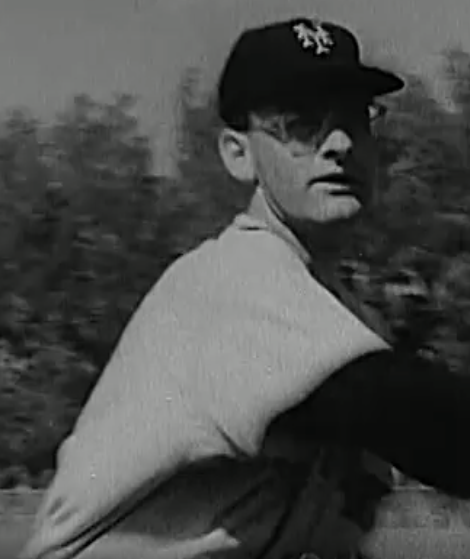
- Nunn with the New York Mets during spring training in 1962
- Pitcher
- Born: October 18, 1935; Westfield, North Carolina, U.S.
- Died: February 17, 2012 (aged 76); Winston-Salem, North Carolina, U.S.
- Batted: Right Threw: Right

MLB debut
- April 11, 1959, for the St. Louis Cardinals

Last MLB appearance
- June 7, 1962, for the Cincinnati Reds

MLB statistics
- Win–loss record: 4–3
- Earned run average: 5.11
- Strikeouts: 50
- Innings pitched: 68 2/3
- Stats at Baseball Reference

Teams
- St. Louis Cardinals (1959); Cincinnati Reds (1961–1962)

Howard Ralph Nunn (October 18, 1935 – February 17, 2012) was an American professional baseball player. The right-handed pitcher appeared in Major League Baseball for the full 1961 season (although he was sidelined by a sore arm for part of the campaign), along with partial seasons in 1959 and 1962. He stood 6 feet (1.8 m) tall and weighed 173 pounds (78 kilograms) during his active career. Nunn was nicknamed "Perry" by his teammates due to his pleasant singing voice.

Nunn entered baseball in 1954 after signing with the St. Louis Cardinals, and was very successful at the minor league level. He compiled a 112–58 won/lost record in nine minor league seasons, including a 23–7 season in the Class C California League, an 18-win year with the Johnson City Cardinals in the Class D Appalachian League, and a 16-victory campaign in the Double-A Texas League. In 1960, he posted a 1.99 earned run average in the Triple-A International League and overall had a career minor-league ERA of 3.38 in 1,463 innings pitched.

As a Major Leaguer, Nunn won four of seven decisions in 46 games pitched, all in relief, with an ERA of 5.11. In 68 2/3 innings pitched, he allowed 73 hits and 42 bases on balls, striking out 50.

He was a teammate (and, briefly, roommate) of Jim Brosnan on the 1959 Cardinals and 1961 Cincinnati Reds, and appears in Brosnan's memoirs The Long Season and Pennant Race. Nunn worked in 24 games for the National League champion Reds in 1961, but did not appear in the World Series. He spent spring training with the 1962 New York Mets — the inaugural season for that expansion team — but was returned to the Reds' organization before the regular season began.
