= Cleveland Counts =

- 1911–1913; Cleveland, Tennessee

Minor league affiliations
- Class: Class D (1911–1913)
- League: Appalachian League (1911–1913)

Major league affiliations
- Team: Unaffiliated (1911–1913)

Minor league titles
- League titles (0): None

Team data
- Name: Cleveland Counts (1911–1913)
- Ballpark: Unknown (1911–1913)

Buck Thrasher played all three seasons with the Counts.

The Cleveland Counts were a Minor League Baseball team that played in the Class D Appalachian League from 1911 to 1913. They were located in Cleveland, Tennessee. Team president Walter E. Rodgers surrendered the franchise to the league on June 4, 1912, after which it was transferred to Morristown, Tennessee, as the Morristown Jobbers.

== History ==
The Counts were formed as charter members of the Appalachian League in 1911. They played their first game on May 22, a 6–1 loss to the Johnson City Soldiers, before a home crowd of around 500 people. After six further loses, the Counts recorded their first win on May 30, defeating the Knoxville Appalachians, 2–1. Cleveland ended their inaugural season in fifth place, out of six teams, with a 39–56 (.411) record. On August 21, 1912, James Gudger pitched a 2–0 no-hitter against Johnson City. The 1912 team improved to 51–51 (.500), a fourth place finish.

On June 4, 1913, team and league president Walter E. Rodgers surrendered the Counts to the league fearing the circuit would soon collapse due to the recent withdrawal of the Bristol Boosters. The league operated the team until it was transferred to Morristown, Tennessee, as the Morristown Jobbers on June 7. Cleveland played its final games on May 30 as part of a doubleheader with the Rome Romans, winning the first game, 8–0, and losing the second, 6–0. The four remaining games of the series were rained out. The Counts were in second place at 10–8 as of June 4. Combined, the Cleveland/Morristown team finished third at 55–46 (.545).

The city did not field another professional baseball team until the Cleveland Manufacturers joined the Appalachian League in 1921.

== Season-by-season results ==
Season	Regular season				Postseason			Ref.
Season	Record	Win %	Finish	GB	Record	Win %	Result	Ref.
1911	39–56	.411	5th	20	—	—	Result	—
1912	51–51	.500	4th	7	—	—	—	
1913	10–8	.556	DNF	DNF	—	—	—	
Totals	100–115	.465	—	—	—	—	—	—

== Notable players ==
Seven Counts also played at least one game in Major League Baseball during their careers. These players and their seasons with Cleveland were:

- Davey Crockett (1911–1912)
- Tiny Graham (1913)
- Dan Griner (1912)
- Harry Hedgpeth (1911)
- Cliff Markle (1913)
- Buck Thrasher (1911–1913)
- Fritz Von Kolnitz (1913)
