= Ollie Vanek =

American baseball player (1908–2000)

Vanek

Ollie Charles Vanek (August 23, 1908 — June 29, 2000) was an American professional baseball player, manager and scout. He is best known as the talent-spotter who discovered future Baseball Hall of Famer Stan Musial for the St. Louis Cardinals and encouraged the team to switch Musial from his initial position, a left-handed pitcher, to the outfield — paving the way for Musial's brilliant career as a batsman.

Vanek was an outfielder and third baseman during his minor league playing career from 1930–32 and 1937–46, batting .312 in 1,195 games. In 1937, Vanek was the player-manager of the Monessen Cardinals of the Class D Pennsylvania State Association, one of the many teams in the Cardinals' extensive farm system. Musial, a 16-year-old high-schooler from nearby Donora, Pennsylvania, tried out for Vanek before a game and Vanek recommended that the parent club sign him. The following season, Musial began his professional career in the Cardinal system as a southpaw pitcher and part-time outfielder.

When a sore shoulder (suffered making a catch in the field) derailed Musial's mound career, Vanek, in 1941, made him a full-time outfielder for his Class C Springfield Cardinals of the Western Association, and Musial responded by hitting .379 with 26 home runs in little more than half a season. By the end of 1941, he had begun his legendary Major League Baseball career with the big-league Cardinals. "Ollie was an excellent hitter and a good player," Musial said upon Vanek's death in St. Louis at age 91 in 2000. " ... He was a good man and responsible for my start in St. Louis."

Vanek managed Cardinal farm teams for 12 seasons, 1937–48, then became a scout for St. Louis, and, later, the New York Mets, where he won the Gil Hodges Award for Meritorious Service.
