= Mountain Branch, National Home for Disabled Volunteer Soldiers =

- U.S. National Register of Historic Places
- U.S. National Historic Landmark District
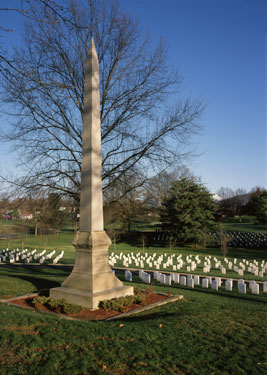
- The Brownlow Monument in the Mountain Home National Cemetery

- Location within Tennessee Location within the United States
- Location: Lamont St., Johnson City, Tennessee
- Coordinates: 36°18′38″N 82°22′24″W
- NRHP reference No.: 11000560

Significant dates
- Added to NRHP: June 17, 2011
- Designated NHLD: June 17, 2011

The Mountain Branch, National Home for Disabled Volunteer Soldiers was an old soldiers' home opened in 1904 in Mountain Home, Johnson City, Tennessee. Its site has since been taken over by the United States Department of Veterans Affairs, and is home to the Mountain Home National Cemetery and the James H. Quillen VA Center. Also known as the Mountain Home, its campus was designated a National Historic Landmark District in 2011, as a well-preserved example of an early 20th-century veterans care facility.

== Description and history ==
The National Home for Disabled Volunteer Soldiers (NHDVS) was created by the United States federal government in the waning days of the American Civil War, as a means to provide needed support for Union Army veterans of the war. Between 1865 and 1930 a total of eleven branches of this service were founded. The Mountain Branch was established in 1901 by the NHDVS through the efforts of Congressman Walter P. Brownlow. Land for the campus was purchased soon after the enabling legislation was signed, and major development took place between then and 1903, when the unfinished facility opened its doors. The campus was designed by New York City architect Joseph H. Freelander, a proponent of the Beaux Arts style of architecture, and landscape designer Carl Andersen. The many surviving buildings that make up the core of the present VA campus are in the Beaux Arts style. The complex received notice in architectural publications, including criticism that it was overly exotic for its comparatively rural location.

The NHDVS was absorbed in the Veterans Administration (now the United States Department of Veterans Affairs) in 1930, at which time another round of construction took place. A third major round of building occurred in the 1970s and 1980s, after the VA developed a master plan for the site.

The Mountain Home National Cemetery was established in 1903, in a manner similar to other national cemeteries located adjacent to NHDVS facilities.

Most of the surviving campus continues to be used by the Department of Veterans of Affairs as the James H. Quillen VA Center.

== See also ==
- List of National Historic Landmarks in Tennessee
- National Register of Historic Places listings in Washington County, Tennessee
