= Jack Ryan (pitcher) =

American baseball player (1884–1949)

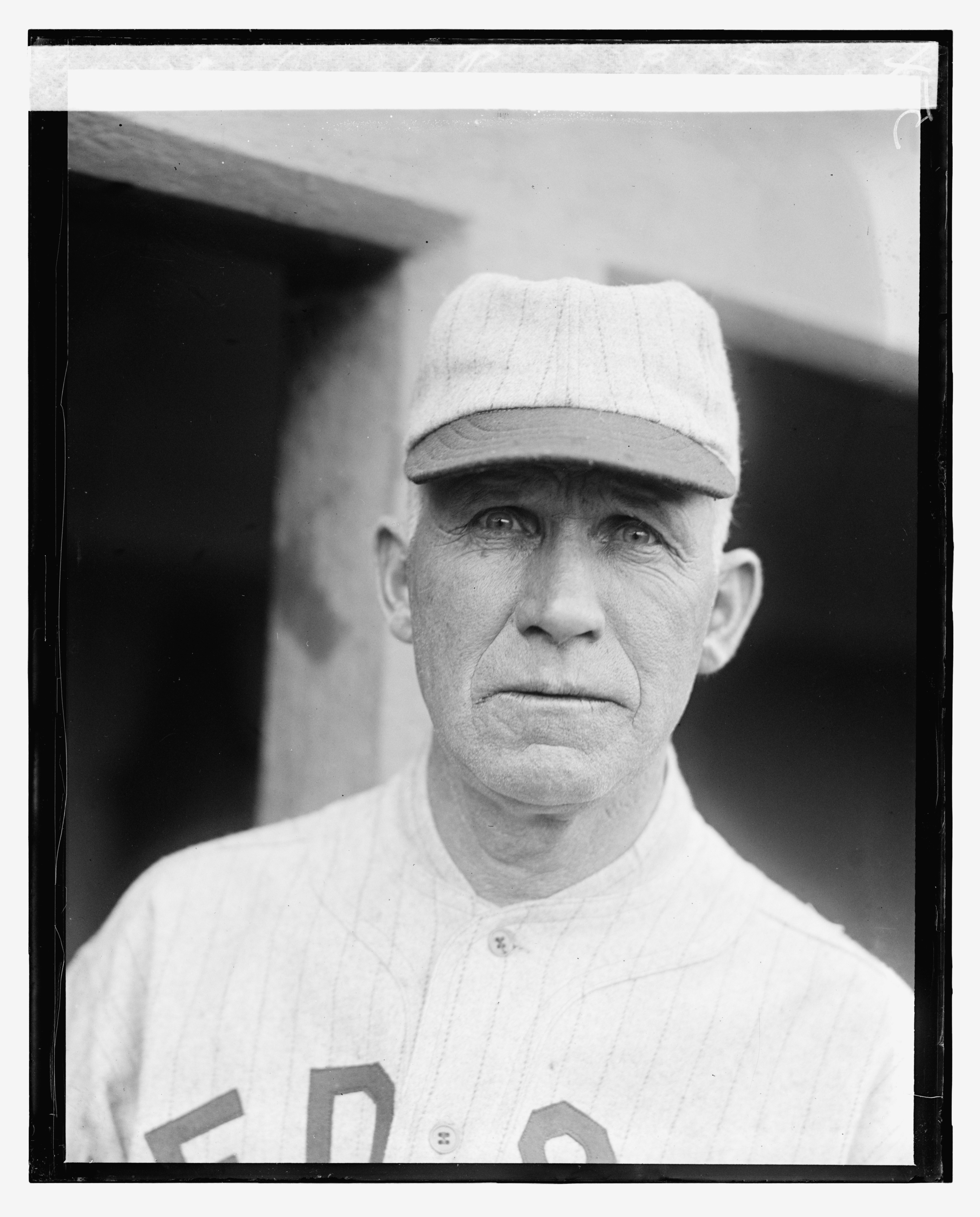
- Ryan in 1924
- Pitcher
- Born: September 19, 1884; Lawrenceville, Illinois, U.S.
- Died: October 16, 1949 (aged 65); Handsboro, Mississippi, U.S.
- Batted: Right Threw: Right

MLB debut
- July 2, 1908, for the Cleveland Naps

Last MLB appearance
- May 9, 1911, for the Brooklyn Dodgers

MLB statistics
- Win–loss record: 5–5
- Earned run average: 2.88
- Strikeouts: 32
- Stats at Baseball Reference

Teams
- Cleveland Naps (1908); Boston Red Sox (1909); Brooklyn Dodgers (1911)

Jack Ryan (September 19, 1884 – October 16, 1949) was an American pitcher in Major League Baseball between 1908 and 1911.

Ryan was involved in a trade on February 16, 1909, in which he, Charlie Chech, and $12,500 went from the Cleveland Naps to the Boston Red Sox in exchange for future Hall of Fame pitcher Cy Young. After his playing career, Ryan was a pitching coach for the Red Sox from 1923 to 1927.

Preceded by Jimmy Burke	Boston Red Sox Pitching coach 1923–1927	Succeeded by Jack Onslow
