= Dominican Summer League Cardinals =

- Santo Domingo

Minor league affiliations
- Class: Rookie
- League: Dominican Summer League
- Division: Boca Chica South

Major league affiliations
- Team: St. Louis Cardinals

Minor league titles
- League titles (0): None

Team data
- Name: Cardinals
- Ballpark: Las Américas Complex
- Owner(s)/ Operator(s): St. Louis Cardinals
- Manager: Fray Peniche

The Dominican Summer League Cardinals or DSL Cardinals are a rookie league affiliate of the St. Louis Cardinals based in the Dominican Republic. The team plays in the Boca Chica South division of the Dominican Summer League.

== History ==
The team first came into existence in 1989 as a shared affiliate of the Pittsburgh Pirates and the New York Mets. In 1990, they shared an affiliation with the Houston Astros. From 1991 to 1993, they shared an affiliation with the Detroit Tigers and from 1994 to 1995, they shared an affiliation with the Philadelphia Phillies. The team became an independent Cardinals affiliate in 1996 and has remained so ever since, with the exception of the 2004 season during which team operations were suspended.

== Roster ==
Dominican Summer League Cardinals roster
| Players | | Coaches/Other |
| Pitchers: 38 Jarol Baez; -- Andrew Bolivar; 47 Emisael Carrera; -- Gabriel Chinchilla; -- Michael Correa; 41 Xavier Cruz; -- Branneli Franco; -- Jesus Garcia; -- Juan Garcia; -- Daniel Gomez; 43 Justin Hernandez; 33 Reiner Lopez; 36 Bernard Mack; -- Guanchi Martinez; 46 Jefferson Moran; 39 Brailyn Paulino; 35 Kener Perez ‡; 57 Keiverson Ramirez; -- Alan Reyes; -- Ryan Rodriguez; 28 Giovanni Vargas; -- Earle Zulueta | Catchers: 31 Paulo Asprilla; -- Juan Pablo Cabrera; -- Jhonny Chaparro; Infielders: -- Michael Cordero ‡; -- Sebastian Dos Santos; 3 Yoerny Junco; -- Cristofer Lebron; -- Yairo Padilla; -- Rainiel Rodriguez; 19 Daniel Rojas; -- Christian Saez; 12 Bracewell Taveras; Outfielders: 13 Hancel Almonte; -- Brayan Amoroso; 15 Andru Arthur; -- Edward Guribe; -- Yaxson Lucena; -- Royelny Strop; 16 Facundo Velasquez | Manager: 11 Fray Peniche; Coaches: 88 Luis Cruz (hitting); 87 Wesslye Cuas (hitting); 89 Wilman Madera (pitching); 54 Bill Villanueva (pitching); 7-day injured list * On St. Louis Cardinals 40-man roster ~ Development list # Rehab assignment ∞ Reserve list ‡ Restricted list § Suspended list † Temporarily inactive list Roster updated February 26, 2025; Transactions → More rosters: MiLB • Dominican Summer League → St. Louis Cardinals minor league players |
