= Jim Mooney (baseball) =

American baseball player (1906–1979)

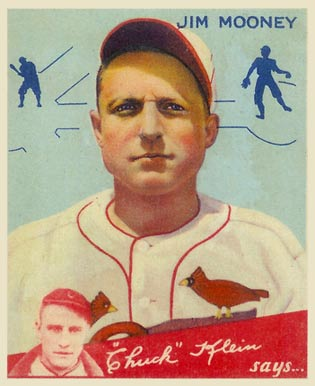
- 1934 Goudey baseball card
- Pitcher
- Born: September 4, 1906; Mooresburg, Tennessee, U.S.
- Died: April 27, 1979 (aged 72); Johnson City, Tennessee, U.S.
- Batted: Right Threw: Left

MLB debut
- August 14, 1931, for the New York Giants

Last MLB appearance
- August 27, 1934, for the St. Louis Cardinals

MLB statistics
- Win–loss record: 17–20
- Earned run average: 4.25
- Strikeouts: 116
- Stats at Baseball Reference

Teams
- New York Giants (1931–1932); St. Louis Cardinals (1933–1934)

Career highlights and awards
- World Series champion (1934)

Jim Irving Mooney (September 4, 1906 – April 27, 1979) was an American Major League Baseball player who played pitcher from 1931 to 1934 for the St. Louis Cardinals and New York Giants.

In his 4 season of Major League Baseball (MLB) he compiled a 17–20 win–loss record. He was a member of the World Series championship team in 1934.

During World War II, Mooney served as an officer in the United States Navy. He was a professor and coach at East Tennessee State University and was inducted into their athletic Hall of Fame in 1977.
