= Arthur Henry Dutton =

American Civil War officer (1838–1864)

- Born: November 13, 1838; Wallingford, Connecticut, US
- Died: June 5, 1864 (aged 25); Baltimore, Maryland, US
- Burial place: Arlington National Cemetery Arlington, Virginia
- Military career
- Allegiance: (United States) United States; Union
- Branch: United States Army; Union Army
- Service years: 1861–1864
- Rank: Colonel; Brevet Brigadier General
- Commands: 21st Connecticut Infantry
- Conflicts: American Civil War

Arthur Henry Dutton (November 13, 1838 – June 5, 1864) was an American career soldier. A trained military engineer and high graduate of West Point, he served mostly as an infantry officer in the Union Army, fighting within the Eastern Theater during the American Civil War.

Dutton also helped raise and became the first commander of the 21st Connecticut Volunteer Infantry in late 1862. He was mortally wounded in action at Bermuda Hundred in late May 1864, and was posthumously breveted a brigadier general.

== Early life ==
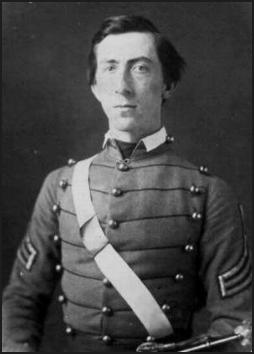
Dutton in his cadet's uniform while attending West Point.

Dutton was born in 1838 in Wallingford, Connecticut, to Samuel Dutton (1806–1851) and his wife Emily (Curtis) Dutton (1805–1875). During the last year and a half of his West Point studies and the first six months of his Civil War service, Arthur Dutton carried on a nearly two-year long torrid letter writing campaign between himself and the woman whose words in national magazines he fell in love with: noted and popular poet/author Hattie Tyng Hattie Tyng Griswold of Wisconsin.

Hattie replied to Dutton's often very long letters and seemed equally entranced by their potential relationship... but the Civil War intervened and the two would never meet.

Hattie Tyng went on to marry another man in 1863 and Arthur, just a few months later was married to Marion Sands Franklin (1840–1914); the couple had one son, also named Arthur H. Dutton, born August 6, 1864, two months after his father's death from a mortal wounding. Col. Dutton's funeral was held at the same church in “Washington City” where he and Marion were married exactly one year earlier.

Dutton's brother Clarence Edward (1841–1912) also was a soldier, serving as a major in his brother's Regiment during the American Civil War.

In the fall of 1857, while Dutton was in his first term as a student at Yale University he received a letter from then Secretary of War Jefferson Davis informing Arthur he had been accepted into West Point Military Academy United States Military Academy where he would immediately rise to number one in his class. However —- possibly in part due to devoting time to his vociferous love letter writing campaign to author Hattie Tyng —- he would eventually drop to third out of 34 cadets upon graduation on June 24, 1861, behind top of class Patrick O’Rorke Patrick O'Rorke who would die on Little Round Top, Gettysburg and far ahead of that West Point class's “goat,” bottom of the class George Armstrong Custer who would be killed at the Battle of the Little Bighorn.

Dutton's high class placement from West Point allowed him to enter the prestigious U.S. Army Corps of Engineers, and he was appointed as brevet second lieutenant the same day he graduated. On August 3 Dutton was promoted to full Second Lieutenant in the regular army.

== Civil War service and death ==
In the early part of the war he served as a staff officer of fellow Nutmeg Stater Brig. Gen. Joseph K. Mansfield —- who graduated 2nd in the West Point class of 1822 -— in Washington, D.C., and then he commanded the defenses of Fernandina, Florida. In the fall of 1862, Dutton began to form and train the volunteer 21st Connecticut Infantry Regiment in Norwalk. On September 5 he was commissioned the unit's colonel and commanding officer.

The 21st Connecticut — fielding most of its men from the eastern part of the state, including Dutton's brother and several of Dutton's cousins — was organized as part of the IX Corps, Army of the Potomac. He then brought his regiment to Washington on September 11, and by November they were posted to Arlington Heights in Virginia as part of the defenses of Washington. From November 7–19 Dutton and his regiment marched to Falmouth, Virginia, and that December they fought during the Battle of Fredericksburg.

For his actions during the Battle of Fredericksburg on December 13, Dutton was brevetted a major in the Regular Army, to date from the day of the battle. He then lead his regiment during the unsuccessful Mud March of January 20–24, 1863. Dutton then began exercising brigade command in the IX Corps in February, and he was promoted to First Lieutenant in the Regular Army on March 3. He next went to southeastern Virginia and participated in the siege of Suffolk that April and May. There Dutton led a brigade of the VII Corps, and for his actions during the efforts to hold Suffolk he was brevetted a lieutenant colonel in the Regular Army on March 3.

From January 14–February 16, 1864. he was stationed at Newport News, Virginia. Dutton next led a brigade in the XVIII Corps, Army of the James.

On May 26 Dutton was within Bermuda Hundred and was ordered to reconnoiter the opposing Confederate position with his brigade. Dutton advanced for about 2 miles and was on the skirmish line near Proctor's Creek, where he was hit mortally. He died of his wounds on June 5 in Baltimore, Maryland. That same day, June 5, 1864, was also the one-year anniversary of his marriage to Marion Franklin. Dutton is buried at Arlington National Cemetery in Virginia. His family also erected a cenotaph to his memory at the In Memoriam Cemetery in Wallingford, Connecticut, where his brother Clarence was also later buried. He was posthumously brevetted to the rank of Colonel in the Regular Army and to Brigadier General of Volunteers for his actions at Bermuda Hundred.

A testimonial to Dutton was given by one of his fellow officers:

Colonel Dutton dies from the effects of his wounds June 5th. He graduated at West Point in 1861, Kilpatrick, Custar, O’Rourke, Benjamin, and Farquhar being among his classmates. Bold and chivalrous, with a nice sense of honor, a judgment quick and decisive, an unwavering zeal in his chosen profession, he was in every respect a thorough soldier. By his companions in arms he will never be forgotten, and to them his last resting place will be as a shrine commemorating the friendships which not the rude shock of war, nor lapse of time, can blight or destroy.
