= Joe Price (outfielder) =

American baseball player (1897-1961)

- Center fielder
- Born: April 10, 1897; Milligan College, Tennessee, U.S.
- Died: January 15, 1961 (aged 63); Washington, D.C., U.S.
- Batted: Right Threw: Right

MLB debut
- September 5, 1928, for the New York Giants

Last MLB appearance
- September 5, 1928, for the New York Giants

MLB statistics
- Games played: 1
- At bats: 1
- Hits: 0
- Stats at Baseball Reference

Teams
- New York Giants (1928)

Joseph Preston Price (April 10, 1897 – January 15, 1961), nicknamed "Lumber", was an American Major League Baseball center fielder who played in one game for the New York Giants on September 5, 1928.

Price's contract was purchased by the Giants in late August 1928 on the condition that he be allowed to finish the season with the Greenville Spinners of the South Atlantic League.

Between 1921 and 1929, Price played in the minor leagues of the Southern United States where he was "extremely popular."

In 1934, Price headed the baseball department of a sports coaching school established in Tennessee and directed by Wallace Wade.
