= Cleveland Manufacturers =

Minor league baseball team in Tennessee, US (1921–1922)

- 1921–1922; Cleveland, Tennessee

Minor league affiliations
- Class: Class D (1921–1922)
- League: Appalachian League (1921–1922)

Major league affiliations
- Team: Unaffiliated (1921–1922)

Minor league titles
- League titles (0): None

Team data
- Name: Cleveland Manufacturers (1921–1922)
- Ballpark: Unknown (1921–1922)

The Cleveland Manufacturers were a Minor League Baseball team that played in the Class D Appalachian League from 1921 to 1922. They were located in Cleveland, Tennessee.

== History ==
Professional baseball was first played in Cleveland, Tennessee, by the Cleveland Counts, who were charter members of the Appalachian League from 1911 to 1913. During the 1913 season, the franchise was transferred to Morristown, Tennessee, as the Morristown Jobbers.

After a seven-year absence from the Appalachian League, the city returned with the Cleveland Manufacturers in 1921. They lost their May 12 Opening Day game versus the Knoxville Pioneers, 4–0, in a seven-inning rain-shortened game on the road. They won the next afternoon's game, defeating Knoxville, 7–3. The Manufacturers ended the season last of six teams with a 36–72 (.333) record.

On July 22, 1922, Tom Rich pitched a seven-inning no-hitter in the second game of a doubleheader against the Bristol State Liners, winning 4–0. The team played their last game on September 13, losing 6–4 to Knoxville. They placed third at 61–59 (.508) in their final season. Over both seasons, the Manufacturers' composite record was 97–131 (.425). Cleveland did not field another team in 1923.

== Season-by-season results ==
Season	Regular season				Ref.
Season	Record	Win %	Finish	GB	Ref.
1921	36–72	.333	6th	27 1/2	
1922	61–59	.508	3rd	6	
Totals	97–131	.425	—	—	—

== Notable players ==
Two Manufacturers also played at least one game in Major League Baseball during their careers. These players and their seasons with Cleveland were:

- George Kopshaw (1921)
- Tripp Sigman (1921)
