= William Stone Hubbell =

American Civil War Medal of Honor recipient

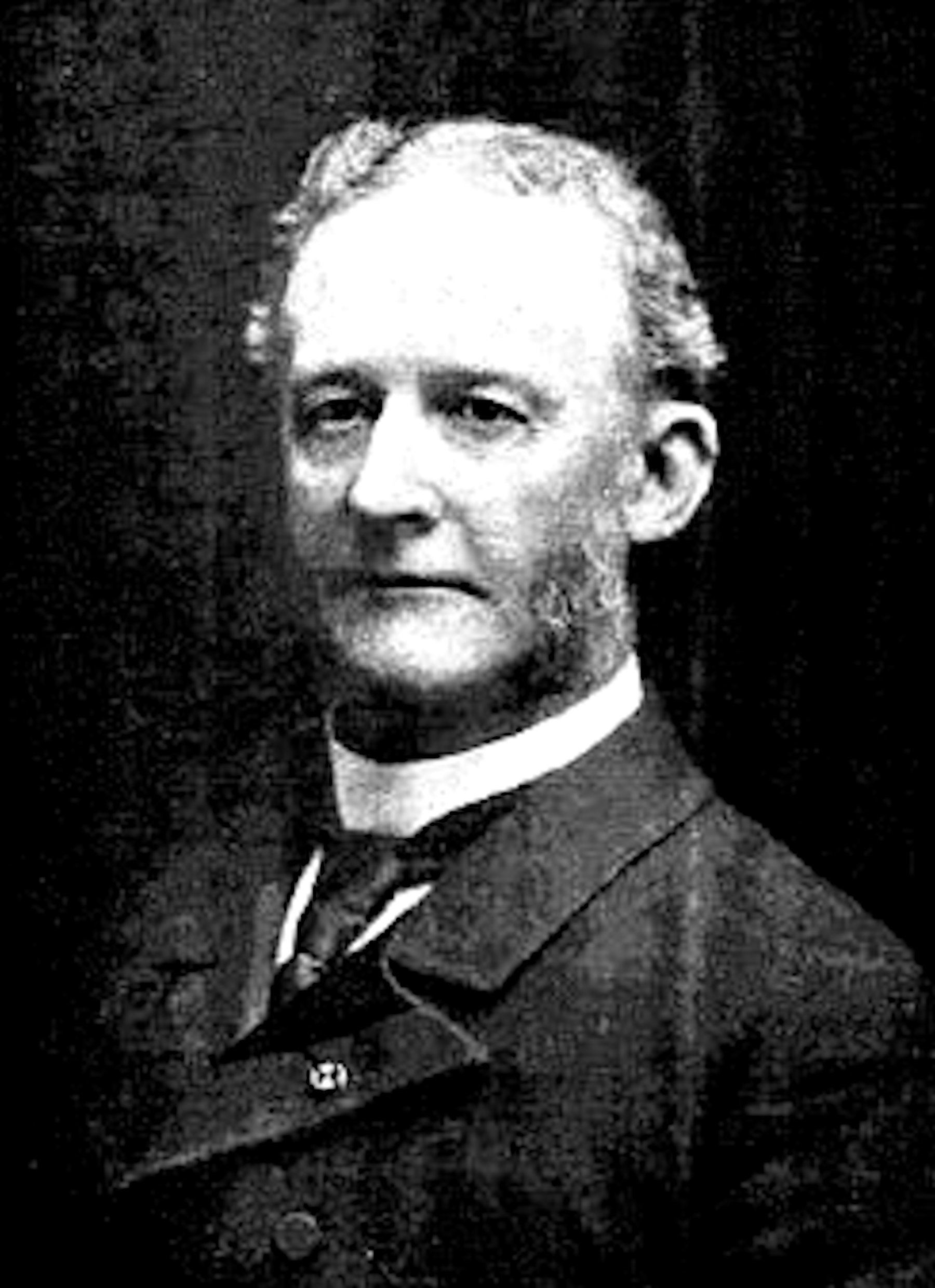
- Hubbell in c. 1899
- Born: April 19, 1837; Wolcottville, Connecticut, U.S.
- Died: August 28, 1930 (aged 93); Plymouth, Massachusetts, U.S.
- Burial place: Indian Hill Cemetery; Middletown, Connecticut, U.S.
- Alma mater: Yale University; Hamilton College (DD)
- Children: 3
- Military career
- Allegiance: United States; Union
- Branch: United States Army; Union Army
- Rank: Brevet major
- Unit: 21st Connecticut Volunteer Infantry Regiment
- Conflicts: American Civil War; Battle of Chaffin's Farm
- Awards: Medal of Honor

William Stone Hubbell (April 19, 1837 – August 28, 1930) was a United States Army captain during the American Civil War, and a recipient of the Medal of Honor.

== Early life ==
Hubbell was born in Wolcottville (later Torrington), Connecticut. He graduated from Yale University in 1858.

== Civil War ==
Hubbell entered army service at North Stonington, Connecticut.

Captain Hubbell served in Company A of the 21st Connecticut Infantry at the Battle of Chaffin's Farm. In that battle on September 30, 1864, at Fort Harrison, Virginia, he led out a small flanking party, engaged a Confederate force and at great risk captured a large number of prisoners. For this action, Hubbell was awarded the Medal of Honor on June 13, 1894. He was discharged in July 1865 as a captain and brevet major.

== Medal of Honor citation ==
Rank and organization: Captain, Company A, 21st Connecticut Infantry. Place and date: At Fort Harrison, Va., September 30, 1864. Entered service at: North Stonington, Conn. Born: April 19, 1837, Wolcottville, Conn. Date of issue: June 13, 1894.

Citation:

Led out a small flanking party and by a clash and at great risk captured a large number of prisoners.

== Religious education and career ==
From 1866 to 1868, Hubbell left the seminary. In 1868, he became assistant to the pastor of a church in Braintree, Massachusetts. He then worked at the First Congregational Church in Somerville for nine years. In 1881, he became pastor of North Presbyterian Church in Buffalo and remained there for 15 years. He studied at Andover Theological Seminary and graduated with a Doctor of Divinity from Hamilton College in 1884. From 1898 to 1911, he was general secretary of the New York Sabbath Commission. He then became a recording secretary. He was chaplain of the New York Commandery of the Military Order of the Loyal Legion from 1900 to 1916. He was also chaplain of the George Washington Post, Grand Army of the Republic.

== Personal life ==
Hubbell had a son and two daughters, DeWitt, Mary and Susan. He lived for a time in Plainfield, New Jersey, and had a summer home in Plymouth, Massachusetts.

Hubbell died on August 28, 1930, at his home in Plymouth. He was buried in Indian Hill Cemetery in Middletown, Connecticut.

== See also ==
- List of American Civil War Medal of Honor recipients: G–L
- William Spring Hubbell (1801–1873), American politician, congressman from New York
