= Mountain Home, Tennessee =

Place in Johnson City, Tennessee, US

Coordinates: 36°18′38″N 82°22′24″W

Mountain Home, zip code 37684, is a separate postal zone consisting of the grounds of the James H. Quillen VA hospital and Mountain Home National Cemetery, which also includes classrooms and administrative buildings of the East Tennessee State University James H. Quillen College of Medicine. It is entirely contained inside the city of Johnson City.
