= Mountain Home National Cemetery =

Veterans cemetery in Washington County, Tennessee

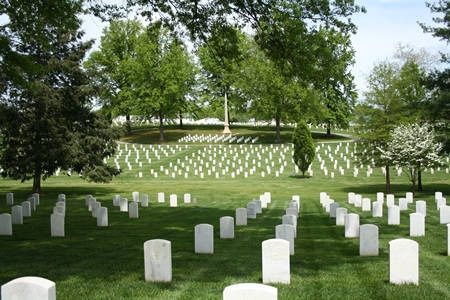
- Burial section at Mountain Home National Cemetery
- Interactive map of Mountain Home National Cemetery

Details
- Established: 1903
- Location: Mountain Home, Johnson City, Tennessee
- Country: United States
- Coordinates: 36°18′42″N 82°22′35″W
- Type: United States National Cemetery
- Style: French Renaissance-style buildings
- Owned by: U.S. Department of Veterans Affairs
- Size: 99.7 acres (40.3 ha)
- No. of graves: 17,000
- Website: Official
- Find a Grave: Mountain Home National Cemetery

Mountain Home National Cemetery is a United States National Cemetery located at Mountain Home, within Johnson City in Washington County, Tennessee. Administered by the United States Department of Veterans Affairs, it encompasses 99.7 acres (40.3 ha), and as of 2018, had over 17,000 interments.

== History ==
On the grounds of the Mountain Home Veterans Administration Center, the cemetery was established in 1903 as part of the National Home for Disabled Volunteer Soldiers, a federal old soldiers' home. The cemetery features over 14,000 graves highlighted by a monument to Congressman Walter Preston Brownlow, who petitioned the government and worked tirelessly to have the veteran's center created. It officially became a National Cemetery in 1973, and has primarily the interments of veterans who died while under care at the facility.

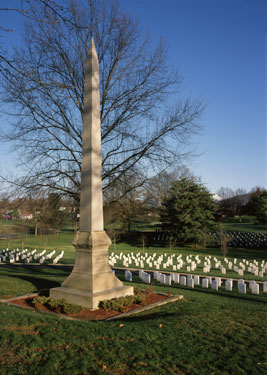
Brownlow Monument

== Notable interments ==
- Medal of Honor recipients
  - Lieutenant Frederick Clarence Buck (1843–1905), for action at the Battle of Chaffin's Farm during the Civil War
  - Sergeant Henry G. Buhrman (1844–1906), for action at the Battle of Vicksburg during the Civil War
  - Seaman Thomas Smith (1838–1905), for action during the Civil War
  - Staff Sergeant Junior James Spurrier (1922–1984), for action in World War II
- Others
  - Walter P. Brownlow (1851–1910), U.S. representative from Tennessee's 1st congressional district
  - George Maledon (1830–1911), the "Prince of Hangmen"
  - D. C. Stephenson (1891–1966), Ku Klux Klan Grand Dragon of the Indiana Klan; later convicted for the murder of Madge Oberholtzer
