= Monessen Indians =

- 1934–1937; Monessen, Pennsylvania

Minor league affiliations
- Class: Class D (1934–1937)
- League: Pennsylvania State Association (1934–1937)

Major league affiliations
- Team: St. Louis Cardinals (1937); Cincinnati Reds (1935); Cleveland Indians (1934, 1936)

Minor league titles
- League titles (1): 1935

Team data
- Name: Monessen Red Wings (1937); Monessen Reds (1935); Monessen Indians (1934, 1936)

The Monessen Indians was the predominant name of a minor league baseball team located in Monessen, Pennsylvania that played between 1934 and 1937 in the Pennsylvania State Association. Known as the Indians in 1934 and 1936, the team was named the Monessen Reds in 1935 and the Monessen Red Wings in 1937. The team was affiliated with the Cleveland Indians, the Cincinnati Reds and the St. Louis Cardinals throughout its history.

The team won the league title in 1935.

== Notable alumni ==
- George Binks
- Harry Craft
- Ed Fernandes
- Tommy Henrich
- Jack Kraus
- Joe Mack
- Mike McCormick
- Mike Palagyi
- Tommy Reis
- Al Rubeling
- Charley Stanceu
- Junior Thompson
