= Bluefield Blue–Grays =

- 1937–1955; (1937–1942, 1946–1955); Bluefield, Virginia

Minor league affiliations
- Class: Class D (1937–1942, 1946–1955)
- League: Mountain State League (1937–1942); Appalachian League (1946–1955)

Major league affiliations
- Team: Boston Braves (1946–1951); Washington Senators (1953); Boston Red Sox (1954–1955)

Minor league titles
- League titles (3): 1939; 1949; 1954
- Conference titles (3): 1949; 1950; 1954
- Wild card berths (7): 1937; 1939; 1940; 1941; 1947; 1948; 1951

Team data
- Name: Bluefield Blue–Grays (1937–1942, 1946–1955)
- Ballpark: Cain Field (1937–1938); Bowen Field (1939–1942, 1946–1955)

The Bluefield Blue–Grays were a minor league baseball team based in the neighboring border cities of Bluefield, Virginia, and Bluefield, West Virginia, USA.

The Bluefield Blue–Grays played as members of the Class D level Mountain State League from 1937 to 1942, when the league folded due to World War II. Following the War, the Blue–Grays resumed play as members of the Class D level Appalachian League from 1946 to 1955. The Blue–Grays won league championships in 1939, 1949 and 1954 and captured the Appalachian League pennant in 1950.

The Blue–Grays played as a minor league affiliate of the Boston Braves (1946–1951), Washington Senators (1953) and Boston Red Sox (1954–1955).

The Bluefield Blue–Grays hosted minor league games in both of the Bluefield cities. In 1939 the team began play in Bluefield, Virginia at the newly built Bowen Field, continuing play at the ballpark through 1955. The ballpark is still in use today within the Peters Park, which physically encompasses both states. Prior to Bowen Field, the Blue–Grays hosted home games during their first two seasons at Cain Field located in Bluefield, West Virginia. The Cain Field ballpark was also nicknamed Blue–Gray Field.

Baseball Hall of Fame member Travis Jackson was the manager of the Bluefield Blue–Grays during the 1951 season.

== History ==
=== Early Bluefield teams ===
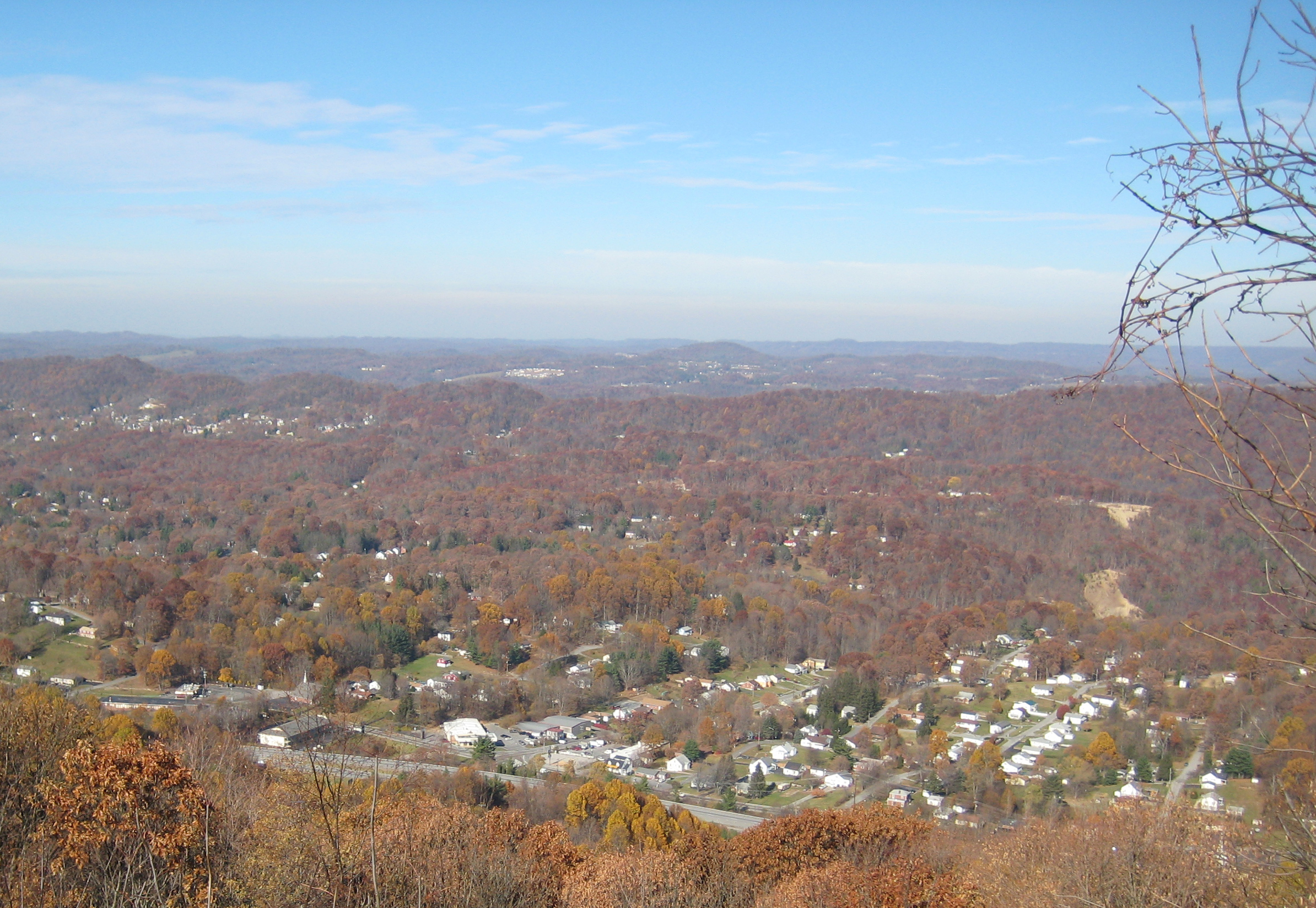
(2008) Bluefield, West Virginia.

Bluefield, Virginia first hosted minor league baseball in 1912, although for a very brief duration. There was a team placed in Bluefield for three days and two total games. During the season, on June 10, 1912, the Danville Red Sox, a member of the eight-team, Class C level Virginia League moved its franchise to Bluefield.

Prior to the move to Bluefield, the Danville, Virginia based Danville franchise also explored moving to Suffolk, Virginia. They moved to Bluefield, Virginia after a "guarantee" from the city that the team would not lose money. The guarantee sealed the approval for the move to Bluefield. However, other of the Virginia League members had immediate concerns that Bluefield was too far to travel for the league teams.

On June 13, 1912, the Bluefield team moved back to Danville, Virginia after a compiling a 1–1 record while briefly based in Bluefield. Shortly after their return to Danville, the Danville/Bluefield team folded for the season on June 15, 1912. The team had compiled a 16–29 overall record under manager Dave Gaston at the time that they folded. Neither Danville or Bluefield were members of the 1913 Virginia League, as the league reduced to six teams. The Lynchburg Shoemakers also did not return to the Virginia League in 1913.

In 1924, a Bluefield semi-professional baseball team called the "Blue–Grays" began play as a member of the Coalfield Baseball League. 1924 was also an historical year for the two cities, as the city of Bluefield, West Virginia was first named.

The direct foundation of the "Blue–Gray" nickname usage by the baseball team is unknown. It corresponds to a "blue grey" horse, referring to a Blue Roan horse or an aging Grey horse. The nickname also corresponds to a Blue-gray Gnatcatcher, a type of songbird native to the region. Historically, "Blue and Gray" is terminology used to distinguish between Union (blue) and Confederate (gray) armies during the American Civil War.

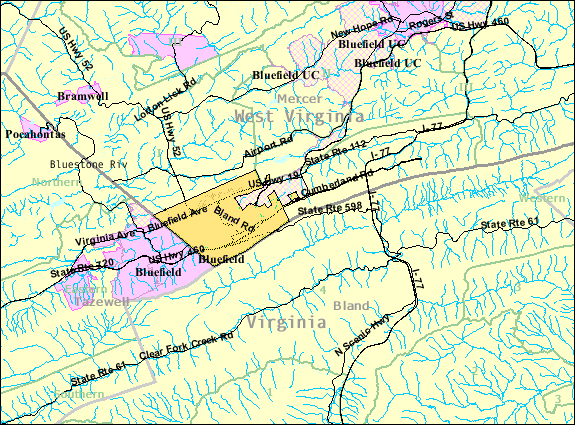
(2000) Bluefield region Census reference map. The two cities share the same name in bordering states.

The Bluefield region was first settled in 1777, before the Civil War separated the two states. Two local families, the Davidsons and Baileys, sold a portion of their land for the development of the Norfolk and Western Railway in 1882 and the city became the headquarters of the railway.

The city of Bluefield, West Virginia and their bordering neighbor, Bluefield, Virginia began sharing the same name in 1924. That year, the city of Graham, Virginia changed its name to Bluefield to match its neighboring city. A referendum was approved on June 10, 1924, for the name change from Graham to Bluefield by a vote of 287 to 223. The 2,700 resident city became Bluefield, Virginia and matched its larger neighbor (15,500) West Virginia city. After the referendum vote was officially passed, a mock wedding between residents of both cities was held as a sign of unity, with city officials from both cities present for the ceremony.

=== 1937: Mountain State League charter member ===
Bluefield was without minor league baseball until 1937, when the Bluefield Blue–Grays were founded, becoming the first minor league team fully established in Bluefield. The Blue–Grays became charter members of the newly formed, six-team, Class D level Mountain State League. As the league was formed, all charter league member teams were based in the state of West Virginia. Bluefield joined with the Beckley Bengals (Detroit Tigers affiliate), Huntington Boosters, Logan Indians, Welch Miners and Williamson Colts as the first members of the Mountain State League. Besides Beckley, all the other league teams were unaffiliated. The Mountain State League's first regular season schedule began with opening day games held on May 13, 1937. Ray Ryan served as the first league president and remained in the position until 1942.

Ernest Powell was named the manager of the Blue–Grays in their first season, his only season in professional baseball. The Bluefield Blue–Grays began play at Cain Field. In the two seasons that the Blue–Grays played at Cain Field, the ballpark was also nicknamed Blue–Gray Field when minor league baseball games were played there. Located in Bluefield, West Virginia, the team played at the park through the beginning of the 1939 season.

The Bluefield Blue–Grays ended their first season in 1937 with a regular season fourth place finish. Bluefield had a final regular season record of 49–46, while playing the season under manager Ernie Powell. In the final Mountain State regular season standings, the Blue–Grays finished 14½ games behind the first place Beckley Bengals. During the season the Huntington Boosters had folded on August 1, 1937, and five teams completed the regular season. Bluefield qualified for the unique five-team round robin playoffs, with Beckley receiving a bye. The Blue–Grays lost in the round 2 games to 0 to the second place Welch Miners. Beckley eventually defeated Williamson in the finals 2 games to 0 to win the first Mountain States League championship.

Bluefield shortstop Carlos Ratliff batted .340 with 3 home runs and 30 doubles in 89 games. It was his first professional season at age 26. Following the conclusion of his playing career, Ratliff served as a collegiate coach and Athletic Director at his alma mater, Glenville State College from 1945 until his death in 1961.

A native of Canton, Ohio, Lefty Garner was a left-handed pitcher in his first professional season at age 21. He had an 11–2 record with a 2.94 ERA pitching in 14 games for the Blue–Grays. He also played 22 games in the outfield and batted .427 with 3 home runs, 10 doubles and 7 triples in 109 at bats for Bluefield.

=== 1938 to 1941: Mountain State League ===
Bluefield continued Mountain State League play in 1938 and former major league player "Sheriff" Earl Smith became the manager of the Blue–Grays at age 47. An outfielder as a player, Earl Smith had played in the major leagues with the Chicago Cubs (1916), St. Louis Browns (1917–1921) and Washington Senators (1921–1922), batting .272 with 9 career home runs and 186 RBIs in 495 career games. He was an umpire in the Middle Atlantic League in 1937.

The 1938 Mountain State League continued league play as a six-team, Class D level league and the Huntington Bees franchise rejoined the league after not completing the prior season. Bluefield finished the regular season with a losing record, as the team compiled a 55–64 record under manager Earl Smith. The Blue–Grays ended the regular season in fifth place. 17½ games behind the first place Logan Indians. With their fifth-place finish, Bluefield did not qualify for the four-team post season playoffs. The Beckley Bengals defeated the Logan Indians in the finals to win their second consecutive league title. The 1938 season was the only season as a manager for Earl Smith and marked the end of his career in the dugout.

In 1939, Bluefield outfielder Lewis D'Antoni batted .369 with 11 home runs and 65 RBIs, adding a .469 OBP and 1,062 OPS in 102 games for the Blue–Grays. Left-handed hitting second baseman Gar Ganoe had 13 triples to lead the Mountain State League. Overall, Ganoe batted .326 with 30 doubles, 9 home runs, 26 stolen bases and 107 RBIs in 120 games.

At age 17, future legendary Baseball Hall of Fame member Stan Musial played against Bluefield in the Mountain State League with the third place Williamson Colts in 1938. A pitcher in his first season, Musial compiled a 6-6 record in 20 games as a pitcher while batting .258 with 1 home run.

Veteran hurler Vic Sorrell pitched for Bluefield in 1938 at age 37 and had an impressive season with the Blue–Grays, one season removed from pitching in the major leagues with the Detroit Tigers, his final season in a 10-year major league career. Sorrell pitched in 13 games for Bluefield, with 11 complete games, garnering a 9–3 record with a 1.38 ERA in 98 innings. Sorrell joined Bluefield during the 1938 season, which he spent pitching in the minor leagues with 3 games for the Class AA level Toledo Mud Hens of the American Association and the Baltimore Orioles of the International League prior to joining Bluefield. Sorrell's 1.38 ERA led the Mountain State League.

==== 1939: League title ====
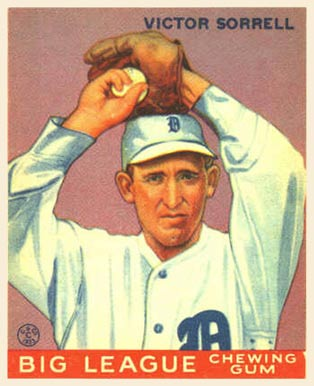
(1933) Vic Sorrell, Detroit Tigers, baseball card. Sorrell was the player/manager for Bluefield in 1939 and 1940. He led the 1939 Blue-Grays to the league title, defeating Williamson and Stan Musial in the finals.

Replacing Earl Smith, the Bluefield player-manager in 1939 was Vic Sorrell, who remained with the Blue–Grays following his successful pitching stint with the team the season prior. Sorrell was a long-time major league pitcher with the Detroit Tigers (1928–1937), compiling a 92–101 record with a 4.43 career ERA and 11 saves in 280 career games, all with Detroit.

Playing under Vic Sorrell, the 1939 Bluefield Blue–Grays became the Mountain State League champions. Despite their consecutive championships, the Beckley Bengals team folded and the Ashland Colonels replaced the Beckley, West Virginia based team in the six-team, 1939 Mountain State League.

Early in the 1939 season, the Bluefield Blue–Grays began play at the newly built Bowen Field in Bluefield, West Virginia, hosting their first home game at the new ballpark on May 11, 1939. Bluefield finished the regular season with a fourth-place finish, ending the season 12.0 games behind the first place Williamson Red Birds (a St. Louis Cardinals affiliate) in the final Mountain State League regular season standings. The Blue–Grays had 65–64 record under manager Vic Sorrell and qualified for the four-team playoffs. In the playoffs, Bluefield first defeated the Welch Miners 2 games to 0 in the first round to advance. The Blue–Grays became Mountain State League champions for the first time in defeating Williamson 3 games to 1 in the finals.

At age 18, Stan Musial returned to the league with Williamson in 1939 and became a primary outfielder after his pitching continued to pale in comparison to his hitting. Musial batted .352 and had a 9-2 record with a 4.30 ERA as a pitcher as his Williamson team made the finals against Bluefield. Following his two seasons in the league with Williamson, Musial continued to advance and made his major league debut with the St. Louis Cardinals in 1941, embarking on his Hall of Fame career.

Pitching on his 1939 championship team, player/manager Vic Sorrell had a 12-6 record with a 3.43 ERA while pitching in 21 games in his dual role.

As defending league champions, the Bluefield Blue–Grays ended the 1940 season in the Mountain State League playoffs and Vic Sorrell returned as the Bluefield player/manager. The unaffiliated Blue–Grays had a regular season record of 65–51, finishing in third place under Sorrell. In the six-team Class D level, league, Bluefield finished 8½ games behind the first place Williamson Red Birds. Bluefield lost in first round of the playoffs 3 games to 0 to the Williamson Red Birds. Williamson then advanced and defeated the Logan Indians 3 games to 1 in the finals to win the league title.

Vic Sorrell announced his retirement as a player following the 1940 season.In his final season in professional baseball at age 40, Sorrell had a 5–1 record with a 1.98 ERA pitching in 6 games for his own Blue–Grays team. Following his tenure with Bluefield, Sorrell was an independent scout for a few years. Sorrell then became a long-time collegiate coach, serving as the head baseball coach of the NC State Wolfpack baseball team. He coached the Wolfpack baseball teams for 21 seasons from 1946 to 1966, compiling a 223–195 overall record.

For the 1941 season, Bill Averette replaced Vic Sorrell as the Blue–Grays manager, coming to Bluefield after managing the Kinston Eagles of the Class D level Coastal Plain League in 1940. The Bluefield Blue–Grays ended the 1941 season in third place in the six-team, Class D level league and again qualified for the post season playoffs. Bluefield ended the Mountain State regular season with a record of 64–61 under manager Bill Averette. The Blue–Grays ended the season 14½ games behind the first place Logan Indians. In the playoffs, Bluefield lost in first round to Logan 2 games to 1. Logan advanced and defeated the Welch Miners in the finals. Bill Averette pitched in 16 games for Bluefield at age 33 in his player/manager role. Had a 5–7 record with a 4.26 ERA on the season.

=== 1942: Final Mountain State League season ===
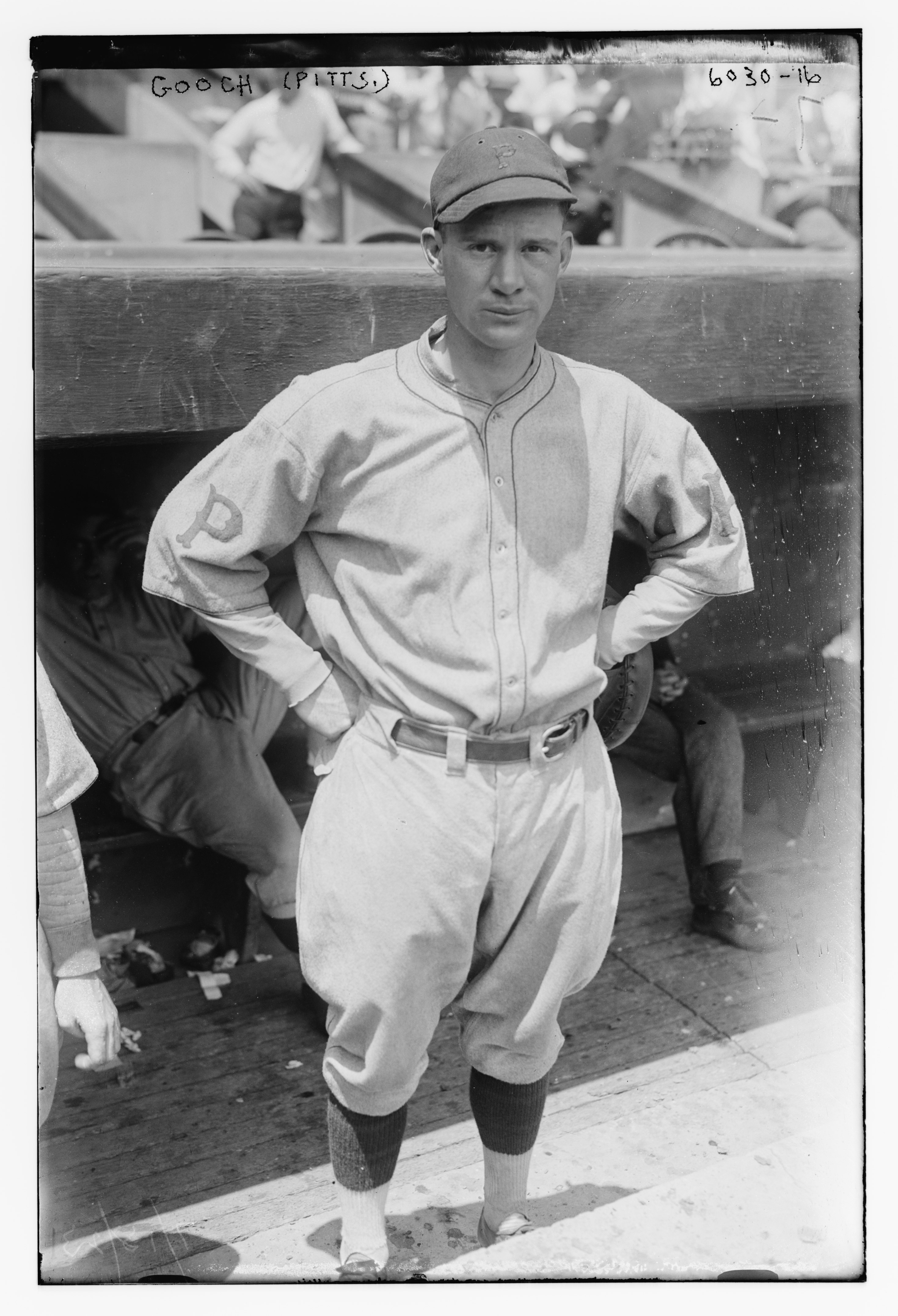
(1925) Johnny Gooch, Pittsburgh Pirates. Gooch was the player/manager for Bluefield in 1942.

Johnny Gooch became the Bluefield player/manager in 1942. Joining the club at age 44, Gooch had managed the Hutchinson Pirates of the Western Association in 1941. A catcher, Gooch played 11 seasons in the major leagues with the Pittsburgh Pirates (1921–1928), Brooklyn Robins (1928–1929), Cincinnati Reds (1929–1930) and Boston Red Sox (1933). He played on the 1925 World Series champion Pittsburgh Pirates.

The Bluefield Blue–Grays did not qualify for the Mountain State League post season playoffs in 1942. The Blue–Grays finished with a losing record, compiling a 55–69 regular season record and finishing in fifth place playing the season under manager Johnny Gooch. Bluefield was 27.0 games behind first place Huntington Jewels in the fina; regular season standings. Their fifth-place finish left them out of the four-team playoffs. In the playoffs, the Ashland Colonels defeated Hutington in the final.

In 1942, Blue–Grays outfielder Harry Hughes batted .366 with 13 home runs on the season. At age 18, Bluefield pitcher Dale Blevins issued 151 walks on the season en route to a 5–13 record. At age 44, player/manager Johnny Gooch played in 14 games as a catcher and batted .270 in his limited playing time. Following his season with Bluefield, Gooch moved to Nashville, Tennessee in 1943 and founded a bat manufacturing company, Gooch Manufacturing. He later founded the Gooch Lamp Company in Nashville.

The Mountain State League permanently folded following the 1942 season. In the 1943 baseball season, with the United States engaged in World War II, only 11 total minor leagues were organized to play a 1943 schedule, a reduction of 19 from 30 leagues that played the 1942 season. The Appalachian League and the Pennsylvania–Ontario–New York League (PONY League) were the only Class D level minor leagues that played a 1943 season.

The Mountain State League never reformed. In its final season, the Mountain State League consisted of the Ashland Colonels, Bluefield Blue-Grays, Huntington Jewels, Logan Indians, Welch Miners and Williamson Red Birds teams. Six seasons later, a separate Mountain States League (plural) was formed in the region for the 1948 with teams based in Kentucky, Tennessee and Virginia. None of the former Mountain State League teams were league members of the similarly named league.

=== 1946: Post World War II / Bluefield joins Appalachian League ===
With World War II completed, the Class D level Appalachian League continued play and expanded to an eight-team league for the 1946 season. The Appalachian League had continued play during the World War as a four-team Class D level league. The Bluefield Blue–Grays were reformed in 1946 and joined as a new team with membership the expanded league.

The Bluefield Blue–Grays became a minor league affiliate for the first time in 1946, reaching a partnership with the Boston Braves of the National League. Bluefield would play six consecutive seasons as a Boston Braves affiliate.

The Bluefield Blue-Grays were joined by the New River Rebels (Chicago White Sox affiliate), Pulaski Counts and Welch Miners as the four new franchises that joined the Appalachian League, as the league remained classified as a Class D level league despite the expansion. Bluefield and Welch had previously been rivals as when both teams played as members of the defunct Mountain State League. The Appalachian League was one of the few minor leagues that had continued play during the entirety of World War II, with the Bristol Twins (New York Giants), Elizabethton Betsy Cubs (Chicago Cubs), Johnson City Cardinals (St. Louis Cardinals) and Kingsport Cherokees (Washington Senators) teams continuing with their membership in the league.

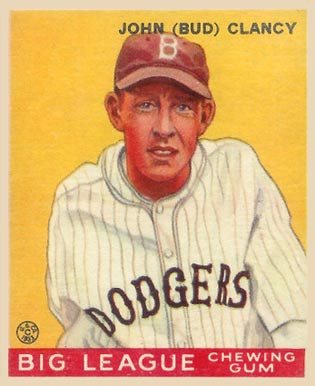
(1933) Bud Clancy, Brooklyn Dodgers, baseball card. Clancy managed Bluefield in their first Appalachian League season in 1946.

Bud Clancy was hired by the Boston Braves to manage their newly formed affiliate team in Bluefield. Clancy was a former major league player with the Chicago White Sox (1924–1930), Brooklyn Dodgers (1932) and Philadelphia Phillies (1934). Joining Bluefield at age 45, Clancy had last managed the Santa Barbara Saints of the California League for two seasons before World War II caused the team to fold.

During the season, Bud Clancy served under Bluefield team president Clyde Elliott and team business manager Ed Smith, Jr. A local newspaper reporter Stubby Currence, covered the team for the local Bluefield Daily Telegraph. On June 17, 1946, Clancy was fired by Ed Smith, with Smith stating he wanted a player-manager in the role, as Clancy did not play any longer. "Clancy has not been treated right," Clyde Elliott said. "We had an agreement with Clancy for the entire season." The Braves responded to the controversy by purchasing the all of Ed Smith’s stock shares in the team and one share from Elliott, giving the organization the controlling interest of the Bluefield franchise. The Boston Braves employed Clancy as a minor league scout for the remainder of the 1946 season.

A current player for the Blue–Grays, Walter DeFreitas, replaced Bud Clancy as the Bluefield manager. As the Appalachian League expanded, the Bluefield Blue–Grays ended the 1946 season with a 52–72 record. This earned Bluefield a seventh place finish, playing the full season under managers Bud Clancy and his replacement, DeFreitas.The Bluefield Blue–Grays finished 31½ games behind the first place New River Rebels in the final regular season standings. The Bluefield Blue–Grays finished ahead of only the Welch Miners, who finished 47 games behind New River. With their seventh-place finish, the Blue–Grays did not qualify for the four-team playoffs won by the New River Rebels.

Bluefield first baseman Thomas Zinkmund had a league leading 16 triples on the season. Overall, Zinkmund batted .380 for Bluefield with 3 home runs, 80 RBIs and 17 stolen bases on the season, playing at age 21.

=== 1947 to 1950: Appalachian League ===
The Bluefield Blue–Grays continued play in the Appalachian State League as a Boston Braves affiliate in 1947. Bluefield ended the 1947 Appalachian League regular season with a record of 69–57, playing the season under new player/manager George Lacy. Their record earned Bluefield a third-place finish in the eight-team league. With their third place finish in the regular season, the Bluefield Blue–Grays qualified for the four-team playoffs. The Bluefield Blue–Grays finished 12.0 games behind the first place Pulaski Counts in the final regular season standings. In their first round playoff series, the New River Rebels defeated the Blue–Grays 3 games to 1 and advanced. New River won the Appalachian League championship, defeating the Pulaski Counts in the finals.

Playing 45 games at catcher and 18 at first base at age 34, player/manager George Lacy batted .312 on the season, hitting 8 home runs with 60 RBIs in 77 total games for Bluefield. Lacy was a graduate of the University of Richmond. Playing his first professional season with the Blue–Grays at age 24, outfielder Art Moore batted .362 with 31 home runs and 117 RBIs. His OPS was 1.146 in 103 games.

Continuing as a Boston Braves affiliate in 1948, the Bluefield Blue–Grays advanced to the Appalachian League playoff final. The Blue–Grays ended the regular season with a third-place regular season finish under their returning manager George Lacy. The Bluefield compiled a record of 68–52 in the final regular standings of the eight team Class D level league . Bluefield Blue–Grays ended the season 14½ games behind the first place Pulaski Counts.

Bluefield swept the Welch Miners (Philadelphia Athletics affiliate) 3 games to 0 in the first round to advance to the final. Pulaski then defeated the Bluefield Blue-Grays in the finals 4 games to 1 to win the Appalachian League title. Bluefield had some strong offensive seasons from its lineup in 1948. Player/manager George Lacy batted .309 on the season, hitting 2 home runs with 48 RBIs, appearing in 67 games at catcher. At age 19, Left-handed hitting first baseman Larry Pennell batted .338 with 16 home runs and 137 RBIs with 17 stolen bases. Splitting time at catcher and playing in the outfield, 20 year old Robert Pottenger batted .361 with 7 home runs and 102 RBIs. Following his two seasons with Bluefield, George Lacy became the player manager of the Franklin Kildees of the Class D level Virginia League in 1949.

==== 1949: Appalachian League champions ====
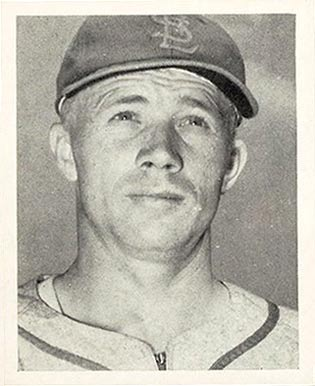
(1941) Ernie White, St. Louis Cardinals, baseball card. White managed Bluefield to the 1949 Appalachian League championship.

Former major league pitcher Ernie White replaced George Lacy as the Bluefield manager in 1949 and led the Blue–Grays to a highly successful season. A lefty, White had just pitched his last major league season in 1948 and remained with the Boston Braves organization, being hired manage Bluefield in the Braves' minor league system at age 32. White had pitched in the major leagues for the St. Louis Cardinals (1940–1943) and Boston Braves (1946–1948), compiling a career 30–21 record with 6 saves and a 2.78 ERA in 108 career appearances. He was a member of the 1942 World Series champion St. Louis Cardinals. With his career interrupted by military service in the U.S. Army during World War II, White wasn't as effective on the mound following his military service. White's career was also affected by a broken bone in his shoulder suffered during a game in May 1943.

Basketball star Ralph Beard played with Bluefield in his first professional baseball season in 1949. Beard had played basketball and baseball at the University of Kentucky, where his #12 is retired by the basketball team. The summer prior to joining Bluefield, he played basketball and won a gold medal in the 1948 Summer Olympics with Team USA.

With Ernie White as manager, the Bluefield Blue–Grays won the Appalachian League championship in 1949, remaining as a Boston Braves minor league affiliate. Bluefield first won the regular season pennant with a record of 88–34, finishing in first place in the final regular season standings of the eight-team Class D level league. The Blue–Grays finished 6.0 games ahead of the second-place Pulaski Counts. Winning the pennant, Bluefield qualified for the four-team Appalachian League playoffs and advanced to the finals for the second consecutive season. In their first-round playoff series, Bluefield defeated the Johnson City Cardinals (St. Louis Cardinals affiliate) 2 games to 0 advance. In the final, Bluefield defeated the Bristol Twins (New York Giants), sweeping the Twins 3 games to 0 to win their first Appalachian League championship.

Robert Pottenger returned to Bluefield in 1949 and batted .385 with 10 home runs and 57 RBIs in 52 games before being promoted by the Boston Braves to the Eau Claire Bears of the Class C level Northern League.

First baseman Ed Heap batted .367 with 9 home runs and 123 RBIs and 37 stolen bases in 122 games. Outfielder John Karpinski batted .340 with 20 home runs and 137 RBIs while scoring 117 runs in 120 games. Ernie White pitched in 5 games for Bluefield and had a 3–0 record with 2 complete games and 1 shutout. It was his final season as a player at age 32.

West Virginia native Bob Bowman returned to pitch for the 1949 Bluefield championship team at age 38. He had been a member of the 1937 Blue–Grays in their first season. Bowman had purchased a 45-acre farm near McComas, West Virginia and playing in Bluefield allowed him to be near his farm. Pitching for the 1949 championship team, Bowman had a 14–3 record for Bluefield with a 3.72 ERA pitching in 23 games with 13 complete games. Bowman had pitched in the major leagues with the St. Louis Cardinals (1939–1940), New York Giants (1941) and Chicago Cubs (1942) before his return to Bluefield. He had a 26–17 record with 9 saves and a 3.82 ERA in 209 career major league games. He had a strong rookie season for St. Louis in 1939, compiling a 13–5 record and a 2.60 ERA record with 8 saves for the Cardinals. Bowman died in Bluefield, West Virginia in 1972 at age 61.

Playing 20 games at second base with Bluefield, Ralph Beard batted .323 with a .393 OBP and 1 home run, 7 doubles and 3 triples. That summer Beard was drafted with the 12th pick by the Chicago Stags in the 1949 BAA draft to play professional basketball. In 1951, Beard was involved in the 1951 college basketball point-shaving scandal and became permanently banned from playing both professional basketball and professional baseball.

Following his championship season with Bluefield, Ernie White was promoted by the Boston Braves organization to manage the Evansville Braves of the Class B level Three-I League for the 1950 season. Ralph Beard played 93 games with Evansville in 1950, following White to Evansville, his final season before being banned.

As Bluefield defended their Appalachian League championship in 1950, player/manager Bill Adair was hired to replace Ernie White as manager of the Blue–Grays. The season prior to joining the Blue–Grays, Adair had served in the Braves organization as the player/manager of the Owensboro Oilers in the Kitty League in 1949, leading the Oilers to the league regular season pennant.

With Adair at the helm and continuing their tenure in the league as a Boston Braves minor league affiliate, the Bluefield Blue–Grays won the 1950 regular season Appalachian League pennant, their second consecutive pennant. In the eight-team league, the Blue–Grays ended the regular season with a record of 80–40, finishing in first place. Bluefield finished 3½ games ahead of the second-place Bristol Twins in the class D level league's overall standings. The Appalachian League adopted a split season schedule for the 1950 season, with Bluefield winning both of the half-season pennants during the season. Rather than not hold a playoff, Bluefield was matched against overall second place Bristol in a final playoff. In the playoff final, Bristol defeated Bluefield in the final 3 games to 0.

An infielder, Blue–Grays player-manager Bill Adair batted .342 in 45 games, hitting 6 home runs in his dual role for the Bluefield. Blue–Grays pitcher Dick Kelly finished with a record of 21–7 for Bluefield with a 2.79 ERA in 38 games covering 215 innings. Pitching at age 39, Bob Bowman remained with Bluefield and had a 8-1 record with a 2.78 ERA in 15 games for the Blue–Grays. It was his final professional season as a player.

Bluefield shortstop Billy Queen led the Appalachian league with 159 total hits in 1950. Playing for the Blue–Grays at age 21, Queen batted .356 with 21 home runs and 39 doubles for Bluefield. Queen played briefly in the major leagues, appearing in 3 games with the 1954 Milwaukee Braves.

=== 1951 to 1953: Appalachian League ===
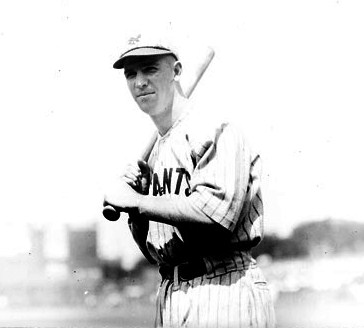
(1923) Travis Jackson, New York Giants. A member of the Baseball Hall of Fame, Jackson managed Bluefield in 1951.

After playing as an eight-team league for several seasons prior, the Class D level Appalachian League reduced to a six-team league for its 1951 minor league season. The New River Rebels and Pulaski Counts teams did not return to the league and were folded. The Bluefield Blue–Grays continued league play and remained as a Boston Braves affiliate. Bluefield joined with the Bristol Twins ( New York Giants), Elizabethton Phils (Philadelphia Phillies), Johnson City Cardinals (St. Louis Cardinals), Kingsport Cherokees and Welch Miners (Cincinnati Reds) teams in continuing as league members. Opening day games in the Appalachian League were held on April 29, 1951.

Baseball Hall of Fame member Travis Jackson was hired as the Bluefield manager to begin the 1951 season. A former player, Jackson was the shortstop for the New York Giants from 1922 to 1936 and a member of the 1933 World Series champion Giants team. Jackson was inducted into the Baseball Hall of Fame in 1982. Jackson joined the Blue–Grays having managed the Boston Braves' affiliate Owensboro Oilers in the Class D level Kitty League in 1950 at age 46.

During the season on June 24, 1951, Travis Jackson was promoted by the Boston Braves from Class D Bluefield to the Hartford Chiefs of the Class A level Eastern League. Jackson's move to manage Hartford occurred when the Hartford Chief's manager Tommy Holmes was named as the Boston Braves' manager on that date. Jackson's replacement at the Bluefield manager was pitcher Xavier Rescigno. Rescigno had pitched in the major leagues for the Pittsburgh Pirates from 1943 to 1945, winning 19 career games with 16 saves and a 4.13 ERA in 129 career games. Rescigno had begun the season as a player with the Albany Senators of the Class A level Eastern League, pitching in 10 games at age 38. He did not pitch after joining Bluefield as its manager.

The Blue–Grays ended the 1951 Appalachian League regular season with 69–59 record and advanced to the playoff final. Bluefield finished in second place, playing under managers Travis Jackson and his replacement Xavier Rescigno. In the final regular season Appalachian League standings, the Bluefield Blue–Grays ended the schedule 15½ games behind the first place Kingsport Cherokees in the six-team Class D level league. In the four team playoffs, the Bluefield Blue-Grays defeated the Johnson City Cardinals in the first round of the playoffs, 2 games to 1. Bluefield advanced to the finals where they lost to Kingsport 3 games to 2.

Playing third base at age 17, Johnny Goryl played his first professional season for Bluefield in 1951. He batted .314 with 1 .423 OBP with 2 home runs in 20 games. As a player, Goryl advanced to the major leagues, batting .225 in his career with the Chicago Cubs (1957–1959) and Minnesota Twins (1962–1964). Goryl served as the manager of the Minnesota Twins in 1980 and 1981. Serving as a coach and scout for the Cleveland Indians for many years beginning in 1982, Goryl was inducted into the Cleveland Guardians Distinguished Hall of Fame in 2024.

After leading the team to the playoff final, the 1951 season was the final season of professional baseball for Bluefield manager Xavier Rescigno.

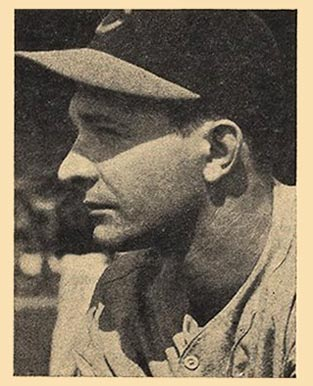
(1940) Joe "Fireman" Beggs, Cincinnati Reds. Beggs managed Bluefield in 1952, a season in which the team did not have a major league affiliate.

Former major league pitcher, Joe Beggs became the Bluefield manager for the 1952 season, replacing Xavier Rescigno. Beggs came to Bluefield after two seasons of managing the Cincinnati Reds affiliate Charleston Senators of the Class A level Central League. Beggs was an avid reader who spoke several languages. In his major league career, Beggs pitched for the New York Yankees (1938), Cincinnati Reds (1940–1944, 1946–1947) and New York Giants (1947–1948). In 1940, Beggs compiled a 12–3 record with a 2.00 ERA pitching in 37 games for the 1940 World Series champion Cincinnati Reds. Beggs had a career ERA of 2.96 and a 48–35 record with 29 saves in 238 career major league games. His playing career was interrupted by military service in the U.S. Navy during World War II, where he served as a gunnery officer and reached the rank of Lieutenant Senior. His pitching wasn't as effective after his return from the military and he suffered a pitching injury that effectively ended his career.

Bluefield did not remain an affiliate of the Braves in 1952, ending a six-season association and the Boston Braves moved to become the Milwaukee Braves following the 1952 season.

During the 1952 season, 18-year-old Bristol Twins pitcher Bill Bell threw two consecutive no-hitters in May, the second known occurrence of the event in professional baseball history. Later in the 1952 season, on August 24, 1952, Bell threw his third no-hitter of the season in a 20-strikeout performance against the Bluefield Blue–Grays at Bristol, winning the game 4–0. Bell was promoted to the Pittsburgh Pirates near the end the 1951 season.

The Bluefield Blue–Grays were unaffiliated with a major league team for the 1952 Appalachian League season, while the rest of the league continued their affiliations. Bluefield ended the season tied for fifth place, essentially a last place tie as the Johnson City Cardinals won the 1952 Appalachian League pennant by a wide margin. Bluefield Blue–Grays ended the regular season with a final record of 52–64 playing the season under player/manager Joe Beggs. The Kingsport Cherokees had the exact record as Bluefield in the final standings, leaving the teams in a fifth place tie. The Bluefield Blue–Grays and Kingsport both finished 17.0 games behind the first place Johnson City team in the six-team Class D level league. The Blue–Grays did not qualify for the four-team playoffs as the Welch Miners defeated Pulaski in the playoff final to claim the Appalachian League championship.

Catcher Rufus Hatten played for Bluefield in 1952, batting .206 in 10 games at age 31 in his last professional season. A Former Negro leagues player prior to joining Bluefield, Hatten played in short stints with the Memphis Red Sox (1942), Chicago American Giants (1944) and Baltimore Elite Giants (1946).

Following his season with Bluefield, manager Joe Beggs left professional baseball. He became a high school history teacher in the Cincinnati, Ohio area.

The 1953 Bluefield Blue–Grays continued play in the six-team Appalachian League, becoming a Washington Senators affiliate for the 1953 season. Playing the season under player/manager Ivan Kuester, Bluefield ended the Appalachian League regular season in last place. Kuester had managed the Washington affiliate Charlotte Hornets of the Tri-State League in 1952. The Blue–Grays had a record of 43–82 and finished 40.0 games behind the pennant winning Johnson City Cardinals in the final standings. The 1953 Appalachian League played only a final series where the second-place Welch Miners won 3 games to 0 over Johnson City. In his dual role, manager Ivan Kuester appeared in just 6 games as a player at age 33. He left professional baseball following the 1953 season.

Outfielder Orlando Leroux led Bluefield in hitting in 1953, batting .332 with a .431 OBP. He had 33 doubles, 16 home runs and 102 RBIs at age 24. Leroux played in the minor leagues through 1955. From 1956 to 1961 he played in the with four different teams in the Mexican Baseball League.

=== 1954 Appalachian League: Last place to first place ===
The 1954 Bluefield Blue–Grays went from last to first in the Appalachian League. Bluefield became a minor league affiliate of the Boston Red Sox and won both the Appalachian League pennant and championship in the Class D level league.

Catcher Len Okrie became the Bluefield player/manager for the 1954 season. It was his first managerial role following his major league playin career. A catcher, Okrie had played briefly in the major leagues with the Washington Senators (1948, 1950–1951) and Boston Red Sox (1952), batting .218 in 42 career games with 0 home runs and 3 RBIs. His father, Frank, was a left-handed pitcher who played in the major leagues with the 1920 Detroit Tigers. His two Frank Jr. and Robert both played minor league baseball. After playing with Boston in 1952, Len Okrie spent the 1953 season in the minor leagues as a player for the Class A level Albany Senators of the Appalachian League, a Boston Red Sox affiliate.

The Bluefield Blue–Grays finished the regular season with a record of 70–43, ending the season in first place in the six-team league under manager Len Okrie. Bluefield ended the regular season 3.0 games ahead of the second-place Pulaski Phillies in the final regular season standings of the Class D level league. After their pennant winning regular season, Bluefield did not lose a game in the playoffs. In the first round of the four-team playoffs, Bluefield defeated the Welch Miners 2 games to 0. Advancing to the finals, the Blue–Grays won the league title, sweeping the Pulaski Phillies in 3 games in the final.

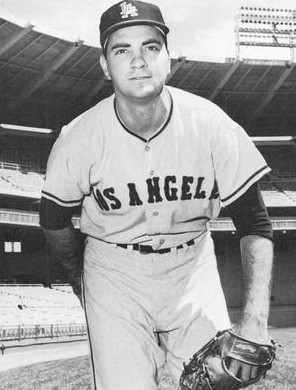
(1964) Ken McBride, Los Angeles Angels. McBride pitched for Bluefield in 1954 at age 18, winning 18 games and helping the Blue-Grays to the league championship.

In their championship season, Bluefield was led on the mound by 18-year-old Ken McBride in 1954. McBride had an 18–4 record and 2.53 ERA in 27 games. He has 20 complete games and threw 210 innings for the Blue–Grays. McBride advanced after his season with Bluefield and he pitched in the major leagues for the Chicago White Sox (1959–1960) and Los Angeles Angels (1961–1965). He was a three-time major league All-star and ended his career with a 40–50 record and a 3.79 ERA in 151 career games. McBride was the starting pitcher for the American League in the 1963 Major League Baseball All-Star Game. McBride was signed out of West High School in Cleveland, Ohio by Boston Red Sox scout, Denny Galehouse, receiving a reported signing bonus of $500. After McBride graduated from high school, he pitched in 1953 for a semipro team sponsored by Mike’s Diner before joining Bluefield in 1954. An arm injury suffered early in the 1964 season shortened McBride's career. McBride heard a "pop" in his arm and had great pain that never subsided. From that point he lost 10 consecutive games. He was out of the major leagues early in the 1965 season.

After joining the team as a pitcher, Jim Mahoney was switched to shortstop with Bluefield. Mahoney had a strong season for Bluefield in 1954 and led the league in runs scored. Mahoney batted .315 with 23 home runs, 78 RBIs, 101 runs scored and 21 stolen bases in 113 games for the Blue–Grays. After losing the entire 1957 and 1958 seasons to military service in the U.S. Army, Mahoney played in the major leagues playing parts of seasons with the Boston Red Sox (1959), Washington Senators (1961), Cleveland Indians (1962) and Houston Astros (1965), batting .229 in 120 career games After his playing career, Mahoney served as a coach with the Chicago White Sox (1972–76) and Seattle Mariners between 1972 and 1986.

Jack Stallings played second base for Bluefield in 1954. He batted .295 with 5 home runs and 19 stolen bases in 72 games. In 1955 he began a long career as a collegiate coach and International coach, becoming the assistant baseball coach at Wake Forest Demon Deacons baseball.

Player/manager Len Okrie played his final games as a player in 1954, appearing in 22 games at catcher, batting .319, with 1 home run and 9 RBIs for his championship Bluefield team at age 30.

=== 1955: Final Blue–Grays Appalachian League season ===
The 1955 season was the final one for Bluefield playing in the Appalachian League as the Blue–Grays. The 1955 Appalachian league expanded to became an eight-team Class D level league, adding the Salem Rebels and Kingsport Cherokees teams to the league. The Bluefield Blue–Grays joined with the returning league members consisting of the Bristol Twins (New York Yankees), Johnson City Cardinals (St. Louis Cardinals), Pulaski Phillies (Philadelphia Phillies), Welch Miners (Kansas City Athletics and the Wytheville Statesmen in the league membership. The eight-team Appalachian League schedule began with opening games on May 1, 1955.

The Bluefield Blue–Grays remained a Boston Red Sox affiliate for the 1955 season. Bluefield ended the 1955 schedule with a record of 55–67, which put Bluefield in sixth place, playing the season under returning player/manager Len Okrie. The Blue–Grays finished 29.0 games behind the first place Salem Rebels in the Appalachian League regular season standings. With their sixth-place finish, the Blue–Grays did not qualify for the four-team Appalachian League playoffs. In the four-team playoffs, Johnson city and Salem both won their first round series and advanced to the final. Johnson City had defeated Bristol was set to play against Salem who had defeated the Kingsport Cherokees in their first round series. However, the teams were declared co-champions when the finals series was forced to be canceled due to continued rain.

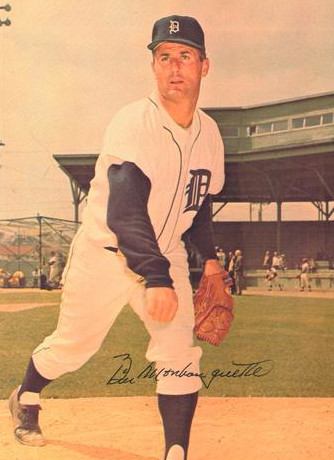
(1966) Bill Monbouquette, Detroit Tigers. A member of the Boston Red Sox Hall of Fame, Monbouquette pitched in his first professional season with Bluefield in 1955.

Playing in 75 games for Bluefield at age 17, outfielder Lou Clinton batted .361 with a .418 OBP, hitting 19 home runs with 76 RBIs. After his 75 games with Bluefield, Clinton was promoted by Boston to the Class B level Greensboro Patriots of the Carolina League, where he .303 in 18 games to end the season. Clinton played in the major leagues with the Boston Red Sox (1960–1964), California Angels (1964–1965), Kansas City Athletics (1965), Cleveland Indians (1965) and New York Yankees (1966–1967), batting .247 with 67 career home runs in 697 games. Clinton had just graduated from Ponca City High School in Ponca City, Oklahoma when he was signed by Boston Red Sox scout Denny Doyle. Boston assigned him to begin his professional career with Bluefield.

Pitcher Bill Monbouquette played for Bluefield in 1955 at age 18, compiling a 4-2 record in 10 games in his first professional season. A member of the Boston Red Sox Hall of Fame. Monbouquette became a four-time All-star who pitched in the 11 seasons in the major leagues for the Boston Red Sox (1958–1965), Detroit Tigers (1966–1967), New York Yankees (1967–1968) and San Francisco Giants (1968). Monbouquette had a career 114–112 record with a 3.68 ERA. After graduating from Medford High School in Medford, Massachusetts on June 20, 1955, Monbouquette signed with the Red Sox, a signing facilitated by scout Freddie Maguire. He was assigned to join Bluefield to begin his career. Late in his life, Monbouquette was stricken with a form of cancer. In 2010, the rock band The Remains released "Monbo Time", a song that was a tribute to Monbouquette, with 50% of revenue from the song dedicated to cancer research.

The Appalachian League folded following the conclusion of the 1955 season and the Bluefield Blue–Grays did not return to play in 1956.

With Bluefield folded in 1956, Len Okrie remained in the Boston Red Sox organization, becoming manager of the Lafayette Red Sox of the Class D level Midwest League. Okrie later became a bullpen coach in the major leagues with the Boston Red Sox (1961-1966) and Detroit Tigers (1970). He managed in the minor leagues through the 1974 season. In 1974 he became a deputy with the Cumberland County, North Carolina, Sheriff’s Department worked until his retirement. From 1993 to 2005 he worked as a greeter at the Wal-Mart in Hope Mills, North Carolina.

=== 1956: Appalachian League folds ===
In 1956, the Appalachian League did not play as the league disbanded before reorganizing after being dormant for one season. The Bluefield Blue–Grays and seven other league teams did not return to minor league play for the 1956 season.

After its one season hiatus, the Appalachian League reformed in 1957 with the Bluefield franchise rejoining the six-team league. The 1957 Bluefield Dodgers began another lengthy tenure of Appalachian League play, as the Bluefield franchise was a member the Appalachian League uninterrupted until the league's demise in 2020.

== The ballparks ==
Beginning in 1937, the Bluefield Blue–Grays teams first hosted their home minor league games at Cain Field. While the team played there, the ballpark was also nicknamed Blue–Gray Field. Located in Bluefield, West Virginia, the Blue–Grays played at the ballpark through the beginning of the 1939 season. In the era, the ballpark was located at the merger of Bluefield Avenue and Princeton Avenue, near the railroad depot.

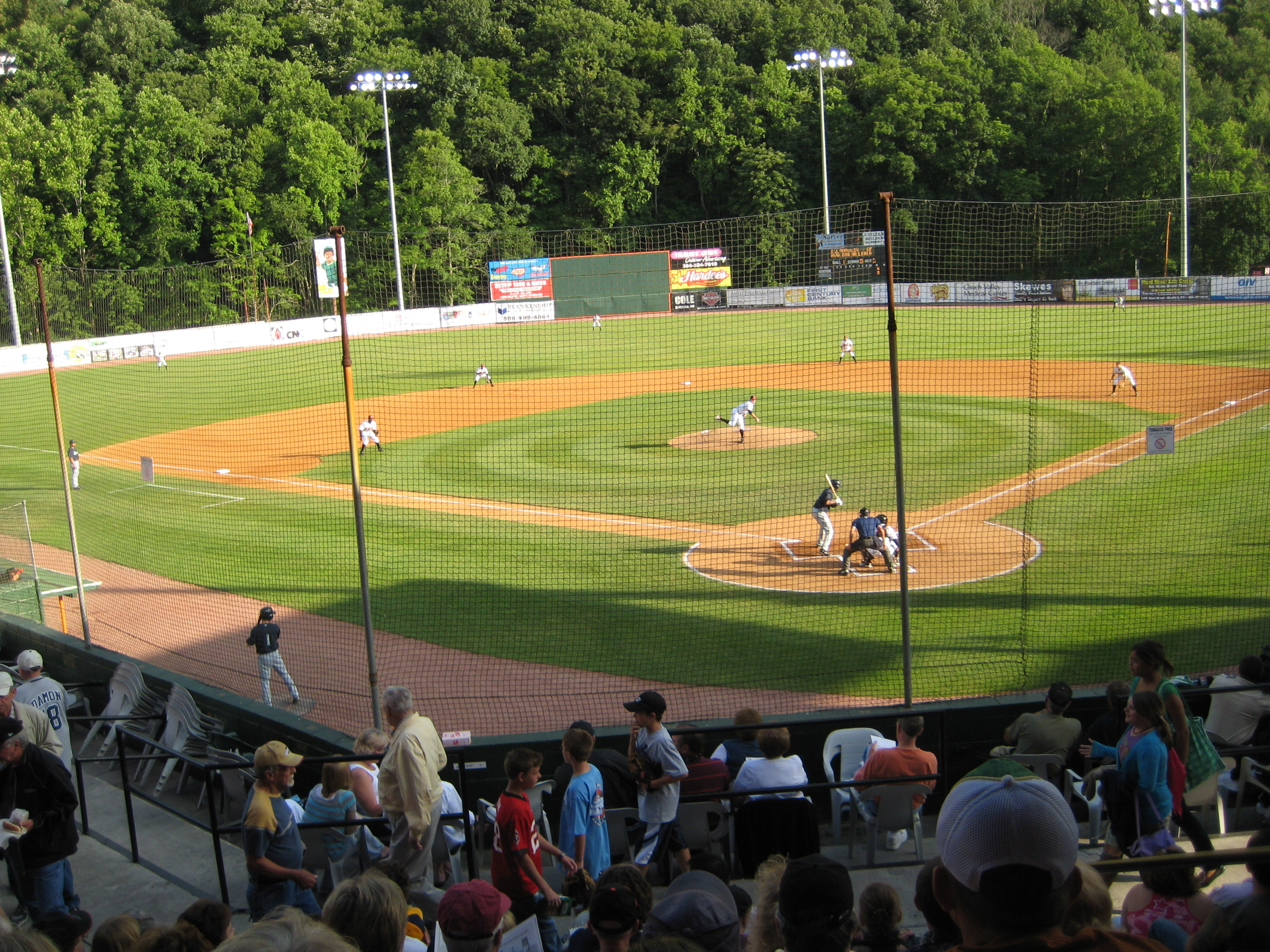
(2009) Bowen Field, Bluefield, Virginia.

A new ballpark was constructed for the 1939 season. The Blue–Grays began play at Bowen Field in Bluefield, Virginia, hosting their first home game on May 11, 1939.

The Bowen Field ballpark was built as a Works Progress Administration project. A fire in 1974 necessitated a rebuild to the ballpark grandstand. The shared city park straddles the Virginia / West Virginia state line, and the ballpark lies on the Virginia side.

The ballpark is still in use today, known as Bowen Field at Peters Park. The ballpark is within the Peters Park, which uniquely encompasses both states. Bowen Field is maintained by the city of Bluefield, West Virginia, but the ballfield physically lies in Bluefield, Virginia. The Bluefield Ridge Runners team of today's summer collegiate Appalachian League hosts games at the ballpark.The location is 2003 Stadium Drive, Bluefield, Virginia within the Tony Lotito City Park.

== Timeline ==
Year(s)	# Yrs.	Team	Level	League	Affiliate	Ballpark
1937–1938	2	Bluefield Blue–Grays	Class D	Mountain State League	None	Cain Field
1939–1942	4	Bluefield Blue–Grays	Class D	Mountain State League	None	Bowen Field
1946–1951	6	Bluefield Blue–Grays	Class D	Appalachian League	Boston Braves	Bowen Field
1952	1	Bluefield Blue–Grays	Class D	Appalachian League	None	Bowen Field
1953	1	Bluefield Blue–Grays	Class D	Appalachian League	Washington Senators	Bowen Field
1954–1955	2	Bluefield Blue–Grays	Class D	Appalachian League	Boston Red Sox	Bowen Field

== Year–by–year records ==
Year	Record	Finish	Manager	Playoffs/Notes
1937	49–46	4th	Ernie Powell	Lost in 1st round
1938	55–64	5th	Earl Smith	Did not qualify
1939	65–64	4th	Vic Sorrell	League Champions
1940	65–51	3rd	Vic Sorrell	Lost in 1st round
1941	64–61	3rd	Bill Averette	Lost in 1st round
1942	55–69	5th	Johnny Gooch	Did not qualify
1946	52–72	7th	Bud Clancy / Walter DeFreitas	Did not qualify
1947	69–57	2nd	George Lacy	Lost in 1st round
1948	68–52	3rd	George Lacy	Lost in finals
1949	88–34	1st	Ernie White	Won league pennant League Champions
1950	80–40	1st	Bill Adair	Won league pennant Lost in finals
1951	69–59	2nd	Travis Jackson / Xavier Rescigno	Lost in finals
1952	52–64	5th (t)	Joe Beggs	Did not qualify
1953	43–82	6th	Ivan Kuester	Did not qualify
1954	70–43	1st	Len Okrie	Won league pennant League Champions
1955	55–67	6th	Len Okrie	Did not qualify

== Notable alumni ==
- Travis Jackson (1951, MGR) Inducted Baseball Hall of Fame, 1982
- Bill Adair (1950, MGR)
- Frank Baldwin (1947)
- Ralph Beard (1949)
- Joe Beggs (1952, MGR)
- Bob Bowman (1937, 1949–1950)
- Charlie Bowles (1938)
- Bud Clancy (1946. MGR)
- Lou Clinton (1955)
- Johnny Gooch (1942, MGR)
- Johnny Goryl (1951) Cleveland Guardians Hall of Fame
- Rufus Hatten (1952)
- Jim Kirby (1942)
- Bill Kunkel (1955)
- Jerry Lane (1948)
- Jesse Levan (1949)
- Joe Linsalata (1940)
- Jim Mahoney (1954)
- Bobby Malkmus (1951)
- Ken McBride (1954) 3x MLB All-star
- Bill Monbouquette (1955) Boston Red Sox Hall of Fame
- Len Okrie (1954–1955, MGR)
- Harry Perkowski (1942)
- Billy Queen (1950)
- Carlos Ratliff (1937–1938)
- Xavier Rescigno (1951, MGR)
- Earl Smith (1938, MGR)
- Vic Sorrell (1938; 1939–1940, MGR)
- Jack Stallings (1954)
- Ernie White (1949, MGR)

== See also ==
- Bluefield Blue-Grays players
- List of Appalachian League champions
- List of Atlanta Braves minor league affiliates
- List of Boston Red Sox minor league affiliates
- List of Minnesota Twins minor league affiliates
