= Mountain State League =

- Classification: Class D (1937–1941); Class C (1942)
- Sport: Minor League Baseball
- First season: 1937
- Folded: 1942
- President: Ray Ryan (1937–1941); Robert T. Caldwell (1942)
- No. of teams: 7
- Country: United States of America
- Most titles: 2 Beckley Bengals (1937–1938)

The Mountain State League was a minor league baseball league that played as a six–team league from 1937 to 1942. The league franchises were based in Kentucky and West Virginia. The Mountain State League was a Class D level league from 1937 to 1941 and Class C league in 1942.

Baseball Hall of Fame member Stan Musial played in the league for two seasons, as a member of the 1938 and 1939 Williamson Colts.

== Cities represented ==
- Ashland, Kentucky: Ashland Colonels 1939–1942
- Beckley, West Virginia: Beckley Bengals 1937–1938
- Bluefield, West Virginia: Bluefield Blue–Grays 1937–1942
- Huntington, West Virginia: Huntington Boosters 1937; Huntington Bees 1938; Huntington Boosters 1939; Huntington Aces 1940–1941; Huntington Jewels 1942
- Logan, West Virginia: Logan Indians 1937–1942
- Welch, West Virginia: Welch Miners 1937–1942
- Williamson, West Virginia: Williamson Colts 1937–1938; Williamson Red Birds 1939–1942

== Standings & statistics ==
1937 Mountain State League
The Mountain State League began play in 1937 with six charter teams: the Beckley Bengals, based in Beckley, West Virginia; the Welch Miners, based in Welch, West Virginia; the Williamson Colts, based in Williamson, West Virginia; the Bluefield Blue–Grays, based in Bluefield, West Virginia; the Logan Indians based in Logan, West Virginia and the Huntington Boosters, based in Huntington, West Virginia. The Boosters withdrew from the league on August 1.

The league originally began with a split–season format, which was eventually abandoned on August 24.

The Beckley Bengals finished first in the regular season and won the league championship.

Team standings	W	L	PCT	GB	Managers
Beckley Bengals	68	36	.654	–	Eli Harris
Welch Miners	59	43	.578	8	Eddie Krajnik
Williamson Colts	54	46	.540	12	Nat Hickey
Bluefield Blue–Grays	49	46	.516	14½	Ernie Powell
Logan Indians	37	61	.378	28	Bert Grimm
Huntington Boosters	23	58	.284	NA	Joe Watson / Paul Ryan / Mike Broski / Doc Pricer

Huntington withdrew August 1; Welch withdrew September 3 during the playoff series with Williamson; Williamson withdrew September 6 during the finals.
Playoffs: Beckley, bye; Welch 2 games, Bluefield 0; Williamson 2 games, Logan 0; Williamson 1 game, Welch 0
Finals: Beckley 2 games, Williamson 0.

Player statistics
Player	Team	Stat	Tot	Player	Team	Stat	Tot
Earl Martin	Beckley	BA	.400	Charlie Bowles	Beckley	W	16
Raleigh Singleton	Beckley	Runs	113	Dixie Howell	Logan	SO	153
Stan Arnzen	Welch	Hits	150	Ed Schumacher	Beckley	ERA	2.70
Earl Martin	Beckley	RBI	96	Joseph Petrich	Welch	PCT	.731 19–7
Larry Steinbeck	Beckley	HR	20				

1938 Mountain State League
All the teams from 1937 returned to the league in 1938. Huntington became known as the Huntington Bees.

The Logan Indians finished first in the regular season. However, they lost in the league finals to the Beckley Bengals, who repeated as league champions.

Stan Musial played for the Williamson Colts in 1938.

Team standings	W	L	PCT	GB	Managers
Logan Indians	72	46	.610	–	Eddie Hock
Beckley Bengals	61	52	.540	8½	Eli Harris
Williamson Colts	58	60	.492	14	Nat Hickey
Welch Miners	56	64	.467	17	Eddie Krajnik / Charles Bowie / Carlos Ratliff
Bluefield Blue–Grays	55	64	.462	17½	Earl Smith
Huntington Bees	50	66	.431	21	Dickie Kerr

Playoffs: Logan 3 games, Williamson 2; Beckley 2 games, Welch 0.
Finals: Beckley 3 games, Logan 2.

Player statistics
Player	Team	Stat	Tot	Player	Team	Stat	Tot
Moe Franklin	Beckley	BA	.439	Earl Brinegar	Welch	W	18
Raleigh Singleton	Beckley	Runs	128	John Gorszyca	Beckley	W	18
Garfield Ganoe	Bluefield	Hits	170	Vern Kohler	Logan	SO	216
Walter Sessi	Williamson	RBI	126	Vern Kohler	Logan	ERA	2.24
Moe Franklin	Beckley	HR	26	Frank Mahon	Huntington	CG	25
				Vern Kohler	Logan	PCT	.900 18–2

1939 Mountain State League
1939 saw a few changes to the league. The Williamson Colts became the Williamson Red Birds, while the Huntington Bees became the Huntington Boosters again. The Beckley Bengals were replaced by the Ashland Colonels, based in Ashland, Kentucky.

The Williamson Red Birds finished first in the regular season. Williamson was defeated in the playoff finals by the Bluefield Blue–Grays.

Stan Musial played for the Williamson Red Birds in 1939.

Team standings	W	L	PCT	GB	Managers
Williamson Red Birds	76	51	.598	–	Harrison Wickel
Welch Miners	72	57	.558	5	Sam Gray
Huntington Boosters	66	61	.520	10	Mike Powers
Bluefield Blue–Grays	65	64	.504	12	Vic Sorrell
Logan Indians	55	75	.423	22½	Eddie Hock
Ashland Colonels	52	78	.400	25½	Harold Conn / Ray French

Playoffs: Williamson 2 games, Huntington 1; Bluefield 2 games, Welch 0.
Finals: Bluefield 3 games, Williamson 1.

Player statistics
Player	Team	Stat	Tot	Player	Team	Stat	Tot
Bill Shewey	Williamson	BA	.376	Howard Smith	Williamson	W	19
John Streza	Williamson	Runs	127	Russ Meers	Huntington	SO	297
John Streza	Williamson	Hits	185	Sam Gray	Welch	ERA	3.03
Harrison Wickel	Williamson	RBI	142	Howard Smith	Williamson	PCT	.731 19–7
Edison Guinther	Logan	HR	26				

1940 Mountain State League
For the 1940 season, the Huntington Boosters became the Huntington Aces. The Williamson Red Birds finished first in the regular season and won the league championship.

Team standings	W	L	PCT	GB	Managers
Williamson Red Birds	76	45	.628	–	Harrison Wickel
Logan Indians	75	51	.595	3½	Eddie Hock
Bluefield Blue–Grays	65	51	.560	8½	Vic Sorrell
Welch Miners	63	62	.504	15	Tex Stuart / Roy Hall
Ashland Colonels	55	71	.437	23½	Tommy Thevenow / Ray French
Huntington Aces	33	87	.275	42½	Pee Wee Wanninger / Russ Young / Ezra Midkiff

Playoffs: Logan 2 games, Welch 0; Williamson 2 games, Bluefield 0.
Finals: Williamson 3 games, Logan 1.

Player statistics
Player	Team	Stat	Tot	Player	Team	Stat	Tot
Worthington Day	Ashland	BA	.363	Harold Sharp	Williamson	W	18
Bill Shewey	Williamson	Runs	134	Joe Pennington	Logan	W	18
Worthington Day	Ashland	Hits	178	Vern Bickford	Welch	So	1.63
Tennis Mounts	Logan	Hits	178	Tom Triner	Welch	ERA	2.76
Buck Etchison	Welch	RBI	132	Ernie Peters	Williamson	PCT	.773 17–5
Stan Wentzel	Logan	HR	26				

1941 Mountain State League
The league played its final season as a Class D level league in 1941. All teams from 1940 returned. The Logan Indians finished first in the regular season and won the league championship.

Team standings	W	L	PCT	GB	Managers
Logan Indians	80	48	.625	–	Eddie Hock
Williamson Red Birds	77	50	.606	2½	Harrison Wickel
Bluefield Blue–Grays	64	61	.512	14½	Bill Averett
Welch Miners	64	62	.508	15	Fred Neisler
Ashland Colonels	53	76	.411	27½	Ray French / Charley Carman
Huntington Aces	43	84	.339	36½	Fred Blake / Robert Larsen

Playoffs: Logan 2 games, Bluefield 1; Welch 2 games, Williamson 0.
Finals: Logan 4 games, Welch 1.

Player statistics
Player	Team	Stat	Tot	Player	Team	Stat	Tot
Don Smith	Huntington	BA	.406	Joe Pennington	Logan	W	21
Ray King	Williamson	Runs	132	Joe Pennington	Logan	SO	229
Don Smith	Huntington	Hits	191	Ed Burtschy	Ashland	ERA	2.46
Harrison Wickel	Williamson	RBI	147	Joe Pennington	Logan	PCT	.778 21–6
Tennis Mounts	Logan	HR	24				

1942 Mountain State League
The league was a Class C level league in 1942. The Huntington team became the Huntington Jewels. Huntington finished first in the regular season and lost to the Ashland Colonels in the league finals.

Team standings	W	L	PCT	GB	Managers
Huntington Jewels	82	42	.661	–	Charles Lucas / Arthur Scharein
Welch Miners	67	55	.549	14	Don Manno
Williamson Red Birds	66	58	.532	16	Ollie Vanek / Jack Angle
Ashland Colonels	60	67	.472	23½	Eddie Hock
Bluefield Blue–Grays	55	69	.443	27	Johnny Gooch / Charley Carman
Logan Indians	40	79	.335	39½	Grover Hartley / Charles Hoffman / Ray Ryan

Playoffs: Ashland 2 games, Williamson 0; Huntington 2 games, Welch 1.
Finals: Ashland 4 games, Huntington 1.

Player statistics
Player	Team	Stat	Tot	Player	Team	Stat	Tot
Don Manno	Welch	BA	.381	Robert Peterson	Huntington	W	17
Don Manno	Welch	Runs	136	Ribs Raney	Huntington	W	17
Don Manno	Welch	Hits	174	Ribs Raney	Huntington	SO	146
Kenneth Wood	Huntington	RBI	126	Robert Peterson	Huntington	Pct	.810 17–4
Don Manno	Welch	HR	34				
