= List of Atlanta Braves minor league affiliates =

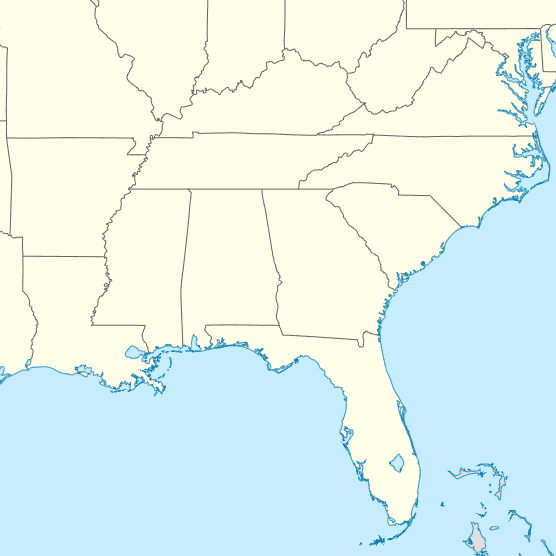
Current Atlanta Braves domestic minor league affiliate locations

The Atlanta Braves farm system consists of six Minor League Baseball affiliates across the United States and in the Dominican Republic. Four teams are independently owned, while two–the Florida Complex League Braves and Dominican Summer League Braves—are owned by the major league club.

The Braves have been affiliated with the High-A Rome Emperors of the South Atlantic League since 2003, making it the longest-running active affiliation in the organization among teams not owned by the Braves. The longest affiliation in franchise history was with the Richmond Braves, who were the team's Triple-A affiliate in the International League for 43 seasons from 1966 to 2008. Their newest affiliate is the Columbus Clingstones of the Southern League, which became the Braves' Double-A club in 2025.

Geographically, Atlanta's closest domestic affiliate is the International League's Gwinnett Stripers, which are approximately 29 miles (47 km) away. Atlanta's furthest domestic affiliate is the Rookie Florida Complex League Braves of the Florida Complex League some 491 miles (790 km) away.

== Current affiliates ==
The Atlanta Braves farm system consists of six minor league affiliates.

Class	Team	League	Location	Ballpark	Affiliated
Triple-A	Gwinnett Stripers	International League	Lawrenceville, Georgia	Coolray Field	2009
Double-A	Columbus Clingstones	Southern League	Columbus, Georgia	Synovus Park	2025
High-A	Rome Emperors	South Atlantic League	Rome, Georgia	AdventHealth Stadium	2003
Single-A	Augusta GreenJackets	Carolina League	North Augusta, South Carolina	SRP Park	2021
Rookie	FCL Braves	Florida Complex League	North Port, Florida	CoolToday Park	1976
Rookie	DSL Braves	Dominican Summer League	Boca Chica, Santo Domingo	Atlanta Braves Complex	2022

== Past affiliates ==
=== Key ===
Season	Each year is linked to an article about that particular Braves season.

=== 1932–1962 ===
Minor League Baseball operated with five classes (Double-A, Class A, Class B, Class C, and Class D) from 1932 to 1935. Class A1, between Double-A and Class A, was added in 1936. The minors continued to operate with these six levels through 1945. Triple-A was established as the highest classification in 1946, and Class A1 became Double-A, with Class A through D remaining. These six levels continued through 1962. The Pacific Coast League (PCL) was reclassified from Triple-A to Open in 1952 due to the possibility of becoming a third major league. This arrangement ended following the 1957 season when the relocation of the National League's Dodgers and Giants to the West Coast ended any chance of the PCL being promoted.

Season	Triple-A	Double-A	Class A	Class B	Class C	Class D	Ref.
1932	—	—	—	Harrisburg Senators	—	—	
1933	—	—	Harrisburg Senators	—	—	—	
1934	—	—	Harrisburg Senators	—	—	—	
1935	—	—	Harrisburg Senators	—	—	McKeesport Braves	
1936	—	St. Paul Saints	Knoxville Smokies (A1)	—	Watertown Bucks / Massena Grays	—	
1937	—	—	Scranton Miners	Columbia Senators	Ottawa Braves; Zanesville Greys	Beaver Falls Bees; Salisbury Bees	
1938	—	—	Hartford Laurels	Evansville Bees	Erie Sailors	Lexington Bees; Salisbury Bees	
1939	—	—	Hartford Bees	Evansville Bees	Allentown Dukes; Charleston Senators; Utica Braves	Bradford Bees; Owensboro Oilers	
1940	—	—	Hartford Bees	Evansville Bees; York Bees	—	Bradford Bees; Owensboro Oilers	
1941	—	—	Hartford Bees	Bridgeport Bees; Evansville Bees	—	Bradford Bees	
1942	—	—	Hartford Bees	Evansville Bees	Welch Miners	Bradford Bees; Greeneville Burley Cubs	
1943	—	—	Hartford Bees	—	—	—	
1944	—	Indianapolis Indians	Hartford Laurels	—	—	—	
1945	—	Indianapolis Indians	Hartford Bees	—	—	Mooresville Braves	
1946	Indianapolis Indians	—	Hartford Chiefs	Evansville Braves; Jackson Senators; Pawtucket Slaters; Vancouver Capilanos	Leavenworth Braves; Miami Beach Flamingos; Raleigh Capitals	Bluefield Blue-Grays; Owensboro Oilers; Richmond Roses	
1947	Milwaukee Brewers	Little Rock Travelers	Hartford Chiefs	Evansville Braves; Jackson Senators; Pawtucket Slaters	Amarillo Gold Sox; Eau Claire Bears; Fort Lauderdale Braves; Las Vegas Wranglers; Leavenworth Braves	Bloomingdale Troopers; Bluefield Blue-Grays; Owensboro Oilers; Richmond Roses	
1948	Milwaukee Brewers	—	Hartford Chiefs	Evansville Braves; Jackson Senators; Pawtucket Slaters	Eau Claire Bears; Kingston Ponies; Leavenworth Braves	Bluefield Blue-Grays; High Point-Thomasville Hi-Toms; Marysville Braves; Mount Vernon Blues; Owensboro Oilers; Richmond Roses	
1949	Milwaukee Brewers	—	Denver Bears; Hartford Chiefs	Evansville Braves; Jackson Senators; Pawtucket Slaters	Eau Claire Bears	Bluefield Blue-Grays; High Point-Thomasville Hi-Toms; Marysville Braves; Owensboro Oilers	
1950	Milwaukee Brewers	Atlanta Crackers	Denver Bears; Hartford Chiefs	Evansville Braves; Hagerstown Braves; Jackson Senators	Eau Claire Bears; Ventura Braves	Bluefield Blue-Grays; Owensboro Oilers	
1951	Milwaukee Brewers	Atlanta Crackers	Denver Bears; Hartford Chiefs	Evansville Braves; Hagerstown Braves; Wichita Falls Spudders	Eau Claire Bears; Quebec Braves; Ventura Braves	Bluefield Blue-Grays	
1952	Milwaukee Brewers	Atlanta Crackers	Hartford Chiefs	Evansville Braves; Hagerstown Braves; Wichita Falls Spudders	Eau Claire Bears; Quebec Braves; Ventura Braves	Appleton Papermakers; Danville Dans; Harlan Smokies; Welch Miners	
1953	Toledo Sox	Atlanta Crackers	Jacksonville Braves; Lincoln Chiefs	Evansville Braves; Hagerstown Braves; Wichita Falls Spudders	Eau Claire Bears; Modesto Reds; Quebec Braves	Appleton Papermakers; Sandersville Wacos; Wellsville Braves	
1954	Toledo Sox	Atlanta Crackers	Jacksonville Braves; Lincoln Chiefs	Corpus Christi Clippers; Evansville Braves	Eau Claire Braves; Quebec Braves	Lawton Braves; Wellsville Braves	
1955	Toledo Sox	Atlanta Crackers; Beaumont Exporters	Jacksonville Braves	Corpus Christi Clippers; Evansville Braves	Boise Braves; Eau Claire Braves; Quebec Braves	Lawton Braves; Wellsville Braves; West Palm Beach Indians	
1956	Wichita Braves	Atlanta Crackers; Austin Senators	Jacksonville Braves; Topeka Hawks	Corpus Christi Clippers; Evansville Braves	Boise Braves; Eau Claire Braves; Salinas Packers	Lawton Braves; Leesburg Braves; McCook Braves; Waycross Braves; Wellsville Braves	
1957	Wichita Braves	Atlanta Crackers; Austin Senators	Jacksonville Braves; Topeka Hawks	Corpus Christi Clippers; Evansville Braves	Boise Braves; Eau Claire Braves; Salinas Packers	Lawton Braves; Leesburg Braves; McCook Braves; Waycross Braves; Wellsville Braves	
1958	Wichita Braves	Atlanta Crackers; Austin Senators	Jacksonville Braves; Topeka Hawks	Cedar Rapids Braves; Yakima Braves	Boise Braves; Eau Claire Braves; Salinas Packers	McCook Braves; Midland Braves; Waycross Braves; Wellsville Braves	
1959	Louisville Colonels; Sacramento Solons	Atlanta Crackers; Austin Senators	Jacksonville Braves	Cedar Rapids Braves; Yakima Braves	Boise Braves; Eau Claire Braves	McCook Braves; Midland Braves; Wellsville Braves	
1960	Louisville Colonels; Sacramento Solons	Austin Senators	Jacksonville Braves	Cedar Rapids Braves; Yakima Braves	Boise Braves; Eau Claire Braves	Davenport Braves; Wellsville Braves	
1961	Louisville Colonels; Vancouver Mounties	Austin Senators	—	Cedar Rapids Braves; Yakima Braves	Boise Braves; Eau Claire Braves	Davenport Braves; Newton-Conover Twins; Palatka Redlegs; Wellsville Braves	
1962	Louisville Colonels; Toronto Maple Leafs	Austin Senators	—	Yakima Braves	Boise Braves; Eau Claire Braves	Cedar Rapids Braves; Dublin Braves	

=== 1963–1989 ===
Prior to the 1963 season, Major League Baseball (MLB) initiated a reorganization of Minor League Baseball that resulted in a reduction from six classes to four (Triple-A, Double-A, Class A, and Rookie) in response to the general decline of the minors throughout the 1950s and early-1960s when leagues and teams folded due to shrinking attendance caused by baseball fans' preference for staying at home to watch MLB games on television. The only change made within the next 27 years was Class A being subdivided for the first time to form Class A Short Season in 1966.

Season	Triple-A	Double-A	Class A	Class A Short Season	Rookie	Ref(s).
1963	Denver Bears; Toronto Maple Leafs	Austin Senators	Boise Braves; Greenville Braves; Waycross Braves; Yakima Braves	—	—	
1964	Denver Bears; Toronto Maple Leafs	Austin Senators	Binghamton Triplets; Yakima Braves; Greenville Braves	—	SRL Braves	
1965	Atlanta Crackers	Austin Braves	West Palm Beach Braves; Yakima Braves	—	FRL Braves	
1966	Richmond Braves	Austin Braves	Kinston Eagles; West Palm Beach Braves	Yakima Braves	GCL Braves	
1967	Richmond Braves	Austin Braves	Kinston Eagles; Lexington Braves; West Palm Beach Braves	Jamestown Braves	GCL Braves	
1968	Richmond Braves	Shreveport Braves	Greenwood Braves; West Palm Beach Braves	—	Magic Valley Cowboys	
1969	Richmond Braves	Shreveport Braves	Greenwood Braves	—	Magic Valley Cowboys	
1970	Richmond Braves	Shreveport Braves	Greenwood Braves	—	Magic Valley Cowboys	
1971	Richmond Braves	Savannah Braves	Greenwood Braves	—	Wytheville Braves	
1972	Richmond Braves	Savannah Braves	Greenwood Braves	—	Wytheville Braves	
1973	Richmond Braves	Savannah Braves	Greenwood Braves	—	Wytheville Braves	
1974	Richmond Braves	Savannah Braves	Greenwood Braves	—	Kingsport Braves	
1975	Richmond Braves	Savannah Braves	Greenwood Braves	—	Kingsport Braves	
1976	Richmond Braves	Savannah Braves	Greenwood Braves	—	Kingsport Braves; GCL Braves	
1977	Richmond Braves	Savannah Braves	Greenwood Braves	—	Kingsport Braves; GCL Braves	
1978	Richmond Braves	Savannah Braves	Greenwood Braves	—	Kingsport Braves; GCL Braves	
1979	Richmond Braves	Savannah Braves	Greenwood Braves	—	Kingsport Braves; GCL Braves	
1980	Richmond Braves	Savannah Braves	Anderson Braves; Durham Bulls	—	GCL Braves	
1981	Richmond Braves	Savannah Braves	Anderson Braves; Durham Bulls	—	GCL Braves	
1982	Richmond Braves	Savannah Braves	Anderson Braves; Durham Bulls	—	Pulaski Braves; GCL Braves	
1983	Richmond Braves	Savannah Braves	Anderson Braves; Durham Bulls	—	Pulaski Braves; GCL Braves	
1984	Richmond Braves	Greenville Braves	Anderson Braves; Durham Bulls	—	Pulaski Braves; GCL Braves	
1985	Richmond Braves	Greenville Braves	Durham Bulls; Sumter Braves	—	Pulaski Braves; GCL Braves	
1986	Richmond Braves	Greenville Braves	Durham Bull; Sumter Braves	—	Idaho Falls Braves; Pulaski Braves; GCL Braves	
1987	Richmond Braves	Greenville Braves	Durham Bulls; Sumter Braves	—	Idaho Falls Braves; Pulaski Braves; GCL Braves	
1988	Richmond Braves	Greenville Braves	Burlington Braves; Durham Bulls; Sumter Braves	—	Idaho Falls Braves; Pulaski Braves; GCL Braves	
1989	Richmond Braves	Greenville Braves	Burlington Braves; Durham Bulls; Sumter Braves	—	Idaho Falls Braves; Pulaski Braves; GCL Braves; DSL Braves	

=== 1990–2020 ===
Minor League Baseball operated with six classes from 1990 to 2020. In 1990, the Class A level was subdivided for a second time with the creation of Class A-Advanced. The Rookie level consisted of domestic and foreign circuits.

Season	Triple-A	Double-A	Class A-Advanced	Class A	Class A Short Season	Rookie	Foreign Rookie	Ref(s).
1990	Richmond Braves	Greenville Braves	Durham Bulls	Burlington Braves; Sumter Braves	—	Idaho Falls Braves; Pulaski Braves; GCL Braves	DSL Braves	
1991	Richmond Braves	Greenville Braves	Durham Bulls	Macon Braves	—	Idaho Falls Braves; Pulaski Braves; GCL Braves	DSL Braves	
1992	Richmond Braves	Greenville Braves	Durham Bulls	Macon Braves	—	Idaho Falls Gems; Pulaski Braves; GCL Braves	DSL Braves	
1993	Richmond Braves	Greenville Braves	Durham Bulls	Macon Braves	—	Danville Braves; Idaho Falls Braves; GCL Braves	DSL Braves	
1994	Richmond Braves	Greenville Braves	Durham Bulls	Macon Braves	—	Danville Braves; Idaho Falls Braves; GCL Braves	DSL Braves/Rangers	
1995	Richmond Braves	Greenville Braves	Durham Bulls	Macon Braves	Eugene Emeralds	Danville Braves; GCL Braves	DSL Braves	
1996	Richmond Braves	Greenville Braves	Durham Bulls	Macon Braves	Eugene Emeralds	Danville Braves; GCL Braves	DSL Braves	
1997	Richmond Braves	Greenville Braves	Durham Bulls	Macon Braves	Eugene Emeralds	Danville Braves; GCL Braves	DSL Braves	
1998	Richmond Braves	Greenville Braves	Danville 97s	Macon Braves	Eugene Emeralds	Danville Braves; GCL Braves	DSL Braves	
1999	Richmond Braves	Greenville Braves	Myrtle Beach Pelicans	Macon Braves	Jamestown Jammers	Danville Braves; GCL Braves	DSL Braves	
2000	Richmond Braves	Greenville Braves	Myrtle Beach Pelicans	Macon Braves	Jamestown Jammers	Danville Braves; GCL Braves	DSL Braves	
2001	Richmond Braves	Greenville Braves	Myrtle Beach Pelicans	Macon Braves	Jamestown Jammers	Danville Braves; GCL Braves	DSL Braves 1 DSL Braves 2	
2002	Richmond Braves	Greenville Braves	Myrtle Beach Pelicans	Macon Braves	—	Danville Braves; GCL Braves	DSL Braves 1 DSL Braves 2	
2003	Richmond Braves	Greenville Braves	Myrtle Beach Pelicans	Rome Braves	—	Danville Braves; GCL Braves	DSL Braves 1 DSL Braves 2	
2004	Richmond Braves	Greenville Braves	Myrtle Beach Pelicans	Rome Braves	—	Danville Braves; GCL Braves	DSL Braves 1 DSL Braves 2	
2005	Richmond Braves	Mississippi Braves	Myrtle Beach Pelicans	Rome Braves	—	Danville Braves; GCL Braves	DSL Braves 1 DSL Braves 2	
2006	Richmond Braves	Mississippi Braves	Myrtle Beach Pelicans	Rome Braves	—	Danville Braves; GCL Braves	DSL Braves	
2007	Richmond Braves	Mississippi Braves	Myrtle Beach Pelicans	Rome Braves	—	Danville Braves; GCL Braves	DSL Braves	
2008	Richmond Braves	Mississippi Braves	Myrtle Beach Pelicans	Rome Braves	—	Danville Braves; GCL Braves	DSL Braves	
2009	Gwinnett Braves	Mississippi Braves	Myrtle Beach Pelicans	Rome Braves	—	Danville Braves; GCL Braves	DSL Braves	
2010	Gwinnett Braves	Mississippi Braves	Myrtle Beach Pelicans	Rome Braves	—	Danville Braves; GCL Braves	DSL Braves	
2011	Gwinnett Braves	Mississippi Braves	Lynchburg Hillcats	Rome Braves	—	Danville Braves; GCL Braves	DSL Braves	
2012	Gwinnett Braves	Mississippi Braves	Lynchburg Hillcats	Rome Braves	—	Danville Braves; GCL Braves	DSL Braves	
2013	Gwinnett Braves	Mississippi Braves	Lynchburg Hillcats	Rome Braves	—	Danville Braves; GCL Braves	DSL Braves	
2014	Gwinnett Braves	Mississippi Braves	Lynchburg Hillcats	Rome Braves	—	Danville Braves; GCL Braves	DSL Braves	
2015	Gwinnett Braves	Mississippi Braves	Carolina Mudcats	Rome Braves	—	Danville Braves; GCL Braves	DSL Braves	
2016	Gwinnett Braves	Mississippi Braves	Carolina Mudcats	Rome Braves	—	Danville Braves; GCL Braves	DSL Braves	
2017	Gwinnett Braves	Mississippi Braves	Florida Fire Frogs	Rome Braves	—	Danville Braves; GCL Braves	DSL Braves	
2018	Gwinnett Stripers	Mississippi Braves	Florida Fire Frogs	Rome Braves	—	Danville Braves; GCL Braves	DSL Braves	
2019	Gwinnett Stripers	Mississippi Braves	Florida Fire Frogs	Rome Braves	—	Danville Braves; GCL Braves	DSL Braves	
2020 (Note: The 2020 Minor League Baseball season was cancelled due to the COVID-19 pandemic.)	Gwinnett Stripers	Mississippi Braves	Florida Fire Frogs	Rome Braves	—	Danville Braves; GCL Braves	—	

=== 2021–present ===
The current structure of Minor League Baseball is the result of an overall contraction of the system beginning with the 2021 season. Class A was reduced to two levels: High-A and Low-A. Low-A was reclassified as Single-A in 2022.

Season	Triple-A	Double-A	High-A	Single-A	Rookie	Foreign Rookie	Ref.
2021	Gwinnett Stripers	Mississippi Braves	Rome Braves	Augusta GreenJackets	FCL Braves	—	
2022	Gwinnett Stripers	Mississippi Braves	Rome Braves	Augusta GreenJackets	FCL Braves	DSL Braves	
2023	Gwinnett Stripers	Mississippi Braves	Rome Braves	Augusta GreenJackets	FCL Braves	DSL Braves	
2024	Gwinnett Stripers	Mississippi Braves	Rome Emperors	Augusta GreenJackets	FCL Braves	DSL Braves	
2025	Gwinnett Stripers	Columbus Clingstones	Rome Emperors	Augusta GreenJackets	FCL Braves	DSL Braves	
2026	Gwinnett Stripers	Columbus Clingstones	Rome Emperors	Augusta GreenJackets	FCL Braves	DSL Braves	
