= List of Minnesota Twins minor league affiliates =

Current Minnesota Twins domestic minor league affiliate locations

The Minnesota Twins farm system consists of six Minor League Baseball affiliates across the United States and in the Dominican Republic. Four teams are independently owned, while two—the Florida Complex League Twins and Dominican Summer League Twins—are owned by the major league club.

The Twins have been affiliated with the Single-A Fort Myers Mighty Mussels of the Florida State League since 1993, making it the longest-running active affiliation in the organization among teams not owned by the Twins. The longest affiliation in franchise history was with the Elizabethton Twins, who were the team's Rookie affiliate in the Appalachian League for 47 seasons from 1974 to 2020. Their newest affiliates are the Triple-A St. Paul Saints of the International League and the Double-A Wichita Turbo Tubs of the Texas League, which became Twins affiliates in 2021.

Geographically, Minnesota's closest domestic affiliate is the St. Paul Saints, which are located approximately 10 miles (16 km) away. Their furthest domestic affiliates are the Fort Myers Mighty Mussels and Florida Complex League Twins of the Rookie Florida Complex League, which play at different ballparks at the same facility some 1,423 miles (2,290 km) away.

== Current affiliates ==
The Minnesota Twins farm system consists of six minor league affiliates.

| Class | Team | League | Location | Ballpark | Affiliated |
|---|---|---|---|---|---|
| Triple-A | St. Paul Saints | International League | Saint Paul, Minnesota | CHS Field | 2021 |
| Double-A | Wichita Turbo Tubs | Texas League | Wichita, Kansas | Equity Bank Park | 2021 |
| High-A | Cedar Rapids Kernels | Midwest League | Cedar Rapids, Iowa | Veterans Memorial Stadium | 2013 |
| Single-A | Fort Myers Mighty Mussels | Florida State League | Fort Myers, Florida | Hammond Stadium | 1993 |
| Rookie | FCL Twins | Florida Complex League | Fort Myers, Florida | Lee Health Sports Complex | 1989 |
| Rookie | DSL Twins | Dominican Summer League | Boca Chica, Santo Domingo | Baseball City Complex | 2001 |

== Past affiliates ==
=== Key ===
| Season | Each year is linked to an article about that particular team season. |

=== 1932–1962 ===
Minor League Baseball operated with five classes (Double-A, Class A, Class B, Class C, and Class D) from 1932 to 1935. Class A1, between Double-A and Class A, was added in 1936. The minors continued to operate with these six levels through 1945. Triple-A was established as the highest classification in 1946, and Class A1 became Double-A, with Class A through D remaining. These six levels continued through 1962. The Pacific Coast League (PCL) was reclassified from Triple-A to Open in 1952 due to the possibility of becoming a third major league. This arrangement ended following the 1957 season when the relocation of the National League's Dodgers and Giants to the West Coast ended any chance of the PCL being promoted.

| Season | Triple-A | Double-A | Class A | Class B | Class C | Class D | Ref. |
|---|---|---|---|---|---|---|---|
| 1932 | — | — | Chattanooga Lookouts | — | — | — | |
| 1933 | — | — | Chattanooga Lookouts | — | Springfield Chicks | — | |
| 1934 | — | — | Chattanooga Lookouts | — | — | — | |
| 1935 | — | Albany Senators | Chattanooga Lookouts | — | — | Panama City Pilots | |
| 1936 | — | Albany Senators | Chattanooga Lookouts (A1) | — | Brockville Pirates | Sanford Lookouts | |
| 1937 | — | — | Chattanooga Lookouts (A1); Trenton Senators | Charlotte Hornets; Jacksonville Tars | — | Salisbury Indians; Sanford Lookouts | |
| 1938 | — | — | Trenton Senators | Charlotte Hornets | — | Americus Cardinals; Salisbury Indians; Sanford Lookouts | |
| 1939 | — | — | Springfield Nationals | Charlotte Hornets; Greenville Spinners | Oswego Netherlands | Greensburg Senators; Greenville Greenies; Orlando Senators; Salisbury Senators; Sanford Lookouts; Shelby Nationals | |
| 1940 | — | — | — | Charlotte Hornets; Greenville Spinners; Selma Cloverleafs | — | DeLand Red Hats; Newport Canners; Orlando Senators; Salisbury Cardinals; Shelby Colonels; Thomasville Tourists | |
| 1941 | — | — | Chattanooga Lookouts (A1) | Charlotte Hornets; Greenville Spinners; Selma Cloverleafs | — | Orlando Senators; Thomasville Lookouts | |
| 1942 | — | — | Chattanooga Lookouts (A1) | Charlotte Hornets | — | Newport Canners | |
| 1943 | — | — | Chattanooga Lookouts (A1) / Montgomery Rebels (A1) | — | — | Kingsport Cherokees | |
| 1944 | — | — | Chattanooga Lookouts (A1); Williamsport Grays | — | — | — | |
| 1945 | — | — | Chattanooga Lookouts (A1); Williamsport Grays | — | — | — | |
| 1946 | — | Chattanooga Lookouts | — | Charlotte Hornets; Pensacola Fliers | — | Kingsport Cherokees; Orlando Senators | |
| 1947 | — | Chattanooga Lookouts | — | Charlotte Hornets | Havana Cubans | Brewton Millers; Kingsport Cherokees; Orlando Senators | |
| 1948 | — | Chattanooga Lookouts | — | Bridgeport Bees; Charlotte Hornets; Gadsden Pilots; Sherman–Denison Twins | Havana Cubans; Henderson Oilers | Big Spring Broncs; Emporia Nationals; Fulton Chicks; Orlando Senators | |
| 1949 | — | Chattanooga Lookouts | — | Charlotte Hornets; Hagerstown Owls; Havana Cubans | New Castle Nats | Concord Nationals; Emporia Nationals; Fulton Railroaders; Orlando Senators | |
| 1950 | — | Chattanooga Lookouts | Augusta Tigers | Charlotte Hornets; Havana Cubans | New Castle Chiefs | Concord Nationals; Emporia Nationals; Fulton Railroaders; Orlando Senators; Rome Red Sox; Wellsville Senators | |
| 1951 | — | Chattanooga Lookouts | — | Charlotte Hornets; Havana Cubans | Erie Sailors | Fulton Railroaders; Orlando Senators; Roanoke Rapids Jays | |
| 1952 | — | Chattanooga Lookouts | — | Charlotte Hornets; Danville Leafs; Havana Cubans | Drummondville Cubs | Fulton Lookouts; Orlando Senators; Roanoke Rapids Jays | |
| 1953 | — | Chattanooga Lookouts | Scranton Miners | Charlotte Hornets | — | Bluefield Blue-Grays; Fulton Lookouts; Orlando Senators | |
| 1954 | — | Chattanooga Lookouts | Charlotte Hornets | Hagerstown Packets; Rock Hill Chiefs | Wichita Falls Spudders / Sweetwater Spudders | Erie Senators; Fulton Lookouts; Orlando C.B.s | |
| 1955 | — | Chattanooga Lookouts | Charlotte Hornets | Hagerstown Packets; Rock Hill Chiefs | — | Erie Senators; Fulton Lookouts; Orlando C.B.s | |
| 1956 | Louisville Colonels | Chattanooga Lookouts | Charlotte Hornets | Hobbs Sports | Thibodaux Senators | Erie Senators; Fort Walton Beach Jets; Superior Senators | |
| 1957 | — | Chattanooga Lookouts | Charlotte Hornets | Kinston Eagles / Wilson Tobs; Midland Indians / Lamesa Indians | Missoula Timberjacks | Elmira Pioneers; Fort Walton Beach Jets; Superior Senators | |
| 1958 | — | Chattanooga Lookouts | Charlotte Hornets | Fox Cities Foxes | Missoula Timberjacks | Elmira Pioneers; Fort Walton Beach Jets; Gainesville G-Men; Superior Senators | |
| 1959 | — | Chattanooga Lookouts | Charlotte Hornets | Fox Cities Foxes | Missoula Timberjacks | Fort Walton Beach Jets; Lynchburg Senators; Sanford Greyhounds | |
| 1960 | Charleston Senators | — | Charlotte Hornets | Wilson Tobs | — | Erie Sailors; Fort Walton Beach Jets; Wytheville Senators | |
| 1961 | Syracuse Chiefs | Nashville Volunteers | Charlotte Hornets | Wilson Tobs | — | Erie Sailors; Fort Walton Beach Jets; Wytheville Twins | |
| 1962 | Vancouver Mounties | — | Charlotte Hornets | Wilson Tobs | Bismarck-Mandan Pards | Erie Sailors; Fort Walton Beach Jets; Wytheville Twins | |

=== 1963–1989 ===
Prior to the 1963 season, Major League Baseball (MLB) initiated a reorganization of Minor League Baseball that resulted in a reduction from six classes to four (Triple-A, Double-A, Class A, and Rookie) in response to the general decline of the minors throughout the 1950s and early-1960s when leagues and teams folded due to shrinking attendance caused by baseball fans' preference for staying at home to watch MLB games on television. The only change made within the next 27 years was Class A being subdivided for the first time to form Class A Short Season in 1966.

| Season | Triple-A | Double-A | Class A | Class A Short Season | Rookie | Ref. |
|---|---|---|---|---|---|---|
| 1963 | Dallas-Fort Worth Rangers | Charlotte Hornets | Bismarck-Mandan Pards; Erie Sailors; Orlando Twins; Wilson Tobs | — | Wytheville Twins | |
| 1964 | Atlanta Crackers | Charlotte Hornets | Bismarck-Mandan Pards; Orlando Twins; Wilson Tobs; Wisconsin Rapids Twins | — | Melbourne Twins | |
| 1965 | Denver Bears | Charlotte Hornets | Orlando Twins; St. Cloud Rox; Thomasville Hi-Toms; Wilson Tobs; Wisconsin Rapids Twins | — | FRL Twins | |
| 1966 | Denver Bears | Charlotte Hornets | Orlando Twins; Thomasville Hi-Toms; Wilson Tobs; Wisconsin Rapids Twins | St. Cloud Rox | GCL Twins | |
| 1967 | Denver Bears | Charlotte Hornets | Orlando Twins; Wilson Tobs; Wisconsin Rapids Twins | Auburn Twins; St. Cloud Rox | GCL Twins | |
| 1968 | Denver Bears | Charlotte Hornets | Orlando Twins; Wilson Tobs; Wisconsin Rapids Twins | Auburn Twins; St. Cloud Rox | GCL Twins | |
| 1969 | Denver Bears | Charlotte Hornets | Orlando Twins; Red Springs Twins; Wisconsin Rapids Twins | Auburn Twins; St. Cloud Rox | GCL Twins | |
| 1970 | Evansville Triplets | Charlotte Hornets | Lynchburg Twins; Orlando Twins; Wisconsin Rapids Twins | Auburn Twins; St. Cloud Rox | GCL Twins | |
| 1971 | Portland Beavers | Charlotte Hornets | Lynchburg Twins; Orlando Twins; Wisconsin Rapids Twins | Auburn Twins; St. Cloud Rox | GCL Twins | |
| 1972 | Tacoma Twins | Charlotte Hornets | Charlotte Twins; Lynchburg Twins; Orlando Twins; Wisconsin Rapids Twins | — | Melbourne Twins | |
| 1973 | Tacoma Twins | Orlando Twins | Lynchburg Twins; Wisconsin Rapids Twins | Geneva Twins | — | |
| 1974 | Tacoma Twins | Orlando Twins | Lynchburg Twins; Wisconsin Rapids Twins | — | Elizabethton Twins | |
| 1975 | Tacoma Twins | Orlando Twins | Reno Silver Sox (Note: In 1975 and 1976, the Twins shared the Class A Reno Silver Sox with the San Diego Padres.); Wisconsin Rapids Twins | — | Elizabethton Twins | |
| 1976 | Tacoma Twins | Orlando Twins | Reno Silver Sox; Wisconsin Rapids Twins | — | Elizabethton Twins | |
| 1977 | Tacoma Twins | Orlando Twins | Visalia Oaks; Wisconsin Rapids Twins | — | Elizabethton Twins | |
| 1978 | Toledo Mud Hens | Orlando Twins | Visalia Oaks; Wisconsin Rapids Twins | — | Elizabethton Twins | |
| 1979 | Toledo Mud Hens | Orlando Twins | Visalia Oaks; Wisconsin Rapids Twins | — | Elizabethton Twins | |
| 1980 | Toledo Mud Hens | Orlando Twins | Visalia Oaks; Wisconsin Rapids Twins | — | Elizabethton Twins | |
| 1981 | Toledo Mud Hens | Orlando Twins | Visalia Oaks; Wisconsin Rapids Twins | — | Elizabethton Twins | |
| 1982 | Toledo Mud Hens | Orlando Twins | Visalia Oaks; Wisconsin Rapids Twins | — | Elizabethton Twins | |
| 1983 | Toledo Mud Hens | Orlando Twins | Visalia Oaks; Wisconsin Rapids Twins | — | Elizabethton Twins | |
| 1984 | Toledo Mud Hens | Orlando Twins | Kenosha Twins; Visalia Oaks | — | Elizabethton Twins | |
| 1985 | Toledo Mud Hens | Orlando Twins | Kenosha Twins; Visalia Oaks | — | Elizabethton Twins | |
| 1986 | Toledo Mud Hens | Orlando Twins | Kenosha Twins; Visalia Oaks | — | Elizabethton Twins | |
| 1987 | Portland Beavers | Orlando Twins | Kenosha Twins; Visalia Oaks | — | Elizabethton Twins | |
| 1988 | Portland Beavers | Orlando Twins | Kenosha Twins; Visalia Oaks | — | Elizabethton Twins | |
| 1989 | Portland Beavers | Orlando Twins | Kenosha Twins; Visalia Oaks | — | Elizabethton Twins; GCL Twins | |

=== 1990–2020 ===
Minor League Baseball operated with six classes from 1990 to 2020. In 1990, the Class A level was subdivided for a second time with the creation of Class A-Advanced. The Rookie level consisted of domestic and foreign circuits. The Twins did not field a Class A Short Season team during this period.

| Season | Triple-A | Double-A | Class A-Advanced | Class A | Rookie | Foreign Rookie | Ref. |
|---|---|---|---|---|---|---|---|
| 1990 | Portland Beavers | Orlando Sun Rays | Visalia Oaks | Kenosha Twins | Elizabethton Twins; GCL Twins | — | |
| 1991 | Portland Beavers | Orlando Sun Rays | Visalia Oaks | Kenosha Twins | Elizabethton Twins; GCL Twins | — | |
| 1992 | Portland Beavers | Orlando Sun Rays | Visalia Oaks | Kenosha Twins | Elizabethton Twins; GCL Twins | — | |
| 1993 | Portland Beavers | Nashville Xpress | Fort Myers Miracle | Fort Wayne Wizards | Elizabethton Twins; GCL Twins | — | |
| 1994 | Salt Lake Buzz | Nashville Xpress | Fort Myers Miracle | Fort Wayne Wizards | Elizabethton Twins; GCL Twins | — | |
| 1995 | Salt Lake Buzz | Hardware City Rock Cats | Fort Myers Miracle | Fort Wayne Wizards | Elizabethton Twins; GCL Twins | — | |
| 1996 | Salt Lake Buzz | Hardware City Rock Cats | Fort Myers Miracle | Fort Wayne Wizards | Elizabethton Twins; GCL Twins | — | |
| 1997 | Salt Lake Buzz | New Britain Rock Cats | Fort Myers Miracle | Fort Wayne Wizards | Elizabethton Twins; GCL Twins | — | |
| 1998 | Salt Lake Buzz | New Britain Rock Cats | Fort Myers Miracle | Fort Wayne Wizards | Elizabethton Twins; GCL Twins | DSL Twins/Co-op | |
| 1999 | Salt Lake Buzz | New Britain Rock Cats | Fort Myers Miracle | Quad Cities River Bandits | Elizabethton Twins; GCL Twins | DSL Twins/Co-op | |
| 2000 | Salt Lake Buzz | New Britain Rock Cats | Fort Myers Miracle | Quad Cities River Bandits | Elizabethton Twins; GCL Twins | DSL Twins/Indians | |
| 2001 | Edmonton Trappers | New Britain Rock Cats | Fort Myers Miracle | Quad Cities River Bandits | Elizabethton Twins; GCL Twins | DSL Twins | |
| 2002 | Edmonton Trappers | New Britain Rock Cats | Fort Myers Miracle | Quad Cities River Bandits | Elizabethton Twins; GCL Twins | DSL Twins; VSL Cagua (Note: In 2002, the Twins operated a Venezuelan Summer League team as a co-op with the Cincinnati Reds.) | |
| 2003 | Rochester Red Wings | New Britain Rock Cats | Fort Myers Miracle | Quad Cities River Bandits | Elizabethton Twins; GCL Twins | DSL Twins; VSL Tronconero 1 (Note: In 2003, the Twins operated a Venezuelan Summer League team as a co-op with the San Diego Padres.) | |
| 2004 | Rochester Red Wings | New Britain Rock Cats | Fort Myers Miracle | Quad Cities River Bandits | Elizabethton Twins; GCL Twins | DSL Twins | |
| 2005 | Rochester Red Wings | New Britain Rock Cats | Fort Myers Miracle | Beloit Snappers | Elizabethton Twins; GCL Twins | DSL Twins | |
| 2006 | Rochester Red Wings | New Britain Rock Cats | Fort Myers Miracle | Beloit Snappers | Elizabethton Twins; GCL Twins | DSL Twins; VSL Twins/Blue Jays | |
| 2007 | Rochester Red Wings | New Britain Rock Cats | Fort Myers Miracle | Beloit Snappers | Elizabethton Twins; GCL Twins | DSL Twins; VSL Twins/Cubs | |
| 2008 | Rochester Red Wings | New Britain Rock Cats | Fort Myers Miracle | Beloit Snappers | Elizabethton Twins; GCL Twins | DSL Twins | |
| 2009 | Rochester Red Wings | New Britain Rock Cats | Fort Myers Miracle | Beloit Snappers | Elizabethton Twins; GCL Twins | DSL Twins | |
| 2010 | Rochester Red Wings | New Britain Rock Cats | Fort Myers Miracle | Beloit Snappers | Elizabethton Twins; GCL Twins | DSL Twins | |
| 2011 | Rochester Red Wings | New Britain Rock Cats | Fort Myers Miracle | Beloit Snappers | Elizabethton Twins; GCL Twins | DSL Twins | |
| 2012 | Rochester Red Wings | New Britain Rock Cats | Fort Myers Miracle | Beloit Snappers | Elizabethton Twins; GCL Twins | DSL Twins | |
| 2013 | Rochester Red Wings | New Britain Rock Cats | Fort Myers Miracle | Cedar Rapids Kernels | Elizabethton Twins; GCL Twins | DSL Twins | |
| 2014 | Rochester Red Wings | New Britain Rock Cats | Fort Myers Miracle | Cedar Rapids Kernels | Elizabethton Twins; GCL Twins | DSL Twins | |
| 2015 | Rochester Red Wings | Chattanooga Lookouts | Fort Myers Miracle | Cedar Rapids Kernels | Elizabethton Twins; GCL Twins | DSL Twins | |
| 2016 | Rochester Red Wings | Chattanooga Lookouts | Fort Myers Miracle | Cedar Rapids Kernels | Elizabethton Twins; GCL Twins | DSL Twins | |
| 2017 | Rochester Red Wings | Chattanooga Lookouts | Fort Myers Miracle | Cedar Rapids Kernels | Elizabethton Twins; GCL Twins | DSL Twins | |
| 2018 | Rochester Red Wings | Chattanooga Lookouts | Fort Myers Miracle | Cedar Rapids Kernels | Elizabethton Twins; GCL Twins | DSL Twins | |
| 2019 | Rochester Red Wings | Pensacola Blue Wahoos | Fort Myers Miracle | Cedar Rapids Kernels | Elizabethton Twins; GCL Twins | DSL Twins | |
| 2020 (Note: The 2020 Minor League Baseball season was cancelled due to the COVID-19 pandemic.) | Rochester Red Wings | Pensacola Blue Wahoos | Fort Myers Mighty Mussels | Cedar Rapids Kernels | Elizabethton Twins; GCL Twins | DSL Twins | |

=== 2021–present ===
The current structure of Minor League Baseball is the result of an overall contraction of the system beginning with the 2021 season. Class A was reduced to two levels: High-A and Low-A. Low-A was reclassified as Single-A in 2022.

| Season | Triple-A | Double-A | High-A | Single-A | Rookie | Foreign Rookie | Ref. |
|---|---|---|---|---|---|---|---|
| 2021 | St. Paul Saints | Wichita Wind Surge | Cedar Rapids Kernels | Fort Myers Mighty Mussels | FCL Twins | DSL Twins | |
| 2022 | St. Paul Saints | Wichita Wind Surge | Cedar Rapids Kernels | Fort Myers Mighty Mussels | FCL Twins | DSL Twins | |
| 2023 | St. Paul Saints | Wichita Wind Surge | Cedar Rapids Kernels | Fort Myers Mighty Mussels | FCL Twins | DSL Twins | |
| 2024 | St. Paul Saints | Wichita Wind Surge | Cedar Rapids Kernels | Fort Myers Mighty Mussels | FCL Twins | DSL Twins | |
| 2025 | St. Paul Saints | Wichita Wind Surge | Cedar Rapids Kernels | Fort Myers Mighty Mussels | FCL Twins | DSL Twins | |
| 2026 | St. Paul Saints | Wichita Wind Surge | Cedar Rapids Kernels | Fort Myers Mighty Mussels | FCL Twins | DSL Twins | |
