= Charlie Bowles =

American baseball player (1917–2003)

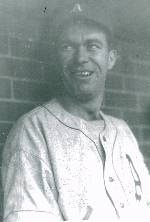
- Pitcher
- Born: March 15, 1917; Norwood, Massachusetts, U.S.
- Died: December 23, 2003 (aged 86); Hickory, North Carolina, U.S.
- Batted: Right Threw: Right

MLB debut
- September 25, 1943, for the Philadelphia Athletics

Last MLB appearance
- September 19, 1945, for the Philadelphia Athletics

MLB statistics
- Win–loss record: 1–4
- Earned run average: 4.38
- Strikeouts: 17
- Stats at Baseball Reference

Teams
- Philadelphia Athletics (1943, 1945)

Charles James Bowles (March 15, 1917, in Norwood, Massachusetts, United States – December 23, 2003, in Newton, North Carolina, United States) was an American right-handed Major League Baseball (MLB) pitcher who played for the Philadelphia Athletics in 1943 and 1945. He later managed in the minor leagues.

== Playing career ==
Bowles began his professional career in 1937 with the Beckley Bengals, at the age of 20. He went 16–7 with a 3.83 ERA in 27 games (19 starts) that year. He spent 1938 with the Welch Miners and Bluefield Blue–Grays, going a combined 8–11 with a 5.20 ERA in 27 games. He played with Welch again in 1939, going 9–8 with a 5.43 ERA in 20 games (16 starts).

He went 6–3 with a 5.81 ERA in 23 games for the Monroe White Sox in 1940. In 1941, he played for the Monroe White Sox and El Dorado Oilers, going a combined 8–13 with a 6.14 ERA. He split the 1942 season between the Lancaster Red Roses and Richmond Colts, going a combined 10–13 with an unknown overall ERA. His ERA with the Red Roses, however, was 3.22.

He spent most of 1943 with the Red Roses, going 19–14 with a 3.52 ERA. On September 25, 1943, he made his big league debut. He started two games with the Athletics that year, going 1–1 with a 3.00 ERA. He did not play in 1944, and he made eight appearances for the Athletics in 1945, starting four of the games. That year, he went 0–3 with a 5.13 ERA. On September 19, 1945, he appeared in his final big league game.

Although his major league career was over, his professional career was not. He split 1946 between the Red Roses and Atlanta Crackers, going 2–5 in 24 games. With the St. Petersburg Saints in 1947, he went 14–14 with a 3.35 ERA. He was with the Palatka Azaleas and St. Petersburg Saints in 1948, going a combined 8–7 with a 4.44 ERA in 33 games. He spent part of the year as the Azaleas' manager, his first foray into minor league managing.

In 1949, he was one of a few managers for the Salisbury Pirates. He did not play at all that year. Similarly, he did not play in 1950, as he served as the Waterbury Timers manager for part of the season. Again, in 1951 he did not play at all, as he served as manager of the Granite Falls Graniteers for part of the season.

He resumed playing in 1952, though on a limited basis - in 1952 with the Charleston Senators, he went 0–1 with a 58.50 ERA in two games. He also managed the Hickory Rebels for part of the 1952 season. He played in 23 games, making six starts, for the Wilkes-Barre Barons in 1953, going 4–2 with a 3.08 ERA. He finished his career in 1954, appearing in one game for the Winston-Salem Twins.

Overall, he went 1–4 with a 4.38 ERA in 10 major league games (six starts). In the minors, he went 105–98 with an ERA around 4.28 in 324 games.
