= Ashland Colonels =

- 1939–1942; Ashland, Kentucky

Minor league affiliations
- Class: Class D (1939-1941); Class C (1942)
- League: Mountain State League

Major league affiliations
- Team: Chicago Cubs (1942)

Team data
- Ballpark: Armco Field

The Ashland Colonels were a Mountain State League minor league baseball team based in Ashland, Kentucky, United States that played from 1939 to 1942. They were affiliated with the Chicago Cubs in their final year of existence. They played at Armco Field for all four years they were in Ashland.

They were the first team based in Ashland since the Ashland-Catlettsburg Twins in 1912 and the last team from that city until the Tri-State Tomahawks of the Frontier League arrived in 1993.

Notable players and managers include Ray French, Tommy Thevenow, Bill Kennedy, Nelson Burbrink, Moe Burtschy, Chuck Kress, Ed Hock and Pete Elko.
