= Williamson Red Birds =

- 1937–1942; Williamson, West Virginia

Minor league affiliations
- Previous classes: Class D
- League: Mountain State League

Major league affiliations
- Previous teams: St. Louis Cardinals (1939–1942)

Minor league titles
- League titles: 1940

Team data
- Previous names: Williamson Red Birds (1939–1942); Williamson Colts (1937–1938)

The Williamson Red Birds were a Mountain State League baseball team based in Williamson, West Virginia, United States that played from 1939 to 1942. They were affiliated with the St. Louis Cardinals.

They made the playoffs every year they existed, winning the league championship in 1940, under Harrison Wickel.

The team was previously named the Williamson Colts from 1937 to 1938. The Class-D team was managed by Nat Hickey in both years of its existence. Under his leadership, the team made the playoffs both seasons, finishing third both years, but it did not win a league championship either time.

Walter Sessi and, most notably, baseball Hall of Famer Stan Musial played for the team.

== Notable alumni ==
- Stan Musial (1938–1939) Inducted Baseball Hall of Fame, 1969
- Ken Holcombe (1939)
- Del Rice (1941–1942) MLB All-Star
- Hal Rice (1941–1942)
- Walter Sessi (1937, 1939)
