= John Finley (Finleyville) =

American settler

- Born: June 2, 1759; Cecil County, Maryland
- Died: March 25, 1846 (aged 86)
- Resting place: Bethel Park, Pennsylvania, corner of Broughton Rd. and Linhart Dr.
- Occupation: farmer
- Known for: namesake of Finleyville, Pennsylvania
- Spouse: Margaret Rolland
- Parent: Robert Finley

John Finley (1759-1846) was a pioneer settler of western Pennsylvania. He was born in Cecil County, Maryland and served in the American Revolution. After the war, he moved to Pennsylvania, and in 1788, purchased a land grant known as "Mount Pleasant" from James Barclay.
