= Carlos Ratliff =

American athlete and coach (1910–1961)

Biographical details
- Born: October 18, 1910
- Died: October 3, 1961 (aged 50); Morgantown, West Virginia, U.S.

Playing career

Football
- 1929–1932: Glenville State

Baseball
- 1937–1938: Bluefield Blue–Grays
- 1938: Welch Miners
- 1942: Welch Miners
- Positions: Shortstop, third baseman (baseball)

Coaching career (HC unless noted)

Football
- 1946–1952: Glenville State

Basketball
- 1945–1951: Glenville State

Baseball
- 1944: Iowa Pre-Flight
- 1947: Glenville State

Head coaching record
- Overall: 69–72 (college basketball)

Carlos Clayton Ratliff (October 18, 1910 – October 3, 1961) was an American football, basketball and baseball player and coach. He served as the head football coach (1946–1952), head basketball coach (1945–1951), and head baseball coach (1947) at Glenville State College in Glenville, West Virginia.
