= Joe Linsalata =

American baseball player and umpire

- Born: Joseph Nicholas Linsalata; June 17, 1916; Brooklyn, New York, U.S.
- Died: January 25, 2000 (aged 83); Hollywood, Florida, U.S.
- Occupation: Umpire
- Years active: 1961
- Employer: American League

Joseph Nicholas Linsalata (June 17, 1916 – January 25, 2000) was an American professional baseball player and umpire.

== Career ==
From 1938 to 1940, he caught in the minor leagues with the Sydney Steel Citians and the Bluefield Blue–Grays.

Linsalata's umpiring career began in 1948 in the Class C Florida International League, and he spent 11 years (1950–1960) in the Triple-A International League before being summoned to the majors in time for the 1961 season, when the American League expanded from eight to ten clubs, necessitating an expanded squad of arbiters. Linsalata umpired 166 AL games in 1961, 40 of them behind the plate. He ejected seven players or managers during the campaign.

He returned to the International League in 1962, umpiring in that top-level circuit into the 1976 season.

== Death ==
Linsalata died in Hollywood, Florida in 2000.
