= Finleyville, Pennsylvania =

Borough in Pennsylvania, US

Finleyville
- Borough
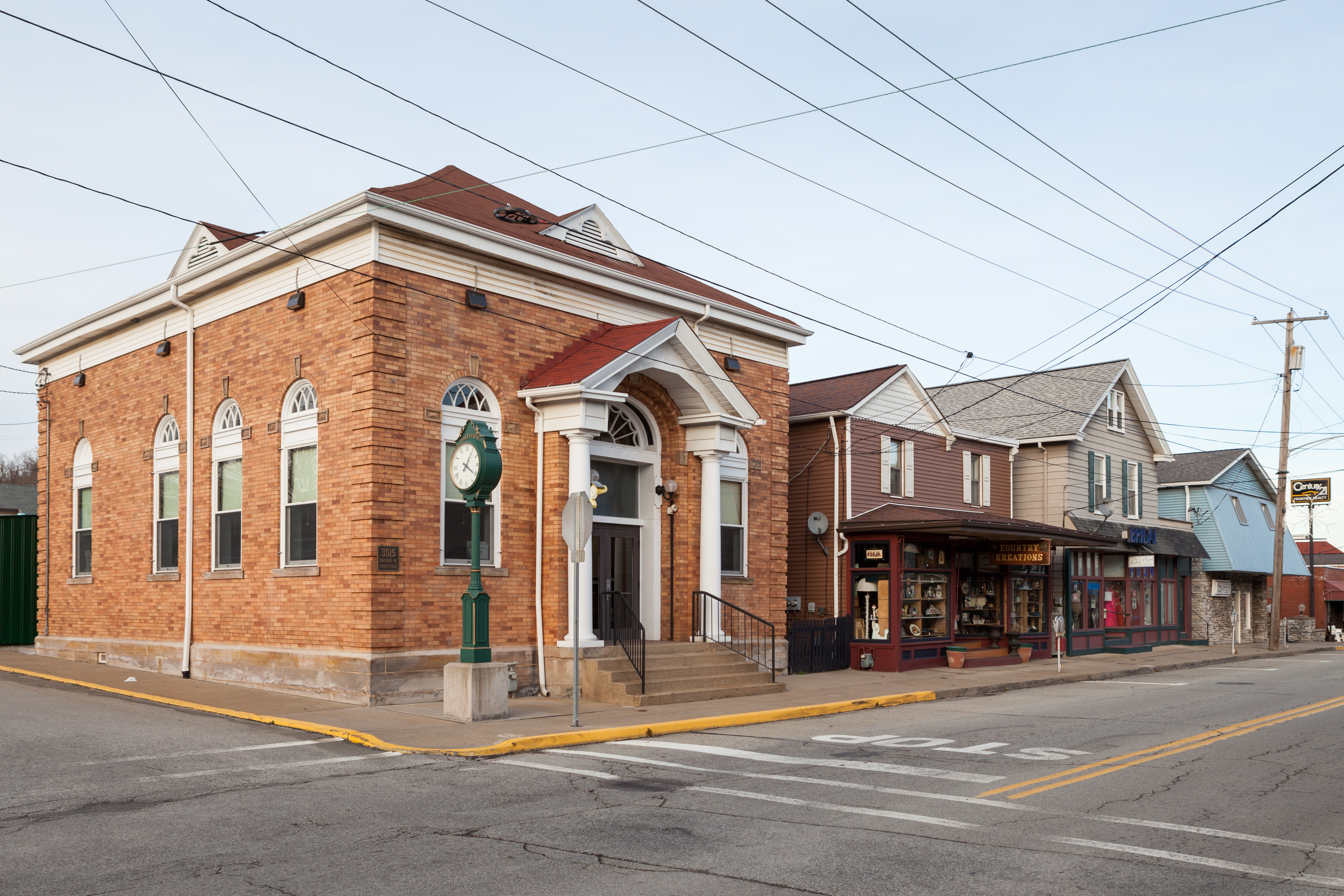
- Borough building at the intersection of Washington and Extension Avenues, December 2014
- Etymology: John Finley
- Location of Finleyville in Washington County, Pennsylvania.

- Location of Finleyville in Pennsylvania
- Coordinates: 40°15′10″N 80°0′13″W
- Country: United States
- State: Pennsylvania
- County: Washington
- Established: 1896

Government
  - Mayor: Michael M. Kutsek

Area
  - Total: 0.17 sq mi (0.43 km^{2})
  - Land: 0.17 sq mi (0.43 km^{2})
  - Water: 0 sq mi (0.00 km^{2})

Population (2020)
  - Total: 376
  - Density: 2,247.9/sq mi (867.93/km^{2})
- Time zone: UTC-4 (EST)
  - Summer (DST): UTC-5 (EDT)
- ZIP code: 15332
- Area code: 724
- FIPS code: 42-25944
- Website: www.finleyvilleboro.com

Finleyville is a borough in Washington County, Pennsylvania, United States, named for John Finley. The population was 375 at the 2020 census. It was built at the junction of Brownsville Road (now Pennsylvania Route 88) and the 'Washington Road' from Cox's Fort to Catfish Camp, now Washington, Pennsylvania. It was originally known as "Rowgalley" until after a large contingent of Scots-Irish came to town including a number of "Finleys." It is in the Peters Creek watershed.

== Geography ==
Finleyville is located at 40°15′10″N 80°0′13″W (40.252662, -80.003505).

According to the United States Census Bureau, the borough has a total area of 0.2 square miles (0.52 km^{2}), all land.

== Demographics ==
Historical population
Census	Pop.	Note	%±
1900	447		—
1910	644		44.1%
1920	609		−5.4%
1930	595		−2.3%
1940	699		17.5%
1950	684		−2.1%
1960	582		−14.9%
1970	379		−34.9%
1980	402		6.1%
1990	446		10.9%
2000	459		2.9%
2010	461		0.4%
2020	376		−18.4%
2025 (est.)	360	▼	−4.3%

As of the census of 2000, there were 459 people, 240 households, and 112 families residing in the borough. The population density was 2,729.7 inhabitants per square mile (1,053.9/km^{2}). There were 271 housing units at an average density of 1,611.6 per square mile (622.2/km^{2}). The racial makeup of the borough was 91.72% White, 5.88% African American, 0.87% Asian, 0.22% from other races, and 1.31% from two or more races. Hispanic or Latino of any race were 0.65% of the population.

There were 240 households, out of which 22.5% had children under the age of 18 living with them, 32.1% were married couples living together, 12.1% had a female householder with no husband present, and 53.3% were non-families. 50.0% of all households were made up of individuals, and 18.8% had someone living alone who was 65 years of age or older. The average household size was 1.91 and the average family size was 2.82.

In the borough the population was spread out, with 20.0% under the age of 18, 6.1% from 18 to 24, 35.3% from 25 to 44, 19.8% from 45 to 64, and 18.7% who were 65 years of age or older. The median age was 38 years. For every 100 females, there were 92.1 males. For every 100 females age 18 and over, there were 90.2 males.

The median income for a household in the borough was $29,375, and the median income for a family was $38,125. Males had a median income of $31,818 versus $21,827 for females. The per capita income for the borough was $18,387. About 9.3% of families and 11.1% of the population were below the poverty line, including 12.1% of those under age 18 and 23.9% of those age 65 or over.

== Education ==
It is in the Ringgold School District.

== Notable people ==
- Bob West, original voice of Barney the Dinosaur in Barney & Friends, born in Finleyville
- Walter Sessi (1918–1998), Major League Baseball outfielder
- Joe Montana, football player, educated in Finleyville
