= Rufus Hatten =

American baseball player

- Catcher
- Born: June 16, 1912; Panama City, Florida, U.S.
- Died: December 1968; Ocala, Florida, U.S.
- Batted: Right Threw: Right

Negro league baseball debut
- 1942, for the Memphis Red Sox

Last appearance
- 1946, for the Baltimore Elite Giants
- Stats at Baseball Reference

Teams
- Memphis Red Sox (1942); Chicago American Giants (1944); Baltimore Elite Giants (1946)

Rufus Hatten (June 16, 1912 – December 1968) was an American Negro league catcher in the 1940s.

A native of Panama City, Florida, Hatten made his Negro leagues debut in 1942 with the Memphis Red Sox, and went on to play for the Chicago American Giants and Baltimore Elite Giants through 1946. In 1952, he played minor league baseball for the Bluefield Blue-Grays. Hatten died in Ocala, Florida in 1968 at age 56.
