= Huntington Boosters =

- 1931–1942; Huntington, West Virginia

Minor league affiliations
- Previous classes: Class C (1942); Class D (1937–1941); Class C (1931–1936)
- League: Mountain State League (1937–1942)
- Previous leagues: Middle Atlantic League (1931–1936)

Major league affiliations
- Previous teams: St. Louis Browns (1942); St. Louis Cardinals (1934–1936); Brooklyn Dodgers (1939); Detroit Tigers (1932–1933)

Team data
- Previous names: Huntington Jewels (1942); Huntington Aces (1940–1941); Huntington Boosters (1939); Huntington Bees (1938); Huntington Boosters (1937); Huntington Red Birds (1934–1936); Huntington Boosters (1931–1933)
- Previous parks: Long Civic Field

The Huntington Boosters were a Middle Atlantic League (1931–1933) and Mountain State League (1937, 1939) minor league baseball team based in Huntington, West Virginia. It was affiliated with the Detroit Tigers in 1932 and 1933 and with the Brooklyn Dodgers in 1939. It was the first team to be based in Huntington since the Huntington Blue Sox of the Ohio State League disbanded in 1916. Baseball Hall of Fame inductee Walter Alston played for Huntington in 1936.

From 1934 to 1936, the team was known as the Huntington Red Birds and in 1938 it was known as the Huntington Bees. That year, it was managed by Dickey Kerr, while Mike Sandlock and Hank LaManna played for the team. It became the Huntington Aces in 1940. As the Aces, Sheriff Blake, Russ Young, Pee-Wee Wanninger and Ezra Midkiff each managed the team at some point, despite the team lasting only two seasons under that name. Of note, Cliff Fannin and Ken Wood, who both spent over half a decade in Major League Baseball, played the team when it was known as the Jewels.

Multiple major league players spent time with the team when it was called the Boosters, including 1945 All-Star second baseman Eddie Mayo. He was with the team in 1933.

== Notable alumni ==
- Walter Alston (1936) Inducted Baseball Hall of Fame, 1983
- Rube Benton (1933)
- Sheriff Blake (1941)
- Cliff Fannin (1942)
- Orville Jorgens (1931)
- Dickey Kerr (1938)
- Marty Marion (1936) 8 x MLB all-Star; 1944 NL Most Valuable Player
- Eddie Mayo (1932) MLB All-Star
- Bernie Neis (1933)
- Johnny Stuart (1931)
- Ken Wood (1942)
