= Vic Sorrell =

American baseball player (1901–1972)

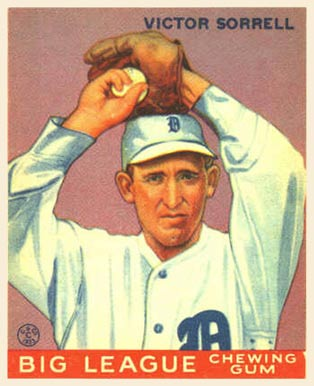
- Pitcher
- Born: April 9, 1901; Morrisville, North Carolina, U.S.
- Died: May 4, 1972 (aged 71); Raleigh, North Carolina, U.S.
- Batted: Right Threw: Right

MLB debut
- April 22, 1928, for the Detroit Tigers

Last MLB appearance
- June 3, 1937, for the Detroit Tigers

MLB statistics
- Win–loss record: 92–101
- Earned run average: 4.43
- Strikeouts: 619
- Stats at Baseball Reference

Teams
- Detroit Tigers (1928–1937)

Career highlights and awards
- World Series champion (1935)

Victor Garland Sorrell (April 9, 1901 – May 4, 1972), nicknamed "Lawyer" and "the Philosopher", was an American Major League pitcher who played his entire career with the Detroit Tigers. In 10 Major League seasons, Sorrell had a 92–101 record with a 4.43 career ERA. Sorrell also coached the North Carolina State University baseball team from 1946 to 1966.

== Early life ==
Sorrelll was born in born in Morrisville, North Carolina. He attended Cary High School in Cary, North Carolina, graduating in 1923. He attended Wake Forest University. Sorrell was the subject of an eligibility controversy at Wake Forest in 1925. In April 1925, in a game attended by 8,000 fans, North Carolina State College challenged Sorrell's eligibility, claiming he had played in an excessive number of games per week in semi-pro baseball the previous summer. Following the challenge, Sorrell went on to pitch a 12-inning victory.

== Professional playing career ==
He did not break into Major League baseball until he was age 27. After the eligibility controversy at Wake Forest, Sorrell jumped from college to the Toronto Maple Leafs of the International League and posted an 8–0, 3.08 record in 1926. He won his first four decisions with the Maple Leafs in 1927, giving him 12 victories in pro ball before he suffered his first loss. In 1927, he went 14–8, 3.98 and finally caught the attention of a major league scout from Detroit.

In 1928, Sorrell joined the Tigers and played there for ten years. He was one of the first major league pitchers to wear glasses. Sorrell was a starting pitcher and workhorse for the Tigers from 1928 to 1933, starting 175 games, and completing 80, in his first 6 seasons. His best season was 1930, when Sorrell had a 16–11 record, and was among the American League leaders in ERA (7th), wins (8th) and shutouts (4th). Sorrell was also among the AL leaders in strikeouts in 1931 with 99.

In 1934, the Tigers had the best season in the team's history, winning the American League pennant with a record of 101–53. Despite a high-scoring Detroit attack that included Hall of Famers Hank Greenberg, Charlie Gehringer, Mickey Cochrane, and Goose Goslin, Sorrell started only 28 games in 1934 (the fewest of his career to that point) and finished with a 6–9 record and a 4.79 ERA. Sorrell did not see action in the 1934 World Series.

In 1935, the Tigers won the first World Series in team history, but Sorrell's production continued to fade as he continued as a spot starter. He started only 8 games and pitched only 51 1/3 innings, with a 4–3 record. Once again, Sorrell did not play in the World Series.

Sorrell played two more seasons in 1936 and 1937, mostly as a reliever. He finished 6th in the American League in saves in 1936. He played his final game in June 1937 at age 36.

== Managerial career ==
After leaving Major League Baseball, Sorrell managed Bluefield of the Mountain State League in 1939-40. For 21 years (1946–66) he was head coach at North Carolina State with a 223–196, and 5 ties. His 21-year tenure as head coach is tied by Sam Esposito for the second longest baseball coaching career at NCSU. Under Sorrell the Pack went 96–89 in 13 years in the ACC, twenty-nine players were picked for all-Conference honors, and three were named all-Americans. According to player Bob Kennel (class of 1958), Coach Sorrell was a "pure baseball man." He also was listed as a scout for the Tigers in 1948.

Sorrell died at age 71 on May 4, 1972, in Raleigh, North Carolina.

Sorrell was posthumously elected to the Wake Forest University Athletics Hall of Fame in 2003.

== See also ==
- 1935 Detroit Tigers season
- List of Major League Baseball players who spent their entire career with one franchise
