= Dominican Summer League Twins =

- Boca Chica

Minor league affiliations
- Class: Rookie
- League: Dominican Summer League
- Division: Boca Chica Baseball City

Major league affiliations
- Team: Minnesota Twins

Minor league titles
- League titles (0): None

Team data
- Name: Twins
- Ballpark: Baseball City Complex
- Owner(s)/ Operator(s): Minnesota Twins
- Manager: Jimmy Alvarez

The Dominican Summer League Twins or DSL Twins are a Rookie League affiliate of the Minnesota Twins based in the Dominican Republic. They play in the Dominican Summer League. As an independent affiliate, they have been in existence since 2001.

== History ==
The team first came into existence in 1998. For the 1998 and 1999 seasons, they had a cooperative affiliation and were known as the DSL Twins/Co-op. In 2000, they shared an affiliation with the Cleveland Indians and were called the DSL Twins/Indians. They have been independently affiliated with the Twins since 2001.

== Roster ==
Dominican Summer League Twins roster
Players		Coaches/Other
Pitchers: 71 Nestor Cafe; 65 Aaron Carranza; -- Santiago Castellanos; -- Angel Castillo; -- Raymi Castillo; -- Brandy Ceballos; 19 Enyer Cepeda; 68 Anderson Chacon; 48 Manuel Compres; -- Juan Figaro; 20 Eudy Garcia; 35 Cristian Hernandez; -- Jensi Infante; -- Eliezer Lucena; -- Rainer Marin; -- Marlon Mirabal; -- Omar Montano; -- Sebastian Pulido; -- Juan Quinones; 64 Anderson Ramos; 33 Melvin Rodriguez; 25 Santiago Rojas; 56 Leonardo Rondon; 21 Yoel Roque; -- Diego Rosal; 67 Jeicol Surumay; -- Eli Urena; 74 Aiberson Ventura; 43 Ramiro Villanueva	Catchers: -- Pablo Castillo; 59 Victor Leal; 18 Irvin Nunez; -- Aaron Salazar; 26 Carlos Silva; Infielders: -- Darwin Almanzar; -- Jose Barrios; -- Harritzon Castillo; 1 Daiber De Los Santos; -- Dencer Diaz; 30 Ramiro Dominguez; -- Santiago Leon; 8 Guillermo Sosa; -- Jamesson Val; Outfielders: 27 Eduardo Beltre; -- Cristian Bonifacio; -- Yovanny Duran; 17 Luis Fragoza; 2 Merphy Hernandez; 55 Yandro Hernandez; 4 Ricardo Paez; -- Joyner Perez; -- Jhomnardo Reyes; -- Teilon Serrano	Manager: 38 Rafael Martinez; Coaches: -- Dylan Hawley (pitching); -- Erick Julio (pitching); -- Ruben Santana (infield); 7-day injured list * On Minnesota Twins 40-man roster ~ Development list # Rehab assignment ∞ Reserve list ‡ Restricted list § Suspended list † Temporarily inactive list Roster updated February 28, 2025; Transactions → More rosters: MiLB • Dominican Summer League → Minnesota Twins minor league players
