= Don Manno =

American baseball player (1915-1995)

- Left fielder / Third baseman
- Born: May 4, 1915; Williamsport, Pennsylvania, U.S.
- Died: March 11, 1995 (aged 79); Williamsport, Pennsylvania, U.S.
- Batted: Right Threw: Right

MLB debut
- September 22, 1940, for the Boston Bees

Last MLB appearance
- July 10, 1941, for the Boston Braves

MLB statistics
- Batting average: .189
- Home runs: 1
- Runs batted in: 8
- Stats at Baseball Reference

Teams
- Boston Bees / Braves (1940–1941)

Donald D. Manno (May 4, 1915 – March 11, 1995) was an American Major League Baseball player. He played two seasons with the Boston Bees / Braves from 1940 to 1941.
