= Bud Clancy =

American baseball player (1900–1968)

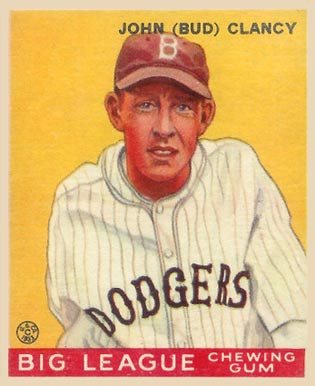
- First baseman
- Born: September 15, 1900; Odell, Illinois, U.S.
- Died: September 26, 1968 (aged 68); Ottumwa, Iowa, U.S.
- Batted: Left Threw: Left

MLB debut
- August 29, 1924, for the Chicago White Sox

Last MLB appearance
- June 27, 1934, for the Philadelphia Phillies

MLB statistics
- Batting average: .281
- Home runs: 12
- Runs batted in: 198
- Stats at Baseball Reference

Teams
- Chicago White Sox (1924–1930); Brooklyn Dodgers (1932); Philadelphia Phillies (1934)

John William "Bud" Clancy (September 15, 1900 – September 26, 1968) was an American professional baseball first baseman. He played ten seasons in Major League Baseball (MLB) from 1924 to 1934 for the Chicago White Sox, Brooklyn Dodgers, and Philadelphia Phillies.

While playing for the White Sox in 1930, Clancy became the first first baseman since 1891 to record no putouts or assists in a nine inning game.

In 522 games over nine seasons, Clancy posted a .281 batting average (504-for-1796) with 204 runs, 69 doubles, 26 triples, 12 home runs, 198 RBIs, 111 bases on balls, .325 on-base percentage and .368 slugging percentage. He finished his career with a .992 fielding percentage as a first baseman.
