= Logan Indians =

- 1937–1942; Logan, West Virginia

Minor league affiliations
- Previous classes: Class C (1942); Class D (1937-1941)
- League: Mountain State League

Major league affiliations
- Previous teams: Cleveland Indians (1939)

Minor league titles
- League titles: 1941

The Logan Indians were a Mountain State League minor league baseball team based in Logan, West Virginia United States that played from 1937 to 1942. It was a Class-D team for its first five years, though in its final season it became a Class-C squad. In 1939, it was affiliated with the Cleveland Indians.

Managed by Ed Hock from 1938 to 1941, the team appeared in the league finals three times during that span, winning the championship in 1941.

Pitcher Steve Gromek, who won 123 major league games in 17 seasons and who was an All-Star in 1945, is perhaps the most notable individual to play for the team. He spent 1939 with the squad as a second baseman.

== Notable Logan alumni ==
- Steve Gromek (1939) MLB All-Star
- Grover Hartley (1942)
- Dixie Howell (1937)
- Ray Ryan (1942, MGR)
