= Walter Sessi =

American baseball player (1918–1998)

- Outfielder
- Born: July 23, 1918; Finleyville, Pennsylvania, U.S.
- Died: April 18, 1998 (aged 79); Mobile, Alabama, U.S.
- Batted: Left Threw: Left

MLB debut
- September 18, 1941, for the St. Louis Cardinals

Last MLB appearance
- September 27, 1946, for the St. Louis Cardinals

MLB statistics
- Batting average: .074
- Home runs: 1
- Runs batted in: 2
- Stats at Baseball Reference

Teams
- St. Louis Cardinals (1941, 1946)

Walter Anthony Sessi (July 23, 1918 – April 18, 1998), nicknamed "Watsie", was an American Major League Baseball outfielder and pinch hitter who appeared in 20 total MLB games for the St. Louis Cardinals in 1941 and 1946. The native of Finleyville, Pennsylvania, threw and batted left-handed, stood 6 feet 3 inches (1.91 m) tall and weighed 225 pounds (102 kg).

Sessi's professional baseball career began in 1937 in the minor leagues and was interrupted by his four years of service (1942–1945) in the United States Army during World War II. During his 14-season minor league career, which ended in 1955, he was known as a power hitter, blasting more than 20 home runs six times, capped by a 45-homer season in 1952 in the Class B Gulf States League.

As a big-leaguer, Sessi compiled two hits and two bases on balls in 29 plate appearances. One of his hits was a ninth-inning, walk-off home run on August 28, 1946, against the New York Giants' Bill Voiselle at Sportsman's Park, which carried the Cardinals to a 3–2 victory. Every win was important for the 1946 Redbirds, who would finish the regular season in a tie with the Brooklyn Dodgers for the pennant, sweep the 1946 National League tie-breaker series, and defeat the Boston Red Sox for the world championship.
