= Beckley Bengals =

- 1931–1938; (1931-1935, 1937-1938); Beckley, West Virginia

Minor league affiliations
- Previous classes: Class-D (1937-1938); Class-C (1931-1935)
- League: Mountain State League (1937-1938)
- Previous leagues: Middle Atlantic League (1931-1935)

Major league affiliations
- Previous teams: Detroit Tigers (1937); Cincinnati Reds (1934)

Minor league titles
- League titles: 1937, 1938

Team data
- Previous names: Beckley Bengals (1937-1938); Beckley Miners (1935); Beckley Black Knights (1931-1934)

The Beckley Bengals were a Mountain State League baseball team based in Beckley, West Virginia, United States that existed from 1937 to 1938. They played under manager Eli Harris and won the league championship both seasons. They were affiliated with the Detroit Tigers in 1937.

Previously the Beckley Black Knights (later Beckley Miners) played in the Middle Atlantic League from 1931 to 1935.

== Notable Beckley alumni ==
- Max Butcher (1932)
- Lou Chiozza (1932)
- Johnny Gorsica (1938)
- Lee Grissom (1934) MLB All-Star
- Frank McCormick 9 x MLB All-Star; 1940 NL Most Valuable Player
- Jimmy Outlaw (1940)
- Frank Welch (1931)
- Del Young (1933)
- Murray Franklin (1938)
- Eugene Rex "Gene" Strother (1935)
