= Ray French (baseball) =

American baseball player (1895–1978)

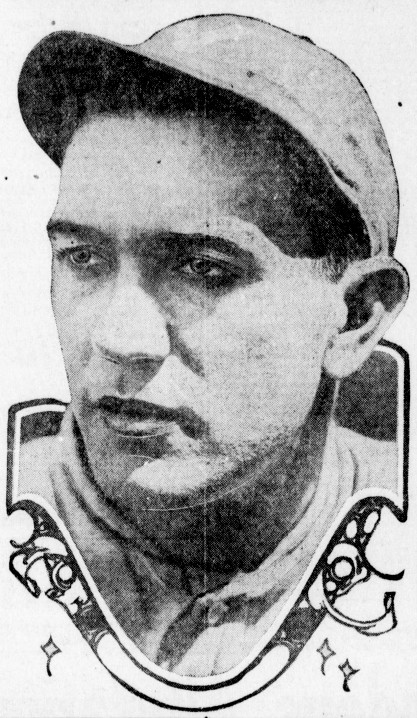
- Shortstop
- Born: January 9, 1895; Alameda, California, U.S.
- Died: April 3, 1978 (aged 83); Alameda, California, U.S.
- Batted: Right Threw: Right

MLB debut
- September 17, 1920, for the New York Yankees

Last MLB appearance
- July 10, 1924, for the Chicago White Sox

MLB statistics
- Batting average: .193
- Home runs: 0
- Runs batted in: 19
- Stats at Baseball Reference

Teams
- New York Yankees (1920); Brooklyn Robins (1923); Chicago White Sox (1924)

Raymond Edward French (January 9, 1895 – April 3, 1978), was an American professional baseball player who played shortstop from 1920 to 1924.

He was later a manager in Minor League Baseball from 1939 to 1941 and an umpire from 1946 to 1950.

He was born in Alameda, California and died there are well. He was buried in Hayward, California.
