= Welch Miners =

- 1937–1955; (1937–1942, 1946–1955); Welch, West Virginia

Minor league affiliations
- Class: Class D
- League: Appalachian League (1946–1955); Mountain State League (1937–1942)

Major league affiliations
- Team: Philadelphia Athletics (1953–1955); Boston Braves (1952); Cincinnati Reds (1951); Philadelphia Athletics (1947–1950); Boston Braves (1942)

Minor league titles
- League titles (2): 1952; 1953

Team data
- Name: Welch Miners (1937–1942, 1946–1955)
- Ballpark: Blakely Field

The Welch Miners were a Minor League Baseball team based in Welch, West Virginia. The team operated from 1937 through 1942 in the Mountain State League and in the Appalachian League from 1946 to 1955.

Over the course of nineteen seasons, the Welch Miners were affiliated with the Boston Braves (1942, 1952), Philadelphia Athletics (1947–1950, 1953–1955), and Cincinnati Reds (1951).

The team won consecutive league titles in 1952 and 1953, and moved to Marion, Virginia, during the 1955 season, changing their name to the Marion Athletics.

== Notable alumni ==
- Vern Bickford (1939–1942) MLB All-Star
- Dave Bristol (1951)
- Max Butcher (1946)
- Sam Gray (1939)

== Team history ==
Year	Record	Finish	Manager(s)	Playoffs
1937	59–43	2nd	Eddie Krajnik	Lost in 2nd round
1938	56–64	4th	Eddie Krajnik; Charles Bowie; Carlos Ratliff	Lost in 1st round
1939	72–57	2nd	Sam Gray	Lost in 1st round
1940	63–62	4th	Tex Stuart; Roy Hall	Lost in 1st round
1941	64–62	4th	Fred Neisler	Lost in league finals
1942	67–55	2nd	Don Manno	Lost in 1st round
1946	33–84	8th	Steve Secik; George Smiley; Jim McNeish; Joe Santomauro	
1947	49–74	8th	Walter Youse; Joe Bird	
1948	70–53	2nd	Woody Wheaton	Lost in 1st round
1949	48–73	6th	William Hoffner; Mike Kreshka	
1950	46–76	6th	Eddie Morgan; Woody Wheaton	
1951	54–74	6th	Mike Blazo	
1952	59–57	3rd	Jack Crosswhite	League Champs
1953	82–43	2nd	Jack Crosswhite	League Champs
1954	59–54	4th	Jack Crosswhite	Lost in 1st round
1955	45–77	8th	Herb Mancini	

== Sources ==
- BR - Appalachian League
- BR - Mountain State League
