= Omar López (baseball) =

Venezuelan baseball coach (born 1977)

Houston Astros – No. 22
- Coach
- Born: January 3, 1977 (age 49); Valencia, Carabobo, Venezuela

Teams
- Houston Astros (2020–present)

Career highlights and awards
- World Series champion (2022)

Member of the Venezuelan

Baseball Hall of Fame
- Induction: 2026 (as part of 2026 WBC team)
Medals
Men's baseball
Manager for Venezuela
World Baseball Classic
Gold medal – first place	2026 Miami	Team

Omar E. López (born January 3, 1977) is a Venezuelan professional baseball coach and former player, scout, and manager in Minor League Baseball (MiLB). He most recently served as the bench coach for the Houston Astros of Major League Baseball (MLB), also having worked within the organization since 1999.

López has also managed the Venezuelan national team at the 2023 World Baseball Classic, the 2024 WBSC Premier12 and the 2026 World Baseball Classic; at the 2026 WBC, he led Venezuela to the gold medal, its first international baseball championship in 80 years.

== Baseball career ==
López played shortstop and third base in Minor League Baseball for the Chicago White Sox organization in 1996 and 1997 and for the Arizona Diamondbacks organization in 1998. He then joined the Houston Astros organization in 1999 as a scout and hitting and infield instructor in Venezuela and worked in that capacity until 2007. He recommended that the team sign Jose Altuve when the future MVP was a 16-year-old.

From 2008 to 2019, López managed in the minors for several Astros' affiliates. As manager of the Gulf Coast League Astros in 2010, he was named the Astros' Player Development Man of the Year. In 2013, he led the High-A Quad Cities River Bandits to an 81–57 (.587) record and the Midwest League championship.

During the 2014–15 season in the winter league Venezuelan Professional Baseball League (LVBP), López managed the Caribes de Anzoátegui, and, at age 38, was the youngest manager in the league. He led the Caribes to the league championship and earned the Manager of the Year Award.

In his most recent minor league managerial post, López helmed the Double-A Corpus Christi Hooks in 2018 and 2019. In 2018, he led the Hooks to an 82–56 (.594) record, a postseason qualification, and earned Texas League Manager of the Year honors.

The Astros promoted him to their major league first base coach before the 2020 season. In 2022, the Astros won 106 regular season games, the second-most in franchise history. They won the World Series, defeating the Philadelphia Phillies in six games, earning López his first World Series title.

López was named manager of the Venezuela national team for the 2023 World Baseball Classic (WBC) tournament on August 17, 2022. In the WBC, López won his debut as Venezuela's manager in a 5–1 victory over the Dominican Republic. Venezuela won Pool D with a 4–0 record but were eliminated from the tournament by the United States in the quarterfinals, 9–7.

On December 1, 2023, the Astros named López bench coach.

In 2026, López returned to manage the national team in the World Baseball Classic, leading the squad to its first-ever final and subsequently to its first title in the tournament’s history. Venezuela defeated the United States 3–2 in the final held in Miami on March 17, 2026, marking one of the greatest achievements in Venezuelan baseball.

On October 14, 2026, the Astros announced that they would no longer retain López as bench coach but offered him the opportunity to remain with the organization in a different capacity, among a number of changes with the coaching staff.

Sporting positions
Preceded by Ed Romero	Greeneville Astros manager 2011–2012	Succeeded by Josh Bonifay
Preceded by Luis Aguayo; Josh Bonifay	Quad Cities River Bandits manager 2013–2014; 2016	Succeeded by Josh Bonifay; Russ Steinhorn
Preceded by Rodney Linares	Lancaster JetHawks manager 2015	Succeeded by Ramón Vázquez
Preceded by Franchise established	Buies Creek Astros manager 2017	Succeeded by Morgan Ensberg
Preceded by Rodney Linares	Corpus Christi Hooks manager 2018–2019	Succeeded by Gregorio Petit
Preceded by Don Kelly	Houston Astros first base coach 2020—2023	Succeeded by Dave Clark
Preceded by Joe Espada	Houston Astros bench coach 2024—2026	Succeeded by TBA
