= Greeneville Flyboys =

- Logo

Information
- League: Appalachian League
- Location: Greeneville, Tennessee
- Ballpark: Pioneer Park
- Founded: 2021
- League championships: 1 (2021)
- Division championships: 2 (2021), (2024)
- Colors: Navy, red, white
- Ownership: Boyd Sports, LLC
- General manager: Brandon Bouschart
- Website: Official website

The Greeneville Flyboys are a summer collegiate baseball team of the Appalachian League. They are located in Greeneville, Tennessee, and play their home games at Pioneer Park.

== History ==
=== Previous Greeneville teams ===
Professional baseball was first played in Greeneville, Tennessee, by the Greeneville Burley Cubs in the Appalachian League in 1921. They remained in the league through 1925 and returned for a second stretch from 1938 to 1942. The Burley Cubs were followed in the same league by the Greeneville Astros, who played in the city from 2004 to 2017. The Houston Astros, parent club of Greeneville, withdrew their affiliate from the Appalachian League after the 2017 season. The circuit's vacancy was filled by the Cincinnati Reds, who placed a Rookie-level affiliate in Greeneville known as the Greeneville Reds.

=== Collegiate summer team ===
In conjunction with a contraction of Minor League Baseball beginning with the 2021 season, the Appalachian League was reorganized as a collegiate summer baseball league, and the Greeneville Reds were replaced by a new franchise in the revamped league designed for rising college freshmen and sophomores. The new team became known as the Greeneville Flyboys. The nickname is in reference to an old airfield at the site of the stadium where the city's previous baseball teams played. The Flyboys play their home games at Pioneer Park on the campus of Tusculum University.
