= Rodney Linares =

Dominican-American baseball coach (born 1977)

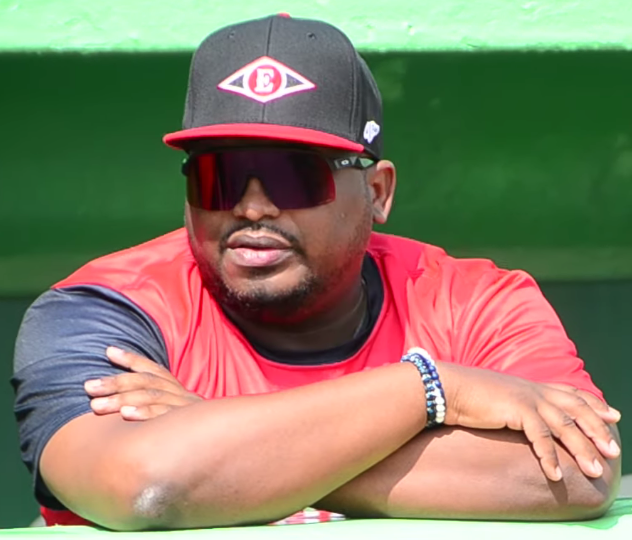
- Linares with Leones del Escogido in 2021

Tampa Bay Rays – No. 27
- Coach
- Born: August 7, 1977 (age 49); Brooklyn, New York, U.S.
- Bats: Right Throws: Right
- Stats at Baseball Reference

Teams
- Tampa Bay Rays (2019–present)

Rodney Linares (born August 7, 1977) is a Dominican–American coach for the Tampa Bay Rays of Major League Baseball. He managed the Dominican national team at the 2023 World Baseball Classic.

Linares played as an infielder at the Rookie-level of minor league baseball in 1997 and 1998. Born in Brooklyn, New York, he threw and batted right-handed, stood 5 feet 11 inches (1.80 m) tall and 180 pounds (82 kg).

== Career ==
He became a coach and instructor for the Houston Astros at the age of 21 in 1999, and spent two decades in the Astro organization as a batting coach and minor league manager. He is the son of Dominican baseball player Julio Linares, a member of the Houston organization since 1973 as a coach, manager, special assignments scout and key official for the club's operations in the Dominican Republic. Julio also spent three years (1994–96) as a coach for the MLB Astros.

After becoming a manager in the Astro organization in 2007, Rodney Linares oversaw the development of such players as Jose Altuve, Alex Bregman, Carlos Correa, J. D. Martinez and George Springer. In 2018, he managed the Triple-A Fresno Grizzlies to an 82–57, first-place finish in the Pacific Coast League's Pacific Northern Division; he led the Grizzlies into the second round of the PCL playoffs, where they fell to the Memphis Redbirds. Between 2012 and 2016, his teams qualified for the playoffs in five straight seasons, and Linares won the Class A-Advanced California League's Manager of the Year Award in 2013 and the Double-A Texas League's Manager of the Year Award in 2015. His minor-league managerial record over 12 seasons (2007–18) is 762–697 (.522); he has also helmed clubs in the Arizona Fall League and the Dominican Winter League. He makes his winter home in San Pedro de Macorís.

The Rays hired Linares as their third base coach in November 2018. In November 2022, he was promoted to bench coach after incumbent Matt Quatraro was hired as the manager of the Kansas City Royals.

Sporting positions
Preceded by Keith Bodie	Corpus Christi Hooks manager 2015–2017	Succeeded by Omar Lopéz
Preceded by Tony DeFrancesco	Fresno Grizzlies manager 2018	Succeeded by Randy Knorr
Preceded by Matt Quatraro	Tampa Bay Rays third base coach 2019–2022	Succeeded by Brady Williams
Preceded by Matt Quatraro	Tampa Bay Rays bench coach 2023–present	Succeeded by Incumbent
