= Enyelbert Soto =

Venezuelan baseball player (born 1982)

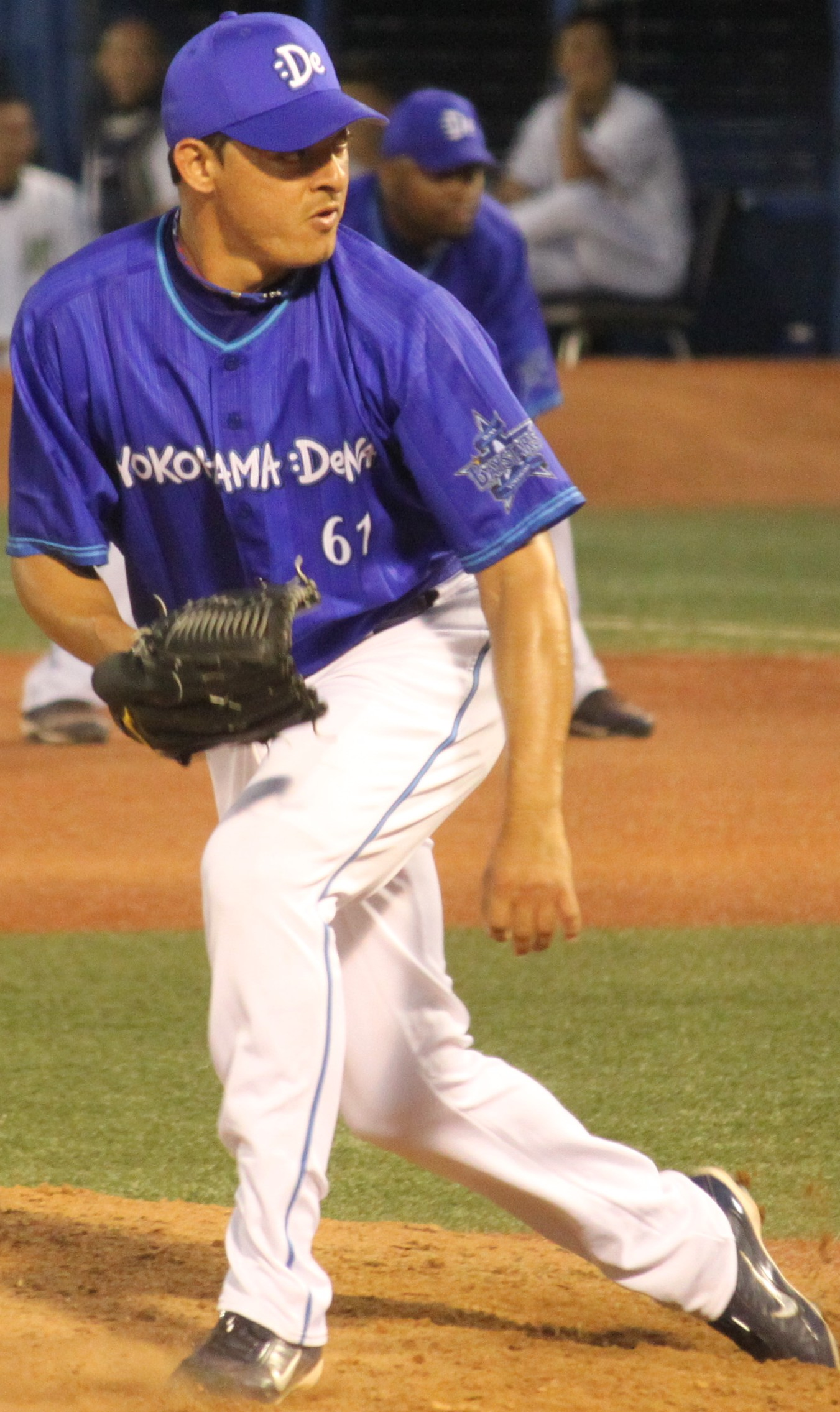
- Pitcher
- Born: August 20, 1982 (age 43); Maracaibo, Venezuela
- Batted: Left Threw: Left

NPB debut
- May 28, 2011, for the Chunichi Dragons

Last NPB appearance
- October 7, 2014, for the Yokohama DeNA BayStars

NPB statistics
- Win–loss record: 11–6
- ERA: 3.11
- Strikeouts: 139
- Stats at Baseball Reference

Teams
- Chunichi Dragons (2011–2012); Yokohama DeNA BayStars (2013–2014)

Enyelbert Soto (born August 20, 1982) is a Venezuelan former professional baseball pitcher. He played in Nippon Professional Baseball (NPB) for the Chunichi Dragons and Yokohama DeNA BayStars from 2011 to 2014.

== Playing career ==
=== Houston Astros ===
Soto signed with the Houston Astros as an international free agent in 2004. He split his first professional season between the rookie-level Greeneville Astros and Low-A Tri-City ValleyCats. Soto split the 2005 season between Tri-City and the Single-A Lexington Legends, posting a cumulative 2-2 record and 4.21 ERA with 28 strikeouts and two saves over 25 appearances out of the bullpen.

In 2006, Soto made 44 relief appearances for the High-A Salem Avalanche, compiling a 2-3 record and 1.75 ERA with 43 strikeouts across 56 2/3 innings pitched. He split the 2007 campaign between Salem and the Double-A Corpus Christi Hooks. In 28 appearances for the two affiliates, Soto pitched to a combined 4-2 record and 4.20 ERA with 33 strikeouts over 45 innings of work.

=== Chunichi Dragons ===
On January 24, 2011, Soto signed with the Chunichi Dragons of Nippon Professional Baseball. He made 22 appearances (11 starts) for Chunichi, posting a 5-1 record and 1.73 ERA with 59 strikeouts over 78 innings of work.

Soto made 18 appearances (nine starts) for the Dragons in 2012, compiling a 4-1 record and 2.17 ERA with 48 strikeouts across 62 1/3 innings pitched.

=== Yokohama DeNA BayStars ===
Soto signed with the Yokohama DeNA BayStars of Nippon Professional Baseball prior to the 2013 season. In eight appearances (seven starts) for the team, he struggled to a 1-3 record and 9.68 ERA with 22 strikeouts across 30 2/3 innings pitched.

Soto made 26 appearances out of the bullpen for the BayStars in 2014, registering a 1-1 record and 1.57 ERA with 10 strikeouts and one save over 23 innings of work.

=== Gunma Diamond Pegasus ===
Soto also played Japan's Baseball Challenge League in 2015 and 2016 for the Gunma Diamond Pegasus.

== Coaching career ==
In 2023, Soto joined Corner Brook Baseball Academy on a three-year contract to serve as a coach.
