= Pioneer Park (stadium) =

Stadium in Greeneville, Tennessee

- Interactive map of Pioneer Park
- Address: 135 Shiloh Road; Greeneville, Tennessee; United States
- Coordinates: 36.173149°N 82.756115°W
- Capacity: 2,555
- Field size: Left Field: 331 ft (101 m); Left-Center Field: 375 ft (114 m); Center Field: 400 ft (120 m); Right-Center Field: 375 ft (114 m); Right Field: 331 ft (101 m)
- Surface: Grass

Tenants
- Tusculum Pioneers (NCAA) (2004–present); Greeneville Astros (AL) (2004–2017); Greeneville Reds (AL) (2018–2020); Greeneville Flyboys (AL) (2021–present)

Website
- Pioneer Park

Pioneer Park is a stadium on the campus of Tusculum University in Tusculum, Tennessee. It is primarily used for baseball as the home field for the college's baseball team, the Tusculum Pioneers. It was built in 2004, and holds 4,000 people. It is also home to the Greeneville Flyboys of the summer collegiate Appalachian League. It was previously home to the Greeneville Reds Minor League Baseball team of the then-Rookie Appalachian League from 2018 to 2020 and the Greeneville Astros from 2004 to 2017.
