= Cam Bonifay =

American baseball executive and scout (born 1952)

- Born: Cameron Hubert Bonifay; February 12, 1952 (age 74); St. Petersburg, Florida, U.S.
- Occupation: Baseball executive

Cameron Hubert Bonifay (born February 12, 1952) is an American former Major League Baseball executive and scout, best known as general manager of the Pittsburgh Pirates from 1993 to 2001.

== Career ==
Bonifay's father was a minor league general manager for several teams in the farm systems of the Detroit Tigers and Cincinnati Reds. His own career in sports began as a football placekicker and third baseman at Georgia Tech in the early 1970s. While at Georgia Tech, Bonifay set and tied many records in football as well as baseball as well as being named an All-American Honorable Mention in baseball. Bonifay was not drafted but signed on as an undrafted free agent with the St. Louis Cardinals and played two years of Minor League Baseball. Bonifay stopped playing after he was plagued with knee problems.

Bonifay went back to Georgia Tech and became an assistant coach under Jim Morris beginning in 1985. In 1989, Bonifay was inducted into the Georgia Tech Sports Hall of Fame for his achievements in baseball. Bonifay is still the youngest person ever inducted into the Georgia Tech Sports Hall of Fame. In late 1987, Bonifay became a scout with the Cincinnati Reds starting his stint working in several major league baseball front offices.

In 1993, he became general manager of the Pittsburgh Pirates and in 1997, he was named general manager of the year. In 2000, Bonifay signed catcher Jason Kendall to a 6-year $60 million contract, a move that would have severe financial ramifications on the Pirates in later years. He was also heavily criticized for the two-year, $10-million contract given to Derek Bell in 2001.

Bonifay was responsible for a few good trades such as trading Ricardo Rincon for Brian Giles before the 1999 season. During his tenure as GM with the Pirates, Bonifay never compiled a winning season, however in 1997 the team remained competitive until the final week of the season and finished in 2nd place with a 79–83 record on just a $9 million payroll. At the beginning of the 1997 season, most analysts picked the Pirates to finish last with over 100 losses.

After he was fired in 2001 by Pirates owner Kevin McClatchy, Bonifay signed with the Tampa Bay Devil Rays as their director of player development and scouting. He was released from that position in the offseason of 2005 when the Rays were sold into new ownership. Bonifay signed on with the St. Louis Cardinals as a pro scout for two years starting in the 2007 season. In November of 2008, Bonifay joined the Cincinnati Reds as a special assistant to the general manager. In December of 2023, he became senior advisor to the president.

His sons Jonathan and Josh both played baseball in college. Jonathan played for Wake Forest and Josh played for UNC Wilmington. Josh played seven years in Minor League Baseball for the Pittsburgh Pirates and the Houston Astros. Josh was a hitting coach for the Texas Rangers major league system in 2017. In October 2018, the Philadelphia Phillies hired Josh to become their director of player development.
