= Brady Williams =

American professional baseball manager (born 1979)

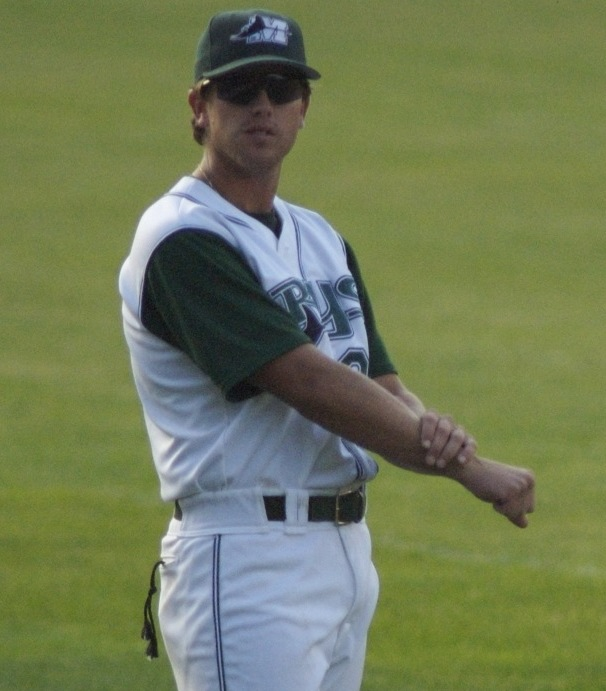
- Williams with the Southwest Michigan Devil Rays in 2006

Tampa Bay Rays – No. 4
- Coach
- Born: October 18, 1979 (age 47); Salt Lake City, Utah, U.S.
- Bats: Right Throws: Right
- Stats at Baseball Reference

Teams
- As coach: Tampa Bay Rays (2023–present)

Brady Charles Williams (born October 18, 1979) is an American professional baseball coach who is the third base coach for the Tampa Bay Rays of Major League Baseball (MLB).

== Life and career ==
Born in Salt Lake City, Utah, he is the son of the late Jimy Williams, who was a Major League infielder, coach and manager.

Brady Williams, an infielder himself, was selected by the Boston Red Sox in the 45th round of the 1999 Major League Baseball draft out of Pasco-Hernando Community College. That season, his father was in the process of managing the Red Sox to a wild card berth in the 1999 American League pennant race. Brady Williams appeared in 264 minor league and 316 independent league games over the course of a seven-year (1999–2005) professional career, batting .233 with 441 hits and 58 home runs. He reached the Double-A level for eight games in 2002 as a member of the New Britain Rock Cats. During his active career, the 6 ft 1 in (1.85 m), 185 lb (84 kg) Williams batted and threw right-handed.

In 2006, Williams became a coach in the Tampa Bay Devil Rays organization at the Class A level, and has been a manager with the Short Season-A Hudson Valley Renegades (2009), Class A Bowling Green Hot Rods (2010–12), and Class A Charlotte Stone Crabs (2013). He was named the Midwest League's top managerial prospect of 2012 by Baseball America, and through 2018 had compiled a win–loss record of 695–627 (.526). From 2014–2018, he spent five years as skipper of the Montgomery Biscuits, the Rays' Double-A affiliate. In his second year in Montgomery, Williams led his club to the second-half North Division championship and the Southern League playoffs. He also led the 2016 and 2017 Biscuits to playoff berths. On January 18, 2019, Williams was named the manager of the Durham Bulls. In three full seasons at Durham (interrupted by the 2020 minor-league shutdown due to the COVID-19 pandemic), Williams posted a 247–172 (.589) record, including winning Triple-A national championships in 2021 and 2022, and finishing runner-up in the 2019 Governors' Cup playoffs.

On November 14, 2022, Williams was officially announced as the Rays' new third base coach, replacing Rodney Linares.

Brady Williams' younger brother Shawn is a minor league manager and former player; he has been a skipper in the Philadelphia Phillies' farm system since 2014.

Preceded by Billy Gardner Jr.	Montgomery Biscuits manager 2014–2018	Succeeded by Morgan Ensberg
Preceded by Jared Sandberg	Durham Bulls manager 2019–2022	Succeeded by Michael Johns
