= Travis Dawkins =

American baseball player & coach (born 1979)

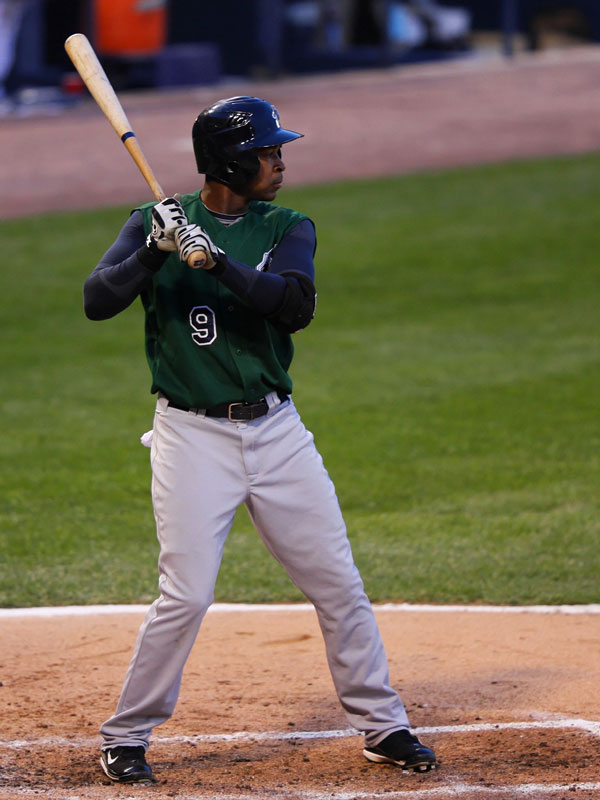
- Dawkins with the Dayton Dragons in 2009
- Shortstop / Coach
- Born: May 12, 1979 (age 46); Newberry, South Carolina, U.S.
- Batted: Right Threw: Right

MLB debut
- September 3, 1999, for the Cincinnati Reds

Last MLB appearance
- July 23, 2003, for the Kansas City Royals

MLB statistics
- Batting average: .163
- Runs scored: 8
- Hits: 16
- Stats at Baseball Reference

Teams
- Cincinnati Reds (1999–2000, 2002); Kansas City Royals (2003)
Medals
Men's baseball
Representing United States
Olympic Games
Gold medal – first place	2000 Sydney	Team
Pan American Games
Silver medal – second place	1999 Winnipeg	Team

Travis Sentell "Gookie" Dawkins (born May 12, 1979) is an American former professional baseball shortstop and current coach. He played in Major League Baseball (MLB) for the Cincinnati Reds and Kansas City Royals.

== Career ==
Drafted by the Cincinnati Reds in the 2nd round of the 1997 Major League Baseball draft, Dawkins would make his Major League Baseball debut with the Reds on September 3, 1999. His first major league at-bat was on September 4, 1999, at Philadelphia (a game in which the Reds hit nine home runs). Dawkins singled and reached third base on a throwing error. A young Philadelphia Phillies fan seated down the first base line reached over the fence and grabbed the rolling ball during play. The Reds staff later obtained the first major league hit ball for Dawkins by trading with the fan.

Dawkins won an Olympic gold medal in 2000 while playing for the United States baseball team.

Dawkins spent the 2007 season playing for the Tacoma Rainiers, the Triple-A affiliate of the Seattle Mariners, and the Ottawa Lynx, the Triple-A affiliate of the Philadelphia Phillies. Dawkins was re-signed by the Phillies on December 7, 2007, to a minor league contract.

Dawkins signed with the Chicago White Sox for the 2008 season, and was assigned to their Triple-A team, the Charlotte Knights. Dawkins was traded to the Kansas City Royals on June 11, 2008. He re-signed with the White Sox after the season. He then signed the Reds in the summer of 2010.

In the 2010 offseason, Dawkins signed a minor league contract with the Charlotte Knights.

Dawkins began his professional coaching career in 2015, where he served as the hitting coach for the Arizona League Reds in Goodyear, Arizona. In 2016, he was named hitting coach for the Cincinnati Reds' Advanced-A Affiliate, the Daytona Tortugas. In 2017, he was promoted to hitting coach of the Reds' Double-A Affiliate, Pensacola Blue Wahoos. In 2018, he was promoted to manager of the Reds' Rookie-level Affiliate Greeneville Reds. In 2020, he was promoted to manager of the Reds' Single-A Affiliate Dayton Dragons.
