= Greeneville Reds =

- 2018–2020; Greeneville, Tennessee
Team logo
Cap insignia

Minor league affiliations
- Class: Rookie (2018–2020)
- League: Appalachian League (2018–2020)

Major league affiliations
- Team: Cincinnati Reds (2018–2020)

Minor league titles
- League titles (0): None

Team data
- Name: Greeneville Reds (2018–2020)
- Colors: Red, black, white
- Ballpark: Pioneer Park (2018–2020)

The Greeneville Reds were a Minor League Baseball team of the Rookie-level Appalachian League. They represented the town of Greeneville, Tennessee, though Pioneer Park, their home stadium, was located in the nearby city of Tusculum on the campus of Tusculum College. They were an affiliate of the Cincinnati Reds. The Greeneville Reds replaced the Greeneville Astros (2004–2017) as the city's entry in the league.

== History ==
Professional baseball was first played in Greeneville, Tennessee, by the Greeneville Burley Cubs in the Appalachian League in 1921. They remained in the league through 1925 and returned for a second stretch from 1938 to 1942. The Burley Cubs were followed in the same league by the Greeneville Astros, who played in the city from 2004 to 2017. The Houston Astros, parent club of Greeneville, withdrew their affiliate from the Appalachian League after the 2017 season. The circuit's vacancy was filled by the Cincinnati Reds, who placed a Rookie-level affiliate in Greeneville known as the Greeneville Reds.

The Reds played their inaugural game on June 19, 2018, against the Bristol Pirates at Pioneer Park. The 10–2 loss was attended by 2,388 fans. Their first win came two nights later when they defeated the Pirates, 13–12, before 813 in attendance. Led by manager Gookie Dawkins, Greeneville concluded their first season with a 28–40 record, placing fifth in the West Division, 15 games back. The Reds finished last again in 2019 after compiling a 26–41 season, 8 1/2 games out of first place.

The start of the 2020 season was postponed due to the COVID-19 pandemic before ultimately being cancelled on June 30. In conjunction with a contraction of Minor League Baseball beginning with the 2021 season, the Appalachian League was reorganized as a collegiate summer baseball league, and the Reds were replaced by a new franchise in the revamped league designed for rising college freshmen and sophomores.

== Season-by-season results ==
Season	Regular season					Postseason			Ref.
Season	Record	Win %	League	Division	GB	Record	Win %	Result	Ref.
2018	28–40	.412	9th	5th	12	—	—	—	
2019	26–41	.388	10th	5th	8 1/2	—	—	—	
2020	Season cancelled (COVID-19 pandemic)								
Totals	54–81	.400	—	—	—	—	—	—	—

== Major league alumni ==
As of the completion of the 2020 season, one Greeneville Reds player had also played in at least one game for a Major League Baseball team. Blake Trahan played four games on a minor league rehab assignment with Greeneville in 2019.
