= Josh Bonifay =

American baseball executive (born 1978)

- Outfielder / Coach
- Born: July 30, 1978 (age 48); Macon, Georgia, U.S.
- Bats: Right Throws: Right
- Stats at Baseball Reference

Teams
- As coach: Texas Rangers (2017); As executive: Philadelphia Phillies (2019)

Joshua Cameron Bonifay (born July 30, 1978) is an American baseball executive and former professional baseball player and coach. He is the farm director for the Texas Rangers of Major League Baseball.

== Early life and playing career ==
Bonifay attended T. C. Roberson High School in Asheville, North Carolina. He attended the University of North Carolina at Wilmington (UNCW), where he played college baseball for the UNCW Seahawks. The Pittsburgh Pirates selected him in the 24th round of the 1999 Major League Baseball draft. He played Minor League Baseball for eight seasons. After he retired, Bonifay graduated from the UNCW's Cameron School of Business with honors.

== Post-playing career ==
Bonifay joined the Houston Astros' organization in 2011 as a hitting coach for the Greeneville Astros of the Rookie-level Appalachian League. He spent 2012 as the hitting coach for the Lexington Legends of the Class A South Atlantic League. He became the manager of Greeneville in 2013, and won the Appalachian League Manager of the Year Award that year. He managed the Quad Cities River Bandits of the Class A Midwest League in 2015. The Rangers hired Bonifay for their major league coaching staff during the 2016–2017 offseason. Bonifay was not brought back to the major league staff after the 2017 season. In October 2018, the Philadelphia Phillies hired Bonifay to become their director of player development.

On October 29, 2021, Bonifay was hired as the new farm director for the Texas Rangers.

== Personal life ==
Bonifay and his wife, Tiffany, had a daughter in 2014. They live in North Carolina. Josh Bonifay's father is retired baseball executive Cam Bonifay.
