= Greeneville Astros =

- 2004–2017; Greeneville, Tennessee
Team logo
Cap insignia

Minor league affiliations
- Class: Rookie (2004–2017)
- League: Appalachian League (2004–2017)

Major league affiliations
- Team: Houston Astros (2004–2017)

Minor league titles
- League titles (2): 2004; 2015
- Division titles (1): 2004

Team data
- Name: Greeneville Astros (2004–2017)
- Colors: Navy blue, orange, white
- Previous parks: Pioneer Park (2004–2017)

The Greeneville Astros were a Minor League Baseball team that played in the Rookie-level Appalachian League from 2004 to 2017. They represented the town of Greeneville, Tennessee, though Pioneer Park, their home stadium, was located in nearby Tusculum on the campus of Tusculum College. They were named for their Major League Baseball affiliate, the Houston Astros.

Over 14 years of competition, the Astros played in 938 regular season games and compiled a 440–498 win–loss record. They qualified for the postseason on four occasions and won the Appalachian League championship in 2004 and 2015. They had a postseason record of 9–8. Combining all 955 regular season and postseason games, the Astros had an all-time record of 449–506.

Among the players to come through Greeneville before playing in Major League Baseball are Jose Altuve, Carlos Correa, Mike Foltynewicz, and J. D. Martinez.

== History ==
Professional baseball was first played in Greeneville, Tennessee, by the Greeneville Burley Cubs in the Appalachian League in 1921. They remained in the league through 1925 and returned for a second stretch from 1938 to 1942. Prior to the 2004 season, the Houston Astros moved their Rookie Appalachian League affiliate from Martinsville, Virginia, where they were known as the Martinsville Astros, to Greeneville as the Greeneville Astros. While the team bore the name of Greeneville, they would play their home games at Pioneer Park located in nearby Tusculum on the campus of Tusculum College.

Managed by Tim Bogar, the Astros played their first game on June 21, 2004, on the road against the Elizabethton Twins at Joe O'Brien Field, winning 3–1. They completed their inaugural season with a first place 41–26 record, the all-time franchise highest. Having won the Western Division title, Greeneville then defeated the Danville Braves, 2–1, in a best-of-three series to win the Appalachian League championship. Bogar was selected for the league's Manager of the Year Award, and outfielder Mitch Einertson won Player of the Year honors.

The Astros missed the playoffs for the next eight seasons, often finishing fourth or fifth out of five teams in the Western Division. The 2007 team set a franchise record low win–loss record with a 17–51 season.

Led by Manager of the Year Josh Bonifay, the 2013 Astros earned a playoff spot with a 38–30 second place finish. They won their semifinal match-up versus the Kingsport Mets, 2–1, but lost in the finals to the Pulaski Mariners, 2–0. Another second place finish at 34–33 under Lamarr Rogers in 2015 brought Greenville back to the postseason. They defeated Kingsport in the semifinals, 2–1, then won their second Appalachian League championship with a 2–1 series win over the Princeton Rays. In 2017, the Astros again finished second (33–34) to earn a playoff spot under manager Danny Ortega. They were, however, eliminated by the Elizabethton Twins, 2–1, in the semifinals with a 6–0 shutout road loss on September 6.

The Houston Astros announced two days later that they were eliminating their Appalachian League team in Greeneville so as to strengthen their player development efforts by reducing their farm system from nine teams to eight. Over 14 years in Greenville, the Astros led the Appalachian League in total and average attendance at Pioneer Park from 2004 to 2014. Their all-time regular season record was 440–498 (.469).

In 2018, the Cincinnati Reds took Greeneville's place in the Appalachian League with the Greeneville Reds.

== Season-by-season results ==
Season	Regular season					Postseason			Ref.
Season	Record	Win %	League	Division	GB	Record	Win %	Result	Ref.
2004	41–26	.612	2nd	1st	—	2–1	.667	Result	Won Western Division title Won AL championship vs. Danville Braves, 2–1
2005	29–37	.439	7th	3rd	18 1/2	—	—	—	
2006	34–33	.507	4th (tie)	2nd (tie)	7 1/2	—	—	—	
2007	17–51	.250	10th	5th	33	—	—	—	
2008	30–36	.455	7th	5th	11	—	—	—	
2009	27–40	.403	9th	5th	17 1/2	—	—	—	
2010	31–35	.470	8th	4th	11	—	—	—	
2011	25–43	.368	8th	4th	20	—	—	—	
2012	36–32	.529	5th (tie)	3rd	8 1/2	—	—	—	
2013	38–30	.559	4th	2nd	2 1/2	2–3	.400	Won semifinals vs. Kingsport Mets, 2–1; Lost AL championship vs. Pulaski Mariners, 2–0	
2014	32–34	.485	7th (tie)	4th	5	—	—	—	
2015	34–33	.507	4th	2nd	5 1/2	4–2	.667	Won semifinals vs. Kingsport Mets, 2–1; Won AL championship vs. Princeton Rays, 2–1	
2016	33–34	.493	6th	3rd	5 1/2	—	—	—	
2017	33–34	.493	5th (tie)	2nd (tie)	7 1/2	1–2	.333	Lost semifinals vs. Elizabethton Twins, 2–1	
Totals	440–498	.469	—	—	—	9–8	.529	—	—

== Award winners and All-Stars ==
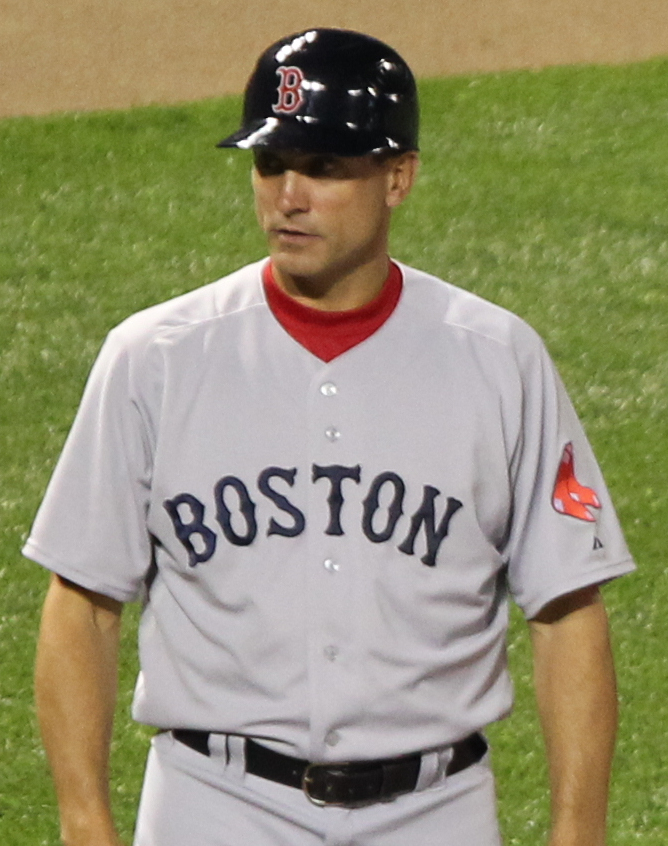
Tim Bogar won the 2004 Manager of the Year Award.

Appalachian League Award Winners
Award	Recipient	Season	Ref.
Player of the Year	Mitch Einertson	2004	Ref.
Manager of the Year	Tim Bogar	2004	
Manager of the Year	Josh Bonifay	2013	
Executive of the Year	Lynsi House	2004	
Executive of the Year	David Lane	2009	
Executive of the Year	David Lane	2010	

Appalachian League Postseason All-Stars
Season	Name	Position	Ref.
2004	Mitch Einertson	Outfielder	Ref.
2004	Enyelbert Soto	Relief Pitcher	
2005	Josh Flores	Utility outfielder	
2006	Ronald Ramirez	Utility infielder	
2006	Polin Trinidad	Left-handed pitcher	
2009	Jose Altuve	Second baseman	
2010	Marcus Nidiffer	First baseman	
2010	Chris Wallace	Designated hitter	
2011	Chase Davidson	First baseman	
2012	Jean Batista	Shortstop	
2012	Brian Blasik	Utility infielder	
2013	Josh Bonifay	Manager	
2015	Connor Goedert	Third baseman	

== Notable players ==
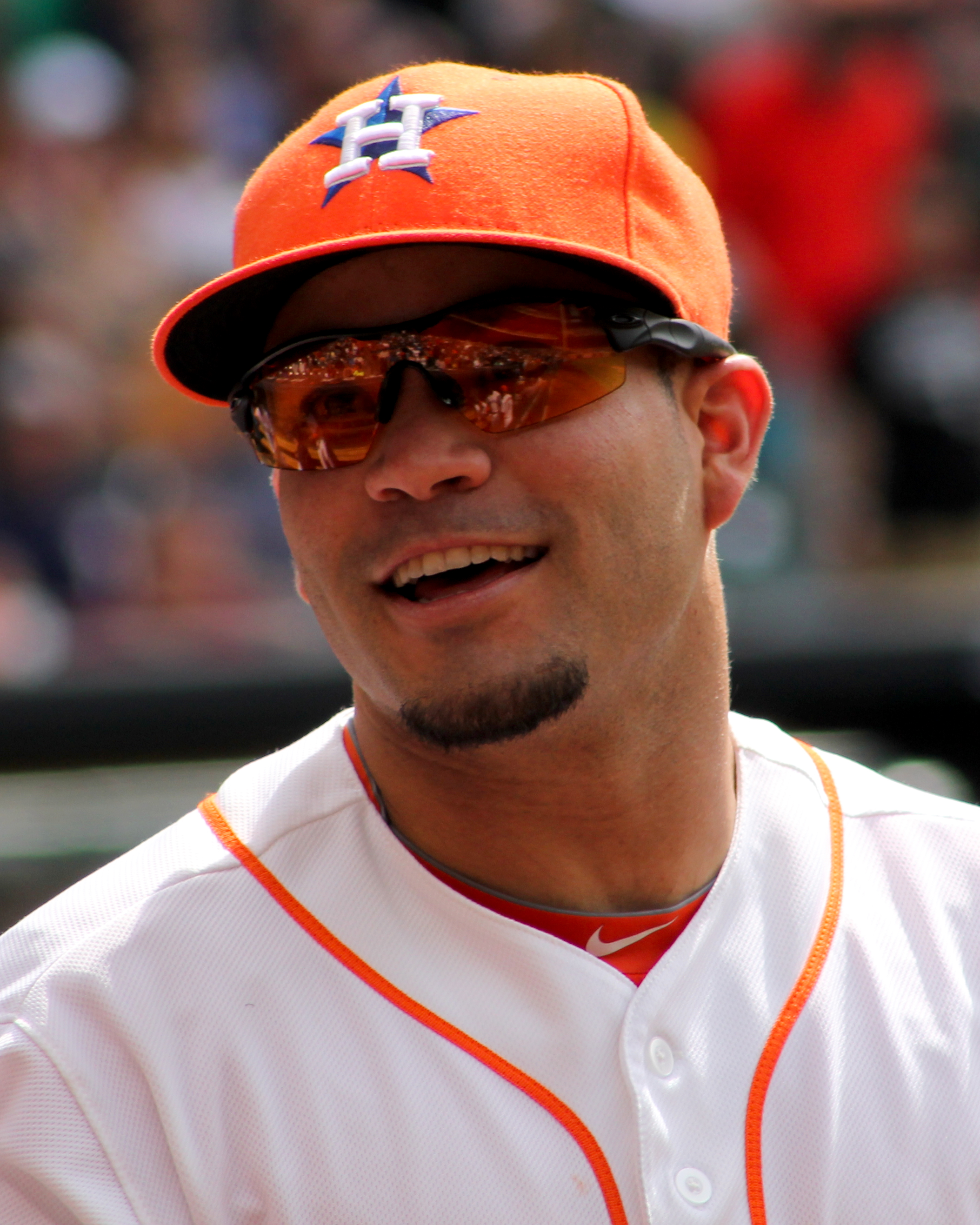
Jose Altuve (2008–2009) won the 2017 American League Most Valuable Player Award.

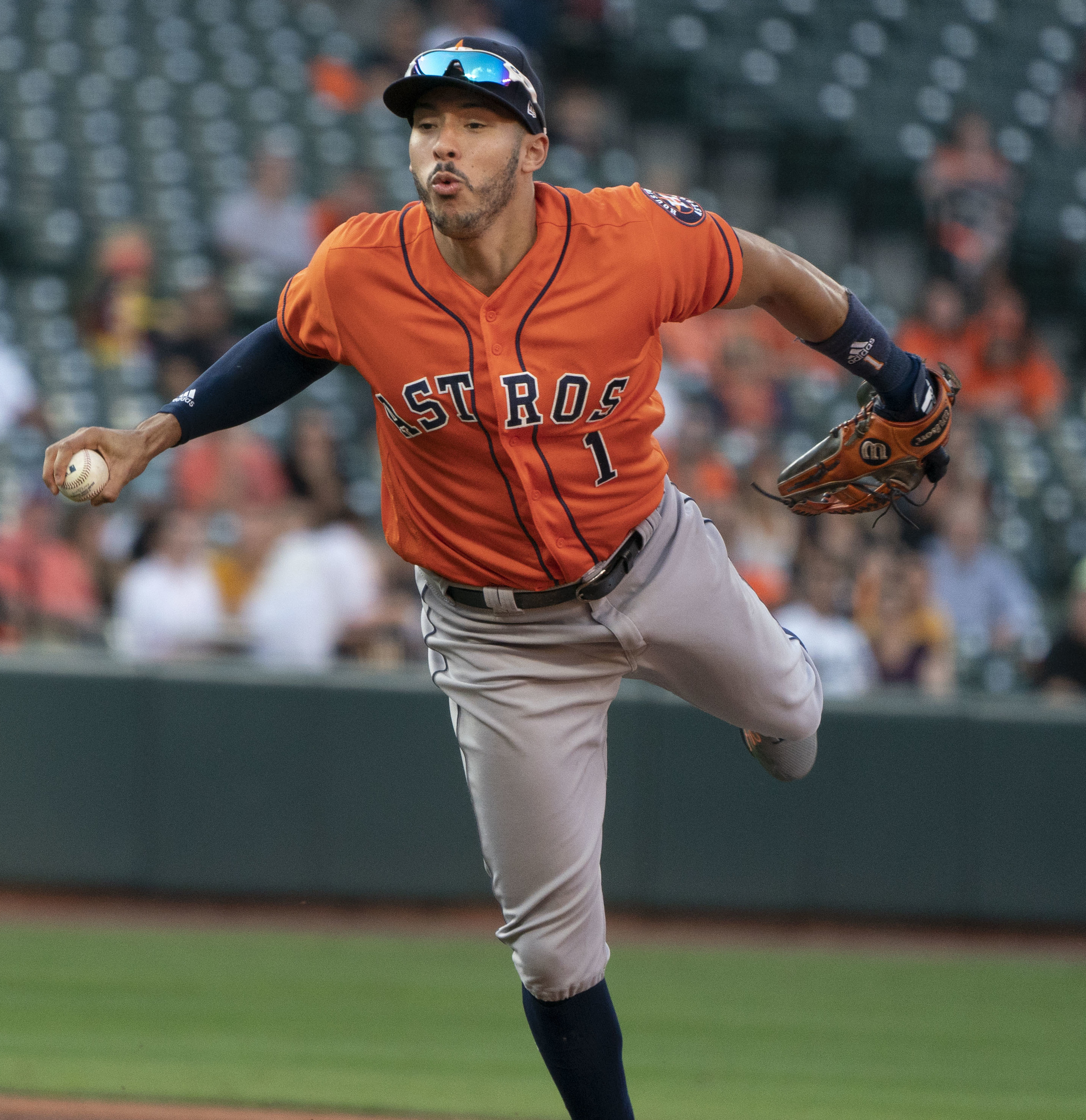
Carlos Correa (2012) won the 2015 American League Rookie of the Year Award.

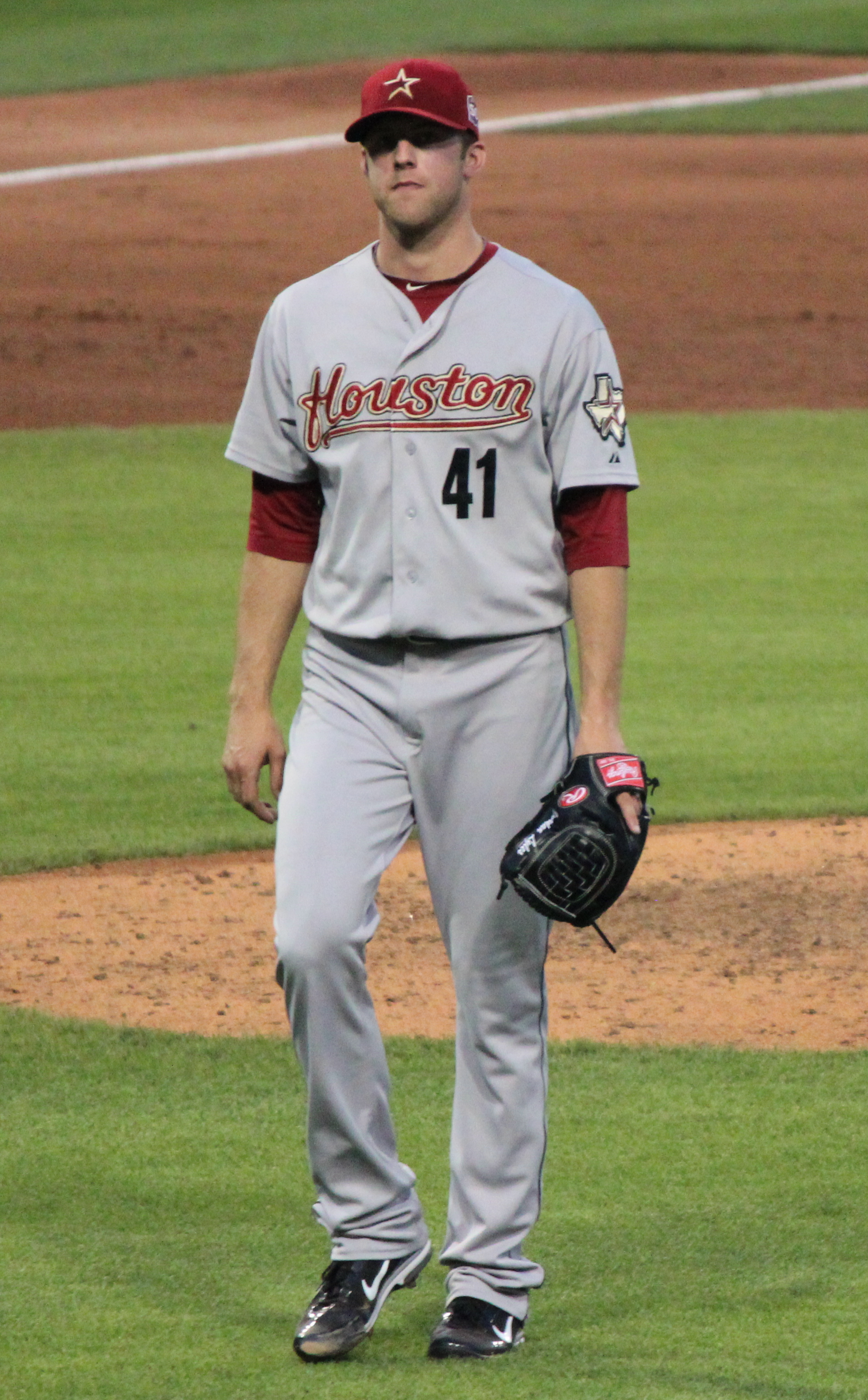
Jordan Lyles (2008)

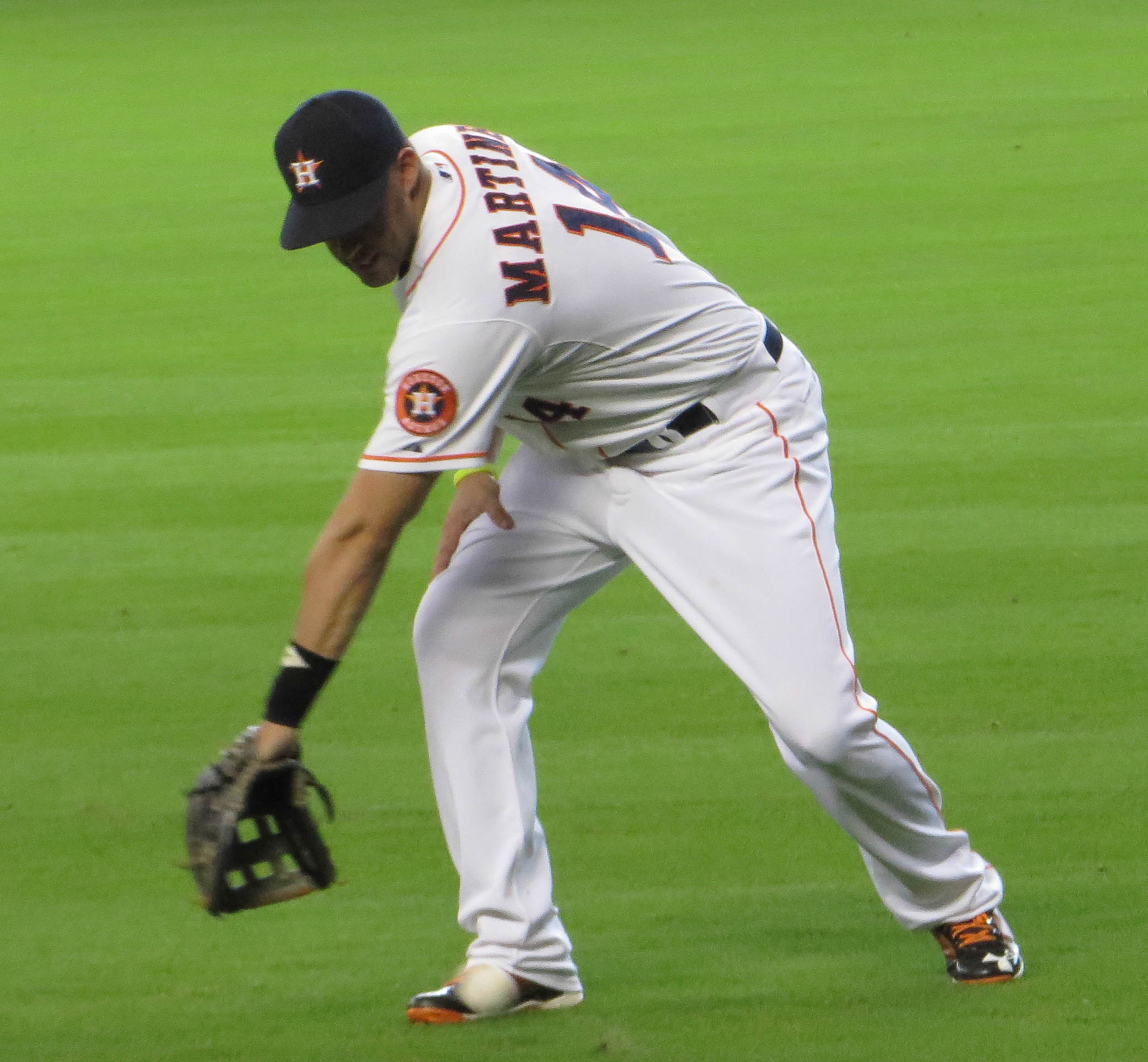
J. D. Martinez (2009)

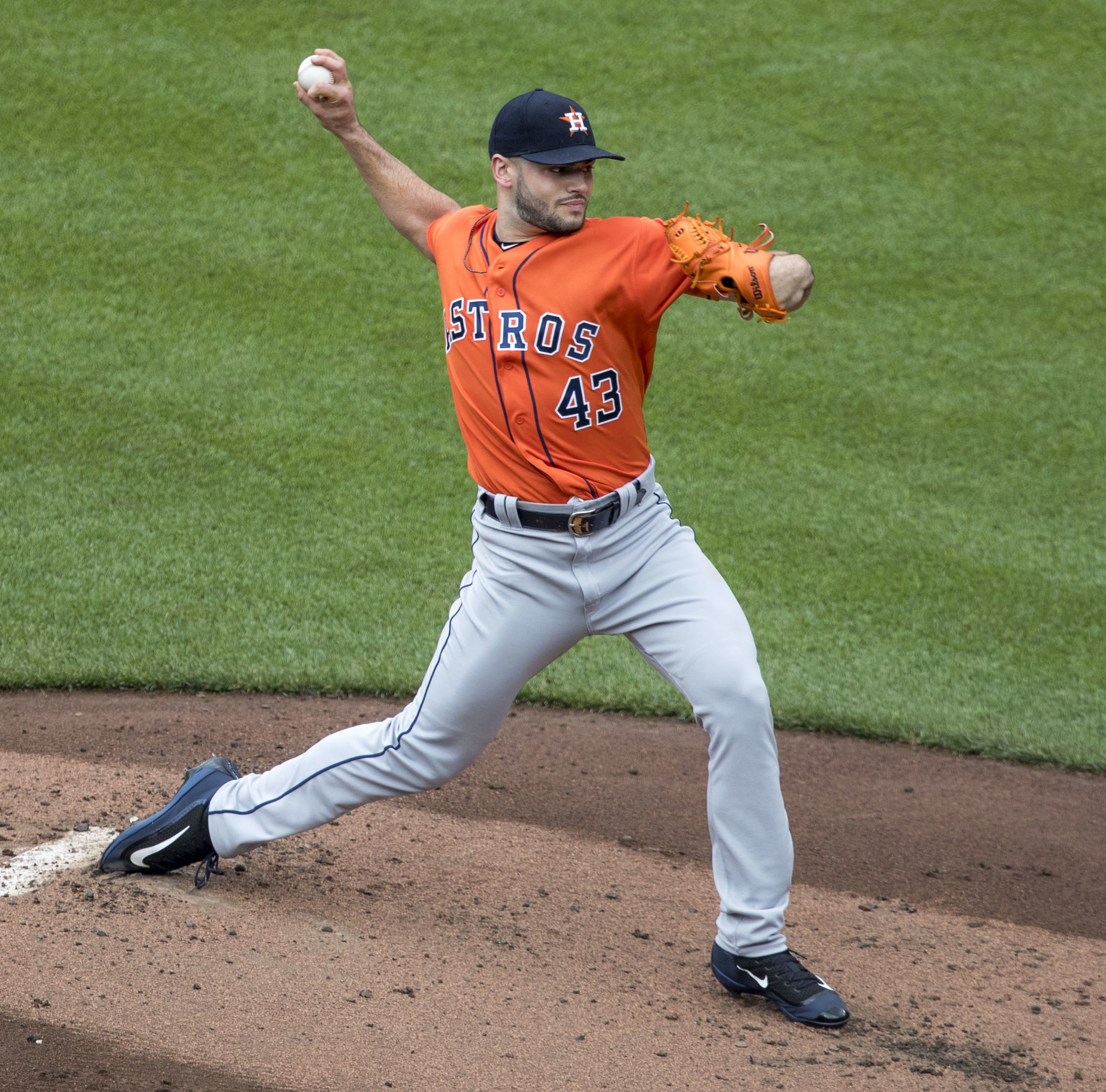
Lance McCullers Jr. (2012)

Through the completion of the 2019 season, 53 Greenville Astros have also played in at least one game in Major League Baseball during their careers.

Player	Season(s)	Position	Ref.
Fernando Abad	2007	Pitcher	Ref.
Bryan Abreu	2016–2017	Pitcher	
R. J. Alaniz	2010	Pitcher	
Jorge Alcalá	2016	Pitcher	
Jose Altuve	2008–2009	Second baseman	
Brandon Barnes	2005–2006	Outfielder	
Jimmy Barthmaier	2004	Pitcher	
José Cisnero	2009	Pitcher	
Carlos Correa	2012	Shortstop	
Jorge de León	2008	Shortstop	
Dean Deetz	2014	Pitcher	
Delino DeShields Jr.	2010	Outfielder	
Michael Feliz	2012	Pitcher	
Mike Foltynewicz	2010	Pitcher	
Enderson Franco	2013	Pitcher	
Víctor Gárate	2005	Pitcher	
Sammy Gervacio	2005	Pitcher	
Alfredo González	2013	Catcher	
Zac Grotz	2015	Pitcher	
Reymin Guduan	2014	Pitcher	
Jandel Gustave	2013	Pitcher	
Juan Gutiérrez	2004	Pitcher	
Mike Hauschild	2012	Pitcher	
Elieser Hernández	2014	Pitcher	
Adrian Houser	2011–2012	Pitcher	
Josh James	2014	Pitcher	
Jordan Jankowski	2012	Pitcher	
Ramón Laureano	2014	Outfielder	
Arcenio León	2007–2008	Pitcher	
Jordan Lyles	2008	Pitcher	
Jason Martin	2014	Outfielder	
David Martínez	2009	Pitcher	
J. D. Martinez	2009	Outfielder	
Jack Mayfield	2013	Shortstop	
Lance McCullers Jr.	2012	Pitcher	
Joe Musgrove	2012	Pitcher	
Jacob Nottingham	2014	Catcher	
Troy Patton	2004	Pitcher	
Felipe Paulino	2004	Pitcher	
Brett Phillips	2013	Outfielder	
Richard Rodríguez	2012	Pitcher	
Rio Ruiz	2012	Third baseman	
Patrick Sandoval	2016	Pitcher	
Troy Scribner	2013	Pitcher	
Myles Straw	2015	Outfielder	
Abraham Toro	2016	Third baseman	
J. R. Towles	2004	Catcher	
Kyle Tucker	2015	Outfielder	
José Urquidy	2015	Pitcher	
Framber Valdez	2016	Pitcher	
Vince Velasquez	2010	Pitcher	
Henry Villar	2008	Pitcher	
Tyler White	2013	Third baseman	
