= Jose Altuve =

Venezuelan baseball player (born 1990)

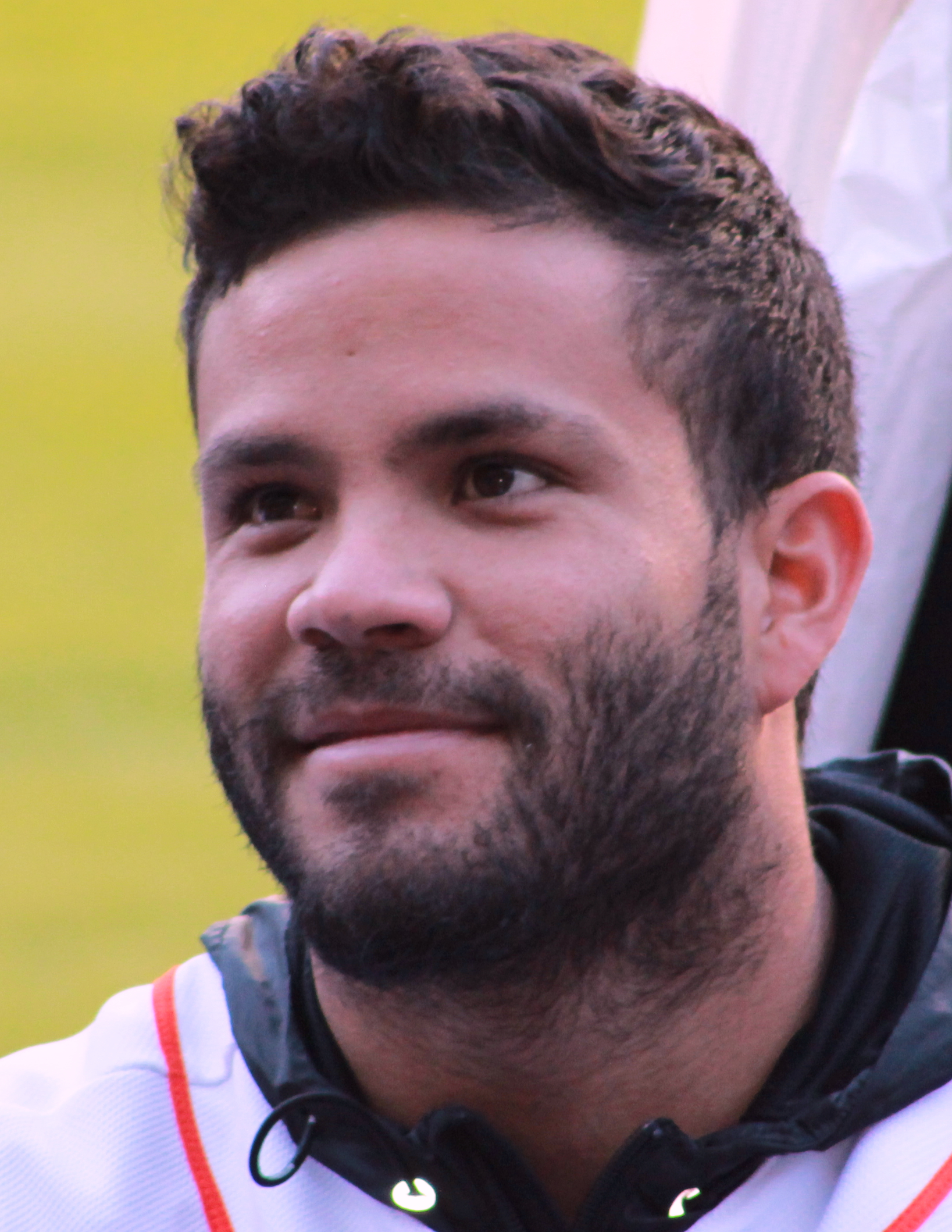
- Altuve with the Houston Astros in 2015

Houston Astros – No. 27
- Second baseman
- Born: May 6, 1990 (age 36); Maracay, Venezuela
- Bats: Right Throws: Right

MLB debut
- July 20, 2011, for the Houston Astros

MLB statistics (through 2026 season)
- Batting average: .300
- Hits: 2,519
- Home runs: 271
- Runs batted in: 939
- Stolen bases: 330
- Stats at Baseball Reference

Teams
- Houston Astros (2011–present)

Career highlights and awards
- 9× All-Star (2012, 2014–2018, 2021, 2022, 2024); 2× World Series champion (2017, 2022); AL MVP (2017); All-MLB First Team (2022); ALCS MVP (2019); Gold Glove Award (2015); 7× Silver Slugger Award (2014–2018, 2022, 2024); AL Hank Aaron Award (2017); 3× AL batting champion (2014, 2016, 2017); 2× AL stolen base leader (2014, 2015)

Jose Carlos Altuve (Spanish pronunciation: [alˈtuβe]; born May 6, 1990) is a Venezuelan professional baseball second baseman for the Houston Astros of Major League Baseball (MLB). Having played for the Astros since 2011, he is the longest-tenured current member of the team, and the only one to have been with the Astros since they were in the National League. Altuve is widely regarded as one of the greatest Astros in franchise history, and one of the best second basemen of all time. On the international stage, he has represented the Venezuelan national team in the 2017 and 2023 World Baseball Classics (WBC).

Born and raised in Maracay, Venezuela, Altuve was signed by the Astros as an amateur free agent in 2007, and he made his major league debut in 2011. He is the shortest active MLB player, at 5 feet 6 inches (1.68 m), and his listed weight is 166 pounds (75 kg). He has the most home runs for all players of his height in MLB history. Altuve quickly established himself as a premier contact hitter; from 2014 to 2017, Altuve recorded at least 200 hits each season (with his 225 hits in 2014 being an Astros record), leading the American League in the category each year, and won three batting championships (becoming the first Astro to win a batting title) in that span. In 2014, he became the first player in over 80 years to reach 130 hits and 40 stolen bases before the All-Star Game. He has also won seven Silver Slugger Awards, tied for the most all-time by a second baseman, and one Gold Glove.

In 2017, he won the AL Most Valuable Player Award and the Hank Aaron Award, and won the 2017 World Series with the Astros. In the same year, Altuve was Sports Illustrated's co-Sportsperson of the Year with J. J. Watt of the NFL's Houston Texans for helping to lead relief efforts in the aftermath of Hurricane Harvey. Other awards Altuve received in 2017 were the Associated Press Male Athlete of the Year, The Sporting News Major League Player of the Year (making him the fifth player to be selected in consecutive years), and Baseball America's Major League Player of the Year. After hitting a walk-off home run to win the 2019 American League Championship Series, Altuve was awarded his first ALCS MVP, and would later win the 2022 World Series with the Astros. Although Altuve received criticism for the Houston Astros sign stealing scandal, later reports demonstrated that Altuve did not participate in the scheme.

Altuve's nine MLB All-Star selections are the most for an Astro, and he has been voted the starting second baseman in the All-Star Game six times, an achievement accomplished only by two other players in that position in American League history. He has twice led the AL in stolen bases. As part of an era that has seen the Astros win two World Series titles and four pennants in six seasons, Altuve has become one of the greatest postseason hitters in history; through the 2026 postseason, he ranks second all-time in postseason home runs (28), second in runs scored (90), third in hits (120), seventh in games played (107), and seventh in RBIs (57); ten of his home runs were go-ahead home runs (three in the ninth inning), the most in postseason history. He is the only player to have recorded 120 hits and 25 home runs for a postseason career. He had 31 games with four hits from 2011 to 2021, the most among any player in that span in MLB, and he also has the most 3+ hit games in MLB since 2011 with over 200.

== Early life ==
Altuve is a native of Maracay, Venezuela, and grew up there. At age seven, he met fellow future major leaguer Salvador Pérez, who became a catcher for the Kansas City Royals. The two competed together beginning in Maracay and many times in American League games.

== Professional career ==
=== Minor leagues ===
At age 16, Altuve attended a Houston Astros tryout camp in Maracay. However, the team's scouts declined to allow him to participate because they decided he was too short and they suspected that he had lied about his age. The next day, with encouragement from his father, Altuve returned to the camp and produced his birth certificate. Al Pedrique, then a special assistant for the Astros, asked Altuve, "Can you play?" Altuve looked him in the eye and said, "I'll show you." Pedrique championed him to the front office, convincing them that he had the talent and strength to eventually play in the major leagues. The club gave him an evaluation, and, after he impressed team officials, they signed him to a contract as an international free agent on March 6 2007, with a $15,000 (USD, $23,000 today) bonus.

After a strong 2007 season in the Venezuelan Summer League in which he hit .343, Altuve moved to the United States in 2008 and hit .284 in 40 games for the Greeneville Astros in the Rookie-level Appalachian League. He returned to Greeneville in 2009 and hit .324 with 21 stolen bases in just 45 games, earning him a spot on the league All-Star team, team most valuable player (MVP) honors, and a promotion to the Tri-City ValleyCats of the Class A-Short Season New York-Penn League for which he played in 21 games. He began 2010 with the Lexington Legends of the Class A South Atlantic League, hitting .308 with 39 steals and 11 home runs, earned a spot on the league all-star team, and then moved up to the Lancaster JetHawks in the Class A-Advanced California League and hit .276.

Returning to Lancaster for 2011, he hit .408 with 19 steals in 52 games. After being promoted to the Corpus Christi Hooks of the Class AA Texas League, he hit .361, giving him an overall line of .389 with 24 steals, 26 walks, and 40 strikeouts in 357 minor league at-bats that year. He was named the second baseman on Baseball America's 2011 Minor League All-Star Team as well as the Houston Astros Minor League Player of the Year. Altuve was called up to the major league club in mid-summer, bypassing Class AAA level.

=== Houston Astros ===
==== 2011 ====
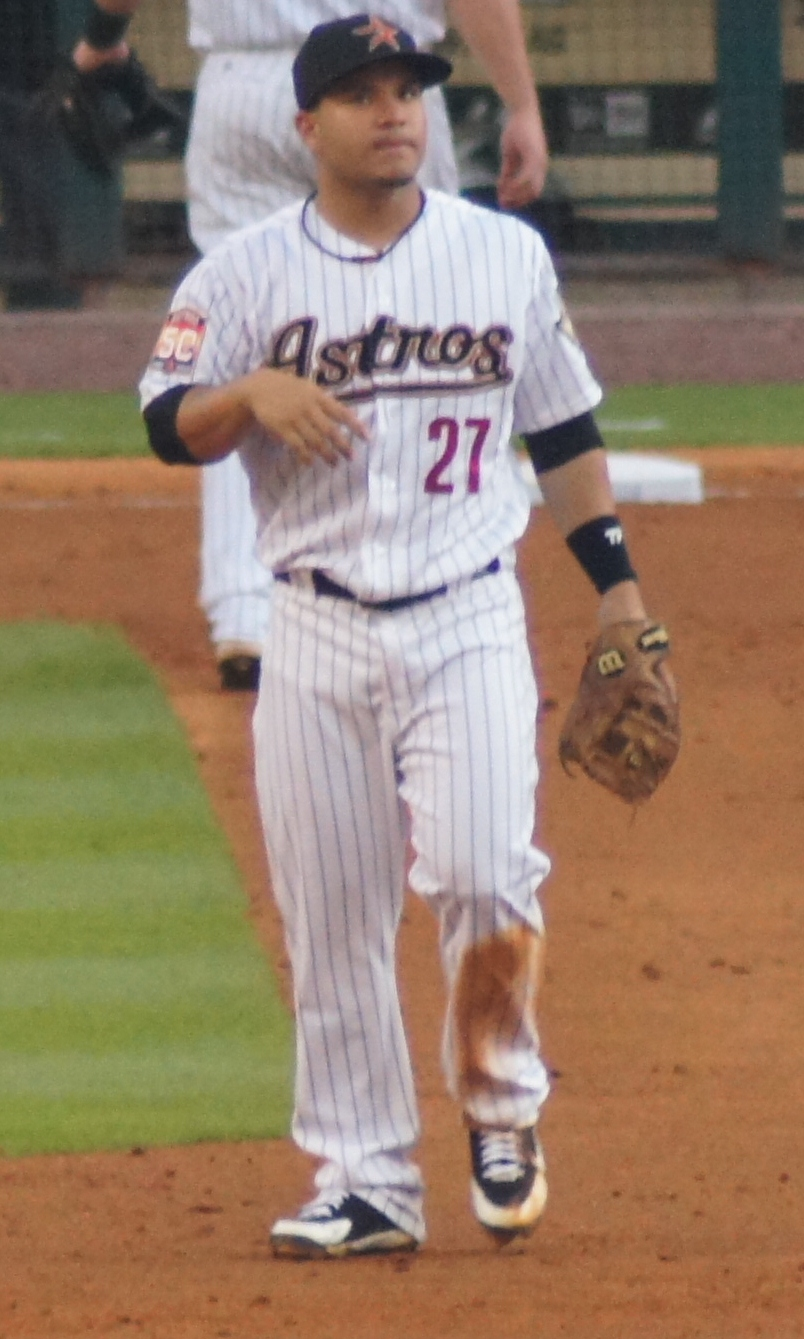
Altuve on the field on April 6, 2012

Altuve was tabbed to represent the Astros at the 2011 All-Star Futures Game in June and played the game on July 10. Nine days later, the Astros promoted Altuve to the major leagues on July 19, 2011. He started his first game on July 20, going 1-for-5 as the starting second baseman versus the Washington Nationals, collecting his first hit as a single off Tyler Clippard in the 9th inning. He was named the second baseman on Baseball America's 2011 Minor League All-Star team. On July 27, 2011, Altuve tied Russ Johnson for the Astros record for most consecutive games with a hit to start a career with 7. On August 20, 2011, Altuve hit an inside-the-park home run, his first major league home run. He became the first Astros player since Adam Everett in 2003 to hit an inside-the-park home run, the first Astros player to get his first major league home run on an inside-the-park home run since pitcher Butch Henry in 1992, and the first Astros player to lead off a game with an inside-the-park home run since Bill Doran in 1987. He batted .346 over his first 21 games before slumping a bit and ended the year with a .276 average. He also hit two home runs, stole seven bases, and posted a .358 slugging percentage in 221 at-bats.

Altuve returned to Venezuela to play for Navegantes del Magallanes, based in Valencia, Carabobo, in the Venezuelan Winter League. He hit .339 with a .381 on-base percentage and a .455 slugging percentage. Altuve finished 2011 with 898 aggregated plate appearances, including 391 in the minors, 234 with Houston, and 273 with the Magallanes. Altuve had 82 hits in winter league, bringing his cumulative year-end count to 282.

==== 2012 ====
On May 1, 2012, Altuve faced New York Mets reliever Jon Rauch, the tallest player in major league history at 6 feet 11 inches (2.11 m). The 18-inch (460 mm) height difference is believed to be the biggest between pitcher and batter except for a 1951 publicity stunt in which a 3-foot-7-inch (1.09 m) Eddie Gaedel had one plate appearance for the St. Louis Browns. Altuve was the Astros' representative at the All-Star Game, played at Kauffman Stadium in Kansas City, Missouri. This was his first career selection in the final year that the team played in the National League prior to moving to the American League for 2013. In his first full year, he played 147 games and had 167 hits while batting. 290 with 33 stolen bases on 44 attempts.

==== 2013 ====
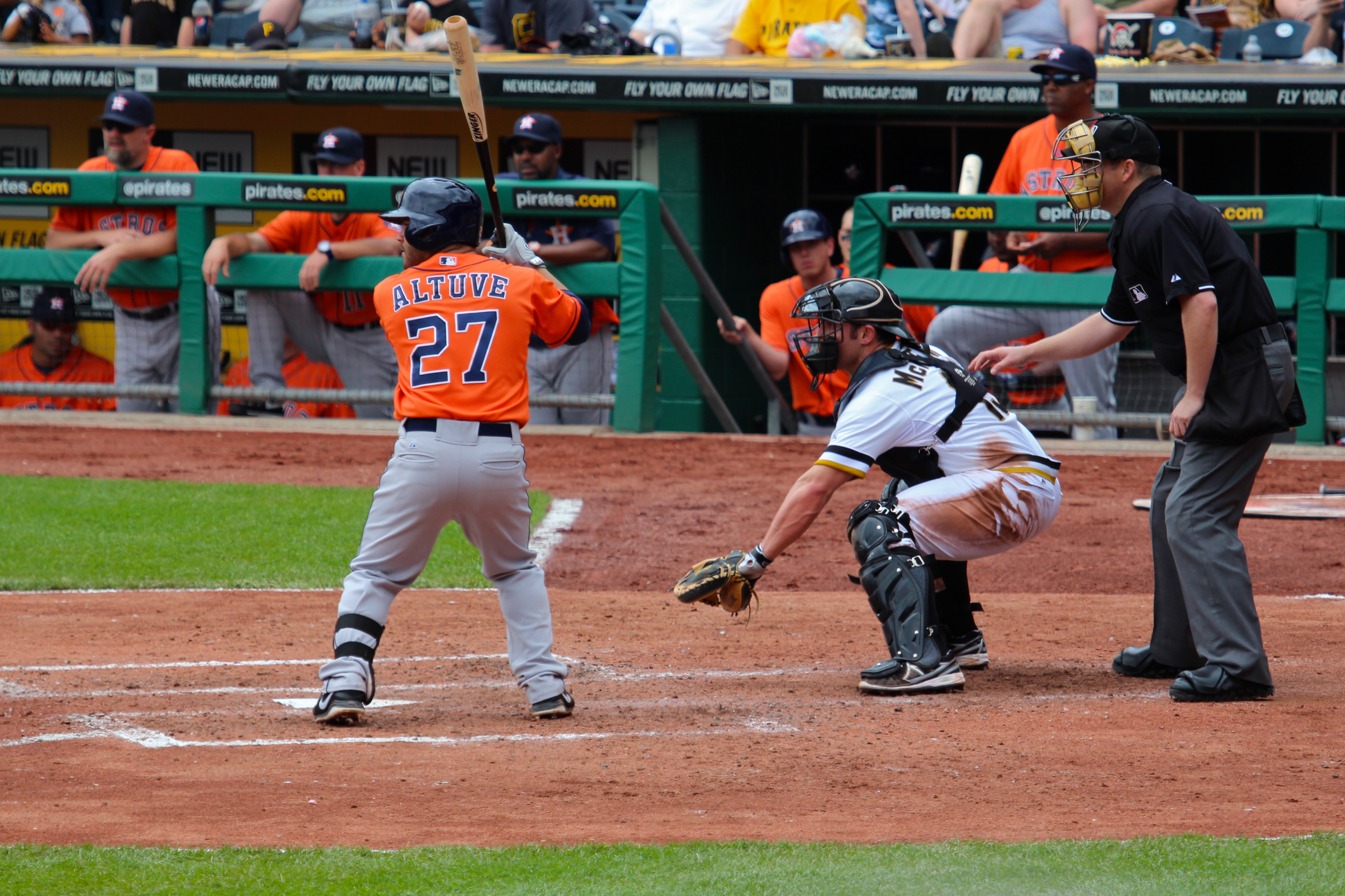
Altuve batting against the Pittsburgh Pirates on May 19, 2013

On July 13, 2013, Altuve signed a four-year, $12.5 million extension that included two club options for 2018 and 2019 worth $6 and $6.5 million, respectively. The deal also included a $750,000 bonus to be received in 2013. At the time of the extension, Altuve was hitting .280 with 21 stolen bases, 15 doubles, and 28 RBI. Altuve finished the season batting .283 in 152 games and stole 35 bases but led the league in caught stealing with 13.

==== 2014 ====
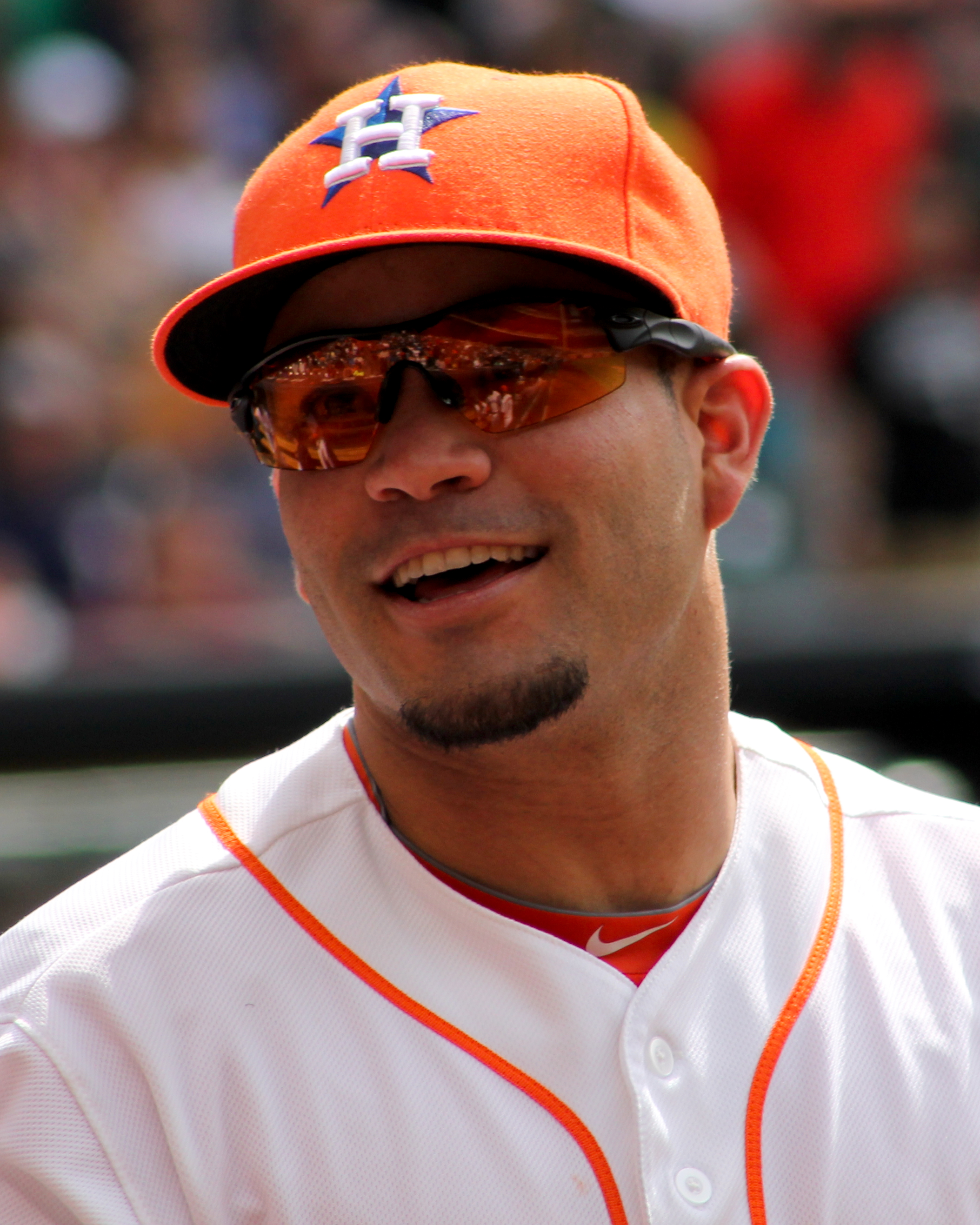
Altuve in 2014

On June 29, 2014, Altuve stole two bases in a game against the Detroit Tigers. This made him the first MLB player since Ray Chapman in 1917 to steal two or more bases in four consecutive games. Altuve became the first MLB player since 1933 to have 130 hits and 40 stolen bases before the All-Star Break. Altuve was named to the 2014 All-Star Game. Coupled with his 2012 All-Star appearance in the Astros' final season as a National League team, Altuve is the only player in Major League history to represent both the American and National Leagues in the All-Star Game while still being a member of the same team.

On September 16, Altuve hit a single up the middle to break Craig Biggio's franchise single-season hit record of 210 hits. The Astros had 11 games remaining in the season at the time that Altuve broke the record. In 158 games, Altuve totaled 225 hits and a .341 batting average, both of which led the major leagues, and 56 stolen bases, which led the American League. He also hit 47 doubles, seven home runs, and 59 RBI. He became the first Astros player to win a batting title.

After the 2014 season, Altuve traveled to Japan to participate in the 2014 Major League Baseball Japan All-Star Series. He was named the GIBBY/This Year in Baseball Award winner as the Breakout Everyday Player of the Year. He won the first Silver Slugger Award of his career, as the top hitter among American League second basemen. He was also bestowed his first iteration of the Luis Aparicio Award, annually given to the Venezuelan judged to produce the best individual performance.

==== 2015 ====
The Astros set a franchise record with 18–7 record to start the 2015 season, fueled in part by Altuve's 11-game hitting streak spanning April 21 – May 2. He also earned AL co-Player of the Week honors with Oakland's Josh Reddick on May 3 after a .467 hitting performance (14-for-30), seven runs, eight RBI, five doubles, and one home run.

Altuve was voted as the AL's starting second baseman for the MLB All-Star Game, edging Kansas City's Omar Infante by more than 600,000 votes. Voted as a starter for the first time, Altuve joined Biggio and Jeff Kent as the third Astros starting baseman at the All-Star Game.

On September 11, 2015, Altuve recorded his 800th career hit, surpassing Biggio for the fastest Astro player to reach 800 hits. In the final game of the season, Altuve went 3-for-5 to reach 200 hits for the second season in a row, which led the American League, while becoming both the first player in Astros history and Venezuelan to accumulate multiple 200-hit seasons. He also led the AL in stolen bases (38), and his .313 batting average was third-best in the majors. He reached then-career highs with each of 15 home runs, .459 SLG, 86 runs scored, and 66 RBI. He led American League second basemen in fielding percentage (.993).

The Astros clinched a playoff berth on the final day of the season, securing their place in the AL Wild Card Game versus the New York Yankees. Thus, Altuve made the MLB playoffs for the first time in his career. The Astros defeated the Yankees, 3−0. Altuve drove in Jonathan Villar in the seventh inning versus Yankee reliever Dellin Betances for the final run of the contest. Next, the Astros faced the Royals in the American League Division Series (ALDS), but were eliminated in five games.

Altuve was awarded his first career Rawlings Gold Glove Award for second base on November 10, 2015. He also received his second consecutive Silver Slugger Award.

==== 2016 ====
For his performance in June 2016, Altuve was named AL Player of the Month for the first time in his career. He had batted .420, six doubles, four home runs, 15 RBI, six stolen bases, and 1.112 OPS (.492 OBP/.620 SLG) in 26 games. He became an All-Star selection for the fourth time of his career, and started for the second consecutive time.

On August 16, Altuve collected his 1,000th hit, setting the Astros' franchise record for the fewest games to do so (786) after a three-hit night versus the St. Louis Cardinals. He also was the second-fastest among active players to do so, following Ichiro Suzuki (696 games).

In 161 games, Altuve had an MLB-leading 216 hits, an AL-leading .338 batting average, and 30 stolen bases. He also found a power surge with 42 doubles (the second most of his career and his third straight season with 40+ doubles), a career-high 24 home runs, and a career-high 96 RBI. This marked his second batting title, the last being in 2014.

At the end of the season, Altuve was named The Sporting News Player of the Year, and the MLBPA Players Choice Awards for Major League Player of the Year, AL Outstanding Player, and Majestic Athletic Always Game Award. He placed third in the AL MVP voting, behind winner Mike Trout and Mookie Betts.

==== 2017 ====
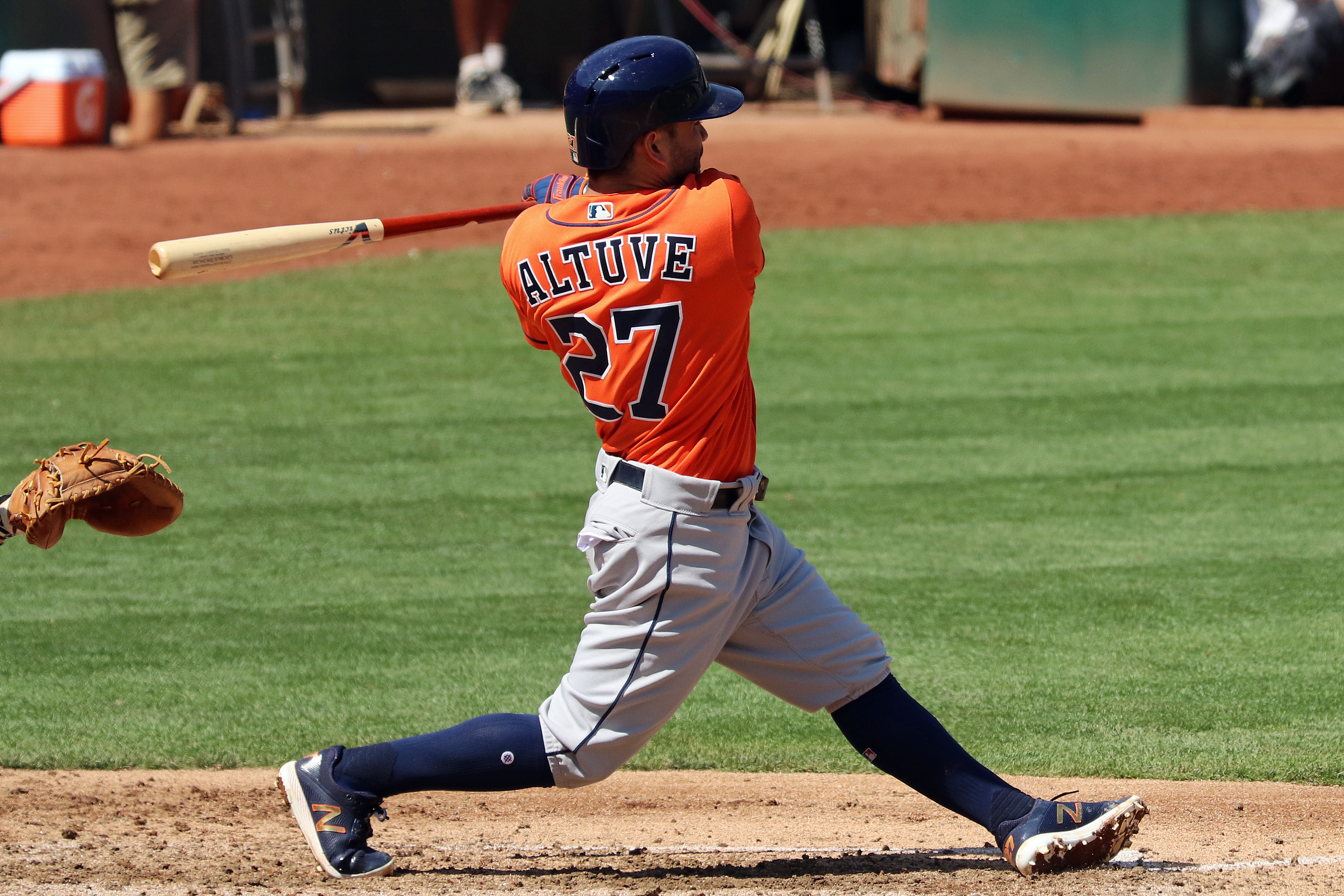
Jose Altuve batting at the Oakland Coliseum, September 10, 2017

Altuve served as the Astros' number three hitter during the 2017 season. Voted as a starter in the All-Star Game at Marlins Park in Miami, he batted leadoff and played second base. Over two games versus the Baltimore Orioles and Philadelphia Phillies on July 23–24, he set the club record for hits in consecutive plate appearances with eight.

In July, Altuve hit .485 for the fifth-highest average in one month since 1961. Over 23 games, he accumulated 48 hits, 10 doubles, one triple, four home runs, 21 RBI, and 1.251 OPS. He carried a 19-game hitting streak from July 2 to 23. He also recorded five consecutive multi-hit games during the week of July 3–9, becoming the ninth player in MLB history to do so. His average set the Astros record for one calendar month—surpassing Richard Hidalgo's .476 average in September of 2000—and he won his second AL Player of the Month Award.

Altuve concluded the 2017 campaign by playing in 153 contests with an MLB-leading and career-best .346 batting average, an AL-leading 204 hits, a major-league leading 30 infield hits, 39 doubles, 32 stolen bases, 24 home runs, and 84 RBI. He led all MLB hitters (140 or more plate appearances) in batting average against right-handers, at .344. The Astros finished with a 101−61 record, clinching the AL West division. Altuve became just the fifth hitter since integration in 1947 to record four straight 200-hit seasons, following Wade Boggs (1983−89), Kirby Puckett (1986−89), Suzuki (2001−2010), and Michael Young (2003−07). He also became the first hitter in Major League history to solely lead his respective league in hits for four years in a row while also collecting his third career batting title. (Note: Suzuki also led the AL in hits from 2006 to 2010, but tied with Dustin Pedroia in 2008.) He also led the American League in power–speed number (27.4). On September 19, he was announced as the recipient of MLB's Lou Gehrig Memorial Award for 2017, as the player "who best exemplifies the giving character" of Gehrig. With 1,250 career hits at the end of 2017, only Ty Cobb, Hank Aaron, and Pete Rose had accumulated more hits through their age-27 season.

In Game 1 of the ALDS against the Boston Red Sox, Altuve hit three home runs in a single game for the first time in his career while becoming the tenth player to hit three home runs in a single postseason game. The Astros faced the New York Yankees in the American League Championship Series (ALCS). After taking the first two games in Houston, with Altuve scoring the winning run in Game 2, Altuve and the Astros offense slumped as they lost all three middle games at Yankee Stadium. He hit a solo home run in a 4−0, Game 7 win in which the Astros advanced to their second World Series in franchise history, to face the National League pennant-winning Los Angeles Dodgers.

In Game 2 of the World Series, Altuve, along with two Astros teammates–Carlos Correa and George Springer—and two Dodgers players–Charlie Culberson and Yasiel Puig—all homered in extra innings as the Astros prevailed, 7−6. The five home runs accounted for the most hits in extra innings of any single game in major league history. Altuve homered in the bottom of the fifth inning of Game 5, tying the score 7–7, and hit a game-tying double in the eighth, before the Astros prevailed 13–12 in the bottom of the 10th inning with a walk-off single from Alex Bregman. The World Series went on for seven games, and the Astros prevailed for the first title in franchise history.

In the Astros' 18-game championship run, Altuve batted .310/.388/.634, 22 hits, 14 runs scored, seven home runs, 14 RBI, and nine extra-base hits. He established a franchise record for total hits in a postseason. Further, he tied the record for home runs by a second baseman in a single postseason and hit the fourth-most among all players. Along with pitcher Justin Verlander, Altuve was named winner of the Babe Ruth Award as MVP of the 2017 postseason.

Prior to Game 2 of the World Series, Altuve was presented with the Hank Aaron Award, the first of his career, as the "most outstanding offensive performer" in the American League. It was the first time a Houston Astros player had won the prize. Next, he was named The Sporting News Major League Player of the Year for the second consecutive season, following Ted Williams (1941−42), Joe Morgan (1975−76), Albert Pujols (2008−09), and Miguel Cabrera (2012−13) as repeat winners in consecutive years of the honor given out since 1936. Other awards Altuve received in 2017 included Baseball America's Major League Player of the Year award, becoming the first Venezuelan since Johan Santana in 2006 to receive the award bestowed since 1998. He was also the first second baseman and first Astro ever to win it. For the second consecutive season, he won the Players Choice Awards for Major League Player of the Year and AL Outstanding Player. He won his fourth consecutive and overall Silver Slugger Award at second base.

The Astros selected Altuve's option for 2018, worth a reported $6 million, on November 3, 2017. On November 16, Altuve was conferred the AL Most Valuable Player Award, only the second Astro to win the award, following Jeff Bagwell in 1994. Altuve became the tenth second baseman to be granted MVP, and was the shortest player to win since Phil Rizzuto, also 5' 6", in 1950. Altuve became the first player since Buster Posey in 2012—and the eighth player overall—to win a batting title, regular season MVP, and World Series in the same season. On December 5, Altuve and Houston Texans defensive end J. J. Watt were named co-winners of the Sports Illustrated Sportsperson of the Year Award for Altuve's efforts in leading the Astros to their first World Series title while he and Watts aided in the recovery of the Greater Houston area in the aftermath of Hurricane Harvey. Altuve became the 18th Major League Baseball player to win the award in its 64-year history, and both the first Houston Astro and first Venezuelan player. He was also selected the 2017 Associated Press Male Athlete of the Year.

In 2019, Altuve's role in the 2017 World Series gained nationwide attention in the Houston Astros sign stealing scandal. With regard to the scandal, Altuve said, "I'm not going to say to you that it was good — it was wrong. We feel bad, we feel remorse, like I said, the impact on the fans, the impact on the game — we feel bad." According to the website signstealingscandal.com, Altuve's instances of hearing the trash can banging were significantly lower than those of any other everyday player. Peter Gammons noted in 2022 that when he talked to Altuve in 2020 about how players, coaches, and members in the organization believed that Altuve did not participate in the stealing, Altuve declined to talk about it. He stated that it would be a "betrayal of my teammates" to discuss the matter and asked that Gammons not write about it. Despite this, many Astros players have defended Altuve in particular for any wrongdoing. Carlos Correa, in an interview with Ken Rosenthal, stated Altuve's role in the scandal: "The few times that the trash can was banged was without his consent, and he would go inside the clubhouse and inside the dugout to whoever was banging the trash can and he would get pissed. He would get mad. He would say, 'I don't want this. I can't hit like this. Don't you do that to me.' He played the game clean"; Correa's comments came after Dodgers outfielder Cody Bellinger accused Altuve of stealing the MVP Award from runner-up Aaron Judge.

==== 2018 ====
Prior to the 2018 season, Sports Illustrated ranked Altuve as the #2 player in baseball, trailing only Trout. On March 16, 2018, Altuve and the Astros agreed to a five-year, $151 million contract extension that would span the 2020–24 seasons. His current contract included a $6 million salary in 2018 and a $6.5 million team option in 2019. It was the largest contract in team history, and he became the sixth player to agree to a contract with an average annual value of $30 million per season or greater.

Altuve reached 1,000 games played in his career on April 17, 2018, versus the Seattle Mariners. He became the 20th player to appear in 1,000 games for the Astros. Over three games versus the Cleveland Indians spanning May 25–27, he realized a base hit in each of 10 consecutive at-bats, breaking his own club record of eight which he had set the year prior. The streak included three doubles, one triple, and one home run.

On July 8, 2018, Altuve was selected as the starting second baseman for the American League in the All-Star Game, collecting the most votes of any player with 4,849,630 votes. It was his 6th All-Star selection overall, his 5th consecutive appearance, and 4th straight start. On July 29, Altuve was placed on the disabled list for the first time in his MLB career due to right knee discomfort. Plagued with a right knee injury, the Astros announced that Altuve would serve as the designated hitter for the remainder of the season. In 137 games, Altuve finished with a .316 average, 13 home runs, and 61 RBI.

With the Astros finishing the year 103–59, the team clinched the AL West again, sweeping the Cleveland Indians in 3 games before eventually falling to the Red Sox in the ALCS. On October 19, 2018, Altuve officially underwent surgery to repair a patella avulsion fracture in his right knee. On November 8, Altuve was awarded his fifth career Silver Slugger Award and his fifth consecutive award. Having won his fifth award at second base, it tied him with Robinson Canó for most awards for an American League second baseman and second most all-time behind Ryne Sandberg.

==== 2019 ====
On April 9 2019, Altuve hit his 100th career home run off New York Yankees pitcher Jonathan Loáisiga. He became the 16th player in Astros history to reach 100 home runs. On April 12, Altuve connected for his second career grand slam, and first since 2014, in a 10–6 win over the Seattle Mariners. Altuve would hit another home run off of Félix Hernández the next night, making it the fifth consecutive game with a home run and sixth home run in that span. Altuve was the first Astro to hit a home run in five consecutive games since Morgan Ensberg's franchise-record six consecutive games in 2006.

Altuve was placed on the injured list on May 12 with a left hamstring strain, missing 35 games until returning versus the Cincinnati Reds on June 19. At the time, he had hit nine home runs, though his overall batting line was down from his career norm, at .243/.329/.472 (117 wRC+).

On July 2, 2019, Altuve doubled in the top of the seventh for his third of four hits in a 9–8 victory over the Colorado Rockies. His 142nd career three-hit game, Altuve passed Jeff Bagwell for second-most in Astros history, behind Craig Biggio (225). It was also Altuve's second straight game with at least three hits, a 6–1 victory over the Seattle Mariners on June 30. He hit his third career grand slam and second of the season on July 14, yielding the Astros a franchise record-breaking ninth grand slam in a single season.

During a contest versus the St. Louis Cardinals on July 28, Altuve homered off Dakota Hudson for his 1,500th career hit, one of three hits in a 6–2 win that afternoon, in his 1,190th career game. The only players in the divisional play era to reach the milestone faster were Suzuki, Wade Boggs, Kirby Puckett, Nomar Garciaparra, Tony Gwynn, and Derek Jeter.

Altuve finished the regular season batting .298/.353/.550 with 31 home runs and 74 RBIs in 500 at-bats.

Altuve continued his hot hitting in October. During the ALDS Altuve hit 3 home runs en route to a 3–2 series victory over the Tampa Bay Rays. With his 3rd home run of the series in Game 5, Altuve hit his 11th career postseason home run, the most by any second baseman in baseball history, and drew him into a tie with George Springer for most postseason home runs by a Houston Astros player. In the ALCS, the Astros prevailed due to Altuve. In Game 6, with the game tied in the ninth inning, he hit a deep shot off Aroldis Chapman to send Houston to the World Series for the second time in three seasons. It was the fifth walk-off home run to end an LCS in MLB history. Altuve received the ALCS MVP award for his performance in the series, batting .348 with 2 home runs, 3 RBIs, 6 runs scored, and a 1.097 OPS. He also set the record for the most career postseason homers by a second baseman (13). He hit .303 with no home runs and one RBI in the 2019 World Series, which the Astros lost to the Washington Nationals.

==== 2020 ====
In 2020, he batted .219/.286/.344 with 5 home runs and 18 RBI in 192 at-bats. On July 27, 2020, Altuve hit his 300th double in his MLB career. In Game 3 of the ALDS, Altuve hit a home run in a 9–7 loss to the Oakland A's. The homer was his 14th in the postseason, tying him with Mickey Mantle and Reggie Jackson for the 5th-most home runs in postseason history, as well as the most postseason home runs by a Venezuelan. In Game 4 of the ALCS, Altuve took a 100.4 mph (161.6 km/h) four-seam fastball from Tampa Bay Rays starter Tyler Glasnow and hit the fastest pitches hit for home runs in 2020. Altuve also became the Venezuelan all-time leader in playoff RBIs in Game 5. Despite Altuve hitting three home runs in the series and clawing back from a 3–0 series deficit, the Astros fell to the Tampa Bay Rays in seven games.

In the postseason, he batted .306/.378/.565 with 5 home runs and 11 RBI in 48 at-bats.

==== 2021 ====
With the departure of teammate George Springer, second-year manager Dusty Baker came to the idea of naming Altuve to bat leadoff regularly prior to the start of the 2021 season. In the June 15 game of 2021, Altuve hit a walk-off grand slam versus the Texas Rangers. The next day, he continued with a lead-off home run against Texas; Altuve is the first player in major league history to have hit a walk-off grand slam and then hit a lead-off home run in the following game. On June 23, Altuve hit his 150th career home run, doing so off Thomas Eshelman of the Baltimore Orioles.

On July 4, 2021, after finishing as the runner-up AL second baseman in fan voting, Altuve was named to his seventh All-Star Game, tying the Astros franchise record with Craig Biggio for the most career All-Star game selections.

On September 17, 2021, Altuve hit a home run off Madison Bumgarner of the Arizona Diamondbacks at Minute Maid Park to collect his 849th career hit in the stadium, which tied him with Lance Berkman for most hits by an Astro in the venue. He then passed Berkman the next night with a double.

In Game 6 of the 2021 World Series, Altuve made his 73rd postseason start as part of the infield unit of Alex Bregman, Carlos Correa, and Yuli Gurriel, which was more postseason starts than any quartet of teammates in major league history, surpassing the Yankees' Derek Jeter, Tino Martinez, Paul O’Neill, and Bernie Williams, who had started 68 postseason contests together. In 77 total plate appearances during the 2021 playoffs, Altuve tied the record held by Carlos Beltran for most runs scored in one postseason with 21 runs.

==== 2022 ====
On May 19 2022, Altuve doubled for the 344th time in his career, which broke a tie with César Cedeño for fourth-most in Astros history. He also reached a season-high four hits to drive a 5–1 win over the Rangers. On June 23 versus the Yankees, he reached base four times, collecting three hits including two doubles in a 7–6 loss. Altuve appeared in his 1,500th career game on July 3, 2022, in a contest versus the Los Angeles Angels, going 3-for-5.

On July 8, Altuve was named the starter at second base for the American League in the MLB All-Star Game. It was his eighth selection overall, and fifth as a starter, both setting franchise records. He led AL second basemen in on-base percentage (.368), slugging percentage (.539) OPS (.907), and home runs (17). Craig Biggio (seven) previously held the record for most appearances.

On August 3, he went 4-for-4 against the Boston Red Sox, which tied his career high and tied him with Biggio for most four-hit games in team history (34). Altuve was named the Astros' Heart & Hustle Award winner on August 5, making him a nominee for the major league award in November. Altuve doubled twice, walked twice, scored twice and drove in two runs lead a 5–3 win over Texas on August 31. Altuve was 3-for-4 with a home run, double, and three RBI on September 4 versus the Angels, leading to a 9–1 win. On September 11 versus the Angels, Altuve achieved his 12th three-hit game of the season. Altuve's leadoff home run on September 19 versus the Rays started the Astros' scoring in a 4–0 win to the clinch a fifth AL West division title over the previous six seasons. On September 27, Altuve hit a leadoff home run against the Arizona Diamondbacks. It was his twelfth leadoff home run this season, tying the Astros' team record set by George Springer in 2019.

For the 2022 regular season, Altuve batted .300, reaching the mark for the first time since 2018, and tied his career high with 66 walks in 141 games. He finished eighth in the AL in batting, fourth in each of OBP (.387), SLG (.533) and OPS (.921), and third in OPS+ (160). He also ranked second both with 103 runs scored and stolen base percentage (94.74, 18-for-19), eighth in doubles (39), and tenth in total bases (281). He led the Astros in runs scored and base hits (158). Altuve won his fourth Luis Aparicio Award, (Note: Co-winner with Luis Arráez of the Minnesota Twins.) and was nominated for the AL Hank Aaron Award.

Altuve endured an 0-for-16 performance in an ALDS sweep of the Mariners, including a career-worst 0-for-8 in Game 3, which lasted a postseason record-tying 18 innings. The hitless streak extended to 25 at-bats, setting a record for most to start a postseason, until Altuve hit an opposite-field double in the fifth inning at Yankee Stadium in Game 3 of the 2022 ALCS. The Astros advanced to the World Series and defeated the Philadelphia Phillies in six games to give Altuve his second World Series title; Altuve went 8-for-26 in the series.

Following the season's conclusion, Altuve won his sixth Silver Slugger Award and first since 2018. He also finished fifth in votes for the American League MVP Award, the highest since he won the award.

==== 2023 ====
During the quarterfinals of the 2023 World Baseball Classic against the United States, Altuve was hit on the left thumb by a fastball from USA pitcher Daniel Bard, and was subsequently taken off the field. Altuve suffered a fracture of the thumb and was projected to miss more than two months. As a result of the injury, he missed an Opening Day start for the Astros for the first time in his career. (Note: The last player before Altuve to start on Opening Day at second base for the Astros was Bill Hall in 2011.) He made his regular-season debut for the Astros on May 19 2023, weeks ahead of schedule. On May 23, 2023, Altuve singled versus the Milwaukee Brewers for his 1,938th career hit, passing José Cruz for third place all-time in Astros history. On May 29, 2023, Altuve hit a grand slam in the bottom of the seventh inning to push the Astros' score to 5–4 against the Twins; with that grand slam, he surpassed 700 career RBIs and tied the club record for grand slams (7) with Carlos Lee. On June 13, he became the 344th player in MLB history with 1,000 runs scored when José Abreu hit a single to get him home from second base. Altuve collected his 35th career four-hit game on June 17 versus Cincinnati to pass Biggio for most all-time in Astros history. Altuve was placed on the injured list on July 3 due to an oblique injury and returned July 26 versus Texas.

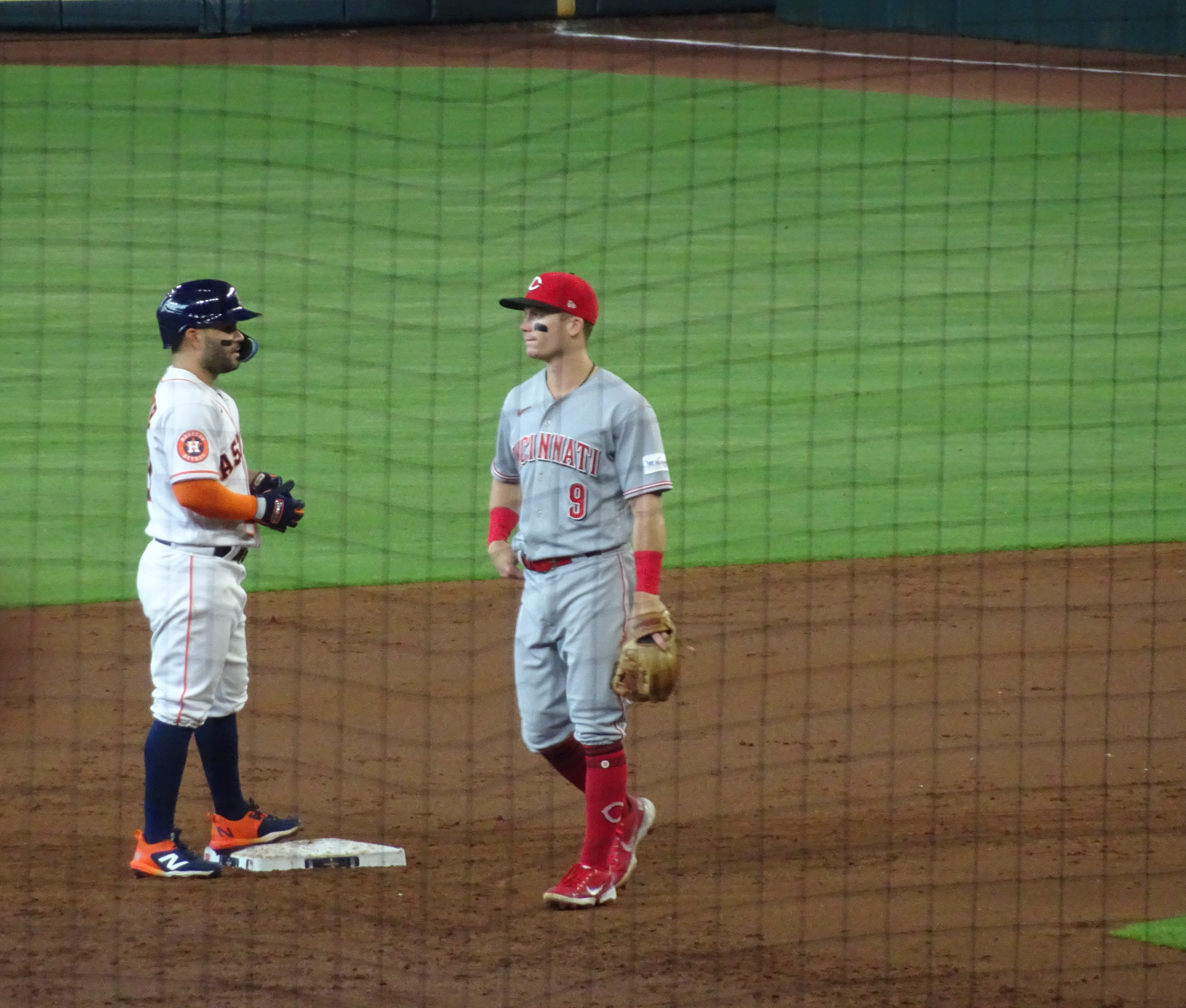
Altuve and Reds' Matt McLain in June 2023

At Yankee Stadium on August 5, Altuve stole the 288th base of his career in the first inning, tying him for third place with César Cedeño in team history. Altuve homered versus Nestor Cortés Jr. in the third inning for the 200th of his career, making him the fifth Astro to reach the milestone. (Note: The other four Astros to previously reach the milestone are Bagwell, Biggio, Berkman, and Jimmy Wynn.) Following a 13-for-25 performance to include bringing a hit streak to 14 games, Jose Altuve earned his fourth career AL Player of the Week Award to recognize his efforts for August 7–13. During the week, he collected 3 three-hit games. On August 19 at Minute Maid Park, Altuve collected his 2,000th hit. He became the fastest player in major league history to reach the hit total, 200 home runs, and 200 stolen bases, in his 1,631st game, to pass Willie Mays (1,669). (Note: Altuve became the 34th player overall to achieve all three milestones.) Altuve also reached 2,000 hits in the fewest games in Astros history. He hit for the cycle for the first time in his MLB career in a 13–5 win over the Red Sox at Fenway Park on August 28. It was the first cycle by an Astros player since then-teammate Brandon Barnes achieved it on July 19, 2013. On September 4 versus Texas, Mauricio Dubón and Altuve, batting ninth and leadoff, respectively, connected for back-to-back home runs in both the sixth and ninth innings to lead an Astros 13–6 win. Per OptaSTATS, it was the first time in major league history that the number nine and leadoff hitters hit back-to-back home runs twice in the same game.

The following game, Altuve connected for three home runs in the first three innings—becoming the fourth player in major league history to do so—to lead a 14–1 rout of Texas. The four home runs in four plate appearances tied the major league record. Altuve also became the first Astros player to hit five home runs over two games and the first to both hit for the cycle and a 3-home run game in the same season. It was Altuve's first career three home run game in the regular season, and first since Game 1 of the 2017 ALDS. He was named AL Player of the Week on September 10 after logging six home runs in a span of seven games. On September 27, Altuve attained his 400th career double, becoming the third player to hit as many for the Astros, following Biggio (668) and Bagwell (488). Altuve was recognized by the Houston chapter of the Baseball Writers' Association of America (BBWAA) as the recipient of the Darryl Kile Good Guy Award.

In Game 1 of the ALDS, Altuve hit a home run off Bailey Ober on the very first pitch to leadoff the Astros and the postseason. In Game 5 of the ALCS, Altuve hit a dramatic three-run home run off José Leclerc in the top of the ninth to take back the lead for the Astros at 5–4 after trailing 2–4, sending the Astros to an unlikely comeback victory over the Rangers. Despite a strong series performance from Altuve, batting .313 with three home runs, five RBIs, and posting a 1.040 OPS, the Astros ultimately fell to the Rangers in seven games. Game 4 of the series was Altuve's 100th career postseason game played, becoming just the seventh player in Major League history to play in 100 career postseason games.

==== 2024 ====
On February 6, 2024, Altuve signed a five-year, $125 million contract extension with the Astros that would keep him in Houston through the 2029 season.

On May 3 against the Seattle Mariners, Altuve recorded his 300th stolen base. In addition to being the third Astro with 300 stolen bases, he became the fifth player with 2,000 hits, 400 doubles, 200 home runs, 300 stolen bases, and a career batting average over .300, a mark only accomplished by Derek Jeter, Paul Molitor, Willie Mays and Roberto Alomar. Altuve also became the fifth second baseman with 300 stolen bases and 200 home runs in the history of the position, joining Joe Morgan, Ryne Sandberg, Alomar, and Biggio.

On July 3, Altuve was named the starting second baseman for the American League in the 2024 All-Star Game. It was his ninth selection overall, and sixth as a starter. His nine All-Star selections are the second most amongst active position players and tied for third overall with only Mike Trout and Clayton Kershaw having more.

On August 9, 2024, Altuve passed Jimmy Wynn for fourth place on the Astros' all-time home run list with his 224th career home run, a game-tying shot that helped the Astros win a comeback 8–4 victory against the Red Sox.

On August 19, he collected his 150th hit of the season. It was his 10th season with 150+ hits, making him the third Astro to do so in club history. On August 24, Altuve hit his 38th home run to leadoff a game, passing Ichiro Suzuki for fifth most in AL history. The Astros clinched a fourth straight AL West title on September 24, thereby sending Altuve to his ninth postseason appearance in his career.

On November 12, Altuve won his seventh career Silver Slugger Award, tying him with Ryne Sandberg for the most of any second baseman in Major League history.

==== 2025 ====
On March 3, 2025, the Astros announced that Altuve would be moved to left field for the 2025 season. On April 3, he struck out five times in a game for the first time in his career, going 0-for-5 in a 5–2 victory over the Minnesota Twins. On May 9, Altuve doubled for his 700th career extra-base hit in a 3–0 victory over the Cincinnati Reds, becoming the fourth player in Astros history to accumulate 700 extra-base hits. (Note: Altuve joined Biggio (1,014), Bagwell (969), and Berkman (727) to reach this milestone.) Altuve recorded his 40th career 4-hit game and 13th multi-home run game on May 27, leading the charge to an 11–1 win over the A's. It was also Altuve's second multi-homer game in less than a week, coming after his two-homer effort in a 9–2 win over the Mariners on May 22. On July 2, Altuve passed Jeff Bagwell for second in franchise history in hits with his 2,315th hit, doing so with a tie-breaking two-RBI single in the sixth inning against the Colorado Rockies at Coors Field; it also tied him with Eddie Mathews for 150th all-time in hits. On July 6, Altuve hit his 245th home run, overtaking Hack Wilson for the most among players that are 5'6" or shorter in MLB history. On July 30, Altuve hit a home run in the second inning against the Washington Nationals. It was his 727th extra-base hit of his career, tying him with Lance Berkman for third place on the Astros’ all-time list. He then passed Berkman on August 5 with a home run against the Miami Marlins. On August 8, he hit a home run against the New York Yankees for his 20th of the season, marking his 7th season with at least 20 home runs for a career. On August 10, he hit a home run against New York for his 250th career home run, becoming the 25th player in MLB history, the eleventh second baseman, and eighth with only one team, with 250 home runs and 250 stolen bases.

==== 2026 ====
On April 21, 2026, Altuve played his 2,000th career game to become the fifth active major leaguer to appear in as many games; he became the third Astro to do so, following Craig Biggio (2,850) and Jeff Bagwell (2,150). (Note: The other active major leaguers included Andrew McCutchen, Carlos Santana, Freddie Freeman and Paul Goldschmidt.) On September 9, Altuve recorded his 2,500th hit with a double in the third inning against the Philadelphia Phillies. He became the 102nd player in Major League history and the second active player to reach the milestone; of the 102 players with 2,500 hits, only 31 players did so in less games played than Altuve, who did it in his 2,095th career game. He finished the season with 2,519 career hits to reach the top 100 for hits in MLB history.

The Astros narrowly qualified for the postseason on the final day of the season, which marked Altuve's tenth postseason appearance for his career. He had two hits in the Wild Card Series, with one going for a home run (his 28th in postseason play) as the Astros were swept in two games by the Chicago White Sox. He moved up on the postseason hit list to 120 and thus became the first player in history with both 120 hits and 25 home runs for a postseason career.

== International career ==
Altuve represents his native Venezuela in international competition. He participated in the 2017 World Baseball Classic (WBC), splitting time at second and third base with Rougned Odor. This decision led to criticism of Venezuela manager Omar Vizquel, due to the fact that neither Altuve nor Odor had ever played third base in the majors before; both players made errors at critical moments in the second round, which eventually led to Venezuela's early exit from the tournament. Vizquel defended his managerial decisions, stating: "There's nothing we can do about it. We are trying to put the players there that got the opportunity to get some runs for us [...] It's hard for one guy to get in the lineup sometimes. I can't really bench Altuve and Odor." In Venezuela's 2017 campaign, Altuve slashed .259/.286/.259 with seven hits and one RBI.

On August 17, 2022, Altuve announced that he would again play for Venezuela in the 2023 WBC. However, during a quarterfinals loss to the United States, he sustained a left thumb fracture from an errant Daniel Bard pitch. He underwent surgery and was expected to miss the first two months of the 2023 MLB season.

Altuve did not play for Venezuela in the 2026 WBC at the request of the Astros due to lack of insurance coverage for the tournament. Despite not playing on the team, Altuve drove to Miami, the site of the semifinal and championship matches, from the Astros' spring training site in West Palm Beach and attended both their semifinal win against Italy and their championship win against the United States.

== Awards ==
Awards received
Name of award		Times	Dates	Ref.
All-MLB Team	First Team	3	2022	
All-MLB Team	Second Team	3	2019, 2024	
American League Championship Series Most Valuable Player (ALCS MVP)		1	2019	
American League Most Valuable Player (AL MVP)		1	2017	
Associated Press Male Athlete of the Year		1	2017	
Babe Ruth Award		1	2017 (Note: Co-winner with teammate Justin Verlander.)	
Baseball America Major League Player of the Year		1	2017	
Darryl Kile Good Guy Award		1	2023	
GIBBY/This Year in Baseball Award for Breakout Everyday Player of the Year		1	2014	
Hank Aaron Award		1	2017	
Lou Gehrig Memorial Award		1	2016	
Luis Aparicio Award		4	2014, 2016−17, 2022	
MLB All-Star (Note: Altuve's 2012 appearance was as a member of the National League. He is the only Astro to have represented both leagues in an All-Star Game.)		9 (Note: Voted 6× as starting second baseman for the American League, 2015−18, along with 2022 and 2024.)	2012, 2014−18, 2021, 2022, 2024	
MLB Player of the Month		2	June 2016, July 2017	
Players Choice Awards
Players Choice Awards	American League Outstanding Player	2	2016, 2017	
Players Choice Awards	Majestic Athletic Always Game Award	2	2015, 2016	
Players Choice Awards	Major League Player of the Year	2	2016, 2017	
Rawlings Gold Glove Award at second base		1	2015	
Silver Slugger Award at second base		7	2014–18, 2022, 2024	
The Sporting News Major League Player of the Year		2	2016, 2017	
Sports Illustrated Sportsperson of the Year		1	2017 (Note: Co-winner with J. J. Watt of the Houston Texans.)	

== Personal life ==
Originally listed at 5 feet 7 inches (1.70 m), Altuve is now listed at his correct height of 5 feet 6 inches (1.68 m), making him the shortest active player in Major League Baseball, and the shortest since Freddie Patek retired following the 1981 season.

Inspired by broadcasters debating how many "Altuves" a particular home run traveled, Bryan Trostel created a simple web-based calculator to calculate the distance in Official Standard Listed Altuves (OSLA). Although Altuve's listed height is 5 feet 6 inches (5.5 feet), one OSLA = 5.417 feet (5 feet 5 inches). Altuve himself has been receptive of the idea, saying "It's funny, man...When they told me how many 'Altuves' was a home run, I just laughed."

On November 1, 2016, Altuve's wife Nina gave birth to their first child, a daughter. They reside in Pearland, Texas.

Altuve has mentioned fellow Venezuelan Víctor Martínez, a former major league designated hitter and catcher, as a mentor.

Altuve is a born-again Christian and has spoken about his faith in videos released by the Astros for faith day events.

=== 2023 home burglary ===
On March 30, 2023, which was Opening Day for the 2023 baseball season, Altuve's house was burglarized. Reportedly, over $1 million in jewelry was stolen from his residence. Police arrested three men and a woman in connection with the crime. Two of the men had multiple previous convictions for burglary.

== See also ==
- Houston Astros award winners and league leaders
- List of Houston Astros team records
- List of Major League Baseball career assists as a second baseman leaders
- List of Major League Baseball career double plays as a second baseman leaders
- List of Major League Baseball career games played as a second baseman leaders
- List of Major League Baseball career doubles leaders
- List of Major League Baseball career hits leaders
- List of Major League Baseball career runs scored leaders
- List of Major League Baseball career home run leaders
- List of Major League Baseball hit records
- List of Major League Baseball players from Venezuela
- List of Major League Baseball players to hit for the cycle
- Major League Baseball titles leaders

== Notes ==
Achievements
Preceded by Adrián Beltré	American League annual hits leader 2014—2017	Succeeded by Whit Merrifield
Preceded by Jackie Bradley Jr. Aaron Judge	American League Player of the Month; June 2016; July 2017	Succeeded by Mookie Betts; Manny Machado
Preceded by Elly De La Cruz	Hitting for the cycle August 28, 2023	Succeeded by Wyatt Langford
