= Enterprise Boll Weevils =

- 1947–1952; (1936, 1947–1952); Enterprise, Alabama

Minor league affiliations
- Class: Class D (1936, 1947–1952)
- League: Alabama-Florida League (1936); Alabama State League (1947–1950); Alabama-Florida League (1951–1952)

Major league affiliations
- Team: None

Minor league titles
- League titles (0): None
- Conference titles (1): 1950
- Wild card berths (3): 1936; 1947; 1949

Team data
- Name: Enterprise Browns (1936); Enterprise Boll Weevils (1947–1952)
- Ballpark: Peanut Stadium (1947–1952)

The Enterprise Boll Weevils were a minor league baseball team based in Enterprise, Alabama. The "Boll Weevils" played as members of the Class D level Alabama State League from 1947 to 1950 and the renamed Alabama-Florida League in 1951 and 1952, winning the 1950 league pennant. The 1936 Enterprise Browns played one season in the Alabama-Florida League, preceding the Boll Weevils.

Enterprise teams hosted home minor league games at Peanut Stadium.

== History ==
=== 1936 Alabama-Florida League ===
Minor league baseball in Enterprise, Alabama began in the 1936 season. The Enterprise Browns became members of the eight–team Class D level Alabama-Florida League. The Abbeville Red Sox, Andalusia Reds, Dothan Boll Weevils, Ozark Cardinals, Panama City Papermakers, Troy Trojans and Union Springs Springers joined Enterprise in beginning league play on May 12, 1936.

The Browns placed second in the 1936 Alabama–Florida League regular season standings. With a record of 64–46, playing under managers Shovel Hodge and Vic Walker, the Browns qualified for the playoffs after finishing 4.0 games behind the first place Troy Trojans in the final standings. In the playoffs, Enterprise defeated the Ozark Cardinals two games to none. The Enterprise Browns then defeated the Dothan Boll Weevils in a one game playoff. In another one game playoff, Enterprise lost to Andalusia and were eliminated. Pitcher Joe Bingham of Enterprise led the Alabama–Florida League with 20 wins and 169 strikeouts, while teammate Jim Tennant led the league with 97 RBI. The Enterprise franchise did not return to play in the 1937 Alabama-Florida League.

=== 1947 to 1950 Alabama State League ===
In 1947, the Enterprise "Boll Weevils" resumed minor league play. Enterprise became members of the eight–team Class D level Alabama State League, which expanded from six teams. The Andalusia Arrows, Brewton Millers, Dothan Browns, Geneva Red Birds, Greenville Lions, Ozark Eagles and Troy Trojans joined Enterprise in league play.

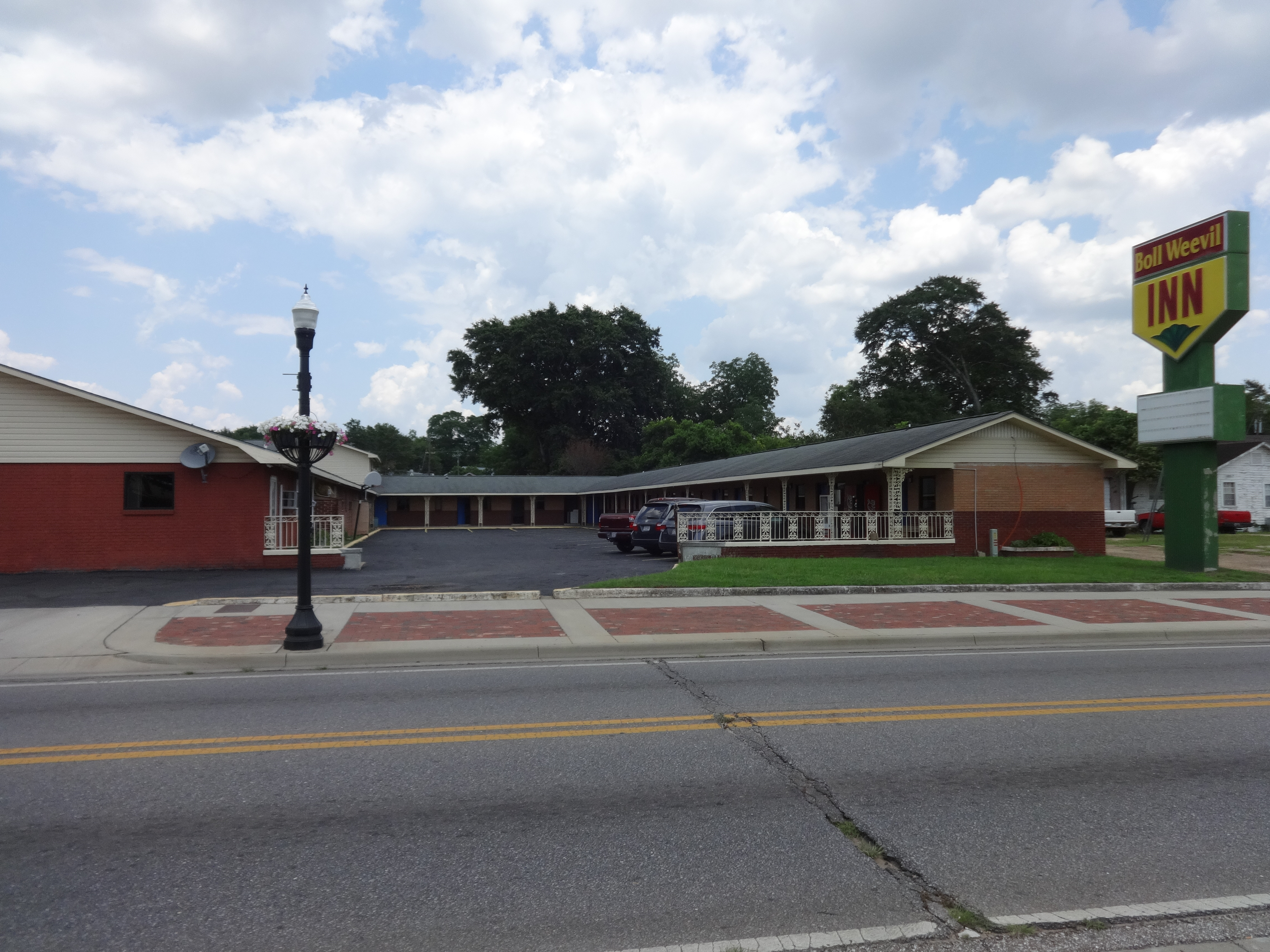
(2015) Boll Weevil Inn. Enterprise, Alabama

The Enterprise, Alabama team's use of the "Boll Weevils" moniker corresponds to the boll weevil insect, which is indigenous to the region and a celebrated agricultural foe in the community. The city of Enterprise, Alabama first erected a Boll Weevil Monument in 1919. Today, Enterprise State Community College has adopted the "Boll Weevils" nickname for their athletic teams.

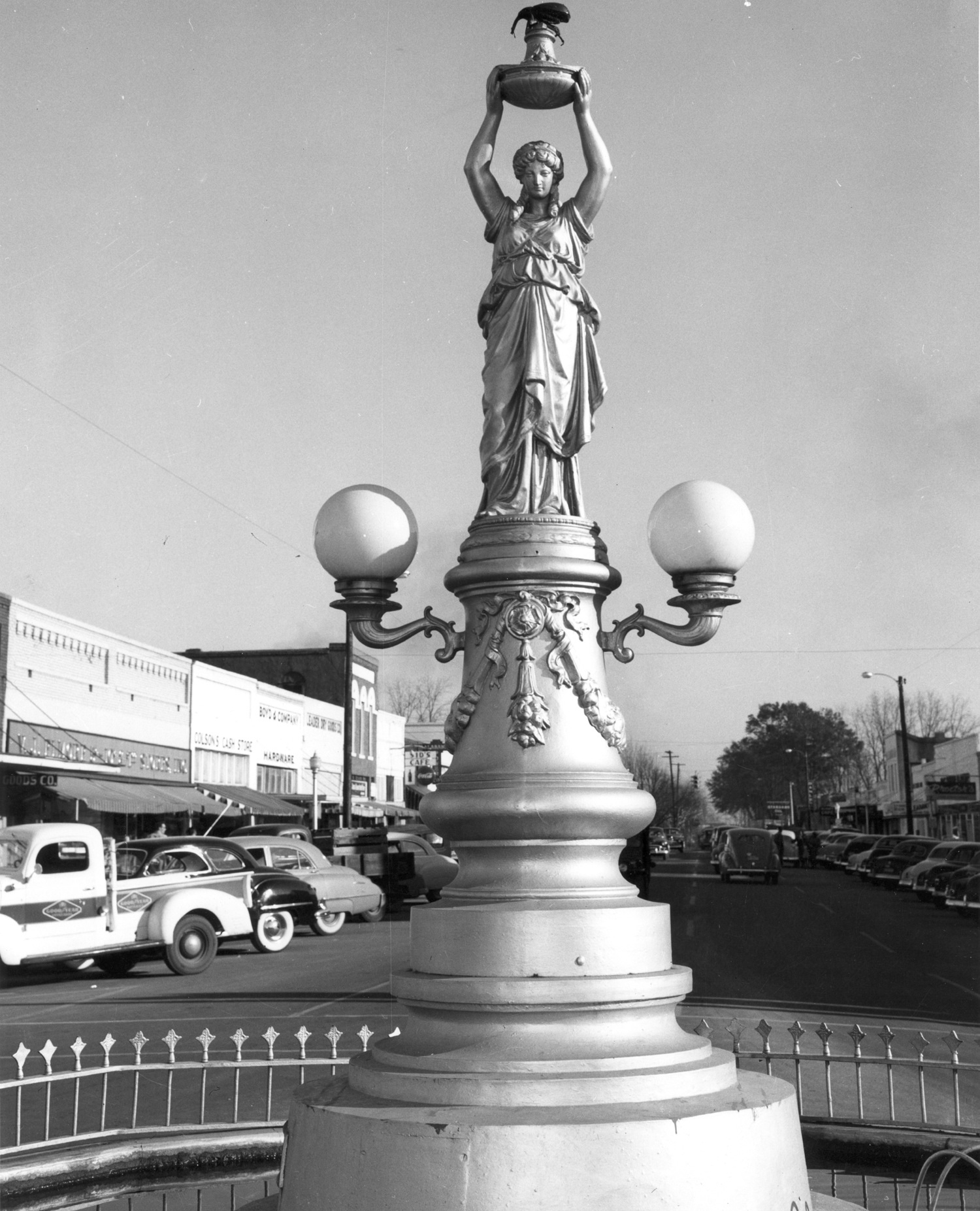
(1947) Boll weevil monument. National Register of Historic Places. Enterprise, Alabama

The Enterprise Boll Weevils placed third in the 1947 Alabama State League and qualified for the playoffs. With a record of 77–61, playing under manager Ben Catchings, the Boll Weevils finished 13.0 games behind the first place Greenville Lions in the final regular season standings. In the playoffs, the eventual champion Greenville Lions defeated Enterprise four games to three in their first round series. Enterprise player/manager Ben Catchings led the league in runs scored, with 126.

In 1948 Alabama State League play, the Enterprise Boll Weevils placed sixth and did not qualify for the playoffs in the eight–team league. The Boll Weevils finished with a 57–67 overall record to end the season, playing under managers Dolly Lambert and Richard Bixby. Enterprise finished 26.0 games behind the first place Troy Tigers in the final Alabama State League standings. Enterprise missed the four–team playoffs, where the Dothan Browns won the championship.

Continuing play as members of the 1949 Alabama State League, the Enterprise Boll Weevils qualified for the playoffs. Enterprise ended the season with a record of 63–61 to finish in third place in the eight–team league. The team was managed by Russell Taylor. The Boll Weevils finished 18½ games behind the first place Greenville Pirates in the final regular season standings. In the playoffs, Greenville defeated Enterprise four games to one and advanced to the Finals, where they were defeated by the Andalusia Arrows.

The 1950 Enterprise Boll Weevils won the Alabama State League pennant in the final season of the league. Finishing with a regular season record of 76–49, Enterprise placed first in the final regular season standings, playing under manager Paul O'Dea. Enterprise finished 4.0 games ahead of the second place Dothan Browns in the regular season final standings. In the playoffs, the Boll Weevils were defeated by the Headland Dixie Runners four games to three in their first round series. The Dolthan Browns defeated Headland in the Finals. After the 1950 season, the Alabama State League permanently folded, evolving into a new league in 1951.

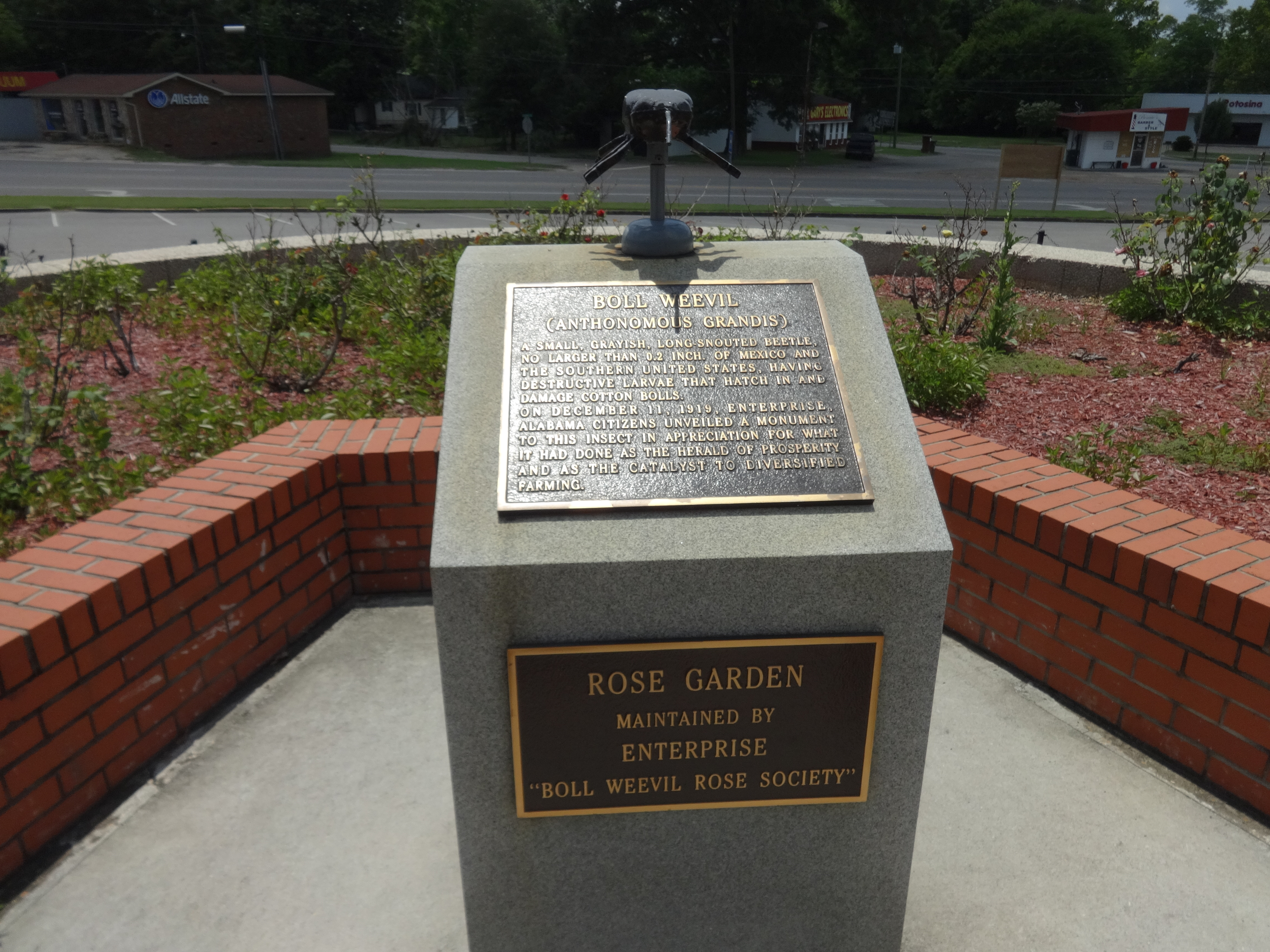
(2015) Boll Weevil monument at Enterprise City Hall. Enterprise, Alabama

=== 1951 & 1952 Alabama–Florida League ===
The 1951 Enterprise Boll Weevils returned to play as members of the reformed six–team Class D level Alabama–Florida League, as the Alabama League evolved. The Boll Weevils placed fifth in the final standings, missing the playoffs and playing under five managers during the season. With a regular season record of 44–76, Enterprise finished 40.0 games behind the first place Headland Dixie Runners. The 1951 team was first managed by Dick Hahn, who was replaced on May 11, 1951, by James Guinn. Guinn was replaced as manager on May 17, 1951, by Irvin Fortune. On July 5, 1951. Fortune was replaced as manager by Bill Brightwell, who finished the season.

Enterprise played their final minor league season in 1952, with the franchise relocating during the Alabama–Florida League season. On July 5, 1952, the franchise relocated to Graceville, Florida, becoming the Graceville Oilers. The combined Enterprise/Graceville team finished last in the final standings. With an overall record of 33–80, playing under managers Shorty Marshall and Red Glover, the team ended their 1952 season 43½ games behind the first place Ozark Eagles in the Alabama–Florida League standings.

The Graceville Oilers continued as members of the Alabama–Florida League in the 1953 season and Enterprise did not field a team. Enterprise, Alabama has not hosted another minor league team.

== The ballpark ==
The Enterprise Boll Weevils minor league teams played home minor league games at Peanut Stadium. The ballpark was located at Ouida Street & Mill Avenue in Enterprise, Alabama.

== Timeline ==
Year(s)	# Yrs.	Team	Level	League	Ballpark
1936	1	Enterprise Browns	Class D	Alabama-Florida League	Peanut Stadium
1947–1950	3	Enterprise Boll Weevils	Class D	Arkansas State League	Peanut Stadium
1951–1952	2	Enterprise Boll Weevils	Class D	Alabama-Florida League	Peanut Stadium

== Year–by–year records ==
Year	Record	Finish	Manager	Playoffs/Notes
1936	64–46	2nd	Shovel Hodge / Vic Walker	Lost in 2nd round
1947	77–61	3rd	Ben Catchings	Lost in 1st round
1948	57–67	6th	Dolly Lambert / Richard Bixby	Did not qualify
1949	63–61	3rd	Russell Taylor	Lost in 1st round
1950	76–49	1st	Paul O'Dea	Won pennant Lost in 1st round
1951	44–76	5th	Dick Hahn (5/11) / James Guinn (5/17) / Irvin Fortune (7/5) / Bill Brightwell	Did not qualify
1952	33–80	6th	Shorty Marshall / Red Glover	Team moved to Graceville July 5

== Notable alumni ==
- Jim Carlin (1936)
- Dick Hahn (1951, MGR)
- Paul O'Dea (1950, MGR)
- Don Plarski (1948–1950)
- Earl Reid (1936)
- Tony Roig (1949)
- Enterprise Boll Weevils players
- Enterprise Browns players
