= Troy Trojans (Alabama minor league) =

- 1936–1947; (1936–1941, 1946–1949); Troy, Alabama

Minor league affiliations
- Class: Class D (1936–1941, 1946–1949)
- League: Alabama–Florida League (1936–1939); Alabama State League (1940–1941, 1946–1949)

Major league affiliations
- Team: Cleveland Indians (1939); Cincinnati Reds (1940); Brooklyn Dodgers (1941); Detroit Tigers (1947–1949)

Minor league titles
- League titles (2): 1938; 1948
- Conference titles (2): 1936; 1948
- Wild card berths (1): 1938; 1940

Team data
- Name: Troy Trojans (1936–1940); Troy Dodgers (1941); Troy Trojans (1946–1947); Troy Tigers (1948–1949)
- Ballpark: Trojan Field (1936–1941, 1946–1949)

The Troy Trojans were a minor league baseball team based in Troy, Alabama. Between 1936 and 1949, Troy teams played as members of the Alabama State League and its predecessor the Alabama–Florida League, winning two league championships and two league pennants.

The Troy Trojans teams hosted their minor league home games at Trojan Field in Troy, Alabama, which is still use today as Riddle–Pace Field on the campus of Troy University.

Troy teams played as a minor league affiliate of the Cleveland Indians (1939), Cincinnati Reds (1940), Brooklyn Dodgers (1941) and Detroit Tigers (1947–1949)

== History ==
=== 1936: Charter members Alabama-Florida League ===
The Troy "Trojans" amateur team played in the 1935 season as members of the Dixie Amateur League. The Trojans captured the league title, managed by Tilden "Happy" Campbell. When the professional franchise was formed, Campbell was in line remain as manager of the Troy team in 1936. But he resigned before the season began to focus entirely on his position as the coach of the Alabama Crimson Tide baseball team at the University of Alabama. Tilden was also serving an assistant coach for the Alabama Crimson Tide football team at the time. Tilden coached the Alabama Crimson Tide baseball team from 1935 to 1962, with a hiatus for his time in military service during World War II. While still coaching baseball at Alabama, Tilden died on February 23, 1963, of a heart attack.

A future major league player, catcher Fred Walters played for Troy and manager Happy Campbell on the 1935 team. Walters played for the Trojans amateur team while a student at Mississippi State University.

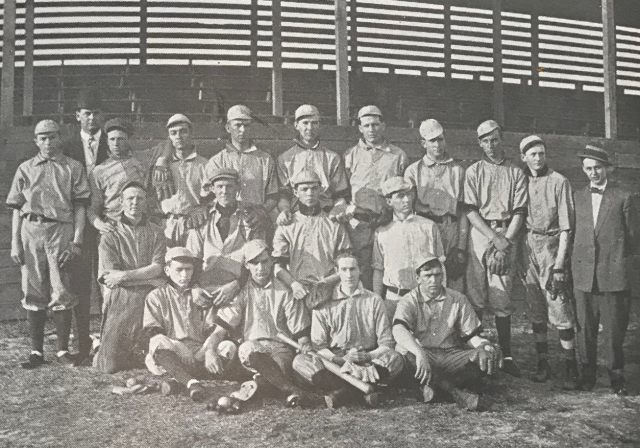
(1912) Troy Normal School baseball team. The minor league team was called the "Trojans". Today's Troy University adopted the "Trojans" nickname om 1973, after being known as the "Red Wave" beginning in 1931.

In 1936, the professional Alabama–Florida League was formed as a minor league to begin play that season. George M. Grant had previously been the president of the Dixie Amateur League. Grant then became the Alabama–Florida League president. The new professional league was so named as it featured seven teams based in Alabama cities, and a Panama City, Florida based team. Grant had been a key organizer of the new league and had hosted meetings in Troy that lead to the formation of the league. It was noted that many Troy baseball supporters were initially opposed to professional baseball, after their team's successes without a professional league. Grant was an attorney in Troy, Alabama and later became a politician.

Minor league baseball in Troy, Alabama began in the 1936 season when the new league was officially formed. The Troy Trojans became charter members of the eight–team Class D level Alabama–Florida League. The Abbeville Red Sox, Andalusia Reds, Dothan Boll Weevils, Enterprise Browns, Ozark Cardinals, Panama City Papermakers and Union Springs Springers teams joined the Troy Trojans as the first members of the new league. The Alabama-Florida League schedule had opening day play on May 12, 1936.

The Troy franchise use of the "Trojans" nickname ties to modern local tradition and history. In world history, the Trojan War was waged around the 1,200 or 1,300 century BC. and pitted the Ancient Greeks against the ancient city of Troy after Paris of Troy took Helen of Troy from her husband Menelaus, the King of Sparta. Troy, Alabama is the home of Troy University, established in 1887. Today, the mascot of the university and its sports teams is the Trojan, first used by the minor league team and later adopted by the university in 1973.

The minor league Trojan team began play at the site known today as Riddle–Pace Field, located on the campus of Troy University. The college first began baseball play in 1911, when the college was named the Troy Normal School. In the era of the minor league team playing on campus, the Troy University teams were known as the "Red Wave."

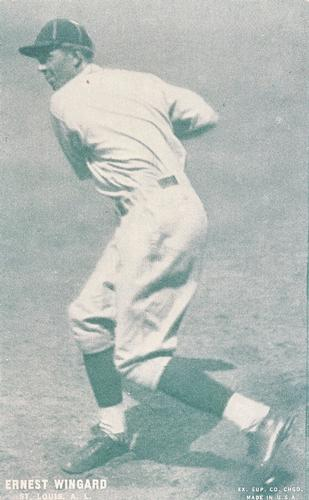
(1927) Ernie Wingard, St. Louis Browns. Wingard was the player/manager for the 1936 Troy Trojans as the team won the Alabama–Florida League pennant.

After the resignation of Tilden Campbell before the 1936 season began, Ernie Wingard joined Troy, becoming the Trojans' player/manager. It was his first season as a manager at age 35. The prior season, Wingard had been a player for the Milwaukee Brewers and Indianapolis Indians, batting .290 in 1935. From 1924 to 1927, Wingard had played in the major leagues with the St. Louis Browns as a pitcher. He compiled a 29-43 record with a 4.64 ERA in the major leagues. Wingard was nicknamed "Doc" and had a baseball career that spanned 30 years. As a major league pitcher, Wingard gave up five home runs to Babe Ruth. After playing baseball at the University of Alabama in 1920 and 1921 Wingard played for a semi-professional team in Bastrop, Louisiana. While playing there, he met Shoeless Joe Jackson who became a friend and mentor to Wingard, even traveling with Wingard during his rookie major league season in 1924. After his time as a pitcher diminished, Wingard became a strong minor league hitter.

In their first season of play, the Troy Trojans won the 1936 Alabama–Florida League pennant. With a record of 66–42, playing under manager Ernie Wingard, the Trojans placed first in the overall season standings and finished 5½ games ahead of the second place Enterprise Browns in the final regular season standings. The Alabama–Florida League played a split season schedule and the Troy Trojans won both halves of the season. Such an occurrence in a split season schedule usually eliminated a playoff being held because the two split season schedule winning teams would meet in a final series. As a playoff final wasn't needed due to Troy's two regular season titles, a unique playoff plan was created. The six remaining league teams (Abbeville having withdrawn) had a one game playoff rotation, with the winner of those playoffs set to meet Troy in a championship series.

After the six-team Alabama–Florida League playoffs, Troy received their bye until the finals, and the Andalusia Reds became their opponent. In the playoff finals, the Andalusia Reds defeated the Trojans 4 games to 2 to win the league playoff structure. 2,000 fans were in attendance at the final game of the championship series which Andalusia won, 6–2. Although Andalusia won the series, because of their two regular season titles, Troy was considered the league champion.

Playing for the Trojans at age 24, Brick Owens batted .378 for the season and won the Alabama–Florida League batting title. He also led the league with 110 runs scored. Owens added 4 home runs and 54 RBIs in 94 games for the Trojans in 1936. Owens would play four more seasons for Troy before leaving baseball. Ownes' teammate, Troy catcher William Casey led the league with 151 total hits on the season. Overall, Casey batted .348 with 6 home runs and 76 RBIs in 106 games. Playing for Troy as a left-handed first baseman, outfielder and pitcher, Ernie Wingard appeared in 104 games for Troy in his player/manager role. As a hitter, Wingard batted .328 with 14 home runs and 90 RBIs. As a pitcher, he had an 8-3 record with a 2.48 ERA in 14 games and 102 innings with 2 shutouts.

=== 1937 to 1939: Alabama-Florida League / 1938 championship ===
In his first managerial role, Charlie Moss became the Troy player/manager in 1937. At age 26, Moss joined Troy after playing in the majors for the entirety of the prior three seasons. His 1937 season with Troy was his first minor league season in any role. After attending the University of Mississippi and playing collegiate baseball, Moss went directly to the major leagues from college. He played as a catcher with the Philadelphia Athletics from 1934 to 1936. Moss batted .246 with 0 home runs in 47 total career games and 65 total at-bats for the Athletics. He did not play in the minor leagues prior to joining Philadelphia in 1934.

Continuing play in the 1937 Alabama–Florida League, the Troy Trojans advanced to the finals of the league playoffs. The Alabama–Florida League reduced to a six-team league for the 1937 season, as the Abbeville Red Sox and Enterprise Browns teams did not return for the second season of the league. The 1937 Troy team was also informally called the "Cotton Bolls." The Trojans ended the Alabama State League regular season with a 70–56 record, playing under player/manager Charlie Moss and placed second in the standings. Troy finished 8½ games behind the first place Union Springs Springers in the overall Alabama–Florida League regular season standings. Finishing in third place in the overall standings, the Andalusia Bulldogs won the first half title in the split season schedule and the Union Springs Springers won the second half title. The playoff structure was scheduled to include Troy. The league gave Troy a bye to meet the winner of the Andalusia vs. Union Springs series. In their separate playoff, Andalusia defeated Union Springs 4 games to 2 to advance and meet Troy. In the finals, the Andalusia Bulldogs won the championship, defeating Troy 4 games to 2.

Playing at age 21, Trojan outfielder Andy Skurski batted .327 with 11 home runs and 107 RBIs on the season. He went on to play in the minor leagues through the 1954 season. Troy player/manager Charlie Moss batted .306 with 5 home runs and 65 RBIs for the Trojans in his dual rold.

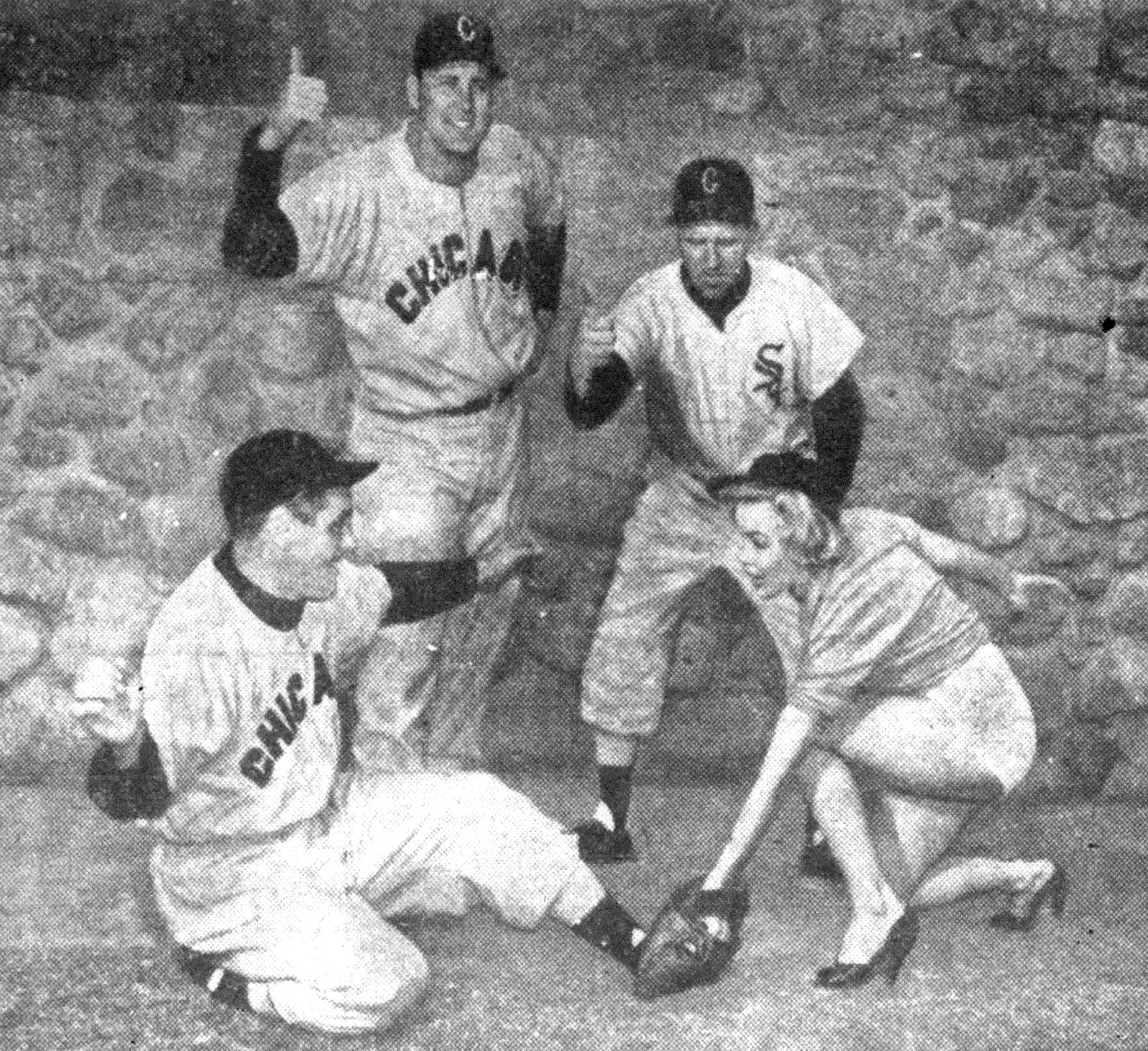
(1951) Chicago White Sox players Hank Majeski (far left), Gus Zernial (center left) and Joe Dobson (center right) and actress Marilyn Monroe (far right). A future major league All-star, Dodson pitched for Troy in 1937.

Righthander Joe Dobson pitched for Troy in 1937, compiling a 19–12 record, a 2.27 ERA in 39 games and 270 innings. Dodson had 26 complete games to lead the Alabama–Florida League. The season prior, in 1936, Dodson had been seen pitching well for the semipro Tucson Merchants team at the July 1936 Arizona state tournament. At the tournament in Phoenix, Arizona he was discovered by Cleveland Indians scout, Grover Land who eventually signed Dodson to a professional contract. The Indians assigned him to play for Troy, beginning his professional career in 1937. The youngest of 14 children, Dobson had lost his left thumb and forefinger in an accident with dynamite at 9 years of age. After his successful season with Troy to begin his career, Dodson went on to become a major league All-star, winning 137 (137–103) career games pitching for the Cleveland Indians (1939–1940), Boston Red Sox (1941–1943; 1946–1950; 1954) and Chicago White Sox (1951–1953). Following his pitching career, Dobson became the pitching coach for the Boston Red Sox in 1954. In 1972, he became the general manager for the Winter Haven Red Sox of the Florida State League. Dodson was inducted into the Boston Red Sox Hall of Fame in 2012.

In 1938, Charlie Moss left Troy and rejoined the Philadelphia Athletics organization, becoming the player/manager of the Federalsburg A's of the Class D level Eastern Shore League. Moss left professional baseball following the 1939 season. A native of Meridian, Mississippi, where he was born in 1911 and died in 1991, Moss owned and lived in an area of Meridian called Moss Canyon. There, he built a baseball field directly behind his home for the youth in the neighborhood to play on. The ballpark he constructed also hosted organized youth games.

Charlie Hilcher replaced Charlie Moss as the Troy player/manager to begin the 1938 season. During the season, Tilden Campbell and Trojans pitcher Gene Babbitt also managed the team. With the three different managers, the Troy Trojans captured the Alabama–Florida League title.

The Troy Trojans won the league title in the 1938 Alabama-Florida League as the league continued play as the six-team Class D level league but abandoned the split season schedule format. The league adopted a four-team playoff structure. The Trojans placed second in the six–team Alabama–Florida League final standings and qualified for the playoffs to begin their title run. With an overall record of 71–59, playing under their three managers, Troy ended their season 6.0 games behind the first place Dothan Browns in the league standings. In the four–team playoffs, Troy first defeated the Union Springs Redbirds 3 games to 1 to advance. In the finals, Troy defeated the Andalusia Bulldogs with pitcher Virgil Trucks 4 games to 2 to win the title.

Notably, the Alabama–Florida League was dominated in 1938 by Andalusia pitcher Virgil Trucks. Trucks compiled a then-record of 418 total strikeouts on the season. Trucks pitched 273 innings during the Alabama-Florida League regular season while compiling a 25–6 record for the Bulldogs. Trucks struck out 15 Trojan batters in a late season game against Troy to surpass 400 for the season. Trucks later struck out an additional 30 batters in his two playoff starts for Andalusia. Playing at Troy in the August 21, 1938, game Trucks and his Andalusia team won the contest by the score of 3–0. His 15 strikeouts against the Trojans that day gave Trucks 413 total strikeouts to that point of the season, setting a new professional baseball record. He later added five more strikeouts in his final appearance of the regular season.

Playing in the outfield and at shortstop, Brick Owens continued his tenure with Troy and batted .345 with a .416 OPS and 47 stolen bases for the Trojans in their championship season. If was his third of four seasons playing with Troy at age 26. Playing his first of three seasons for Troy age 19, second baseman William Hodgins batted .300 with a .400 OPS and scored 112 runs for the Trojans while playing in 112 games. Both player/manager Gene Babbitt (17–8) and pitcher Thomas Adams (17–5) won 17 games for Troy with 31 complete games combined.

Utilityman Dan Snell was in his third season playing for the Trojans in 1938. The championship season was his final season with Troy having first joined the organization in 1936. A second baseman, third baseman and outfielder, Snell batted .295 in 93 games for Troy in 1936 and batted .247 with 0 home runs and 88 RBIs in 1937. In the Trojans' championship season, Snell batted .261 for the 1938 Trojans. In 1939, Snell was hired as the head baseball coach at his alma mater Howard College (now Samford University). He was subsequently released by the Troy Trojans before the 1939 season began. Snell played minor league baseball through the 1942 season. A gifted athlete, he also played professional football for the Buffalo Indians of the American Football League in 1940. Snell began military service during World War II becoming a Sergeant in the U.S. Army. He was killed in action on March 11, 1945, in Bad Neuenahr-Ahrweiler, Germany.

In defending their Alabama–Florida League championship, the Troy Trojans became a minor league affiliate of the Cleveland Indians in 1939. Continuing play as members of the six-team league, the Trojans ended the season with a losing record of 62–68 to finish in fifth place, playing the season under player/manager Holt "Cat" Milner. Troy ended the regular season 13.0 games behind the first place Dothan Browns in the final standings. With their fifth-place finish, the Trojans did not qualify for the four-team league playoffs won by the Tallassee Indians.

Serving as player/manager at age 39, Milner had a strong season while playing first base for Troy in 1939. He batted .381 to win the Alabama–Florida League batting title. He also hit 12 home runs while playing in 112 games. Although he played in only 36 total games for the season, Troy's Harold Fehrenbacher batted .423 with 14 home runs in 142 at bats for the 1939 Trojans.

=== 1940: Alabama State League / Cincinnati Reds affiliate ===
With logistical changes, the Alabama–Florida League was renamed and became the Alabama State League for the 1940 season. The name change occurred after the Panama City, Florida based Panama City Pelicans team left the league and were replaced by Brewton, Alabama based Brewton Millers. With all the league teams based in Alabama, the newly named league began its season schedule on April 16, 1940. The Troy Trojans joined the Andalusia Rams, Brewton Millers, Dothan Browns, Greenville Lions (Brooklyn Dodgers affiliate) and the Tallassee Indians teams in the renamed league.

After the 1939 season, Cat Milner left Troy. He began a three-season tenure as the player/manager of the Alabama State League rival Dothan Browns in 1940. Milner would lead his Dothan team to consecutive championships in 1940 and 1941. He later returned to Dothan to lead the franchise to two additional league titles in 1948 and 1951.

Prior to the 1940 season, the Troy home ballpark was damaged by a tornado. Ellis Johnson had been hired by Troy to replace Cat Milner as the manager for the 1940 season. However, Johnson was fired from his position just before the 1940 season started. With the managerial position unfilled, Troy played their first three games of the season without an official team manager. Troy player Harold Fehrenbacher then became the Troy player/manager for the 1940 season at age 21. A catcher and outfielder, Fehrenbacher had played with Troy for the previous two seasons.

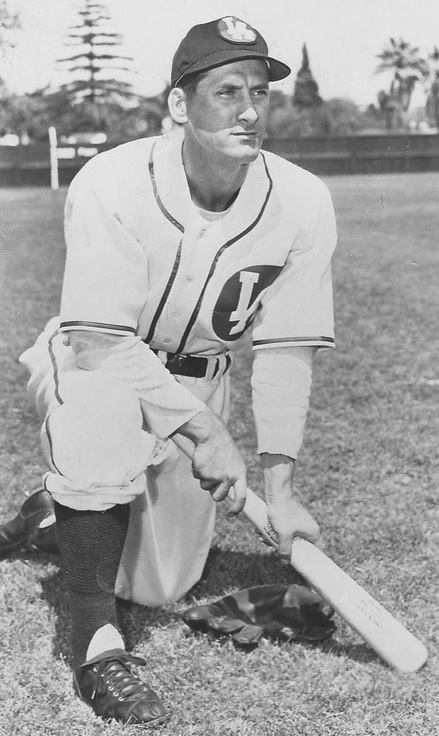
(1947) Johnny Ostrowski, Los Angeles Angels. Ostrowski batted .341 with 30 home runs and a league leading 120 RBIs in 112 games for the 1940 Troy Trojans.

The Troy Trojans became a Cincinnati Reds minor league affiliate in the 1940 Alabama State League season. Troy ended the Alabama State League regular season with a record of 66–63 and qualified for the four-team playoffs with a fourth place finish. Led by player/manager Harold Fehrenbacher, The Trojans finished 18.0 games behind Tallahassee Indians. In the playoffs, Troy lost in first round, defeated 3 games to 2 by the Greenville Lions. The Dothan Browns defeated Greenville in the final to win the Alabama State League title. Johnny Ostrowski of Troy led the Alabama State League with 120 RBIs on the season.

Playing the outfield for Troy, the 22-year-old Johnny Ostrowski had a big season in 1940, batting .341 with 30 home runs and 10 triples in 112 games for the Trojans. He was promoted to the Macon Peaches of the Class B level South Atlantic League, where he played in 11 games at the end the 1940 season. Ostrowski was signed by Brooklyn Dodgers out of Tilden High School in Chicago and played in 1939 for the Superior Blues in the Northern League before being assigned to Troy. He played in the major leagues with the Chicago Cubs (1943–1946), Boston Red Sox (1948), Chicago White Sox (1949–1950) and Washington Senators (1950), batting .241 with 14 career home runs in 216 games. Ostrowski became the first player born in Chicago, Illinois to play for both the Chicago Cubs and Chicago White Sox in his career.

The Trojans' player/manager Harold Fehrenbacher played in 112 games for Troy in 1940, and had a strong season, batting .326 with 10 home runs. Following his season as the Troy Trojans player/manager, Fehrenbacher left professional baseball at age 21. Eight years later, he returned to baseball for one final season in 1949, playing 100 games with the Geneva Red Birds. He never played professionally again. Harold W. Fehrenbacher married Patsy Williamson on June 18, 1951, in Clark County, Nevada.

=== 1941: Alabama State League / Relocation ===
The Troy franchise became a minor league affiliate of the Brooklyn Dodgers in 1941, with franchise adopting the parent club's nickname and becoming known as the Troy "Dodgers." The 1941 Alabama State League continued play as a six-team Class D level league.

Catcher Pudge Powers became the Troy player/manager for the 1941 season. Powers joined Troy having played the prior season for the Clarksdale Red Sox of the Cotton States League. At age 32, the Troy role was his first managerial position.

On July 31, 1941, the Troy Dodgers had complied a record of 37–50 to that date when the franchise moved to Tuskegee, Alabama. The team finished the Alabama State League season playing as the Tuskegee Airmen. Troy team owner D. G. O'Neill was faced with debt and the entire league was struggling with attendance due to a major drought in the region. O’Neill obtained approval from Alabama State League president Eric Ballard to move the Troy franchise to Tuskegee. O'Neill stressed publicly that the move to Tuskegee was just temporary and planned for the team to return to Troy the next season.

After compiling a record of 11–21 while based in Tuskegee, the team ended the 1941 season with an overall record of 48–71. Pudge Powers managed the team in both locations. While based in Tuskegee, the team played its home games at Vetegee Stadium. The Airmen team ended the season 31.0 games behind the Dothan Browns (79–40) in the final regular season standings. With their fifth-place finish, the Tuskegee team did not qualify for the four-team Alabama State League playoffs won again by Dothan. Player/manager Pudge Powers batted .302 with 2 home runs while appearing in 102 games for the team.

The Alabama State League did not return to play in 1942. As with many minor leagues, the Alabama State League became dormant and did not play from 1942 through 1945 due to World War II. More than 2,000 minor league baseball players (and over 500 major league players) went into military service in the armed forces during the War.

=== 1946: Alabama State League reforms ===
Following the conclusion of World War II, the Alabama State League reformed for the 1946 season. The league resumed play as a six-team, Class D level league with Troy as a member, returning to the "Trojans" nickname. Tuskegee, Alabama did not field a team. With the league beginning scheduled play on April 23, 1946, Troy joined with the Brewton Millers (Chicago White Sox affiliate), Dothan Browns, Geneva Red Birds (Boston Red Sox), Greenville Lions and Ozark Eagles teams in the six-team league.

An outfielder, veteran Norman DeWeese joined Troy as the Trojans' player/manager at age 32. DeWeese had played the previous season for the 1945 Oakland Oaks of the Pacific Coast League, batting .319 for Oakland before a severe knee injury ended his season.

In returning to play, the Troy Trojans ended the 1946 Alabama State League regular season with a record of 60–68, finishing in fifth place under manager Norman DeWeese. The Trojans finished 11.0 games behind the first place Dothan Browns in the final regular season standings. With their fifth-place finish, Troy did not qualify for the four-team playoffs, which were won by the Geneva Red Birds.

After a three-season hiatus from baseball due to military service, Troy outfielder Emil Bozich won the Alabama State League batting title, hitting .355 on the season. He also had a league leading 178 total hits for the season. At 25 years old and in his second professional season, Bozich added 6 home runs and 97 RBIs, an .891 OPS for Troy with 16 stolen bases in 119 games. The 1946 season was Bozich's first since he played the 1942 season as a rookie with the Burlington Bees before his hiatus while fulfilling his service in the U.S. Army during World War II. After his strong season in 1946, Bozich returned to play for Troy in 1947 in what became his final season in professional baseball. Bozich worked in Ankeny, Iowa for John Deere as an inspector following his baseball career. Bozich and his wife Georgia managed the Iowa Theater in their hometown of Madrid, Iowa.

Trojan outfielder and pitcher Bob Benish had a standout season in 1946. Benish batted .354 for Troy with 14 home runs and 103 RBIs on the season. Playing a dual role, he also pitched to a 6-2 record while appearing in 9 games on the mound for the Trojans.

=== 1947 to 1949: Alabama State League ===
Leaving Troy, Norman DeWeese became the player/manager of the Riverside Dons of the Sunset League in 1947. It was his final season in professional baseball. DeWeese had severely injured his knee while playing for Oakland in 1945 and was never able to play regularly again. Replacing DeWeese, Bob Benish continued his tenure with Troy, becoming the Trojans' player/manager for the 1947 season. It was his first managerial position at age 26.

The Troy Trojans continued Alabama State League play and the franchise became a minor league affiliate of the Detroit Tigers beginning in 1947. The Class D level Alabama State League expanded to become an eight-team league for the 1947 season. The Andalusia Arrows and Enterprise Boll Weevils teams joined the league as the new expansion teams. The Troy Trojans had a poor season in 1947, compiling a record of 58–80 to finish in seventh place in the eight-team league. Playing the season under player/manager Bob Benish, the Trojans ended the regular season 32.0 games behind the first place Greenville Lions. Troy did not qualify for the four-team playoffs, which were won by Greenville. Playing first base in the field, Bob Benish batted .287 for Troy with 8 home runs and 100 RBIs in 126 games. He also pitched to an 11-7 record with a 4.37 ERA appearing in 23 games with 14 complete games.

Outfielder Emil Bozich returned to Troy in 1947 after winning the league batting title in the prior season. Playing his final season in professional baseball, Bozich batted .328 with 6 home runs, 83 RBIs and a .372 OBP in 115 games.

Continuing as a Detroit Tigers affiliate in 1948, the team became known as the Troy "Tigers" en route to winning the league Alabama State League regular season pennant. The Tigers ended the 1948 Alabama State League season with a record of 83–41, ending the regular season in first place. Player/manager Bob Benish returned for his third and season with Troy. Troy won regular season pennant, finishing 4.0 games ahead of the second place Greenville Pirates. In the four-team playoffs, Troy lost in the first round, 4 games to 2 to the eventual league champion Dothan Browns, who were managed by Cat Milner. Troy pitcher Richard Gilkerson led the Alabama State League with a 1.69 ERA on the season. Player/manager Bob Benish batted .260 for Troy with 5 home runs and 73 RBIs in just 75 games. He did not pitch in 1948. It was his final season with the Troy team.

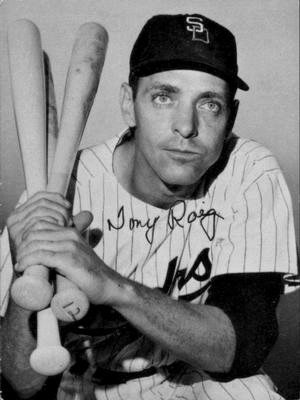
(1961) Tony Roig, San Diego Paders. Roig began his lengthy professional baseball career as a pitcher for Troy in 1948.

Tony Roig, a future major league infielder, played for the Troy Tigers in 1948. Roig appeared in 16 games for Troy as a pitcher at age 19, while hitting .286 as a hitter in his pitching appearances. He never pitched professionally again. Roig injured his pitching arm and became a hitter. In 1951 and 1952 he stepped away from minor league baseball and enlisted in the U.S. Army during the Korean War. Roig played in parts of three major league seasons with the Washington Senators (1953, 1955–1956), batting .212 with 0 home runs in 76 games. Playing in Japan from 1963 to 1968, Roig hit 126 home runs with the Nishitetsu Lions and Kintetsu Buffaloes of the Pacific League. Roig had a lengthy career in baseball. After buying a lumberyard in Spokane, Washington, he served as a scout for the Milwaukee Brewers, California Angels and Philadelphia Phillies beginning in 1973. In 1975 and 1976 he managed the Milwaukee Brewers affiliate Newark Co-Pilots in the New York-Penn League, leading the 1975 Newark team to the league championship. He scouted and worked as a minor league instructor through 1994.

After three seasons with the club, Bob Benish left Troy and became the player/manager of the Helena Seaporters of the Class C level Cotton States League in 1949. He was replaced as manager in Troy by Holt "Cat" Milner, who returned for his second stint as the Troy manager at age 49 after leading Dothan to the league title.

In what proved to be their final season, the Troy Tigers continued play as a minor league affiliate of the Detroit Tigers in the 1949 Alabama State League. The league played its 1949 season continuing as a Class D level eight-team league. Continuing as a Detroit Tigers minor league affiliate and keeping the nickname of their Detroit parent affiliate, the Troy Tigers finished in last place. With a record of 49–75, Troy finished in eighth place playing the season under manager Cat Milner, who had returned for a second tenure with the team. The Tigers finished 32½ games behind the first place Greenville Pirates in the final regular season standings. With their eighth place finish, Troy did not qualify for the four-team Alabama State League playoffs, won by the Andalusia Arrows. Troy had been second in the league in attendance during their pennant winning season the year prior, drawing 40,242. Troy then fell to a distant last in league attendance in 1949, drawing 18,323 for the Alabama State League season.

The Troy franchise permanently folded following the 1949 season. Troy was replaced in the eight-team, 1950 Alabama State League by the unaffiliated Headland, Alabama based Headland Dixie Runners franchise. Troy, Alabama has not hosted another minor league team. The Alabama State League returned to being called the Alabama–Florida League following the 1950 season. The Alabama–Florida League permanently folded following the 1962 season.

== The ballpark ==
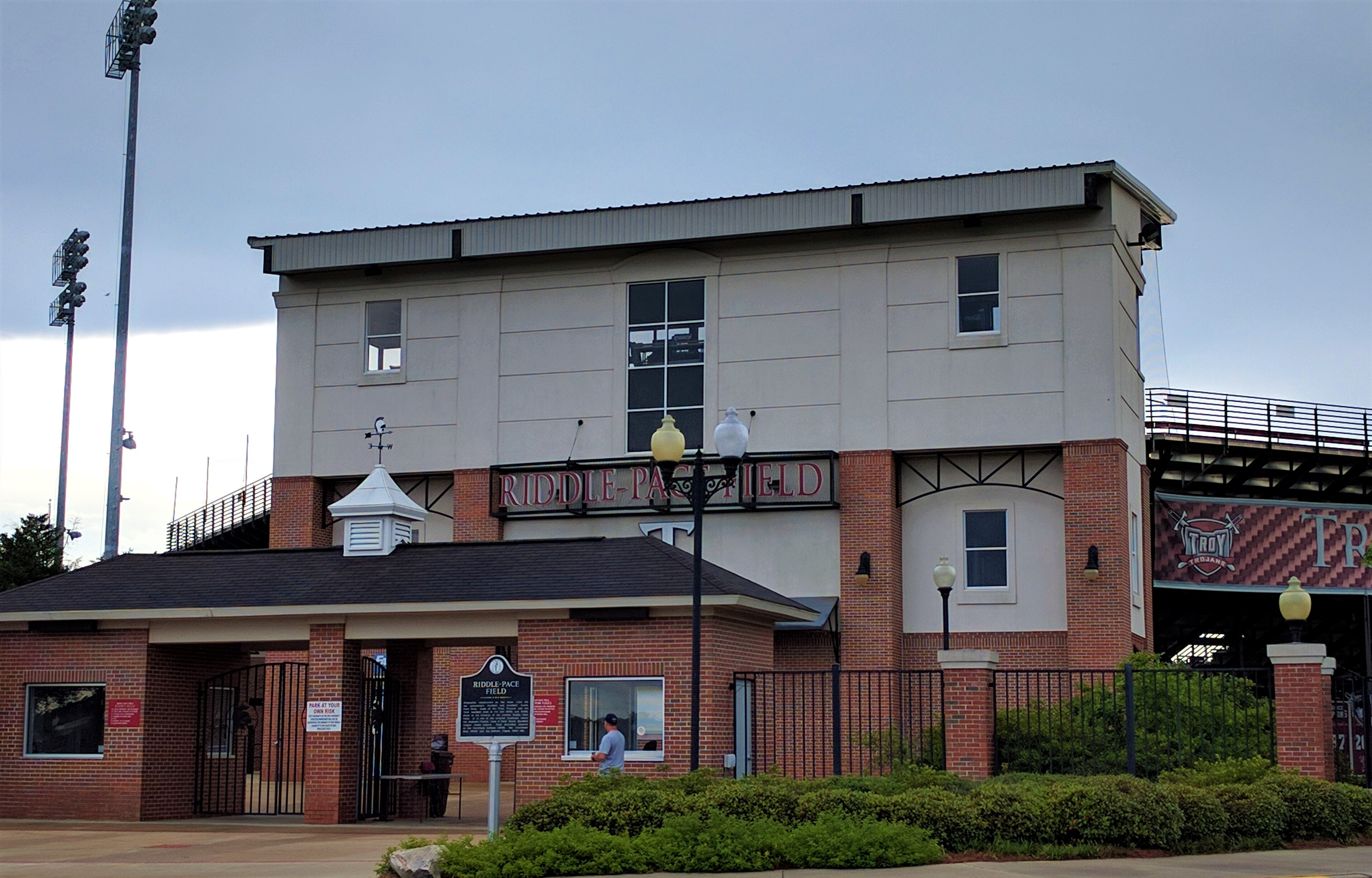
(2017) Riddle-Pace Field, Troy University, Troy, Alabama. Originally built in 1931 on the college campus, the ballpark site was also home to the Troy minor league teams.

The Troy teams hosted home minor league home games at what was called "Trojan Field" for the minor league team. Riddle–Pace Field was built in 1931 on the campus of Troy University to house its football and baseball teams. The site was originally named Pace Field in honor of former mathematics professor Matthew Downer Pace.

At the time that the Troy minor league team played, the college sports teams were nicknamed as the "Red Wave." The ballpark was the home of all the Troy minor league teams, with the college sharing the ballpark with the professional team. Riddle-Pace Field received 12-million dollars for facility improvements and upgrades in 2022.

Today, there is an Alabama Historical Marker on display at the ballpark, near the main entrance. The inscription reads:
"Originally constructed as the home field for the university’s football and baseball teams. Pace Field, home of the Troy Trojans and the Troy baseball team in the late 1930s and 1940s, stood at the location of the current Riddle - Pace Field. It is one of the original locations where the Alabama-Florida Class D Deep South Baseball League teams played. They provided players to the Cleveland Indians (1939), the Cincinnati Reds (1940) and the Detroit Tigers (1947-49)."

== Timeline ==
Year(s)	# Yrs.	Team	Level	League	Affiliate	Ballpark
1936–1938	3	Troy Trojans	Class D	Alabama–Florida League	None	Trojan Field
1939	1	Troy Trojans	Class D	Alabama–Florida League	Cleveland Indians	Trojan Field
1940	1	Troy Trojans	Class D	Alabama State League	Cincinnati Reds	Trojan Field
1941	1	Troy Dodgers	Class D	Alabama State League	Brooklyn Dodgers	Trojan Field
1946	1	Troy Trojans	Class D	Alabama State League	None	Trojan Field
1947	1	Troy Trojans	Class D	Alabama State League	Detroit Tigers	Trojan Field
1948–1949	2	Troy Tigers	Class D	Alabama State League	Detroit Tigers	Trojan Field

== Year–by–year records ==
Year	Record	Finish	Manager	Playoffs/Notes
1936	68–42	1st	Ernie Wingard	Won pennant Lost in finals
1937	70–56	2nd	Charlie Moss	Did not qualify
1938	71–59	2nd	Charley Hilcher	League champions
1939	62–68	5th	Holt Cat Milner	Did not qualify
1940	66–63	4th	Ellis Johnson; Harold Fehrenbacher	Lost in 1st round
1941	48–71	5th	Pudge Powers	Troy (37–50) moved to Tuskegee July 31
1946	60–68	5th	Norman DeWeese	Did not qualify
1947	58–80	7th	Bob Benish	Did not qualify
1948	83–41	1st	Bob Benish	Won pennant Lost in 1st round
1949	49–75	8th	Cat Milner	Did not qualify

== Notable alumni ==
- Tilden Campbell (1935-1936*, 1938, MGR)
- Joe Dobson (1937) MLB All-star
- Ellis Johnson (1940, MGR)
- Charlie Moss (1937, MGR)
- Johnny Ostrowski (1940)
- Tony Roig (1948)
- Fred Walters (1935)
- Ernie Wingard (1936, MGR)

== See also ==
- Category:Troy Trojans (Alabama) players
- Category:Troy Tigers players
- List of NCAA Division I baseball venues
