= Greenville Lions (baseball) =

Greenville Pirates
- 1939–1950; (1939–1941, 1946–1950); Greenville, Alabama

Minor league affiliations
- Previous classes: Class D
- League: Alabama State League (1940–1941, 1946–1950)
- Previous leagues: Alabama–Florida League (1939)

Major league affiliations
- Previous teams: Pittsburgh Pirates (1948–1950); Brooklyn Dodgers (1940); Chicago White Sox (1939)

Minor league titles
- League titles: 1 (1947)

Team data
- Previous names: Greenville Pirates (1948–1950); Greenville Lions (1939–1941, 1946–1947)
- Previous parks: Greenville Stadium

The Greenville Lions were a minor league baseball team that existed from 1939 to 1941 and from 1946 to 1950. They played in the Alabama–Florida League in 1939, and in the Alabama State League for the rest of their existence. In 1939, they were affiliated with the Chicago White Sox, in 1940 they were affiliated with the Brooklyn Dodgers and from 1948 to 1950 with the Pittsburgh Pirates. They were based in Greenville, Alabama. Their home games were played at Greenville Stadium The team was known as the Greenville Pirates during their final years of existence.

== Year-by-year record ==
Year	Record	Finish	Manager	Playoffs
1939	44-85	6th	Paul Kardow	
1940	71-59	2nd	Dick Luckey	Won 1st round vs. Troy Trojans (3 games to 2); Lost League Finals vs. Dothan Browns (4 games to 2)
1941	45-72	6th	Ernie Wingard / Herb Thomas	
1946	67-62	3rd	Dan Miller / William Anderson	Won 1st round vs. Dothan Browns (3 games to 1); Lost League Finals vs. Geneva Red Birds (3 games to 1)
1947	90-48	1st	Sam Demma	Won 1st round vs. Enterprise Boll Weevils (4 games to 3); League Champs vs. Brewton Millers (4 games to 3)
1948	80-46	2nd	Walt Tauscher	Won 1st round vs. Ozark Eagles (4 games to 3); Lost League Finals vs. Dothan Browns (4 games to 0)
1949	83-44	1st	Walt Tauscher	Won 1st round vs. Enterprise Boll Weevils (4 games to 1); Lost League Finals vs. Andalusia Arrows (4 games to 1)
1950	65-61	4th	Mickey O'Neil	Lost in 1st round vs. Dothan Browns (4 games to 2)
