= Riddle–Pace Field =

Baseball venue in Troy, Alabama, US

Riddle-Pace Field
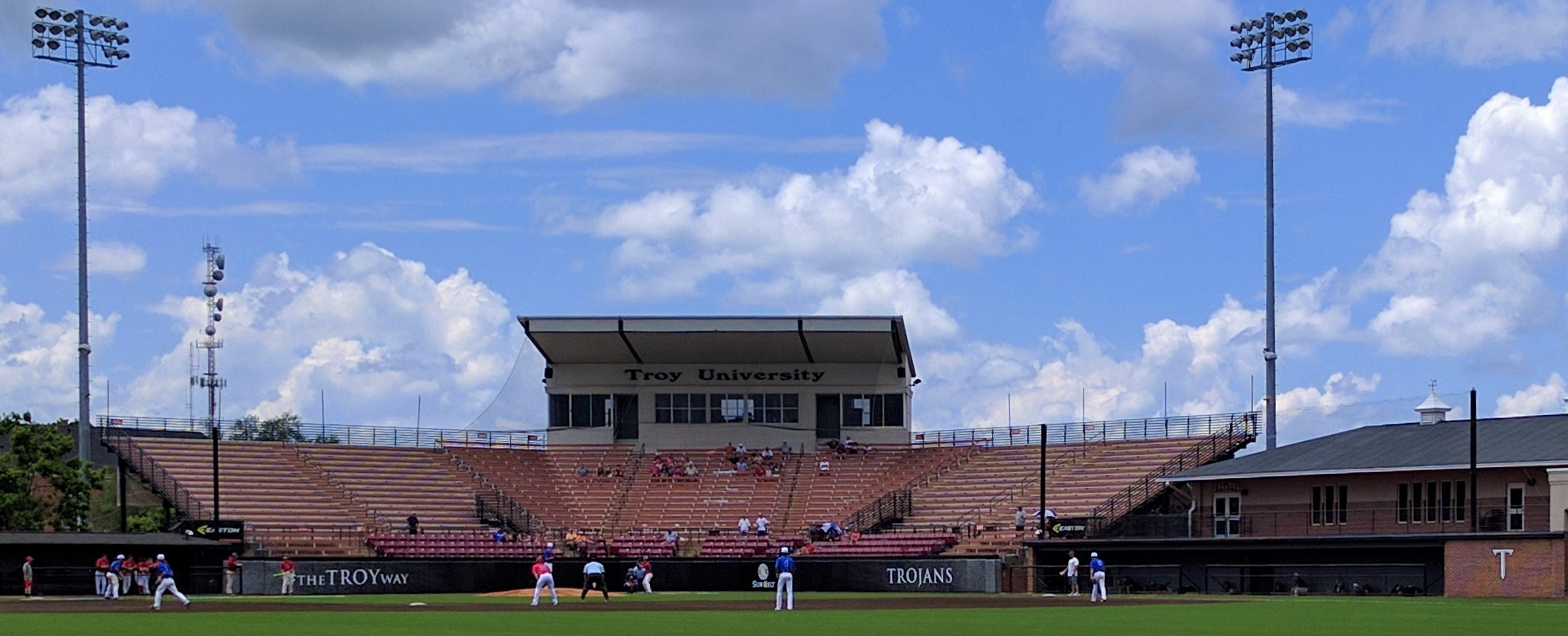
- Interactive map of Riddle-Pace Field
- Location: Luther Drive, Troy, Alabama 36082
- Coordinates: 31.798899°N 85.953362°W
- Owner: Troy University
- Operator: Troy University
- Seating type: Chairback, bench
- Capacity: 2,500
- Surface: ProGrass
- Scoreboard: Daktronics Full-LED video board Daktronics BA-2009 LED scoreboard
- Record attendance: 7,033 (June 6, 2026 vs. Little Rock)
- Field size: Left Field: 340 ft. Left Center: 375 ft. Center Field: 400 ft. Right Center: 350 ft. Right Field: 310 ft. Outfield Fence Height: 10 ft. "Monster" Height: 30 ft.

Construction
- Groundbreaking: 1931
- Opened: 1931
- Renovated: 2008
- General contractor: Whaley Construction Co.

Tenants
- Troy Trojans baseball (NCAA) (1931-Present); Troy Trojans) (1936-1940) (Alabama–Florida League); Troy Dodgers (1941); Troy Trojans (1946-1947) (Alabama State League); Troy Tigers (1948-1949)

Riddle–Pace Field is a baseball venue in Troy, Alabama, United States, home to the Troy Trojans baseball team. The grandstand seating capacity is 2,500. The venue features an outfield viewing area for tailgaters, a patio area for fans above the home dugout, and a large black wall with a video board and score board system. The wall has become known as the "Monster".

== History ==
The current field known as Riddle–Pace Field was open for play in 1931. Before 1931, all Troy home baseball games were played in a small field-like area known as the Shackelford Quad in front of Shackelford Hall. The change in venue was due to the number of windows being broken in Shackelford Hall while baseball games were going on.

Upon the field being moved to its current location in 1931, the venue was named Pace Field, named after Matthew Downer Pace, who had served for many decades at Troy as a professor and later as the college's president from 1936 to 1937. After many renovations and additions, the field became known as Riddle–Pace Field, with the new name addition being named after Chase Riddle, who coached the Troy baseball program from 1979–1990, winning five conference titles and two national championships. He finished with a record of 436-147-2 (.747) while at Troy.

== Features ==
The field was heavily renovated in 1991 when the infield was dug up, leveled, and rebuilt with new sod and a complete state-of-the-art irrigation system.

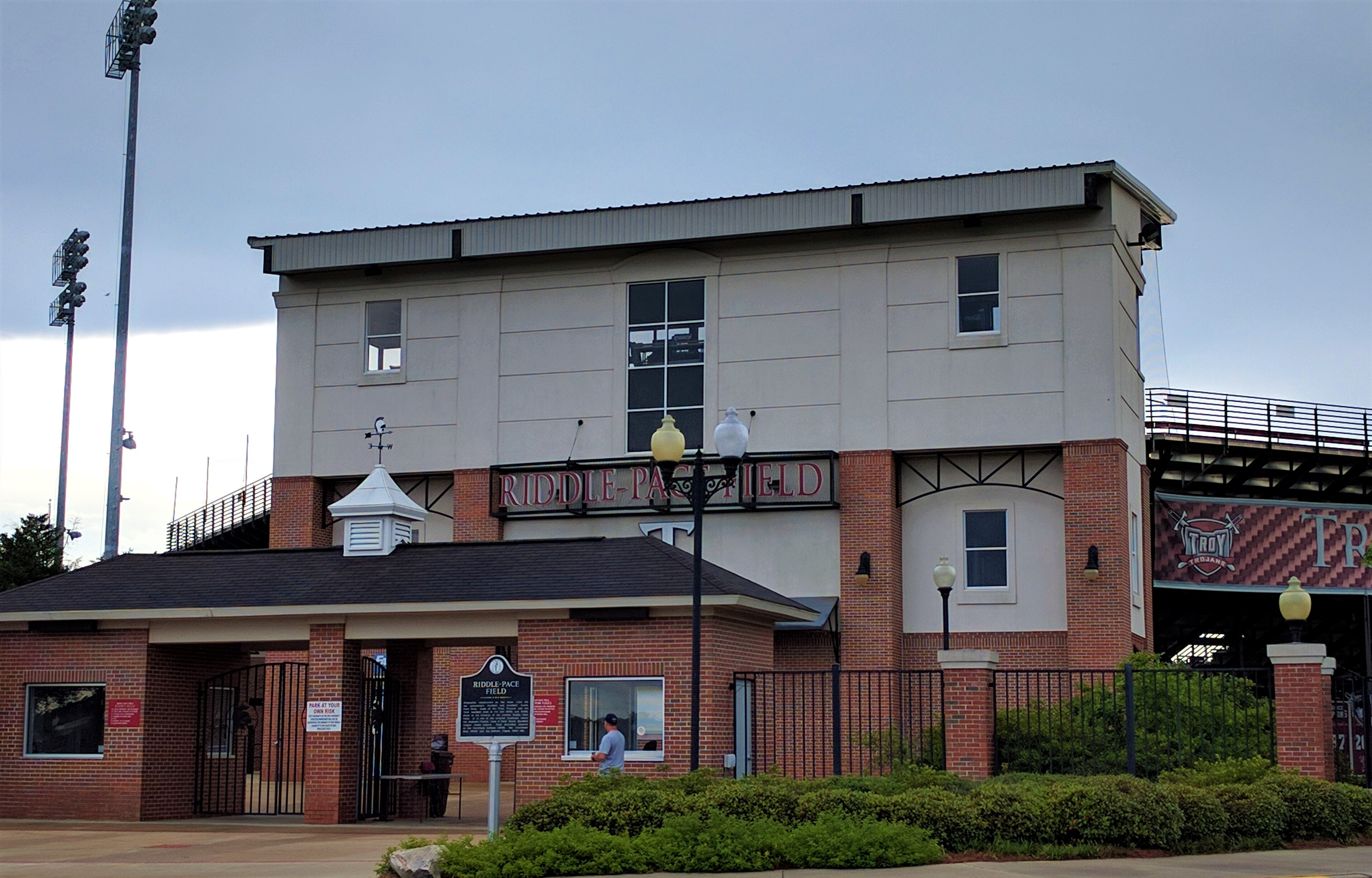
Riddle-Pace Field entrance at Troy University.

In 2002, the stadium was renovated by adding a new brick plaza at the entrance and a new 2,000 seat grandstand with chair-back and bench-back seating in the center and lower sections of the grandstand. A new three-story press box tower was also built.

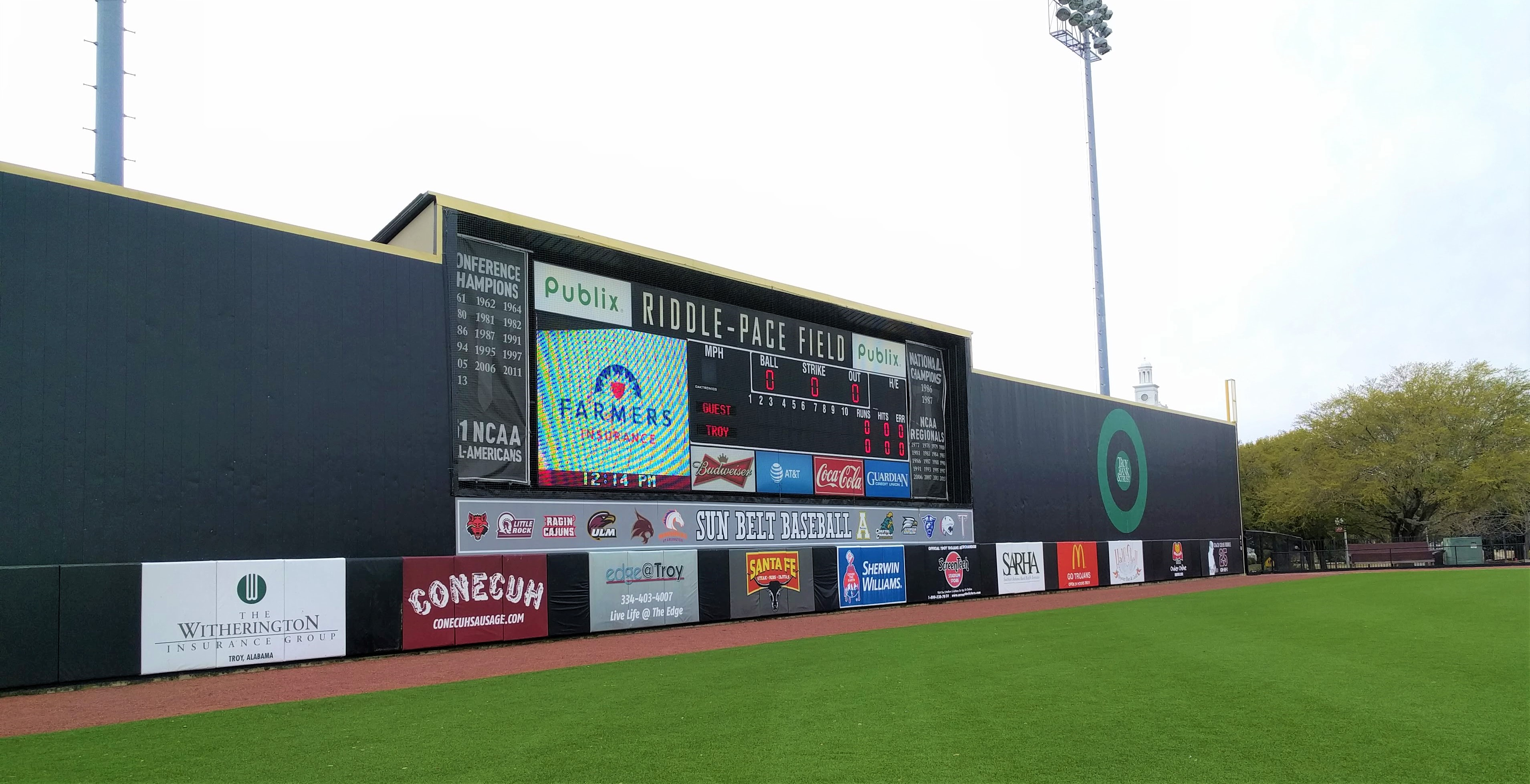
The "Monster" Wall and video board.

In 2008, Riddle–Pace Field went through yet another renovation. The $4.7 million renovation helped Troy meet NCAA Regional hosting requirements, as well as expanding TV broadcasting abilities. Home plate was moved up 8 feet. Left field was extended to 340 feet and center was extended to 400 feet. The length of right field stayed the same at 310 feet, but a 27-foot wall with a built-in scoreboard and HD video-replay screen replaced what was previously an 8-foot wall. The original grass and dirt turf was replaced with ProGrass artificial turf, although the pitcher's mound and track in the foul territories are still made of dirt. A two-story building called the Lott Complex was built along the left field line that houses offices, training rooms, video rooms and a players’ lounge, along with 42 major league-size lockers. The home dugout was extended in length and was connected to the new Lott Complex. The original stadium lighting was also replaced with Musco Sports Lighting. A media/television camera deck was also erected in center field for television purposes.

There are plans to add additional seating along the right field line, extend the visitor dugout and add more luxury suites in the future.

=== Doubles Alley ===
Doubles Alley is the name of the area of the outfield between left and center fields, named as such because typically when balls are hit in this area of the field, players will generally get a hit known as a "double" because of the depth of the field in this area, as well as the multiple fence angles.

Doubles Alley is also the name of the area beyond the left field fencing where fans tailgate and have cookouts before and during games. These fans have become known for their occasional taunting of opposing team's outfield players.

=== Triple Play Patio ===
The Triple Play Patio is a patio/fan lounge area that sits directly above Troy's home dugout along the third base line. The patio is also directly connected to the Lott Baseball Complex, which houses the baseball staff offices and player practice facilities. The patio was added during the 2008 renovations.

=== "Monster" Wall ===
The Monster is a 30-foot tall wall in right field that features a Daktronics HD LED video board, as well as a complete LED scoreboard system. It is one of the tallest and largest outfield walls in all of college baseball.

== Lott Baseball Complex ==
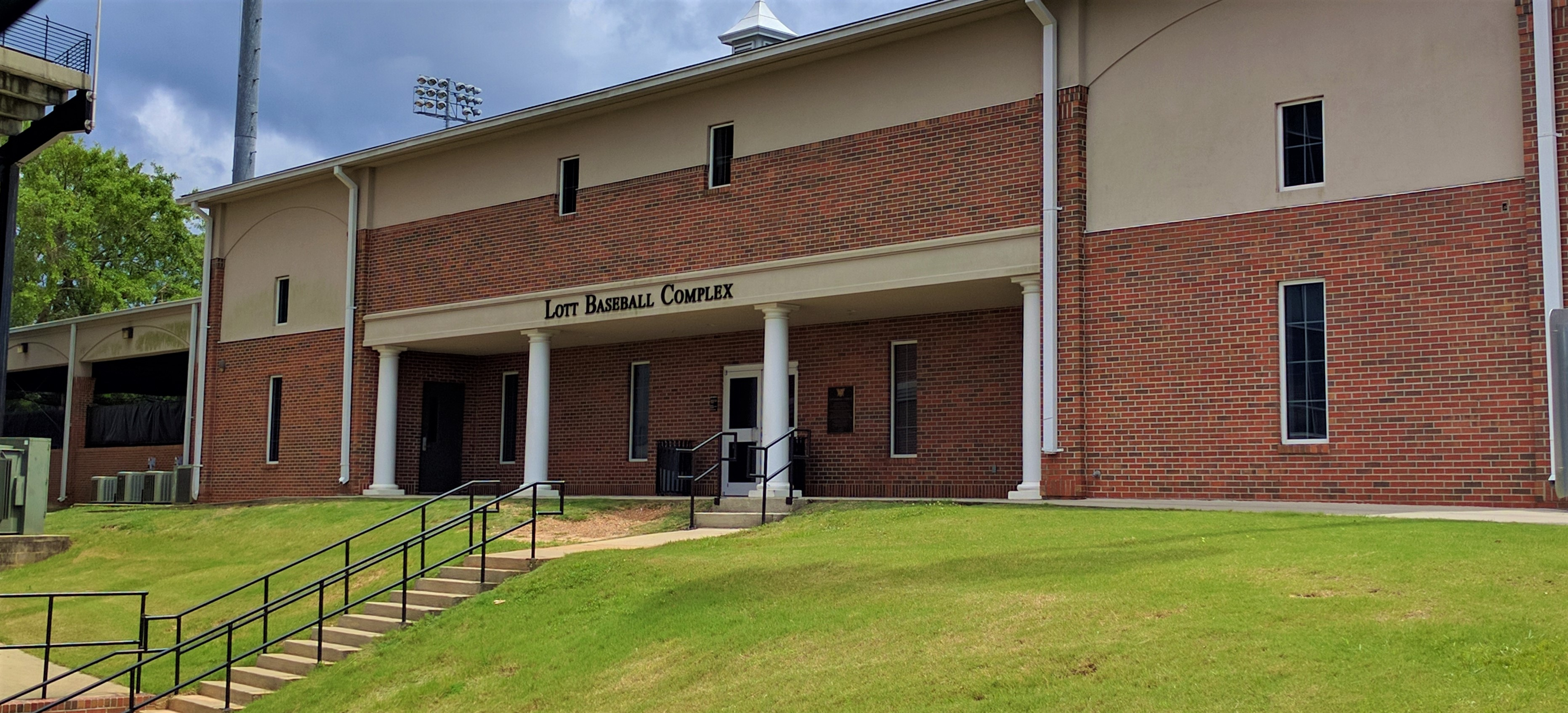
The Lott Baseball Complex, which houses coaches offices, player lounge and locker rooms, and indoor batting cages.

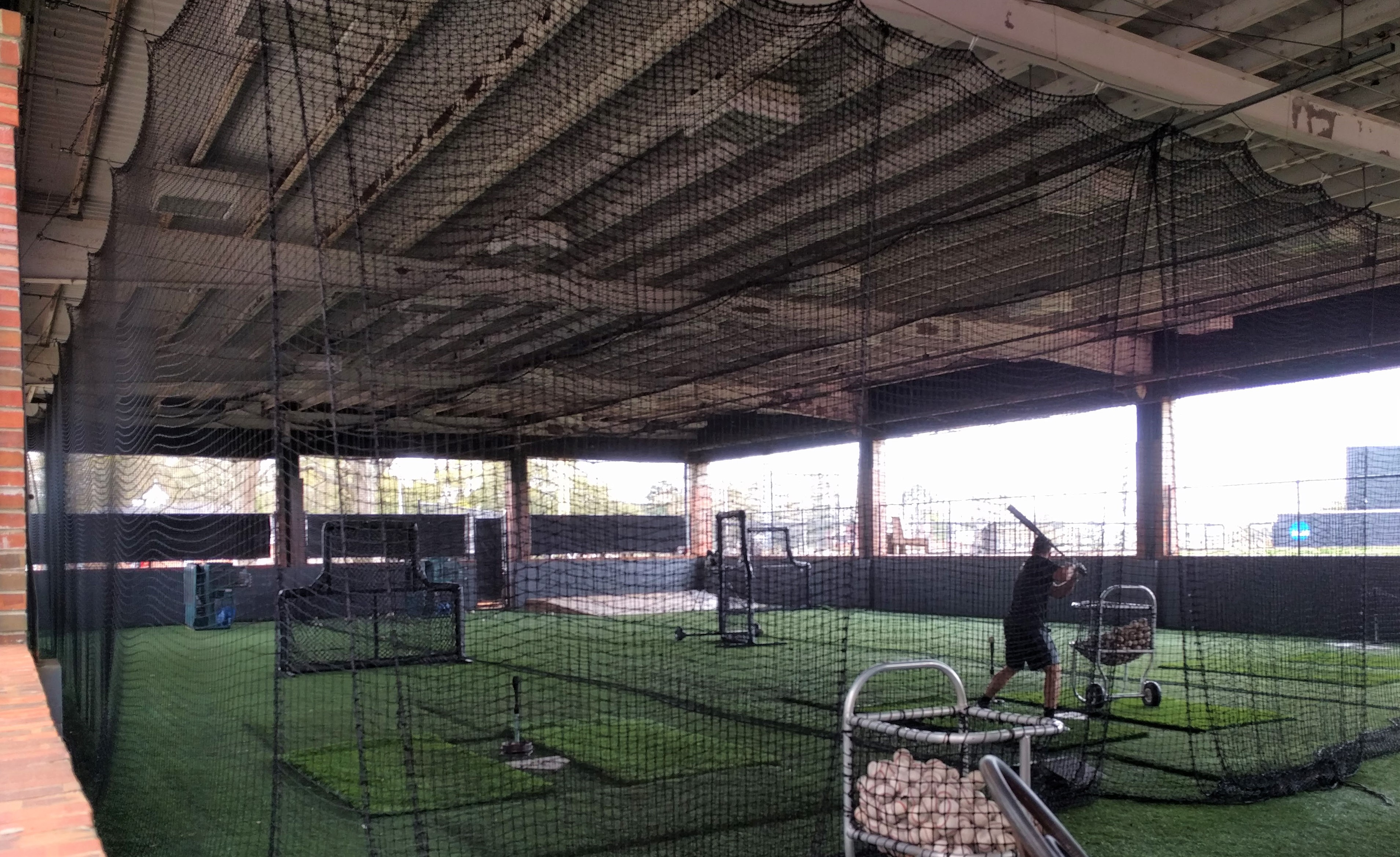
The batting cages inside the Lott Complex.

The Lott Baseball Complex was built during the 2008 renovations. The complex is a two-story building that was built along the left field line that houses a large batting cage, baseball staff offices, athletic training rooms, cool-down pools, HD video rooms, a players’ lounge, and a locker room featuring 42 Major League Baseball-size lockers.

The home dugout was extended in length and was connected to the new Lott Complex. The Triple Play Patio is also connected to the complex.

== Attendance ==
=== Highest Attended Games ===
The following is a list of the Top 5 single-game attendance records at Riddle–Pace Field.

Attendance	Opponent	Year
7,033	Little Rock	2026
6,426	Little Rock	2026
3,982	Alabama	2026
3,892	Alabama	2025
3,872	Alabama	2024

=== Top 50 Attendance Years ===
Troy has ranked as one of the Top 50 teams in baseball for home attendance during these seasons:

Year	Avg. attendance	Rank
2013	1,211	50th
2012	1,282	42nd
2010	1,188	47th
2009	1,208	46th
2008	1,301	46th
2007	1,425	45th
2005	1,130	47th

== Gallery ==
Pictures of Riddle-Pace Field
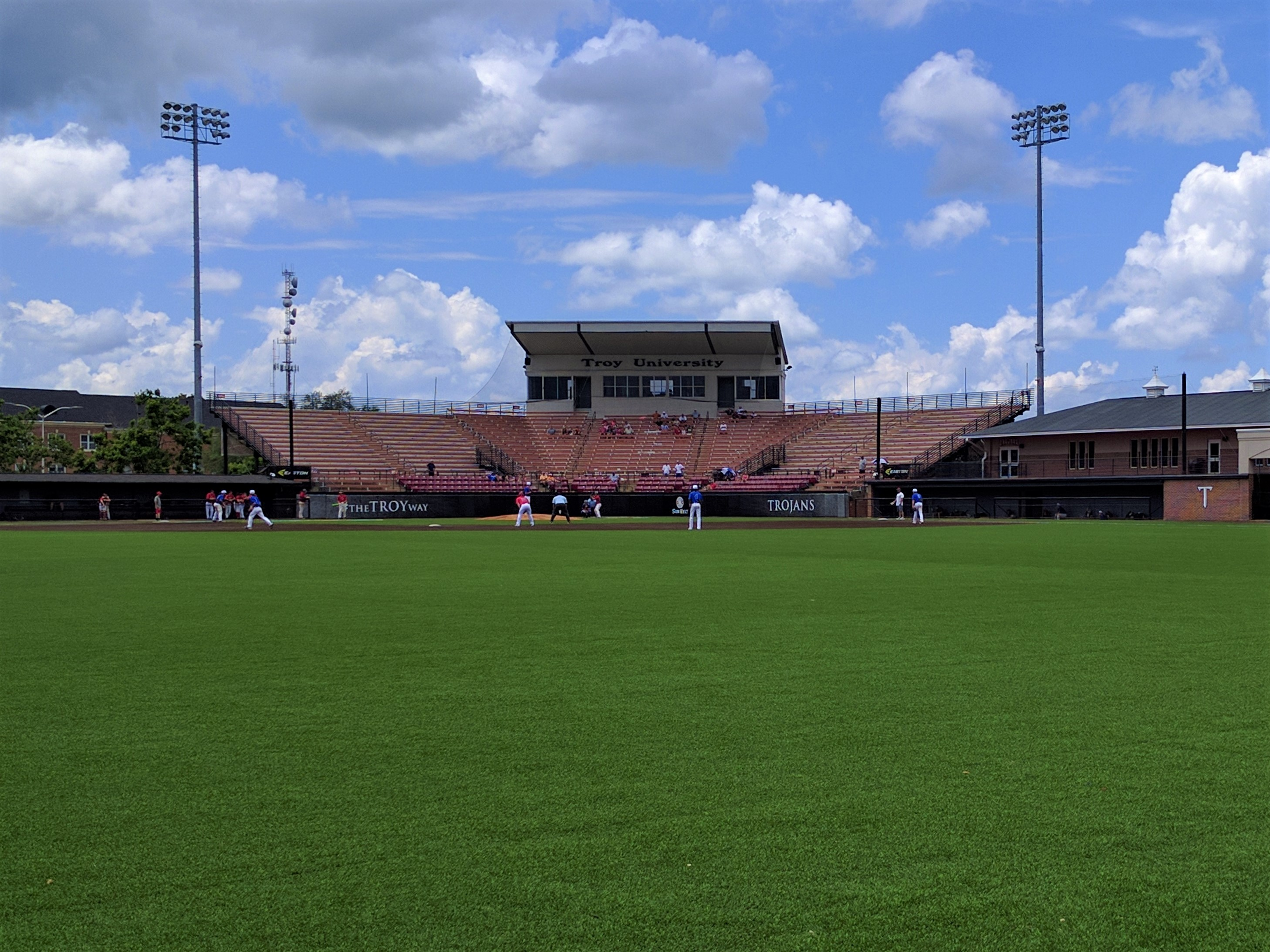
View of the grandstand from the outfield fence.

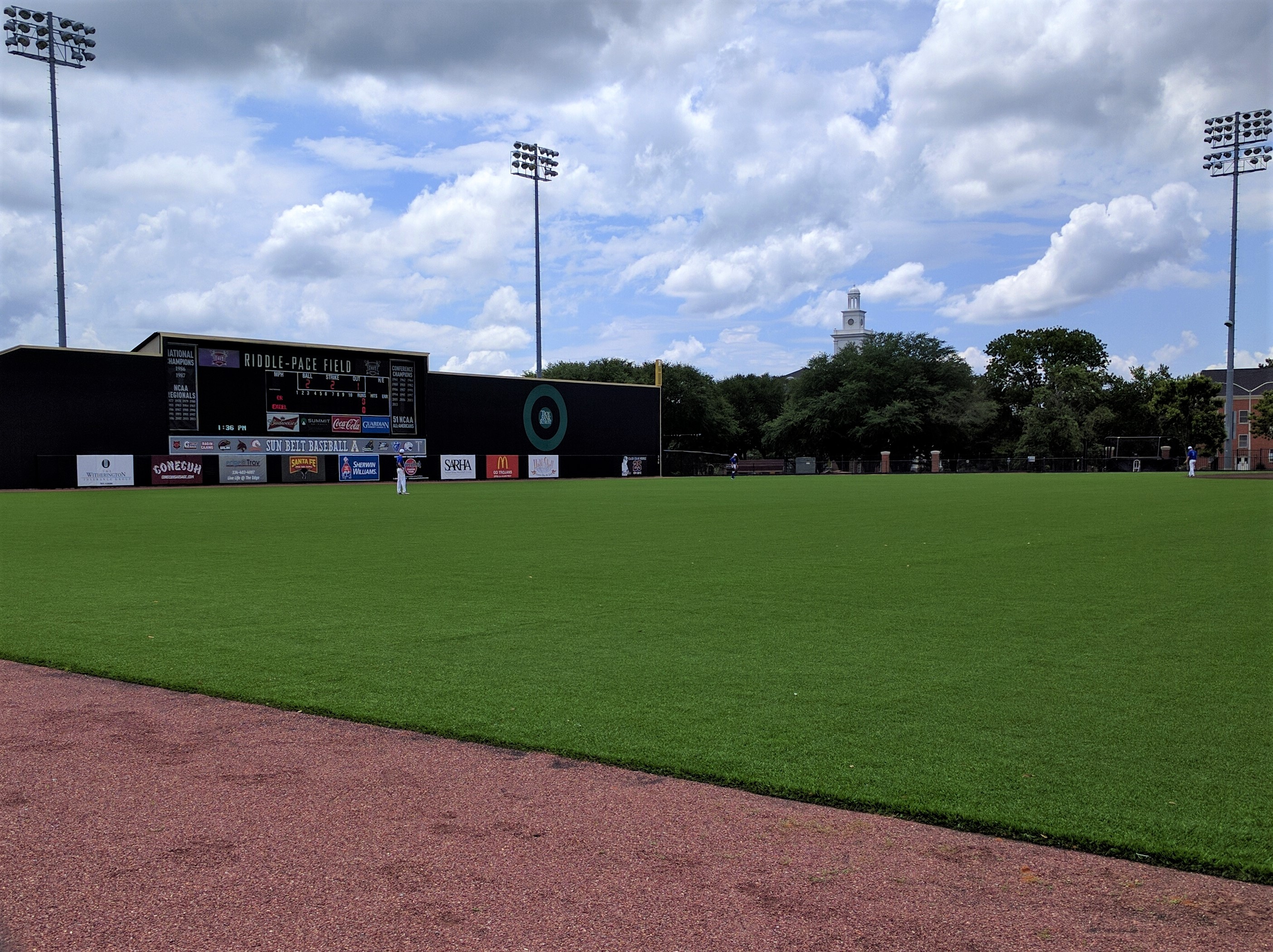
Full view of the "Black Monster."

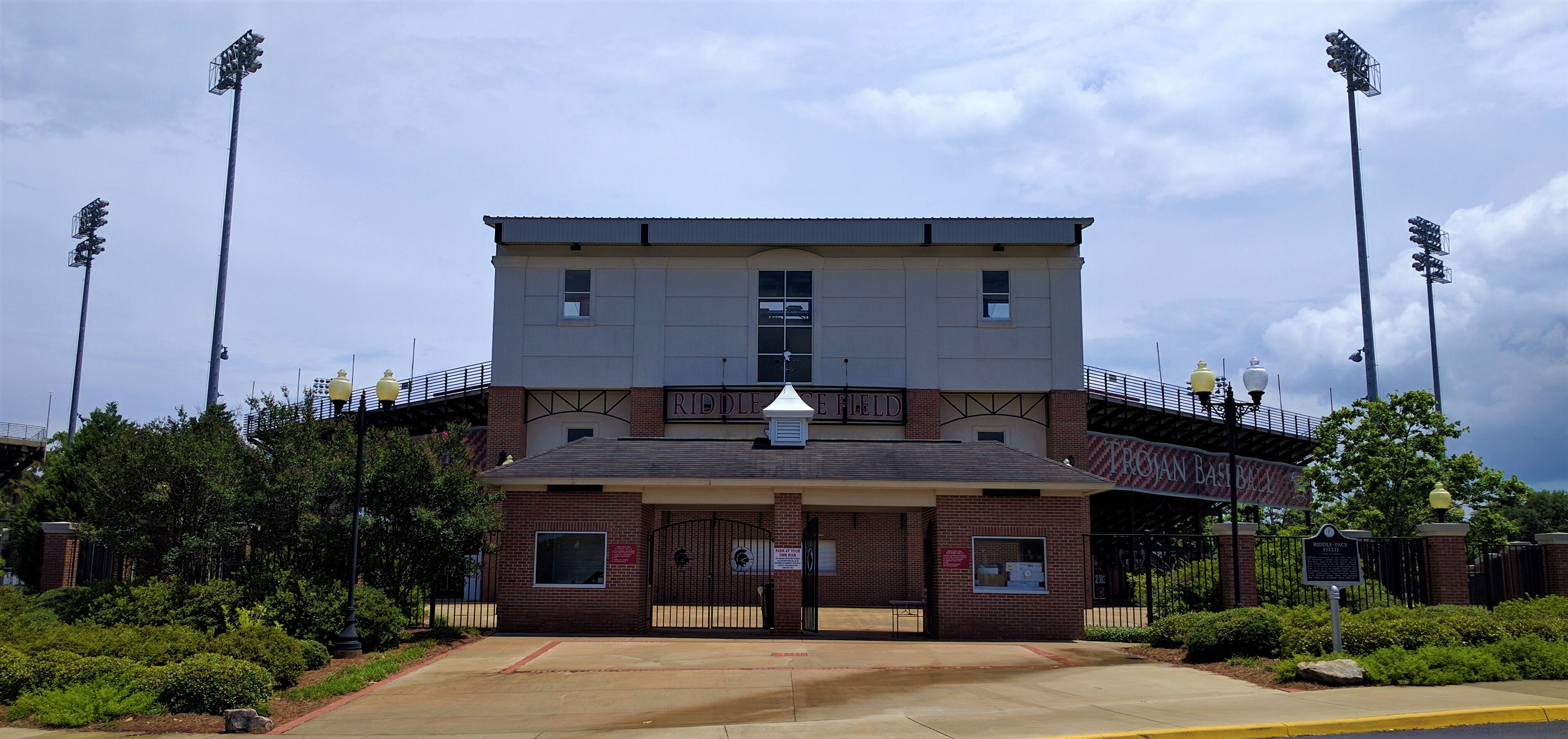
Main entrance to Riddle-Pace Field.

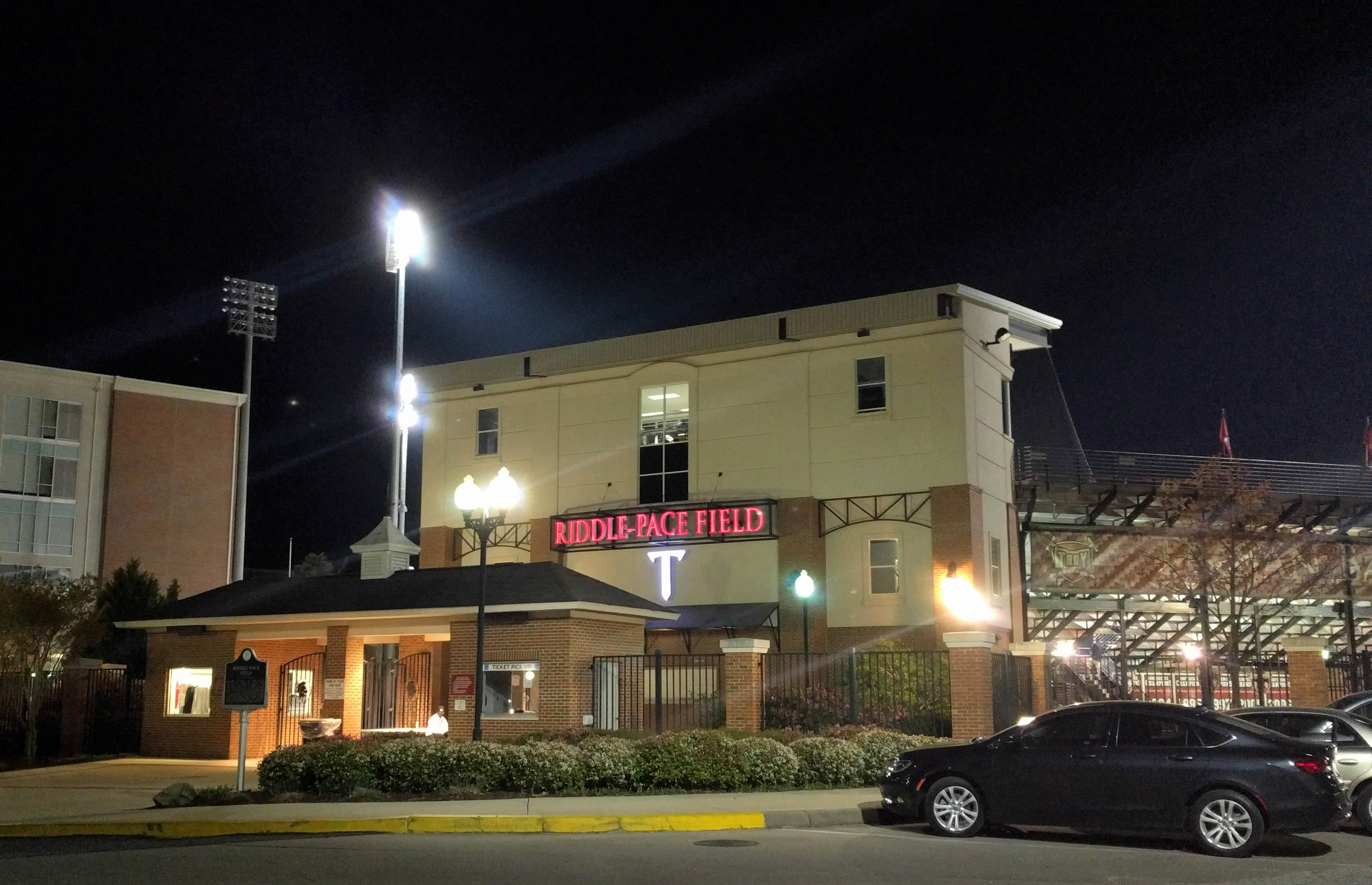
Riddle-Pace Field at night.

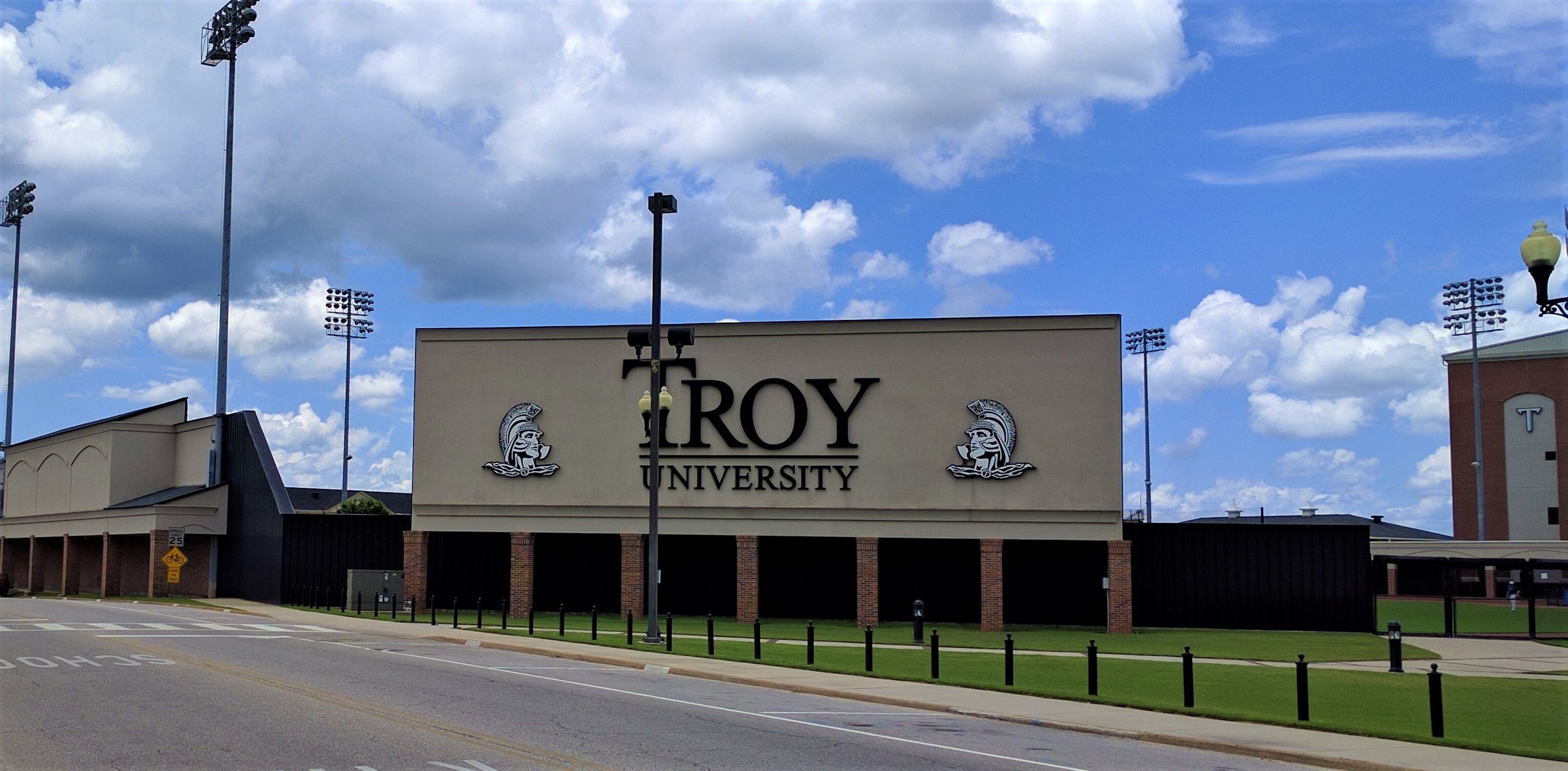
Exterior view of the outfield walls.

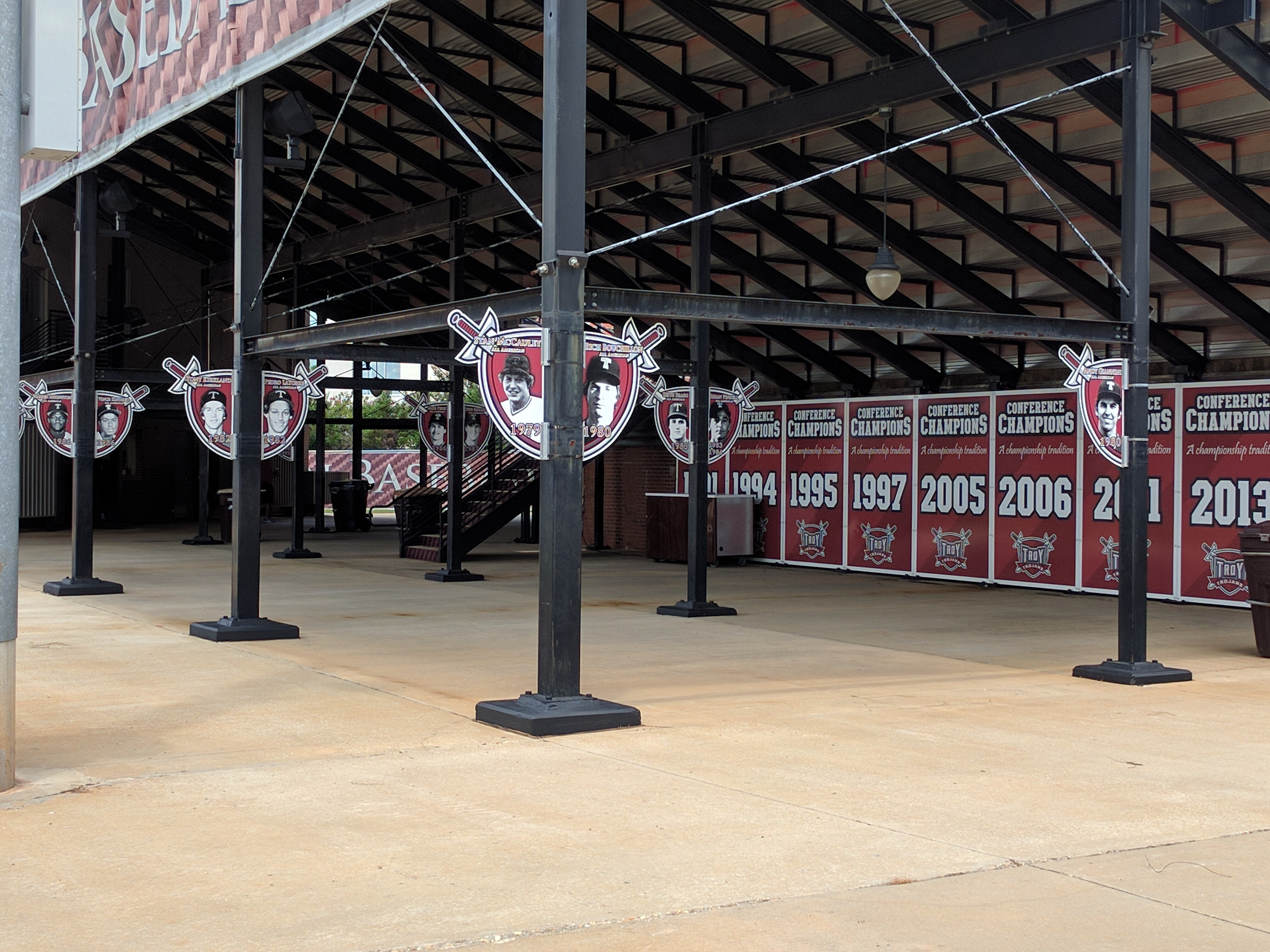
Main concourse beneath the grandstand.

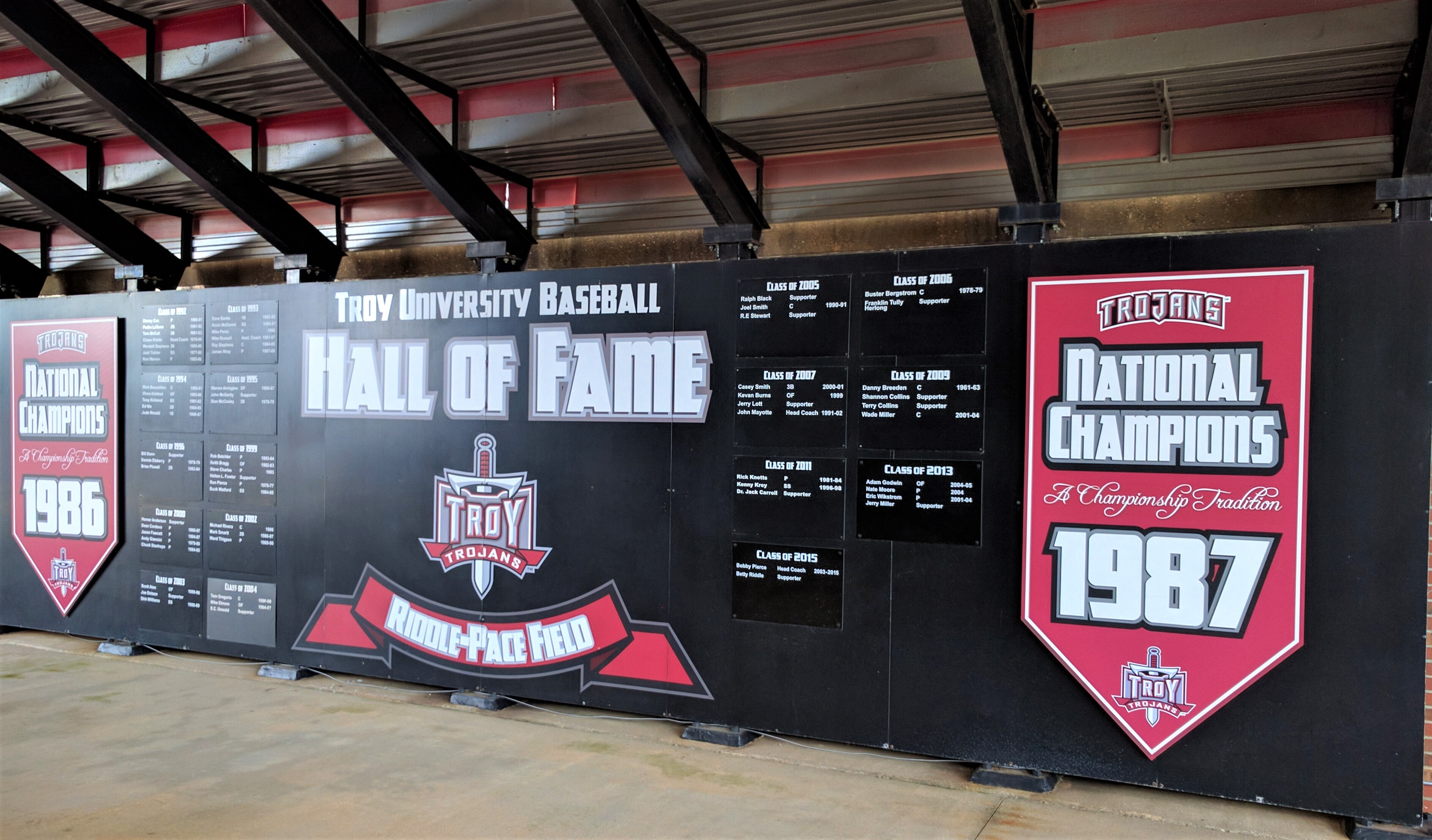
Main concourse beneath the grandstand with the Troy Baseball Hall of Fame.

== See also ==
- List of NCAA Division I baseball venues
