= Frank Martin (American football) =

American football player (1919–1980)

No. 12, 7, 10, 24, 33, 18
- Position: Halfback

Personal information
- Born: June 13, 1919; Calera, Alabama, U.S.
- Died: May 20, 1980 (aged 60); Birmingham, Alabama, U.S.
- Listed height: 5 ft 10 in (1.78 m)
- Listed weight: 177 lb (80 kg)

Career information
- High school: Shelby County (Columbiana, Alabama)
- College: Alabama (1939–1942)
- NFL draft: 1943: undrafted

Career history
- Brooklyn Dodgers/Tigers (1943–1944); Boston Yanks (1945); New York Giants (1945)

Awards and highlights
- National champion (1941)

Career NFL statistics
- Games played: 22
- Rushing yards: 79
- Receptions: 20
- Receiving yards: 234
- Receiving touchdowns: 1
- Passing attempts: 5
- Passing completions: 3
- Completion percentage: 60.0%
- Passing yards: 22
- Return yards: 82
- Stats at Pro Football Reference

Frank Hayes Martin (June 13, 1919 – May 20, 1980) was an American professional football halfback for the Brooklyn Dodgers/Tigers, Boston Yanks and New York Giants of the National Football League (NFL). He played college football for the Alabama Crimson Tide. Martin was also a minor league baseball player and manager.

== Early life ==
Martin was born on June 13, 1919, in Calera, Alabama. He attended Shelby County High School in Columbiana, Alabama.

== College career ==
Martin played college football for the Alabama Crimson Tide from 1939 to 1942 at halfback. He was a member of 1941 national championship team. Martin also played college baseball for the Crimson Tide and lettered in 1942 as an infielder.

== Professional football career ==
In 1943, Martin played for the Brooklyn Dodgers at halfback, rushing for 50 yards and 152 receiving yards on 13 catches. He also had two interceptions on defense. The following year, Martin had 18 rushing yards, three receptions for 15 yards and one interception. In 1945, after the Brooklyn Tigers and Boston Yanks merged, he played three games for the team before he was released. In those games, Martin had ten rushing yards and one catch for 53-yard touchdown. On October 18, he signed with the New York Giants, rushing for one yard, catch three passes for 14 yards and intercepting one pass in three games. On November 8, Martin was released by the team.

== Professional baseball career ==
Martin played for multiple minor league teams from 1944 to 1948 and made it as high as the American Association, one level below Major League Baseball in the St. Louis Cardinals farm system. He played at catcher and third baseman in his career. In 1946, Martin was named the manager of the Dothan Browns of the Alabama State League (ALSL). In two seasons, he won 141 games and lost 128. On January 21, 1948, he was announced as the manager of the Ozark Eagles. Martin won 61 games and 65.

== Personal life ==
After retiring from professional football and baseball, Martin was a sales manager at a sporting goods store in Birmingham, Alabama for 14 years. He died on May 20, 1980, in Birmingham.
