= Alabama–Florida League =

US baseball league

- Classification: Class D (1936–1939, 1951–1962)
- Sport: Minor League Baseball
- First season: 1936
- Folded: 1962
- Replaced by: Alabama State League
- President: George M. Grant (1936–1939); Charles T. Laney (1939); G.D. Halstead (1951); C.C. Hodge (1952–1954); Herman D. White (1955); Sam C. Smith (1956–1958); William Moore (1959–1962)
- No. of teams: 22
- Country: United States of America
- Most titles: 3 Dothan

The Alabama–Florida League was a low-level circuit in American minor league baseball that existed from 1936 through 1939 and 1951 through 1962. The temporary absence of clubs based in Florida caused the league to change its name to the Alabama State League in 1940–1941 and from 1946 to 1950.

== History ==
The Alabama–Florida League was founded in 1936. In 1940 the league changed its name to the Alabama State League. In 1951, the Alabama State League switched its name back to the Alabama–Florida. The Alabama–Florida League played 12 more seasons after reforming. The Alabama–Florida League was a Class D level league for its duration.

The Class D loop's longest serving members included clubs in Andalusia, Brewton, Dothan, Enterprise, Greenville, Ozark and Troy, all in Alabama, and the Florida cities of Fort Walton Beach, Graceville and Panama City.

Montgomery, Alabama, the largest city to be represented in the league, was a member for six seasons (1957–1962).

In 1962, the league's final year, the Pensacola Senators, a Washington Senators farm club managed by Wayne Terwilliger, won the pennant by 22 games and led the league in attendance. It was the only Alabama–Florida League team to post a winning record.

== Alabama–Florida League teams ==
- Abbeville, AL: Abbeville Red Sox 1936 ** The team disbanded on August 10, 1936
- Andalusia, AL: Andalusia Reds 1936; Andalusia Bulldogs 1937–1938; Andalusia Rams 1939; Andalusia Arrows 1953; Andalusia-Opp Indians 1954; Andalusia Dodgers 1962 (** The Dodgers moved to Ozark on July 10, 1962)
- Columbus, GA: Columbus Foxes 1958
- Crestview, FL: Crestview Braves 1954–1956
- Donalsonville, GA: Donalsonville Indians 1955; Donalsonville Seminoles 1956
- Dothan, AL: Dothan Boll Weevils 1936; Dothan Browns 1937–1939; Dothan Browns 1951–1952; Dothan Rebels 1953–1954; Dothan Cardinals 1955–1956; Dothan Cardinals 1958–1960; Dothan Phillies 1961–1962
- Enterprise, AL: Enterprise Browns 1936; Enterprise Boll Weevils 1951–1952 (** The Boll Weevils moved to Graceville on July 5, 1952)
- Eufaula, AL: Eufaula Millers 1952–1953
- Evergreen, AL: Evergreen Greenies 1937–1938 (** The team moved from Ozark at start of 1937 season's second half on June 29, 1937)
- Fort Walton Beach, FL: Fort Walton Beach Jets 1953–1962
- Graceville, FL: Graceville Boll Weevils 1952; Graceville Oilers 1953–1958 (** The Boll Weevils moved from Enterprise on July 5, 1952)
- Greenville, AL: Greenville Lions 1939
- Headland, AL: Headland Dixie Runners 1951–1952
- Montgomery, AL: Montgomery Rebels 1957–1962
- Ozark, AL: Ozark Cardinals 1936–1937; Ozark Eagles 1951–1952; Ozark Dodgers 1962 (** The Cardinals moved to Evergreen at start of 1937 season's second half on June 29, 1937. The Dodgers moved from Andalusia on July 10, 1962)
- Panama City, FL: Panama City Papermakers 1936; Panama City Pelicans 1937–1939; Panama City Fliers 1951–1961
- Pensacola, FL: Pensacola Dons 1957–1959; Pensacola Angels 1960; Pensacola Senators 1961–1962
- Selma, AL: Selma Cloverleafs 1957–1962
- Tallahassee, FL: Tallahassee Citizens 1951
- Tallassee, AL: Tallassee Indians 1939
- Troy, AL: Troy Trojans 1936–1939
- Union Springs, AL: Union Springs Springers 1936–1937; Union Springs Red Birds 1938

== Alabama–Florida League champions ==
1936: Andalusia Reds
1937: Andalusia Bulldogs
1938: Troy Trojans
1939: Tallassee Indians
1951: Dothan Browns
1952: Ozark Eagles
1953: Dothan Rebels
1954: Graceville Oilers
1955: Panama City Fliers
1956: Donalsonville Seminoles
1957: Graceville Oilers
1958: Dothan Cardinals
1959: Selma Cloverleafs
1960: Pensacola Angels
1961: Selma Cloverleafs
1962: Selma Cloverleafs

== Alabama State League teams ==
- Andalusia Arrows
- Andalusia Rams
- Brewton Millers
- Dothan Browns
- Enterprise Boll Weevils
- Geneva Red Birds
- Greenville Lions
- Greenville Pirates
- Headland Dixie Runners
- Ozark Eagles
- Troy Dodgers
- Troy Tigers
- Troy Trojans
- Tuskegee Airmen
