= Tuskegee Airmen (disambiguation) =

The Tuskegee Airmen were a group of African American pilots who fought in World War II.

Tuskegee Airmen may also refer to:

- Tuskegee Airmen National Historic Site
- The Tuskegee Airmen, a 1995 movie
- Tuskegee Airmen, defunct minor league baseball team.
- The 1,007 documented cadet graduates from the Advanced Aviation Training Cadet Program: List of Tuskegee Airmen Cadet Pilot Graduation Classes, 1942-1946, listing graduating Cadet Pilots by Class, Year and Class Type

== See also ==
- List of Tuskegee Airmen
