= Graceville Oilers =

- 1936–1958; (1936, 1947–1958); Graceville, Florida

Minor league affiliations
- Previous classes: Class D
- League: Alabama–Florida League (1951–1958)
- Previous leagues: Alabama State League (1947–1950); Alabama–Florida League (1936)

Major league affiliations
- Previous teams: Cincinnati Reds (1957–1958)

Minor league titles
- League titles: 2 (1954, 1957)

Team data
- Previous names: Graceville Oilers (1953–1958); Graceville Boll Weevils (1952); Enterprise Boll Weevils (1947–1952); Enterprise Browns (1936)

The Graceville Oilers were a Minor League Baseball team that represented the city of Graceville, Florida. They played in the Alabama–Florida League from 1947 to 1958. They were based in Enterprise, Alabama, and known as the Enterprise Boll Weevils until they moved to Graceville during the 1952 season.
