= Pensacola Senators =

Penscaola Senators
- 1957–1962; Pensacola, Florida

Minor league affiliations
- Previous classes: Class D
- League: Alabama–Florida League

Major league affiliations
- Previous teams: Washington Senators (1961–1962); Chicago White Sox (1960); Baltimore Orioles (1958–1959)

Minor league titles
- League titles: 1960

Team data
- Previous names: Pensacola Senators (1961–1962); Pensacola Angels (1960); Pensacola Dons (1957–1959)

The Pensacola Senators (also the Dons and Angels) were a Minor League Baseball team, based in Pensacola, Florida, United States, that operated in the Alabama–Florida League between 1957 and 1962.
