= Alabama State League =

Minor league baseball league

- Formerly: Alabama-Florida League
- Classification: Class D (1940–1941, 1947–1950)
- Sport: Minor League Baseball
- First season: 1940
- Folded: 1950
- Replaced by: Alabama-Florida League
- President: Charles T. Laney (1940); J. Eric Ballard (1941); Jack Hovater (1947–1948); Charles T. Laney (1949–1950)
- No. of teams: 11
- Country: United States of America
- Most titles: 2 Dothan Browns

The Alabama State League was a minor league baseball league that played between 1940 and 1950, with an interruption due to World War II. The Alabama State League was a Class D level league. The Alabama State League consisted of teams based exclusively in Alabama, evolving from and into the Alabama-Florida League, as that league added and reduced Florida based franchises.

== History ==
In 1940, the Alabama-Florida League changed its name to the Alabama State League after the Florida based Panama City Pelicans franchise folded, leaving the league with only Alabama based franchises. After two years, the league shut down due to World War II, but resumed activity in 1946. After another five years of operation, the Alabama-Florida name was brought back for the 1951 season, when the Panama City Fliers franchise joined the league. The Alabama State League was a Class D level league for its duration.

The Alabama State League began play as a six–team league in 1940, with the Andalusia Rams, Brewton Millers, Dothan Browns, Greenville Lions, Tallassee Indians and Troy Trojans as charter members.

== Cities represented ==
- Andalusia, AL: Andalusia Rams (1940–1941); Andalusia Arrows (1947–1950)
- Brewton, AL: Brewton Millers (1940–1941, 1946–1950)
- Dothan, AL: Dothan Browns (1940–1941, 1946–1950)
- Enterprise, AL: Enterprise Boll Weevils (1947–1950)
- Geneva, AL: Geneva Red Birds (1946–1950)
- Greenville, AL: Greenville Lions (1940–1941, 1946–1948); Greenville Pirates (1949–1950)
- Headland, AL: Headland Dixie Runners (1950)
- Ozark, AL: Ozark Eagles (1946–1950)
- Tallassee, AL: Tallassee Indians (1940–1941)
- Troy, AL: Troy Trojans (1940); Troy Dodgers (1941); Troy Trojans (1946–1947); Troy Tigers (1948–1949)
- Tuskegee, AL: Tuskegee Airmen (1941)

== Standings & statistics ==
1940 Alabama State League schedule

Team standings	W	L	GB	Pct.	Manager
Tallassee Indians	84	45	.651	–	Steve Bysco
Greenville Lions	71	59	.546	13½	Dick Luckey
Dothan Browns	67	62	.519	17	Cat Milner
Troy Trojans	66	63	.512	18	Ellis Johnson / Harold Fehrenbacher
Brewton Millers	51	79	.392	33½	Yam Yaryan
Andalusia Rams	49	80	.380	35	Bruner Nix / Oscar Mosley

Playoffs: Greenville 3 games, Troy 2; Dothan 3 games, Tallassee 2.
Finals: Dothan 4 games, Greenville 2.

Player statistics
Player	Team	Stat	Tot	Player	Team	Stat	Tot
Emory Lindsey	Tallassee	BA	.350	John Travis	Greenville	W	20
Felix Jurwiak	Dothan	Runs	121	Steve Bysco	Tallassee	W	20
James Persons	Tallassee	Hits	172	Royce Lint	Andalusia	So	166
Johnny Ostrowski	Troy	RBI	120	John Travis	Greenville	ERA	3.18
Gordon Goodell	Tallassee	HR	31				

1941 Alabama State League schedule

Team standings	W	L	GB	Pct.	Manager
Dothan Browns	79	40	.664	–	Cat Milner
Tallassee Indians	75	45	.625	4½	Steve Bysco
Andalusia Rams	60	60	.500	19½	Ralph McAdams
Brewton Millers	49	68	.419	29	Lee Head
Troy Dodgers / Tuskegee Airmen	48	71	.403	31	Pudge Powers
Greenville Lions	45	72	.385	33	Ernie Wingard / Herb Thomas

Troy (37–50) moved to Tuskegee July 31.
Playoffs: Dothan 3 games, Andalusia 1; Tallassee 3 games, Brewton 1.
Finals: Dothan 4 games, Tallassee 1.

Player statistics
Player	Team	Stat	Tot	Player	Team	Stat	Tot
Luther Gunnells	Dothan	BA	.395	Joe Rivers	Dothan	W	20
Luther Gunnells	Dothan	Runs	143	Francis Mannheim	Tallassee	SO	184
Ray Knowles	Tallassee	Hits	199	Cy Moore	Tallassee	ERA	2.84
Forrest Austin	Tallassee	RBI	149	Forrest Austin	Tallassee	HR	32

1946 Alabama State League

Team standings	W	L	GB	Pct.	Manager
Dothan Browns	72	58	.554	–	Frank Martin
Geneva Red Birds	69	61	.531	3	Charles Holly
Greenville Lions	67	62	.519	4½	Dan Miller / William Anderson
Brewton Millers	63	65	.492	8	Ben Catchings
Troy Trojans	60	68	.469	11	Norman DeWeese
Ozark Eagles	55	72	.433	15½	Ray Knapp / Dick Coffman

Playoffs: Geneva 3 games, Brewton 1; Greenville 3 games, Dothan 1.
Finals: Geneva 3 games, Greenville 1.

Player statistics
Player	Team	Stat	Tot	Player	Team	Stat	Tot
Emil Bozich	Troy	BA	.354	James Atkins	Geneva	W	20
Melvin Schwab	Ozark	Runs	128	Max Peterson	Greenville	W	20
Emil Bozich	Troy	Hits	178	Carl Johnson	Dothan	ERA	2.46
Harold Walther	Green/Gen	RBI	124	Earl Johnson	Dothan	SO	271
Harold Walther	Green/Gen	HR	17	Melvin Schwab	Ozark	HR	17

1947 Alabama State League schedule

Team standings	W	L	PCT	GB	Attend	Managers
Greenville Lions	90	48	.652	–	40,000	Sam Demma
Brewton Millers	78	59	.569	11½	42,000	Norman Veazey
Enterprise Boll Weevils	77	61	.558	13	53,000	Ben Catchings
Dothan Browns	69	70	.496	21½	50,000	Frank Martin / Woody Coombs; Emory Lindsey
Andalusia Arrows	67	71	.486	23	62,000	Robert Engle
Ozark Eagles	65	74	.468	25½	45,000	Dolly Lambert
Troy Trojans	58	80	.420	32	37,000	Bob Benish
Geneva Red Birds	49	90	.353	41½	35,000	Jimmy Francoline / Francis Welker

Playoffs: Greenville 4 games, Enterprise 3; Brewton 4 games, Dothan 3.
Finals: Greenville 4 games, Brewton 3.

Player statistics
Player	Team	Stat	Tot	Player	Team	Stat	Tot
Perry Roberts	Greenville	BA	.389	Max Peterson	Greenville	W	27
Ben Catchings	Enterprise	Runs	126	Max Peterson	Greenville	SO	266
Perry Roberts	Greenville	Hits	228	Max Peterson	Greenville	ERA	2.02
Perry Roberts	Greenville	RBI	152	Andy Archipoli	Ozark	HR	24

1948 Alabama State League

Team standings	W	L	PCT	GB	Attend	Managers
Troy Tigers	83	41	.669	–	40,242	Bob Benish
Greenville Pirates	80	46	.635	4	30,424	Walt Tauscher
Dothan Browns	64	62	.508	20	57,638	Cat Milner
Ozark Eagles	61	65	.484	23	36,500	Frank Martin
Brewton Millers	58	68	.460	26	29,227	Joe Beaugez / Bill McGhee
Enterprise Boll Weevils	57	67	.460	26	39,416	Dolly Lambert / Richard Bixby
Geneva Red Birds	54	72	.429	30	36,781	Harold Ferenbacher
Andalusia Arrows	45	81	.357	39	40,000	John George / Charlie Wilcox

Playoffs: Dothan 4 games, Troy 2; Greenville 4 games, Ozark 3.
Finals: Dothan 4 games, Greenville 0.

Player statistics
Player	Team	Stat	Tot	Player	Team	Stat	Tot
Bill McGhee	Brewton	BA	.356	Frank Hill	Dothan	W	22
John Burns	Greenville	Runs	108	Frank Hill	Dothan	SO	209
Bill Godwin	Ozark	Hits	157	Richard Gilkerson	Troy	ERA	1.69
Glen Lindermuth	Greenville	RBI	107	John Powell	Andalusia	HR	17

1949 Alabama State League schedule

Team standings	W	L	PCT	GB	Attend	Managers
Greenville Pirates	83	44	.654	–	23,443	Walt Tauscher
Ozark Eagles	82	45	.646	1	25,804	George Hennessey
Enterprise Boll Weevils	63	61	.508	18½	30,603	Russell Taylor
Andalusia Arrows	59	65	.476	22½	39,958	Manny Russo / Robert Engle
Dothan Browns	57	68	.456	25	32,471	Joe Cavosie / James Coller / Daniel Long
Geneva Red Birds	56	69	.448	26	23,775	Carl Wollgast
Brewton Millers	51	73	.411	30½	25,533	Joe Szuch / Norman Veazey
Troy Tigers	49	75	.395	32½	18,323	Cat Milner

Playoffs: Greenville 4 games, Enterprise 1; Andalusia 4 games, Ozark 1.
Finals: Andalusia 4 games, Greenville 1.

Player statistics
Player	Team	Stat	Tot	Player	Team	Stat	Tot
Roy LeFevre	Greenville	BA	.321	Carl Wollgast	Geneva	W	22
George Hughes	Ozark	Runs	114	Spencer Davis	Ozark	SO	220
Roy LeFevre	Greenville	Hits	151	Carl Wollgast	Geneva	ERA	1.89
Doug Walker	Ozark	RBI	107	Tom McBride	Geneva/Ozark	HR	15

1950 Alabama State League

Team standings	W	L	PCT	GB	Attend	Managers
Enterprise Boll Weevils	76	49	.608	–	23,269	Paul O'Dea
Dothan Browns	72	53	.576	4	51,665	Shovel Hodge
Headland Dixie Runners	68	56	.548	7½	27,121	John A. McPherson
Greenville Pirates	65	61	.516	11½	17,106	Mickey O'Neil
Andalusia Arrows	63	62	.504	13	43,163	Bubba Ball
Brewton Millers	54	72	.429	22½	24,397	Cat Milner / Cotton McCaskey; Sam Demma
Geneva Red Birds	52	73	.416	24	14,194	Johnny Grodzicki / Robert Comiskey
Ozark Eagles	51	75	.405	25½	17,779	Julian Morgan

Playoffs: Headland 4 games, Enterprise 3; Dothan 4 games, Greenville 2.
Finals: Dothan 4 games, Headland 1.

Player statistics
Player	Team	Stat	Tot	Player	Team	Stat	Tot
John A. McPherson	Headland	BA	.405	David Hataway	Andalusia	W	23
Joe Harper	Headland	Runs	138	Thomas Stone	Headland	SO	246
John A. McPherson	Headland	Hits	197	James Pomykala	Greenville	ERA	2.19
John A. McPherson	Headland	RBI	132	Lamar Bowden	Dothan	HR	15
