= Greenville Stadium =

Baseball ballpark in Greenville, Alabama

Coordinates: 31°49′47.1″N 86°36′27.54″W

Greenville Stadium, also known as Bee Land Park and Lions Park, was a baseball ballpark based in Greenville, Alabama, United States that served as the home of the Greenville Lions and the Greenville Pirates. It was used from 1939 to 1941 and from 1946 to 1950.
