= Eufaula Millers =

- 1952–1953; Eufaula, Alabama

Minor league affiliations
- Previous classes: Class D
- League: Alabama–Florida League

Team data
- Previous parks: Comer Park

The Eufaula Millers were a Minor League Baseball team based in Eufaula, Alabama, that played in the Alabama–Florida League in 1952 and 1953. A previous minor league team from Eufaula played in the Dixie League in 1916–1917.
