= Ellis Johnson (baseball) =

American baseball player (1892–1965)

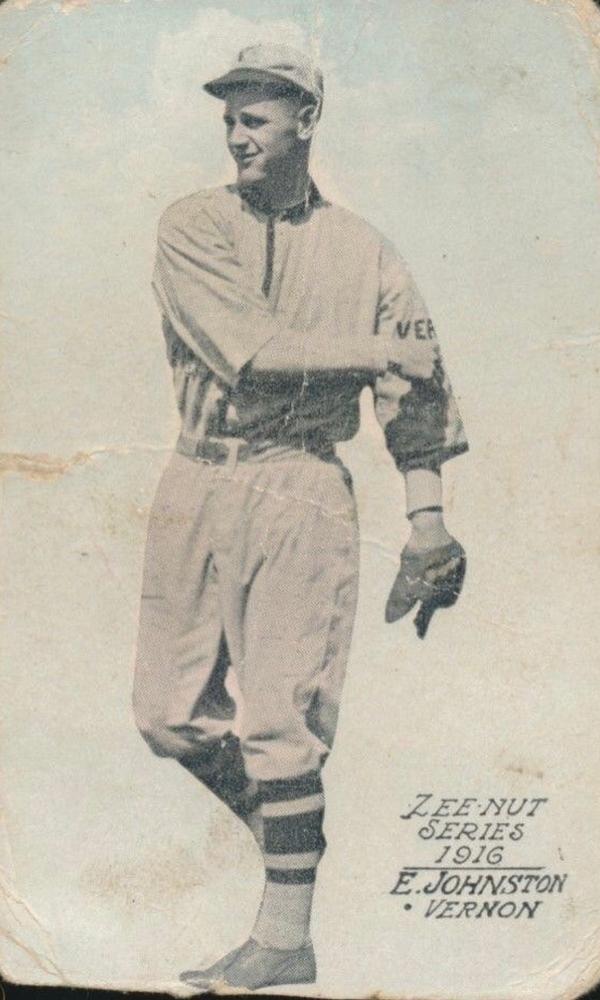
- Pitcher
- Born: December 8, 1892; Minneapolis, Minnesota, U.S.
- Died: January 14, 1965 (aged 72); Minneapolis, Minnesota, U.S.
- Batted: Right Threw: Right

MLB debut
- July 6, 1912, for the Chicago White Sox

Last MLB appearance
- October 2, 1917, for the Philadelphia Athletics

MLB statistics
- Win–loss record: 0-2
- Earned run average: 5.93
- Strikeouts: 18
- Stats at Baseball Reference

Teams
- Chicago White Sox (1912, 1915); Philadelphia Athletics (1917)

Ellis Walter Johnson (December 8, 1892 – January 14, 1965) was an American pitcher in Major League Baseball, who appeared in eight games over three seasons for the Chicago White Sox and Philadelphia Athletics.
