= Walt Tauscher =

American baseball player

- Pitcher
- Born: November 22, 1902; LaSalle, Illinois, U.S.
- Died: November 27, 1992 (aged 90); Winter Park, Florida, U.S.
- Batted: Right Threw: Right

MLB debut
- April 19, 1928, for the Pittsburgh Pirates

Last MLB appearance
- May 5, 1931, for the Washington Senators

MLB statistics
- Win–loss record: 1–0
- Earned run average: 5.66
- Strikeouts: 12
- Stats at Baseball Reference

Teams
- Pittsburgh Pirates (1928); Washington Senators (1931)

Walter Edward Tauscher (November 22, 1901 – November 27, 1992) was an American right-handed Major League Baseball pitcher who played for the Pittsburgh Pirates in 1928 and the Washington Senators in 1931. He won 263 games in the minor leagues and managed at that level for five seasons.

== Major league career ==
Tauscher made his major league debut on April 19, 1928 and pitched in 17 games in relief for the Pirates that year, going 0–0 with a 4.91 ERA as a 25-year-old rookie. In 29 1/3 innings, he allowed only 28 hits while walking 12 batters and striking out seven.

Tauscher next pitched in the major leagues in 1931, appearing in six games for the Washington Senators. Despite posting a 7.50 ERA, Tauscher went 1–0. In 12 innings, he allowed 24 hits and four walks, while striking out five. He appeared in his final big league game on May 5.

Overall, Tauscher went 1–0 with a 5.66 ERA in 23 games. He allowed 52 hits in 41 1/3 innings, walking 16 batters and striking out 12.

== Minor league career ==
Tauscher pitched 23 seasons in the minor leagues, from 1924 to 1927, 1929 to 1946 and in 1948. He was used both as a starter and a reliever, going 263–200 in 867 games. He reached the 15-win mark seven times and the 20-win mark twice, winning a career-high 21 games in 1934.

Tauscher spent 13 of his 23 seasons playing in the American Association, spending nine years with the Minneapolis Millers. While in the American Association, he also pitched for the Indianapolis Indians and St. Paul Saints.

=== Minor league manager ===
Tauscher managed the Meridian Peps (1946), Greenville Pirates (1948–1949), Tallahassee Pirates (1950) and Waco Pirates (1951). He led the Tallahassee Pirates to a league championship in 1950.
