= Dick Hahn =

American baseball player (1916-1992)

- Catcher
- Born: July 24, 1916; Canton, Ohio, U.S.
- Died: November 5, 1992 (aged 76); Orlando, Florida, U.S.
- Batted: Right Threw: Right

MLB debut
- September 7, 1940, for the Washington Senators

Last MLB appearance
- April 26, 1940, for the Washington Senators

MLB statistics
- Games played: 1
- At bats: 3
- Hits: 0
- Stats at Baseball Reference

Teams
- Washington Senators (1940)

Richard Frederick Hahn (July 24, 1916 – November 5, 1992) was an American Major League Baseball catcher. Hahn played for the Washington Senators in 1940. In one career game, he had three career at-bats and did not get a hit.

Hahn was born in Canton, Ohio and died in Orlando, Florida. He was buried in Woodlawn Memorial Park in Gotha, Florida.
