= Evergreen Greenies =

- 1937–1938; Evergreen, Conecuh County, Alabama

Minor league affiliations
- Previous classes: Class D
- League: Alabama–Florida League

Team data
- Previous names: Evergreen Greenies (1937–1938); Ozark Cardinals (1936–1937)

The Evergreen Greenies were a Minor League Baseball team based in Evergreen, Alabama, that played in the Alabama–Florida League from 1937 to 1938. They were originally the Ozark Cardinals based in Ozark, Alabama before moving to Evergreen on Jun 29, 1937.
