= Union Springs Redbirds =

- 1936–1938; Union Springs, Alabama

Minor league affiliations
- Previous classes: Class D
- League: Alabama–Florida League

Team data
- Previous names: Union Springs Redbirds (1938); Union Springs Springs (1937); Union Springs Springers (1936)

The Union Springs Redbirds were a Minor League Baseball team that represented Union Springs, Alabama in the Alabama–Florida League from 1936 to 1938.
