= Andalusia Rams =

- 1936–1962; (1936–1941, 1947–1950, 1953–1954, 1962); Andalusia, Alabama

Minor league affiliations
- Previous classes: Class D
- League: Alabama–Florida League (1953–1954, 1962)
- Previous leagues: Alabama State League (1940–1941, 1947–1950); Alabama–Florida League (1936–1938)

Major league affiliations
- Previous teams: Los Angeles Dodgers (1962)

Minor league titles
- League titles: 2 (1937, 1949)

Team data
- Previous names: Andalusia Dodgers (1962); Andalusia-Opp Indians (1954); Andalusia Arrows (1947–1950, 1953); Andalusia Rams (1939–1941); Andalusia Bulldogs (1937–1938); Andalusia Reds (1936)
- Previous parks: Andalusia Municipal Stadium (1947–1954, 1962); Channell-Lee Park (1954); Fairgrounds Park (1937–1941); Elementary School Park (1936)

The Andalusia Rams (also known as the Bulldogs) was a minor league baseball team based in Andalusia, Alabama, USA that played from 1937 to 1941. They played in the Alabama–Florida League from 1937 to 1939 and the Alabama State League. Brief Major league baseball players Royce Lint, Yam Yaryan and Howie Gorman played for them, along with All-Star pitcher Virgil Trucks .

After World War II, the Andalusia Arrows joined the Alabama State League and played through 1954.

In 1962, the Los Angeles Dodgers moved the Panama City Fliers to Andalusia, where they played as the Andalusia Dodgers until they moved to Ozark, Alabama on July 10.

== The ballparks ==
Andalusia teams played their home games at Andalusia Municipal Stadium (1947–1954, 1962), Channell-Lee Park (1954), Fairgrounds Park (1937–1941) and Elementary School Park (1936).

== Notable alumni ==
- Virgil Trucks (1937) 2x MLB All-Star
