= Abbeville Red Sox =

- 1936; Abbeville, Alabama

Minor league affiliations
- Previous classes: Class D
- League: Alabama–Florida League

The Abbeville Red Sox were a Minor League Baseball team based in Abbeville, Alabama, that played in the Alabama–Florida League in 1936. They were managed by former major leaguer, Monroe Mitchell. The team wore red stirrups. They disbanded on August 10 in their only season of existence.
