= Tony Roig =

American baseball player

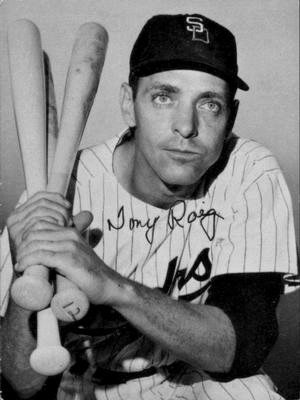
- Infielder
- Born: December 23, 1928; New Orleans, Louisiana, U.S.
- Died: October 20, 2010 (aged 81); Liberty Lake, Washington, U.S.
- Batted: Right Threw: Right

MLB debut
- September 13, 1953, for the Washington Senators

Last MLB appearance
- September 26, 1956, for the Washington Senators

MLB statistics
- Batting average: .212
- Home runs: 0
- Runs batted in: 11

NPB statistics
- Batting average: .255
- Home runs: 126
- Runs batted in: 418
- Stats at Baseball Reference

Teams
- Washington Senators (1953; 1955–1956); Nishitetsu Lions (1963–1967); Kintetsu Buffaloes (1968)

Anton Ambrose Roig (December 23, 1928 – October 20, 2010) was an American utility infielder who played in Major League Baseball between the 1953 and 1956 seasons. Listed at 6 ft 1 in (1.85 m), 180 lb, he batted and threw right-handed.

A native of New Orleans, Louisiana, Roig spent more than a half-century in professional baseball, which included a prominent role with the Spokane Indians of the Pacific Coast League.

== Playing career ==
Basically a shortstop, Roig was able to play at both second and third base during 21 seasons, including parts of three years for the original Washington Senators of the American League, three years with Spokane, and six in Nippon Professional Baseball.

The versatile Roig later managed in the Minor leagues and spent nearly 30 years as a scout for the Milwaukee Brewers, California Angels and Philadelphia Phillies systems, where he also served as their hitting instructor.

Roig signed his first professional contract as a 19-year-old pitcher with the Phillies organization in 1948. Two years later, he was sent by Philadelphia to Washington, where he played in the middle infield and outfield while hitting .327 in 129 games for Class-D Rome Red Sox, then finished the year with Double-A Chattanooga Lookouts.

He divided the next four years between Washington, Chattanooga, Class-A Charlotte Hornets and Triple-A Louisville Colonels.

Shuffled back to Chattanooga for 1957, he hit .300, though an injury limited him to 73 games. At the end of the season, Washington sold Roig to the Los Angeles Dodgers, who assigned him to the Spokane Indians of the Pacific League.

Although the hard-hitting 1960 Spokane produced big-league standouts as Willie Davis and Ron Fairly, fanatics selected Roig as the team's Most Valuable Player. On September 8, 1960, he set a team record in having played every position in a single game.

In 1961 Roig was drafted by the Chicago White Sox, but came down with pneumonia during Spring Training, and that season played minor league ball with Triple-A San Diego Padres.

The next year he played for Triple-A Indianapolis Indians and the Industriales de Valencia of the Venezuelan Winter League.

Roig later played in Japan, where he met the long-ball expectations for American ballplayers by hitting 126 home runs from 1963 to 1968 with the Nishitetsu Lions and Kintetsu Buffaloes of the Pacific League.

In a three-season majors career, Roig was a .212 hitter (39-for-184) in 76 games, driving in 11 runs and scoring 11 times, while collecting seven doubles, two triples, and two stolen bases without a home run, and also hit for a .278 average with 326 homers in 1234 minor league games.

== Manager and scout ==
Besides playing, Roig began his scouting career with the Brewers in 1973. He also managed the Newark Co-Pilots from 1975 to 1976, leading his team to the New York–Penn League championship in 1975. He later scouted for the Angels.

Tony Roig died at his home in Liberty Lake, Washington, at the age of 81.
