= Headland Dixie Runners =

- 1950–1952; Headland, Alabama

Minor league affiliations
- Previous classes: Class D
- League: Alabama–Florida League (1951–1952)
- Previous leagues: Alabama State League (1950)

The Headland Dixie Runners were a Minor League Baseball team based in Headland, Alabama that played in the Alabama State League/Alabama–Florida League from 1950 to 1952.
