= Ozark Eagles =

- 1946–1952; Ozark, Alabama

Minor league affiliations
- Previous classes: Class D
- League: Alabama–Florida League (1951–1952)
- Previous leagues: Alabama State League (1946–1950)

Minor league titles
- League titles: 1952

The Ozark Eagles were a Minor League Baseball team that represented Ozark, Alabama in the Alabama State League and Alabama–Florida League from 1946 to 1952.
