= Panama City Fliers =

- 1935–1962; (1935–1939, 1951–1962); Panama City, Florida

Minor league affiliations
- Previous classes: Class D
- League: Alabama–Florida League (1936–1939, 1951–1962)
- Previous leagues: Georgia–Florida League (1935)

Major league affiliations
- Previous teams: Los Angeles Dodgers (1959–1961); San Francisco Giants (1958); Detroit Tigers (1955–1956); Washington Senators (1935)

Minor league titles
- League titles: 2 (1955, 1957)

Team data
- Previous names: Ozark Dodgers (1962); Andalusia Dodgers (1962); Panama City Fliers (1951–1961); Panama City Pelicans (1937–1939); Panama City Papermakers (1936); Panama City Pilots (1935)
- Previous parks: Lions Field

The Panama City Fliers were a minor league baseball team based in Panama City, Florida, that operated in the Alabama–Florida League. They were founded in 1951 as an affiliate of the Detroit Tigers. In 1958, they were affiliated with the San Francisco Giants and they ended up as an affiliate of the Los Angeles Dodgers. The team won league championships in 1955 and 1957.

The team was moved to Andalusia, Alabama, for the 1962 season and renamed the Andalusia Dodgers. The team was then moved again mid-season to Ozark, Alabama, and renamed again as the Ozark Dodgers. The team folded after that.

From 1936 to 1939, the Panama City Pelicans played also in the Alabama–Florida League.

== Notable alumni ==
- Bobby Cox (1961) Inducted Baseball Hall of Fame, 2014
- Jimmy Bloodworth (1935)
- Ken Chase (1935)
- Roy Hartsfield (1960)
- Bob Johnson (1955)
