= Brewton Millers =

- 1940–1950; (1940–1941, 1946–1950); Brewton, Alabama

Minor league affiliations
- Previous classes: Class D
- League: Alabama State League

Major league affiliations
- Previous teams: Washington Senators (1947); Chicago White Sox (1946)

The Brewton Millers were a Minor League Baseball team that represented the city of Brewton, Alabama. They played in the Alabama State League from 1940–1941 and from 1946–1950. A previous team played in Brewton in 1903 in the Interstate League.
