= Dothan Phillies =

- 1915–1962; (1915–1917, 1936–1942, 1946–1956, 1958–1962); Dothan, Alabama

Minor league affiliations
- Previous classes: Class D
- League: Alabama–Florida League (1951–1956, 1958–1962)
- Previous leagues: Alabama State League (1946–1950); Georgia–Florida League (1942); Alabama State League (1940–1941); Alabama–Florida League (1936–1939); Dixie League (1915–1917); Florida–Alabama–Georgia League (1915)

Major league affiliations
- Previous teams: Philadelphia Phillies (1961–1962); St. Louis Cardinals (1953–1956, 1958–1960); St. Louis Browns (1942)

Minor league titles
- League titles: 7 (1940–1941, 1948, 1950–1951 1953, 1958)

Team data
- Previous names: Dothan Phillies (1961–1962); Dothan Cardinals (1955–1956, 1958–1960); Dothan Rebels (1953–1954); Dothan Browns (1937–1942, 1946–1952); Dothan Boll Weevils (1936); Dothan (1915–1917)
- Previous parks: Baker Field, City Park, Stadium Park, Jill Alexander Miracle Field and the Wiregrass Memorial Stadium

The Dothan Phillies (also known as the Cardinals, Rebels, Browns and Boll Weevils) were a Minor League Baseball team that represented the city of Dothan, Alabama. They played in the Alabama–Florida League, Alabama State League and Georgia–Florida League from 1936 to 1942 and 1946–1962. A previous team played in Dothan as a member of the Dixie League from 1915 to 1917.

== The ballpark ==
Dothan teams played at Baker Field, City Park, Stadium Park, Jill Alexander Miracle Field and the Wiregrass Memorial Stadium.

== Notable alumni ==
- Phil Gagliano (1960)
- Mike Marshall (1961) 2 x MLB All-Star; 1974 NL Cy Young Award
- Lance Richbourg (1917)
- Zack Taylor (1917)
