= Geneva Red Birds =

- 1946–1950; Geneva, Alabama

Minor league affiliations
- Class: Class D
- League: Alabama State League

Major league affiliations
- Team: St. Louis Cardinals (1950); Boston Red Sox (1946)

Minor league titles
- League titles: 1 (1946)

Team data
- Ballpark: Municipal Stadium

The Geneva Red Birds were a Minor League Baseball team based in Geneva, Alabama, that played in the Alabama State League from 1946 to 1950. They played at Municipal Stadium in Geneva.
