= Tifton Blue Sox =

- 1949–1955; Tifton, Georgia

Minor league affiliations
- Class: Class D (1949–1955)
- League: Georgia State League (1949–1950); Georgia–Florida League (1951–1955)

Major league affiliations
- Team: Cleveland Indians (1954)

Minor league titles
- League titles (1): 1949
- Wild card berths (4): 1949; 1951; 1952; 1953

Team data
- Name: Tifton Blue Sox (1949–1953); Tifton Indians (1954); Tifton Blue Sox (1955)
- Ballpark: Eve Park (1949–1955)

The Tifton Blue Sox were a minor league baseball team based in Tifton, Georgia. From 1949 to 1955, Tifton played as members of the Class D level Georgia State League (1949–1950) and Georgia–Florida League (1951–1956), winning the 1949 league championship. The Tifton teams hosted home minor league games at Eve Park.

Tifton played the 1954 season as a minor league affiliate of the Cleveland Indians, adopting the "Indians" nickname for that season.

== History ==
=== Georgia State League ===
The Blue Sox were preceded by the 1917 Tifton Tifters, who played the season as members of the Class D level Dixie League, with the league folding during the season.

The Tifton "Blue Sox" resumed minor league play in 1949, as a new franchise in the eight–team Class D level Georgia State League. The Baxley-Hazlehurst Red Sox, Douglas Trojans, Dublin Green Sox, Eastman Dodgers, Fitzgerald Pioneers, Sparta Saints and Vidalia-Lyons Twins joined Tifton in beginning league play on April 18, 1949.

In their first season of play, the Blue Sox won the 1949 Georgia State League championship. The Blue Sox ended the Georgia State League regular season with a 74–63 record to place third, finishing 12.0 games behind the first place Eastman Dodgers. The team was managed by Charles Farrar. In the first round of the playoffs, Tifton Blue Sox beat the Douglas Trojans 3 games to 2 and advanced. In the finals, Tifton defeated the Vidalia-Lyons Twins 4 games to 2 to win the championship.

The 1950 Tifton Blue Sox continued Georgia State League play. Tifton ended the 1950 season with a record of 69–70, placing sixth and finishing the regular season 14.5 games behind the first place Dublin Green Sox. The Blue Sox scored 772 runs and yielded 825 runs during the season. William Barnes and Dave Coble served as managers, as Tifton failed to qualify for the league playoffs.

=== Georgia–Florida League ===
In 1951, the Blue Sox reached the league finals as the franchise continued play as new members of the Class D level Georgia–Florida League. Tifton joined the Albany Cardinals, Americus Rebels, Brunswick Pirates, Cordele A's, Moultrie To-baks, Valdosta Dodgers and Waycross Bears in beginning league play on April 25, 1951.

The Blue Sox ended the 1951 Georgia–Florida League regular season with a 62–63 record. Tifton placed fourth, finished 18½ games behind the first place Valdosta Dodgers and qualified for the playoffs, as Beverly Tschudin served as manager. In the Playoffs, the Blue Sox defeated the Valdosta Dodgers 4 games to 1 and advanced. In the Finals, the Waycross Bears beat the Tifton 4 games to 1 to claim the championship.

The Blue Sox reached the finals for a second straight season in 1952. The Blue Sox ended the Georgia-Florida League regular season with a record of 78–61, placing fourth. Tifton finished 3.0 games behind the first place Valdosta Dodgers, playing the season under managers Greek George, Edmond Dickerman and Parnell Ruark. In the first round of the playoffs, Tifton swept the Valdosta Dodgers in four games. In the Finals, the Albany Cardinals won the championship, sweeping Tifton in four games.

The 1953 Tifton Blue Sox qualified for the Georgia–Florida League playoffs. Tifton ended the 1953 regular season with a record of 84–55, placing third, as Edd Hartness served as manager. The Blue Sox finished 7.0 games behind the first place Thomasville Dodgers. In the first round of the playoffs, the Brunswick Pirates swept the Tifton Blue Sox in four games.

In 1954, Tifton became a minor league affiliate of the Cleveland Indians and adopted the "Indians" nickname for the season. The Tifton Indians ended the 1954 Georgia-Florida League season with a record of 60–80, placing seventh and missing the playoffs, as Edd Hartness returned as manager. The Indians finished 28.0 games behind the first place Brunswick Pirates in the final regular season standings.

The team returned to the "Blue Sox" nickname for the final time in 1955. The Blue Sox missed the playoffs after finishing in seventh place for the second consecutive season. The Blue Sox ended Georgia–Florida League regular season with a record of 59–80 and again finished 28.0 games behind the first place Brunswick Pirates. The Blue Sox scored 641 runs and allowed 735 runs. Paul Eames served as manager.

Tifton played their final season in 1956 as the Tifton Phillies, with the team becoming an affiliate of the Philadelphia Phillies. Tifton, Georgia has not hosted another minor league team.

== The ballpark ==
From 1949 to 1956, the Tifton Blue Sox, Indians and Phillies teams hosted minor league home games at Eve Park. The Eve Park still in use today with four ballfields on the site and the Eve Park original field being the largest. The location is Victory Drive at Baldwin Drive & West 6th Street, Tifton, Georgia.

In nearby Albany, Georgia, the Paul Eames Sports Complex is named for 1955 the Blue Sox manager, who was an Albany resident.

== Timeline ==
Year(s)	# Yrs.	Team	Level	League	Affiliate	Ballpark
1949–1950	2	Tifton Blue Sox	Class D	Georgia State League	None	Eve Park
1951–1953	3	Tifton Blue Sox	Class D	Georgia–Florida League	None	Eve Park
1954	1	Tifton Indians	Class D	Georgia–Florida League	Cleveland Indians	Eve Park
1955	1	Tifton Blue Sox	Class D	Georgia–Florida League	None	Eve Park
1956	1	Tifton Phillies	Class D	Georgia–Florida League	Philadelphia Phillies	Eve Park

== Year–by–year records ==
Year	Record	Finish	Manager	Attend	Playoffs/Notes
1949	74–63	3rd	Charles Farrar	53,846	League champions
1950	69–70	6th	William Barnes / Dave Coble	54,784	Did not qualify
1951	62–63	4th	Beverly Tschudin	48,472	Lost in Finals
1952	78–61	4th	Greek George / Edmond Dickerman / Parnell Ruark	37,805	Lost in finals
1953	60–80	3rd	Edd Hartness	30,143	Lost in 1st round
1954	60–80	7th	Edd Hartness	31,005	Did not qualify
1955	59–80	7th	Paul Eames	38,363	Did not qualify

== Notable alumni ==
- Dave Coble (1950, MGR)
- Greek George (1951; 1952, MGR)
- Don Manno (1950)

== See also ==
- Tifton Blue Sox players
- Tifton Indians players
