= Sandersville Giants =

- 1953–1956; Sandersville, Georgia

Minor league affiliations
- Class: Class D (1953–1956)
- League: Georgia State League (1953–1956)

Major league affiliations
- Team: Milwaukee Braves (1953); New York Giants (1955–1956)

Minor league titles
- League titles (1): 1955
- Wild card berths (2): 1955; 1956

Team data
- Name: Sandersville Wacos (1953–1954); Sandersville Giants (1955–1956)
- Ballpark: Sandersville Baseball Park (1953–1956)

The Sandersville Giants were a minor league baseball team based in Sandersville, Georgia in 1955 and 1956. Playing previously as the Sandersville Wacos in 1953 and 1954, the Sandersville teams played exclusively as members of the Class D level Georgia State League, winning the 1955 league championship. The Sandersville teams hosted home games at the Sandersville Baseball Park.

Sandersville played as a minor league affiliate of the Milwaukee Braves in 1953 and New York Giants in 1955 to 1956.

Baseball Hall of Fame member Willie McCovey played for the 1955 Sandersville Giants in his first professional season and led the Georgia State League in RBI.

== History ==
Sandersville first hosted a minor league baseball team in 1953. Sandersville became a new franchise in the eight–team Class D level Georgia State League, replacing the Fitzgerald Pioneers team in league play. The Douglas Trojans, Dublin Irish, Eastman Dodgers, Hazlehurst-Baxley Cardinals, Jesup Bees, Statesboro Pilots and Vidalia Indians teams joined Sandersville in beginning Georgia State League play on April 20, 1953.

In their first season of minor league play, the Sandersville "Wacos" finished their first season of play with a record of 48–77. Playing as an affiliate of the Milwaukee Braves, the Wacos were managed by Gabby Grant, Parnell Ruark, Luscius Morgan and Julian Morgan, placing sixth in the Georgia State League and finishing 33.0 games behind the first place Hazlehurst-Baxley Cardinals.

In the 1954 season, the Sandersville Wacos finished a distant last in the Georgia State League, which reduced to a six–team league. With a record of 33–97, the Wacos finished 52.5 games behind the league champion Vidalia Indians, placing sixth in the Georgia State League final standings, while playing under managers Dave Madison and Sid West.

In 1955, the franchise became the Sandersville "Giants," as the team became a minor league affiliate of the New York Giants and won a co-championship. The Giants placed second in the Georgia State League regular season standings, finishing 5.5 gases behind the first place Douglas Trojans. The Giants finished the regular season with a record of 60–47 under player/manager Pete Pavlick. In the 1955 playoffs, the Giants defeated the Hazlehurst-Baxley Cardinals 3 games to 1 to advance. In the Finals against the Douglas Trojans, the series was tied at 3 games each. Game 7 was cancelled due to rain and the teams were declared Georgia State League co–champions. Jack Elias of Sandersville led the Georgia State League with a .332 batting average. Pitchers Leo Quatro and Victor Davis led the league with 15 wins and 183 strikeouts, respectively.

Future Baseball Hall of Fame member Willie McCovey played for the 1955 Sandersville Giants and led the league in RBI. Having signed his first professional contract for $175.00 per month, McCovey was 17 years old and in his first professional season out of Mobile, Alabama. McCovey hit .305 with 19 home runs and led the league with 113 RBI in 107 games for Sandersville.

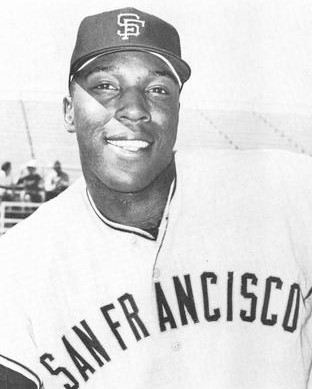
(1965) Hall of Famer Willie McCovey. As a 17–year-old in 1955, McCovey played his first professional season for the Sandersville Giants.

Said McCovey in his 1986 Baseball Hall of Fame acceptance speech: "My first manager in pro ball, Pete Pavlick; Pete was the skipper of the Class D Sandersville Club in the Georgia State League where I broke in, in 1955. He and his wife were the first to adopt me. They used to invite me to their home after the game and became very close to me. I also remember one of my teammates there, his name was Ralph Crosby, he was out of New York. We were the only two black players on that team and we had to stay in separate parts of town back then, so Ralph and I became good friends."

In the Georgia State League's final season of 1956, the Sandersville Giants placed second in the Georgia State League. The Giants finished the regular season with a record of 70–50 under returning player/manager Pete Pavlick and placed second in the regular season standings, finishing 7.0 games behind the first place Douglas Reds. In the first round of the playoffs, Sandersville defeated the Thomson Orioles 3 games to 2. In the last Georgia State League games ever played, the Giants lost to the Douglas Reds 3 games to 1 in the Finals. Frank Reveira of Sandersville led the Georgia State League in batting average, hitting .332, while Giant players Pete Pavlick and Dan Sarver both led the league with 95 runs scored. Sandersville's Al Milley led the Georgia State League with 103 RBI and Giant pitcher Gilbert Bassetti had 21 wins to lead the league.

The Georgia State League permanently folded following the 1956 season. Sandersville, Georgia has not hosted another minor league team.

== The ballpark ==
The Sandersville Wacos and Giants teams played minor league home games at Sandersville Baseball Park. The ballpark was located in Sandersville, Georgia.

== Timeline ==
Year(s)	# Yrs.	Team	Level	League	Affiliate	Ballpark
1953	1	Sandersville Wacos	Class D	Georgia State League	Milwaukee Braves	Sandersville Baseball Park
1954	1	Sandersville Wacos	Class D	Georgia State League	None	Sandersville Baseball Park
1955–1956	2	Sandersville Giants	Class D	Georgia State League	New York Giants	Sandersville Baseball Park

== Year–by–year records ==
Year	Record	Finish	Manager	Attend	Playoffs/Notes
1953	48–77	6th	Gabby Grant / Parnell Ruark / Luscius Morgan / Julian Morgan	33,895	Did not qualify
1954	33–97	6th	Stan West / Dave Madison	25,600	Did not qualify
1955	56–51	2nd	Pete Pavlick	31,005	League Co-Champions
1956	70–50	2nd	Pete Pavlick	31,287	Lost League Finals

== Notable alumni ==
- Willie McCovey (1955) Inducted Baseball Hall of Fame, 1986
- Dave Madison (player/MGR, 1954)
- Julio Navarro (1955)
- Pete Pavlick (1955–1956, MGR)

== External References ==
- Sandersville - Baseball Reference
