= Tallahassee Capitals =

- 1935–1942; (1935–1942, 1946–1951); Tallahassee, Florida

Minor league affiliations
- Previous classes: Class D
- League: Alabama–Florida League (1951)
- Previous leagues: Georgia–Florida League (1935–1942, 1946–1950)

Major league affiliations
- Previous teams: Pittsburgh Pirates (1946–1950); Cleveland Indians (1939); Brooklyn Dodgers (1938); New York Giants (1937)

Minor league titles
- League titles: 3 (1935, 1936, 1950)

Team data
- Previous names: Tallahassee Citizens (1951); Tallahassee Pirates (1946–1950); Tallahassee Capitals (1935–1942)

The Tallahassee Capitals were a Minor League Baseball team, based in Tallahassee, Florida, United States, that operated between 1935 and 1942. Playing as members of the Georgia–Florida League (1935–1942, 1946–1950) and Alabama–Florida League (1951), Tallahassee teams won league championships in 1935, 1936 and 1950.

== History ==
The team originated in the Georgia–Florida League as the Capitals. They had affiliation deals with the New York Giants (1935–1936), Brooklyn Dodgers (1938) and Cleveland Indians (1939). The onset of World War II led to the team temporarily shutting down in 1942.

When the war ended, they reformed as an affiliate of the Pittsburgh Pirates in 1946, now known as the Tallahassee Pirates.

When that agreement ended, they joined the Alabama–Florida League for one last season, in 1951, as the Tallahassee Citizens.

== The ballpark ==
The Capitals played at Centennial Field. Centennial Field was built in 1925 and demolished in 1975. It was located on South Monroe Street just South of the State Capitol Building. Today, the site has been repurposed and hosts a new Centennial Field at Cascades Park, which is on the National Register of Historic Places.

== Notable alumni ==
- Mickey Haefner (1939)
- Phil Seghi (1947)
- Frank Thomas (1948-1949) 3 x MLB All-Star

== Year-by-year records ==
Year	Record	Finish	Manager	Playoffs
1935	67–52	2nd	Ed "Dutch" Hoffman	League champions defeated Albany Travelers 4 games to 3
1936	69–50	1st	Ed "Dutch" Hoffman	League champions defeated Cordele Reds 4 games to 0
1937	51–70	5th	Ed "Dutch" Hoffman	Did not qualify
1938	56–69	4th	Tim Murchison	Lost 1st round to Thomasville Orioles 4 games to 3
1939	69–66	3rd	Ralph McAdams	Lost 1st round to Albany Cardinals 3 games to 1
1940	64–75	6th	Harold Schultz	Did not qualify
1941	47–86	8th	Lance Richbourg	Did not qualify
1942	62–64	5th	Will Good	Did not qualify
1946	63–62	5th	Art Doll	Did not qualify
1947	80–60	3rd	Phil Seghi	Won 1st round vs. Waycross Bears 3 games to 2 Lost League Finals to Moultrie Packers 4 games to 2
1948	70–69	4th	Jack Rothrock	Lost 1st round to Waycross Bears 3 games to 1
1949	49–89	8th	Norman Veazey / Bob Shawkey / Johnnie Heving / Gene Cabaniss	Did not qualify
1950	77–58	3rd	Walt Tauscher	Won 1st round vs. Valdosta Dodgers 4 games to 3 League Champs vs. Americus Phillies 4 games to 1
1951	65–52	3rd	Charles Quimby	Won in 1st round vs. Headland Dixie Runners 4 games to 3 Lost League finals to Dothan Browns 4 games to 3
