= Sparta Saints =

- 1948–1949; Sparta, Georgia

Minor league affiliations
- Class: Class D (1948–1949)
- League: Georgia State League (1948–1949)

Major league affiliations
- Team: None

Minor league titles
- League titles (0): None
- Conference titles (1): 1948

Team data
- Name: Sparta Saints (1948–1949)
- Ballpark: Sparta Baseball Park

The Sparta Saints were a minor league baseball team based in Sparta, Georgia. From 1948 to 1949, the Saints played exclusively as members of the Class D level Georgia State League, winning the 1948 league pennant. The Saints hosted minor league home games at the Sparta Baseball Park.

== History ==
Sparta, Georgia first hosted minor league play in 1948, when the Sparta "Saints" became charter members of the reformed in the six–team Class D level Georgia State League. The Baxley Red Sox, Douglas Rebels, Eastman Dodgers, Fitzgerald Pioneers and Vidalia-Lyons Twins joined Sparta in beginning league play on May 6, 1948.

In their first season of play, the 1948 Sparta Saints finished first in the regular season standings, winning the league pennant with an 81–37 record under player/manager Woody Bottoms. They finished 16.0 games ahead of the second-place Baxley Red Sox. In the playoffs, Sparta defeated the Eastman Dodgers 3 games to 2 to advance to the Finals, where they were narrowly defeated by the Fitzgerald Pioneers 4 games to 3.

Player/manager Woody Bottoms led the league in batting average, hitting .375 and Sparta teammate Alan Swygert led the Georgia State League with 88 RBI. Sparta pitcher Paul Brock led the league with both 21 wins and 270 strikeouts. Player/manager Woody Bottoms led the league in batting average, hitting .375 and Sparta teammate Alan Swygert led the Georgia State League with 88 RBI. Sparta pitcher Paul Brock led the league with both 21 wins and 270 strikeouts.

In their second and final season in 1949, the Saints missed the playoffs, placing fifth in the eight–team Georgia State League regular season standings. Sparta ended the season with a record of 69–68, playing under managers Woody Bottoms and Parnell Ruark. The Saints finished their final season 17.0 games behind the first place Eastman Dodgers in the regular season standings. James Stoyle of Sparta won the Georgia State League batting title with an average of .400 and also led the league with 191 total hits.

Sparta had total home attendance of 33,436 and 27,191 in their two seasons of play. The Saints franchise folded after the 1949 season, replaced by the Jesup Bees franchise in 1950 Georgia State League play. The Georgia State League eventually folded following the completion of the 1956 season. Sparta, Georgia has not hosted another minor league team.

== The ballpark ==
The Sparta Saints played home minor league games at the Sparta Baseball Park. The Sparta Baseball Park had a capacity of 2,000. Today, the ballpark still in use, hosting youth teams. The original grandstands remain.

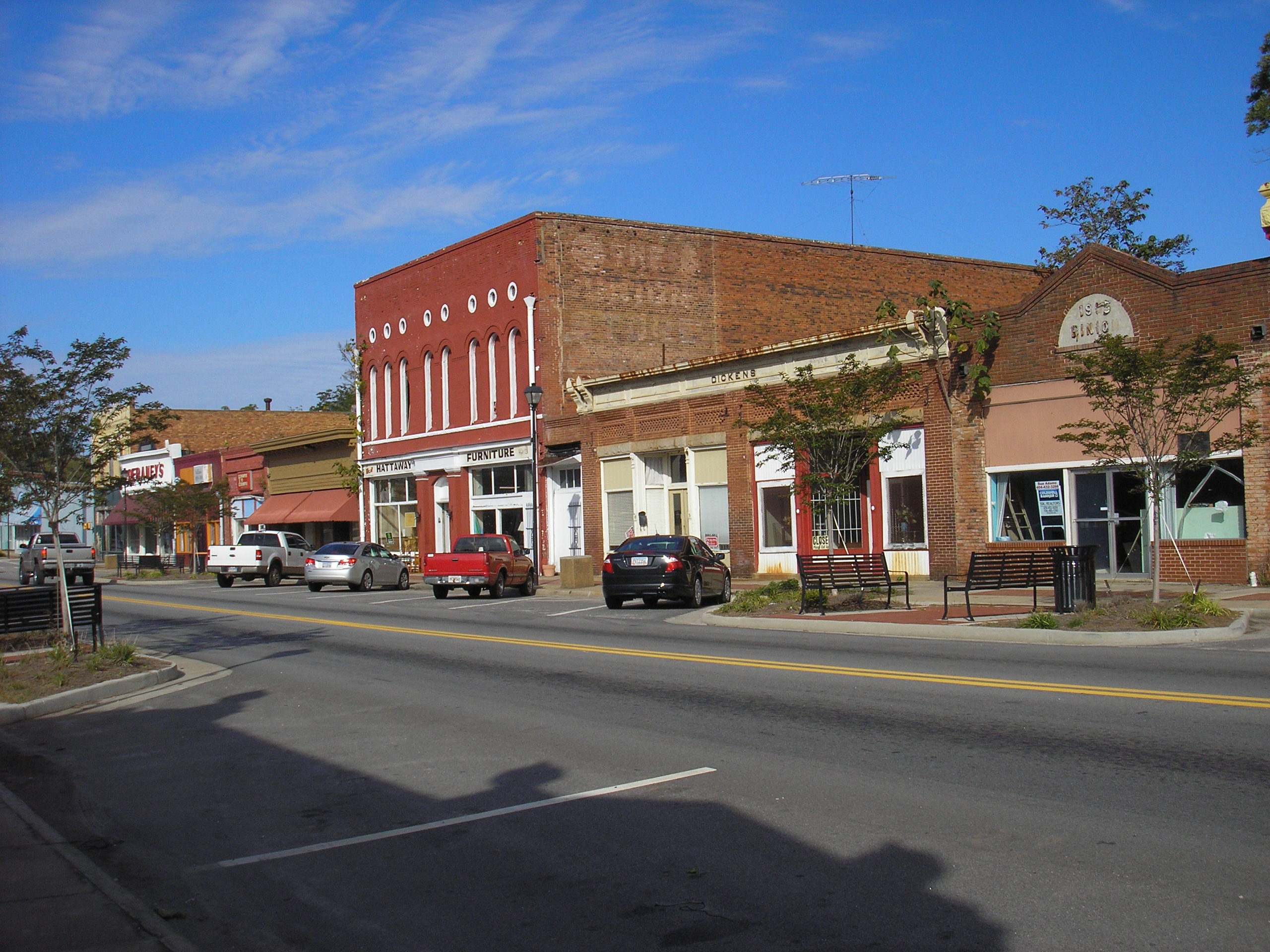
(2014) Sparta Historic District. National Register of Historic Places. Sparta, Georgia.

== Timeline ==
| Year(s) | # Yrs. | Team | Level | League | Ballpark |
|---|---|---|---|---|---|
| 1948–1949 | 2 | Sparta Saints | Class D | Georgia State League | Sparta Baseball Park |

== Year–by–year records ==
| Year | Record | Finish | Manager | Playoffs/Notes |
|---|---|---|---|---|
| 1948 | 81–37 | 1st | Woody Bottoms | Lost League Finals |
| 1949 | 69–68 | 5th | Woody Bottoms / J.B. Ruark | Did not qualify |

== Notable alumni ==
- Izzy Leon (1948)
