= Valdosta Tigers =

- 1939–1958; (1939–1942, 1946–1958); Valdosta, Georgia

Minor league affiliations
- Previous classes: Class D
- League: Georgia–Florida League

Major league affiliations
- Previous teams: Detroit Tigers (1954–1958); St. Louis Browns (1953); Brooklyn Dodgers (1941–1942, 1946–1952); Non-Affiliated (1940); Pittsburgh Pirates (1939)

Minor league titles
- League titles (2): 1956; 1958

Team data
- Previous names: Valdosta Tigers (1954–1958); Valdosta Browns (1953); Valdosta Dodgers (1946–1952); Valdosta Trojans (1939–1942)
- Previous parks: Pendleton Park

The Valdosta Tigers were a "Class-D" minor league baseball team, based in Valdosta, Georgia, that operated in the Georgia–Florida League, from 1939 to 1958. The club played its home games at Pendleton Park, which was located on the current site of South Georgia Medical Center.

== History ==
They club through a number of affiliations and names during their existence. The team was originally an affiliate of the Pittsburgh Pirates affiliate, known as the Valdosta Trojans. In 1941, the team became an affiliate for the Los Angeles Dodgers. The team folded in 1942, however after World War II ended, Valdosta received another team in the Georgia–Florida League, the Valdosta Dodgers, which was once again affiliated with the Brooklyn Dodgers.

In 1953, the Dodgers moved their operations to Thomasville, to become the Thomasville Dodgers. However, the St. Louis Browns took over the Valdosta team, which was then renamed the Valdosta Browns. A year later, the Browns left and the Detroit Tigers moved their Georgia–Florida League team to Valdosta. The renamed Valdosta Tigers then played from 1954 to 1958.

== The ballpark ==
Valdosta teams played at Pendleton Park which was located on Woodrow Wilson Drive, at a site near the city library and South Georgia Medical Center."

== Notable alumni ==
- Bud Clancy (1942)
- Roger Craig (1950)
- Fred Gladding (1956-1957)
- Don Hoak (1947) MLB All-Star
- Bob Johnson (1955)
- Turk Lown (1942)
- Dick McAuliffe (1958) 3 x MLB All-Star
- Stubby Overmire (1958)
- Marv Owen (1954)
- Eddie Robinson (1939-1940) 4 x MLB All-Star
- Zack Taylor (1915)
- John Tsitouris (1954-1955)
- Don Wert (1958) MLB All-Star

== Seasons ==
Year	Record	Finish	Manager	Playoff Series'
1939	73-63	2nd	Bill Morrell	Won First Round vs. Waycross Bears (3-2); Lost League Finals vs. Albany Cardinals (4-0)
1940	76-61	3rd	Bill Morrell	Lost in 1st round vs. Waycross Bears (3-0)
1941	85-51	2nd	Stew Hofferth	Lost in 1st round vs. Thomasville Lookouts (3-1)
1942	81-45	1st	Stew Hofferth / Clancy Odell	Won First Round vs. Moultrie Packers (3-1); Lost League Finals vs. Waycross Bears (4-1)
1946	64-61	4th	Bill Welp	Lost in 1st round vs. Moultrie Packers (3-1)
1947	54-84	7th	Hugh Holliday	Did not qualify
1948	81-58	2nd	Lou Rochelli	Lost in 1st round vs. Albany Cardinals (3-1)
1949	86-54	2nd	Doc Alexson	Lost in 1st round vs. Waycross Bears (3-0)
1950	81-56	2nd	Stan Wasiak	Lost in 1st round vs. Tallahassee Pirates (4-3)
1951	81-45	1st	Stan Wasiak	Lost in 1st round vs. Tifton Blue Sox (4-1)
1952	81-58	1st	John Angelone	Won 1-Game Playoff vs. Waycross Bears (1-0); Lost in 1st round vs. Tifton Blue Sox (4-0)
1953	55-81	7th	Rollie Stuckmeyer / Gil Torres	Did not qualify
1954	68-70	5th	Marv Owen (29-52) / Stan Wasiak (39-28)	Did not qualify
1955	68-70	4th	Stan Wasiak	Lost in 1st round vs. Brunswick Pirates (3-2)
1956	94-45	1st	Bill Adair	League Champs; No playoff system
1957	77-62	2nd	Stan Wasiak	Lost League Finals vs. Albany Cardinals (3-2)
1958	75-52	2nd	Stubby Overmire	League Champs vs. Albany Cardinals (3-1)
