= List of Philadelphia Phillies minor league affiliates =

Current Philadelphia Phillies northeastern minor league affiliate locations

The Philadelphia Phillies farm system consists of six Minor League Baseball affiliates across the United States and in the Dominican Republic. Three teams are owned by the major league club, while three—the Lehigh Valley IronPigs, Reading Fightin Phils, and Jersey Shore BlueClaws—are independently owned.

== History ==
On April 14, 1934, the Phillies entered into their first affiliation agreement with the New York–Penn League Hazleton Mountaineers. The Phillies have been affiliated with the High-A Jersey Shore BlueClaws of the South Atlantic League since 2001, making it the longest-running active affiliation in the organization among teams not owned by the Phillies. Their newest affiliate is the Lehigh Valley IronPigs of the International League, which became the Phillies' Triple-A club in 2008.

== Geography ==
Geographically, the Phillies' closest domestic affiliate is the Lehigh Valley IronPigs, which play at Coca-Cola Park in Allentown, Pennsylvania, approximately 58 miles (93 km) north-northwest of Philadelphia. Their furthest domestic affiliates are the Single-A Clearwater Threshers of the Florida State League and Rookie Florida Complex League Phillies of the Florida Complex League, who play at adjacent ballparks some 1,049 miles (1,688 km) away in Clearwater, Florida.

== Current affiliates ==
The Philadelphia Phillies farm system consists of six minor league affiliates.

Class	Team	League	Location	Ballpark	Affiliated
Triple-A	Lehigh Valley IronPigs	International League	Allentown, Pennsylvania	Coca-Cola Park	2008
Double-A	Reading Fightin Phils	Eastern League	Reading, Pennsylvania	FirstEnergy Stadium	1967
High-A	Jersey Shore BlueClaws	South Atlantic League	Lakewood, New Jersey	ShoreTown Ballpark	2001
Single-A	Clearwater Threshers	Florida State League	Clearwater, Florida	BayCare Ballpark	1985
Rookie	FCL Phillies	Florida Complex League	Clearwater, Florida	Carpenter Complex	2021
Rookie	DSL Phillies	Dominican Summer League	Santo Domingo, Distrito Nacional	Philadelphia Phillies Complex	2017

== Past affiliates ==
=== Key ===
Season	Each year is linked to an article about that particular Phillies season.

=== 1934–1962 ===
Minor League Baseball operated with five classes (Double-A, Class A, Class B, Class C, and Class D) from 1934 to 1935. Class A1, between Double-A and Class A, was added in 1936. The minors continued to operate with these six levels through 1945. Triple-A was established as the highest classification in 1946, and Class A1 became Double-A, with Class A through D remaining. These six levels continued through 1962. The Pacific Coast League (PCL) was reclassified from Triple-A to Open in 1952 due to the possibility of becoming a third major league. This arrangement ended following the 1957 season when the relocation of the National League's Dodgers and Giants to the West Coast ended any chance of the PCL being promoted.

Season	Triple-A	Double-A	Class A	Class B	Class C	Class D	Ref.
1934	—	—	Hazleton Mountaineers	—	—	—	
1935	—	—	Hazleton Mountaineers	—	—	—	
1936	—	—	Hazleton Mountaineers	—	—	—	
1937	—	—	—	—	—	—	
1938	—	—	—	Montgomery Rebels	—	Centreville Colts	
1939	—	—	—	Pensacola Pilots; Portsmouth Cubs	—	Johnstown Johnnies; Mayodan Millers; Moultrie Packers	
1940	—	Baltimore Orioles	—	Pensacola Pilots; Portsmouth Cubs	Ottawa-Ogdensburg Senators	Dover Orioles; Martinsville Manufacturers; Moultrie Packers; Wausau Timberjacks	
1941	—	—	—	Allentown Wings	Wausau Timberjacks	Martinsville Manufacturers	
1942	—	—	—	Trenton Packers	Rome Colonels	—	
1943	—	—	Utica Braves	Trenton Packers	—	—	
1944	—	—	Utica Blue Sox	Wilmington Blue Rocks	—	Bradford Blue Wings	
1945	—	—	Utica Blue Sox	Wilmington Blue Rocks	Greensboro Patriots	Bradford Blue Wings; Concord Weavers	
1946	—	—	Utica Blue Sox	Terre Haute Phillies; Wilmington Blue Rocks	Salina Blue Jays; Schenectady Blue Jays	Americus Phillies; Bradford Blue Wings; Dover Phillies; Green Bay Bluejays	
1947	—	—	Utica Blue Sox	Terre Haute Phillies; Wilmington Blue Rocks	Salina Blue Jays; Schenectady Blue Jays; Vandergrift Pioneers	Americus Phillies; Appleton Papermakers; Bradford Blue Wings; Carbondale Pioneers; Dover Phillies	
1948	Toronto Maple Leafs	—	Utica Blue Sox	Portland Pilots; Terre Haute Phillies; Wilmington Blue Rocks	Salina Blue Jays; Schenectady Blue Jays; Vandergrift Pioneers	Americus Phillies; Appleton Papermakers; Baton Rouge Red Sticks; Bradford Blue Wings; Carbondale Pioneers; Dover Phillies; Klamath Falls Gems	
1949	Toronto Maple Leafs	—	Utica Blue Sox	Portland Pilots; Terre Haute Phillies; Wilmington Blue Rocks	Salina Blue Jays; Schenectady Blue Jays; Vandergrift Pioneers	Americus Phillies; Appleton Papermakers; Bradford Blue Wings; Carbondale Pioneers; Klamath Falls Gems; Pulaski Counts; Seaford Eagles	
1950	Toronto Maple Leafs	—	Utica Blue Sox	Terre Haute Phillies; Wilmington Blue Rocks	Salina Blue Jays; Schenectady Blue Jays; Vandergrift Pioneers	Americus Phillies; Bradford Phillies; Carbondale Pioneers; Klamath Falls Gems; Lima Phillies	
1951	Baltimore Orioles	—	Schenectady Blue Jays	Terre Haute Phillies; Wilmington Blue Rocks	Grand Forks Chiefs; Salina Blue Jays; Salt Lake City Bees; Pittsfield Phillies	Bradford Phillies; Elizabethton Phils; Klamath Falls Gems; Lima Phillies	
1952	Baltimore Orioles	—	Schenectady Blue Jays; Tri-City Braves	Terre Haute Phillies; Wilmington Blue Rocks	Granby Phillies; Grand Forks Chiefs; Salina Blue Jays; Salt Lake City Bees	Bradford Phillies; Miami Eagles; Pulaski Phillies	
1953	Baltimore Orioles	—	Schenectady Blue Jays; Spokane Indians	Terre Haute Phillies	Granby Phillies; Salt Lake City Bees	Bradford Phillies; Mattoon Phillies; Pulaski Phillies	
1954	Syracuse Chiefs	—	Salem Senators; Schenectady Blue Jays	Terre Haute Phillies	Salt Lake City Bees; Trois-Rivières Phillies	Bradford Phillies; Mattoon Phillies; Pulaski Phillies	
1955	Syracuse Chiefs	—	Schenectady Blue Jays	Reidsville Phillies	Salt Lake City Bees; Trois-Rivières Phillies	Bradford Phillies; Mattoon Phillies; Pulaski Phillies	
1956	Miami Marlins	—	Schenectady Blue Jays	Wilson Tobs	Bakersfield Boosters; Salt Lake City Bees	Mattoon Phillies; Olean Oilers; Tifton Phillies	
1957	Miami Marlins	Tulsa Oilers	Schenectady Blue Jays	High Point-Thomasville Hi-Toms; Lewiston Broncos	Salt Lake City Bees	Johnson City Phillies; Moultrie Phillies / Brunswick Phillies; Olean Oilers; Tampa Tarpons	
1958	Miami Marlins	Tulsa Oilers	Williamsport Grays	High Point-Thomasville Hi-Toms	Bakersfield Bears	Brunswick Phillies; Johnson City Phillies; Olean Oilers; Tampa Tarpons	
1959	Buffalo Bisons	—	Asheville Tourists; Williamsport Grays	Des Moines Demons	Bakersfield Bears	Elmira Pioneers; Johnson City Phillies; Tampa Tarpons	
1960	Buffalo Bisons; Indianapolis Indians	Chattanooga Lookouts	Asheville Tourists; Williamsport Grays	Des Moines Demons	Bakersfield Bears	Elmira Pioneers; Johnson City Phillies; Tampa Tarpons	
1961	Buffalo Bisons	Chattanooga Lookouts	Williamsport Grays	Des Moines Demons	Bakersfield Bears; Magic Valley Cowboys	Dothan Phillies; Elmira Pioneers	
1962	Buffalo Bisons; Dallas-Fort Worth Rangers	—	Williamsport Grays	—	Bakersfield Bears; Magic Valley Cowboys	Dothan Phillies; Miami Marlins	

=== 1963–1989 ===
Prior to the 1963 season, Major League Baseball (MLB) initiated a reorganization of Minor League Baseball that resulted in a reduction from six classes to four (Triple-A, Double-A, Class A, and Rookie) in response to the general decline of the minors throughout the 1950s and early-1960s when leagues and teams folded due to shrinking attendance caused by baseball fans' preference for staying at home to watch MLB games on television. The only change made within the next 27 years was Class A being subdivided for the first time to form Class A Short Season in 1966.

Season	Triple-A	Double-A	Class A	Class A Short Season	Rookie	Ref.
1963	Arkansas Travelers	Chattanooga Lookouts	Bakersfield Bears; Magic Valley Cowboys; Miami Marlins; Spartanburg Phillies	—	—	
1964	Arkansas Travelers	Chattanooga Lookouts	Bakersfield Bears; Miami Marlins; Spartanburg Phillies	—	—	
1965	Arkansas Travelers	Chattanooga Lookouts	Bakersfield Bears; Eugene Emeralds; Huron Phillies; Miami Marlins; Spartanburg Phillies	—	—	
1966	San Diego Padres	Macon Peaches	Bakersfield Bears; Spartanburg Phillies; Tidewater Tides	Huron Phillies	—	
1967	San Diego Padres	Reading Phillies	Bakersfield Bears; Spartanburg Phillies; Tidewater Tides	Batavia Trojans; Eugene Emeralds; Huron Phillies	—	
1968	San Diego Padres	Reading Phillies	Spartanburg Phillies; Tidewater Tides	Eugene Emeralds; Huron Phillies	—	
1969	Eugene Emeralds	Reading Phillies	Raleigh-Durham Phillies; Spartanburg Phillies	Walla Walla Bears	Pulaski Phillies	
1970	Eugene Emeralds	Reading Phillies	Peninsula Phillies; Spartanburg Phillies	Walla Walla Phillies	Pulaski Phillies	
1971	Eugene Emeralds	Reading Phillies	Peninsula Phillies; Spartanburg Phillies	Walla Walla Phillies	Pulaski Phillies	
1972	Eugene Emeralds	Reading Phillies	Spartanburg Phillies	Auburn Phillies	Pulaski Phillies	
1973	Eugene Emeralds	Reading Phillies	Rocky Mount Phillies; Spartanburg Phillies	Auburn Phillies	Pulaski Phillies	
1974	Toledo Mud Hens	Reading Phillies	Rocky Mount Phillies; Spartanburg Phillies	Auburn Phillies	Pulaski Phillies	
1975	Toledo Mud Hens	Reading Phillies	Rocky Mount Phillies; Spartanburg Phillies	Auburn Phillies	Pulaski Phillies	
1976	Oklahoma City 89ers	Reading Phillies	Peninsula Pilots; Spartanburg Phillies	Auburn Phillies	—	
1977	Oklahoma City 89ers	Reading Phillies	Peninsula Pilots; Spartanburg Phillies	Auburn Phillies	—	
1978	Oklahoma City 89ers	Reading Phillies	Peninsula Pilots; Spartanburg Phillies	Auburn Sunsets	Helena Phillies	
1979	Oklahoma City 89ers	Reading Phillies	Peninsula Pilots; Spartanburg Phillies	Central Oregon Phillies	Helena Phillies	
1980	Oklahoma City 89ers	Reading Phillies	Peninsula Pilots; Spartanburg Phillies	Central Oregon Phillies	Helena Phillies	
1981	Oklahoma City 89ers	Reading Phillies	Peninsula Pilots; Spartanburg Phillies	Bend Phillies	Helena Phillies	
1982	Oklahoma City 89ers	Reading Phillies	Peninsula Pilots; Spartanburg Traders	Bend Phillies	Helena Phillies	
1983	Portland Beavers	Reading Phillies	Peninsula Pilots; Spartanburg Spinners	Bend Phillies	Helena Phillies	
1984	Portland Beavers	Reading Phillies	Peninsula Pilots; Spartanburg Suns	Bend Phillies	GCL Phillies	
1985	Portland Beavers	Reading Phillies	Clearwater Phillies; Peninsula Pilots; Spartanburg Suns	Bend Phillies	—	
1986	Portland Beavers	Reading Phillies	Clearwater Phillies; Spartanburg Phillies	Bend Phillies; Utica Blue Sox	—	
1987	Maine Guides	Reading Phillies	Clearwater Phillies; Spartanburg Phillies	Bend Phillies; Utica Blue Sox	—	
1988	Maine Phillies	Reading Phillies	Clearwater Phillies; Spartanburg Phillies	Batavia Clippers	Martinsville Phillies	
1989	Scranton/Wilkes-Barre Red Barons	Reading Phillies	Clearwater Phillies; Spartanburg Phillies	Batavia Clippers	Martinsville Phillies	

=== 1990–2020 ===
Minor League Baseball operated with six classes from 1990 to 2020. In 1990, the Class A level was subdivided for a second time with the creation of Class A-Advanced. The Rookie level consisted of domestic and foreign circuits.

Season	Triple-A	Double-A	Class A-Advanced	Class A	Class A Short Season	Rookie	Foreign Rookie	Ref.
1990	Scranton/Wilkes-Barre Red Barons	Reading Phillies	Clearwater Phillies	Spartanburg Phillies	Batavia Clippers	Martinsville Phillies; Princeton Patriots (Note: In 1990, the Princeton Patriots were a co-op team.)	—	
1991	Scranton/Wilkes-Barre Red Barons	Reading Phillies	Clearwater Phillies	Spartanburg Phillies	Batavia Clippers	Martinsville Phillies	—	
1992	Scranton/Wilkes-Barre Red Barons	Reading Phillies	Clearwater Phillies	Spartanburg Phillies	Batavia Clippers	Martinsville Phillies	—	
1993	Scranton/Wilkes-Barre Red Barons	Reading Phillies	Clearwater Phillies	Spartanburg Phillies	Batavia Clippers	Martinsville Phillies	DSL Phillies/Giants/Astros	
1994	Scranton/Wilkes-Barre Red Barons	Reading Phillies	Clearwater Phillies	Spartanburg Phillies	Batavia Clippers	Martinsville Phillies	DSL Phillies/Cardinals	
1995	Scranton/Wilkes-Barre Red Barons	Reading Phillies	Clearwater Phillies	Piedmont Phillies	Batavia Clippers	Martinsville Phillies	DSL Phillies/Cardinals	
1996	Scranton/Wilkes-Barre Red Barons	Reading Phillies	Clearwater Phillies	Piedmont Boll Weevils	Batavia Clippers	Martinsville Phillies	DSL Phillies	
1997	Scranton/Wilkes-Barre Red Barons	Reading Phillies	Clearwater Phillies	Piedmont Boll Weevils	Batavia Clippers	Martinsville Phillies	DSL Phillies	
1998	Scranton/Wilkes-Barre Red Barons	Reading Phillies	Clearwater Phillies	Piedmont Boll Weevils	Batavia Muckdogs	Martinsville Phillies	DSL Phillies	
1999	Scranton/Wilkes-Barre Red Barons	Reading Phillies	Clearwater Phillies	Piedmont Boll Weevils	Batavia Muckdogs	GCL Phillies	DSL Phillies	
2000	Scranton/Wilkes-Barre Red Barons	Reading Phillies	Clearwater Phillies	Piedmont Boll Weevils	Batavia Muckdogs	GCL Phillies	DSL Phillies	
2001	Scranton/Wilkes-Barre Red Barons	Reading Phillies	Clearwater Phillies	Lakewood BlueClaws	Batavia Muckdogs	GCL Phillies	DSL Phillies	
2002	Scranton/Wilkes-Barre Red Barons	Reading Phillies	Clearwater Phillies	Lakewood BlueClaws	Batavia Muckdogs	GCL Phillies	DSL Phillies; VSL Mariara	
2003	Scranton/Wilkes-Barre Red Barons	Reading Phillies	Clearwater Phillies	Lakewood BlueClaws	Batavia Muckdogs	GCL Phillies	DSL Phillies; VSL Mariara	
2004	Scranton/Wilkes-Barre Red Barons	Reading Phillies	Clearwater Threshers	Lakewood BlueClaws	Batavia Muckdogs	GCL Phillies	DSL Phillies; VSL Tronconero 1	
2005	Scranton/Wilkes-Barre Red Barons	Reading Phillies	Clearwater Threshers	Lakewood BlueClaws	Batavia Muckdogs	GCL Phillies	DSL Phillies; VSL Phillies	
2006	Scranton/Wilkes-Barre Red Barons	Reading Phillies	Clearwater Threshers	Lakewood BlueClaws	Batavia Muckdogs	GCL Phillies	DSL Phillies; VSL Phillies	
2007	Ottawa Lynx	Reading Phillies	Clearwater Threshers	Lakewood BlueClaws	Williamsport Crosscutters	GCL Phillies	DSL Phillies; VSL Phillies	
2008	Lehigh Valley IronPigs	Reading Phillies	Clearwater Threshers	Lakewood BlueClaws	Williamsport Crosscutters	GCL Phillies	DSL Phillies; VSL Phillies	
2009	Lehigh Valley IronPigs	Reading Phillies	Clearwater Threshers	Lakewood BlueClaws	Williamsport Crosscutters	GCL Phillies	DSL Phillies; VSL Phillies	
2010	Lehigh Valley IronPigs	Reading Phillies	Clearwater Threshers	Lakewood BlueClaws	Williamsport Crosscutters	GCL Phillies	DSL Phillies; VSL Phillies	
2011	Lehigh Valley IronPigs	Reading Phillies	Clearwater Threshers	Lakewood BlueClaws	Williamsport Crosscutters	GCL Phillies	DSL Phillies; VSL Phillies	
2012	Lehigh Valley IronPigs	Reading Phillies	Clearwater Threshers	Lakewood BlueClaws	Williamsport Crosscutters	GCL Phillies	DSL Phillies; VSL Phillies	
2013	Lehigh Valley IronPigs	Reading Fightin Phils	Clearwater Threshers	Lakewood BlueClaws	Williamsport Crosscutters	GCL Phillies	DSL Phillies; VSL Phillies	
2014	Lehigh Valley IronPigs	Reading Fightin Phils	Clearwater Threshers	Lakewood BlueClaws	Williamsport Crosscutters	GCL Phillies	DSL Phillies; VSL Phillies	
2015	Lehigh Valley IronPigs	Reading Fightin Phils	Clearwater Threshers	Lakewood BlueClaws	Williamsport Crosscutters	GCL Phillies	DSL Phillies; VSL Phillies	
2016	Lehigh Valley IronPigs	Reading Fightin Phils	Clearwater Threshers	Lakewood BlueClaws	Williamsport Crosscutters	GCL Phillies	DSL Phillies 1 DSL Phillies 2	
2017	Lehigh Valley IronPigs	Reading Fightin Phils	Clearwater Threshers	Lakewood BlueClaws	Williamsport Crosscutters	GCL Phillies	DSL Phillies Red; DSL Phillies White	
2018	Lehigh Valley IronPigs	Reading Fightin Phils	Clearwater Threshers	Lakewood BlueClaws	Williamsport Crosscutters	GCL Phillies East; GCL Phillies West	DSL Phillies Red; DSL Phillies White	
2019	Lehigh Valley IronPigs	Reading Fightin Phils	Clearwater Threshers	Lakewood BlueClaws	Williamsport Crosscutters	GCL Phillies East; GCL Phillies West	DSL Phillies Red; DSL Phillies White	
2020 (Note: The 2020 Minor League Baseball season was cancelled due to the COVID-19 pandemic.)	Lehigh Valley IronPigs	Reading Fightin Phils	Clearwater Threshers	Lakewood BlueClaws	Williamsport Crosscutters	GCL Phillies East; GCL Phillies West	DSL Phillies Red; DSL Phillies White	

=== 2021–present ===
The current structure of Minor League Baseball is the result of an overall contraction of the system beginning with the 2021 season. Class A was reduced to two levels: High-A and Low-A. Low-A was reclassified as Single-A in 2022.

Season	Triple-A	Double-A	High-A	Single-A	Rookie	Foreign Rookie	Ref.
2021	Lehigh Valley IronPigs	Reading Fightin Phils	Jersey Shore BlueClaws	Clearwater Threshers	FCL Phillies	DSL Phillies Red; DSL Phillies White	
2022	Lehigh Valley IronPigs	Reading Fightin Phils	Jersey Shore BlueClaws	Clearwater Threshers	FCL Phillies	DSL Phillies Red; DSL Phillies White	
2023	Lehigh Valley IronPigs	Reading Fightin Phils	Jersey Shore BlueClaws	Clearwater Threshers	FCL Phillies	DSL Phillies Red; DSL Phillies White	
2024	Lehigh Valley IronPigs	Reading Fightin Phils	Jersey Shore BlueClaws	Clearwater Threshers	FCL Phillies	DSL Phillies Red; DSL Phillies White	
2025	Lehigh Valley IronPigs	Reading Fightin Phils	Jersey Shore BlueClaws	Clearwater Threshers	FCL Phillies	DSL Phillies Red; DSL Phillies White	
2026	Lehigh Valley IronPigs	Reading Fightin Phils	Jersey Shore BlueClaws	Clearwater Threshers	FCL Phillies	DSL Phillies	
