= Statesboro Pilots =

- 1952–1955; Statesboro, Georgia

Minor league affiliations
- Class: Class D
- League: Georgia State League (1952–1955)

Major league affiliations
- Team: None

Minor league titles
- League titles (0): None
- Wild card berths (1): 1954

Team data
- Name: Statesboro Pilots (1952–1955)
- Ballpark: Pilots Field (1952–1955)

The Statesboro Pilots were a minor league baseball team based in Statesboro, Georgia. From 1952 to 1955, the Pilots played exclusively as members of the Class D level Georgia State League. The Pilots hosted minor league home games at Pilots Field.

== History ==
A semi-pro team called the "Statesboro Pilots" began play in 1947 and played through 1951 as a member of the Ogeechee Baseball League. The team was formed after the Statesboro Athletic Association was established to organize a team for Statesboro. The Statesboro Athletic Association also built a new ballpark for the Pilots at a cost of $30,000, with a seating capacity of 1,500. The "Pilots" moniker was selected due to the ballpark being close to the local airport.

In 1952, the Statesboro Pilots began minor league play, becoming members of the eight–team, Class D level Georgia State League. The Douglas Trojans, Dublin Green Sox, Eastman Dodgers, Fitzgerald Pioneers, Hazlehurst-Baxley Cardinals, Jesup Bees and Vidalia Indians joined Statesboro in beginning league play on April 21, 1952.

The use of the "Pilots" moniker corresponds to the local aviation industry, with a local military airport and related flight training in the era. Statesboro remains home to the Statesboro–Bulloch County Airport and numerous flight schools.

The Pilots had records of 39–56 in 1952, 59–77 in 1953, 57–73 in 1954 and 25–40 in 1955, never finishing above fourth place in the league standings and losing their only playoff series in 1954. The team drew 32,146 (1952), 38,431 (1953), 18,532 (1954) and 8,750 (1955) at Pilots Field. The Statesboro franchise folded during the 1955 season in controversy. The Georgia State League itself then folded after the 1956 season.

On July 19, 1952, at Pilots Field, Joe Louis Reliford of the visiting Fitzgerald Pioneers, age 12, became the youngest person to play in a professional baseball game. Reliford simultaneously broke the racial barrier for the segregated Georgia State League. A photo of Reliford in uniform is housed in the Baseball Hall of Fame Library in Cooperstown, N.Y. During the game, Reliford, playing outfield for one inning, made a catch over the wall, robbing Pilot player Jim Shuster of a home run to end the game. He was congratulated by Pilot fans, who came on the field and cheered him.

In 1955, the Statesboro Pilots folded during the season, which proved to be their final season of minor league play. According to reports, an alleged incident during an away game against the Hazlehurst-Baxley Cardinals on June 26, 1955, led to Statesboro leaving the league. After incidents of spiking reportedly occurred during the game, Hazelhurst ownership allegedly visited the Statesboro clubhouse after the game and a ruckus ensued. As a result, Statesboro demanded police protection before they would play Hazlehurst again. The Georgia State League ruled that the Pilots must play or leave the league. Pilots President McAllister then withdrew the team from the Georgia State League on July 1, 1955.

Statesboro has not hosted another minor league team.

== The ballpark ==
The Statesboro Pilots played minor league home games at Pilots Field. The Statesboro Athletic Association built the ballpark in 1947 for the Pilots at a cost of $30,000, with a seating capacity of 1,500. The use of the "Pilots" moniker for the ballpark was selected due to the ballpark being close to the local airport at the time. Regarding Pilots Field today, according to the Statesboro Herald: "the field, which had wooden stands and wooden box seats, was on the road that runs by the old Georgia State Patrol headquarters, now the Department of Driver Services office, from U.S. Highway 301 North toward Brodie International. The location is still visible as the first clearing on the right past the Driver Services parking lot." The Driver Services facility is located at 19051 US Highway 301 South, Statesboro, Georgia.

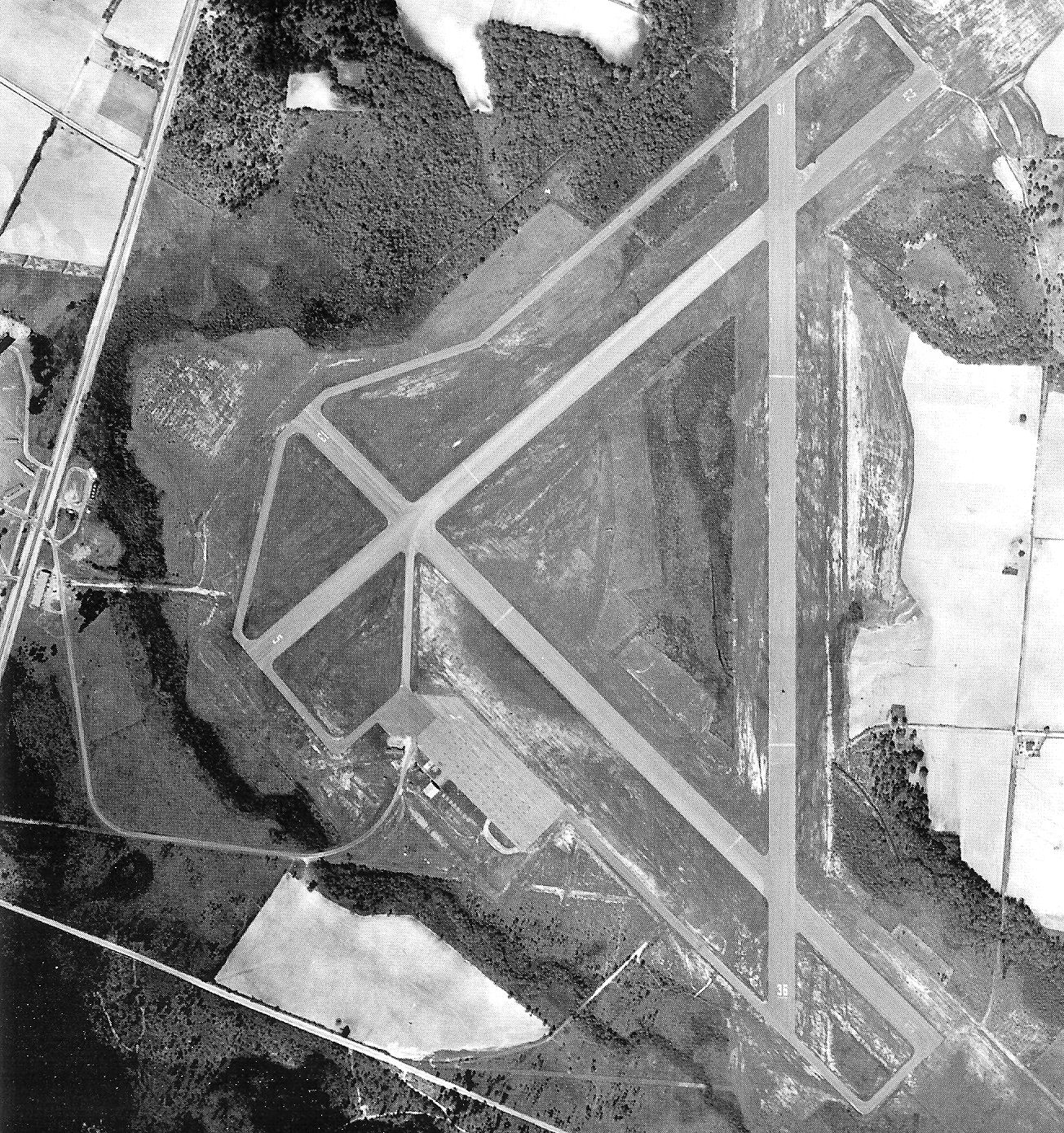
(1943) Statesboro Army Airfield.

== Timeline ==
Year(s)	# Yrs.	Team	Level	League	Ballpark
1952–1955	4	Statesboro Pilots	Class D	Georgia State League	Pilots Field

== Year–by–year records ==
Year	Record	Finish	Manager	Playoffs/Notes
1952	59–65	5th	Charles Quimby	Did not qualify
1953	49–77	5th	Red Thrasher / Jack Hines	Did not qualify
1954	57–73	4th	Jack Hines	Lost in 1st round
1955	25–40	NA	James Sosebee / Gerald Peters	Team folded July 1

== Notable alumni ==
- Gene Smith (1953)
- Bobby Walston (1953) Philadelphia Eagles Hall of Fame
- Statesboro Pilots players
