= Pete Pavlick =

Peter Pavlick, Jr. (January 16, 1926 in Bayonne, New Jersey, USA – September 5, 1990) was a minor league baseball manager who is notable for leading the Georgia State League's Sandersville Giants to a co-league championship in 1955. He also played in the minor league for 15 seasons.

Pavlick managed in the New York Giants system from 1955 and 1957, where he managed the Sandersville Giants (1955–1956) and the St. Cloud Rox (1957), and in the New York Mets system from 1965 to 1969, where he managed the Marion Mets (1965), Greenville Mets (1966), Winter Haven Mets (1967), Raleigh-Durham Mets (1968) and Memphis Blues (1969). As mentioned he led the Sandersville Giants to a co-league championship in 1955. In 1956, he led them to the league finals, which they lost. In 1968 he led the Raleigh-Durham Mets to the league finals, which they lost. In 1969, he instituted a plan of using one pitcher per inning each game. He was replaced partway through the year.

Pavlick managed multiple notable players while a manager, including Hall of Famers Willie McCovey and Nolan Ryan and All-Stars Jim Bibby, Jerry Morales and Ken Singleton.

Pavlick played from 1943 to 1944 and from 1946 to 1958. A second baseman, he hit .277 with 1,384 hits in 1,395 games. In 1950, he led the International League in stolen bases. Though he never played in the major leagues, he did attend major league spring training with the Giants.

He also served as the head coach of Biscayne College.
