= Memorial Stadium (Waycross) =

Stadium in Waycross, Georgia

- "The Swamp"
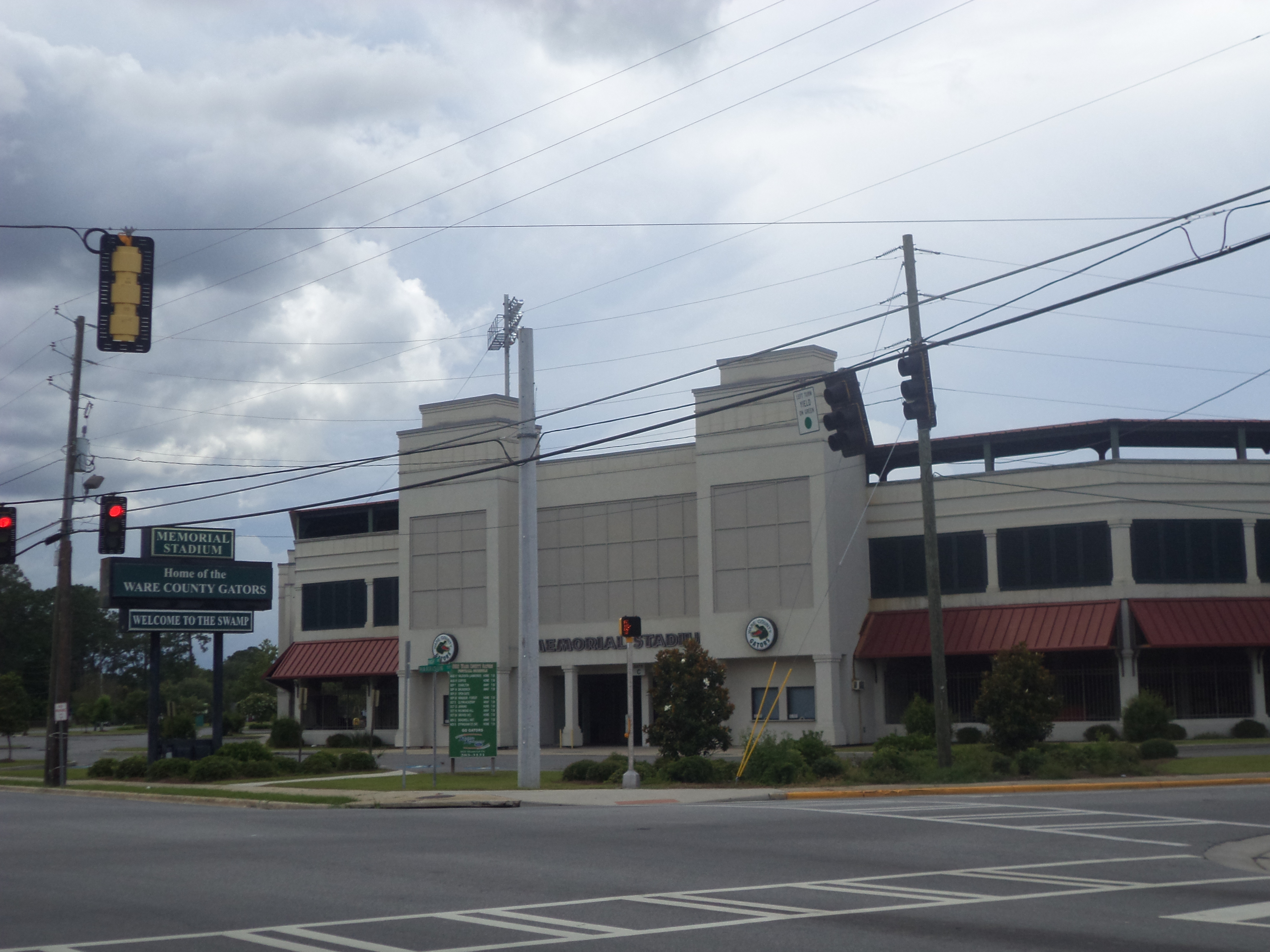
- Memorial Stadium, July 2013
- Interactive map of Memorial Stadium
- Location: Waycross, Georgia
- Owner: Ware County, Georgia
- Capacity: 12,000
- Surface: Natural Grass

Construction
- Opened: 1949
- Cost: $300,000

Tenants
- Ware County High School (GHSA) (1958–present); Waycross High School (GHSA) (1949–1993); Waycross Bears (Georgia–Florida League) (1950–1955); Waycross Braves (Georgia–Florida League) (1956–1958, 1963)

Memorial Stadium is a 12,000-capacity county-owned stadium located in Waycross, Georgia, the largest city in and county seat of Ware County in the southern part of the state.

Noted for its J-shaped main stand, Memorial Stadium was originally intended as a multi-use venue that would be home to both baseball and football in Ware County. During the 1950s and 1960s the stadium played host to a duo of Georgia–Florida League teams, the Bears and the Braves in addition to hosting high school football in the autumn.

In 2002, the stadium was renovated and became a venue exclusively for sports played on rectangular fields (chiefly football, though soccer is also played at the venue occasionally) with the addition of a new stand running along the northern sideline.
