= Joe Reliford =

American policeman, youngest ever professional baseball player (1939–2022)

- Batboy / Outfielder
- Born: November 29, 1939; Fitzgerald, Georgia, U.S.
- Died: May 2, 2022 (aged 82); Douglas, Georgia, U.S.
- Batted: Right Threw: Right

Teams
- Fitzgerald Pioneers (1952); Fitzgerald Lucky Stars (1952)

Joe Louis Reliford (November 29, 1939 – May 2, 2022) was an American Minor League Baseball batboy who became the youngest person to participate in a professional baseball game on July 19, 1952. He was inserted into a game for the Fitzgerald Pioneers of the Georgia State League at the age of 12 years and 234 days.

When the Pioneers fell behind the Statesboro Pilots 13–0, heading into the eighth inning, the crowd started chanting for club manager Charley Ridgeway to "put in the batboy." He was sent to the plate against pitcher Curtis White and grounded out to third base. He then continued to play in the game as the center fielder. Reliford was released shortly after the game, Ridgeway was suspended for five days and fined $50 (equivalent to $606 in 2025), which local fans paid for him, and umpire Ed Kubrick was fired by the league. Reliford became the youngest person to play in professional baseball. As he was African American, he broke the color barrier in the Georgia State League as well.

Later that summer, Reliford went to work for the semi-pro Fitzgerald Lucky Stars, even appearing in a few games. Any chance Reliford had at an athletic career, however, was cut short by a broken collarbone suffered in college. After graduation, Reliford went on to become an electrical technician and moved to Douglas, Georgia, where he became only the third African American hired to that city's police force. He was later appointed deputy sheriff, a post he held until retiring in 1998, and appointed a deacon of Pleasant Grove Baptist Church. He also served as a Douglas city commissioner.

Reliford died on May 2, 2022, at the age of 82.
