= Cedartown Cedars =

- 1920–1921; Cedartown, Georgia

Minor league affiliations
- Class: Class D (1920–1921)
- League: Georgia State League (1920–1921)

Major league affiliations
- Team: None

Minor league titles
- League titles (0): None

Team data
- Name: Cedartown Cedars (1920–1921)
- Ballpark: Peek Park*

The Cedartown Cedars were a minor league baseball team based in Cedartown, Georgia. The Cedars played the 1921 and 1922 seasons as members of the Class D level Georgia State League, before the league folded. Ollie Tucker won the league Triple Crown playing for Cedartown in 1921.

== History ==
The 1920 Cedartown Cedars began minor league play as members of the six–team, Class D level Georgia State League. The Carrollton, Griffin, LaGrange, Lindale Pepperells and Rome teams joined Cedartown in beginning league play on May 20, 1920.

The Cedars ended their first season of play in fourth place. Cedartown finished the 1920 season with a record of 44–48. Playing the season under manager D.V. Jones, the Cedars finished 9.0 games behind the first place and champion Carrollton team in the final standings. The league held no playoffs in 1920. Cedartown's Ike Boone led the league with a .407 average and 10 home runs. Boone also led the league with 63 runs scored and 117 total hits. Future New York Yankees player Camp Skinner played for Cedartown in 1920.

The Cedartown Cedars continued play in the 1921 six–team Georgia State League and won the league pennant. The Cedars finished with a record of 51–49, placing fifth in the 1921 standings. Playing under returning manager Hardin Herndon, Cedartown finished 18.0 games behind of the first place Lindale Pepperells in the regular season standings. In the league playoff, the LaGrange defeated Lindale.

Cedartown player Ollie Tucker won the Triple Crown in the Georgia State League, batting .434 with 22 home runs and 146 RBI. Tucker also led the league with 76 runs scored.

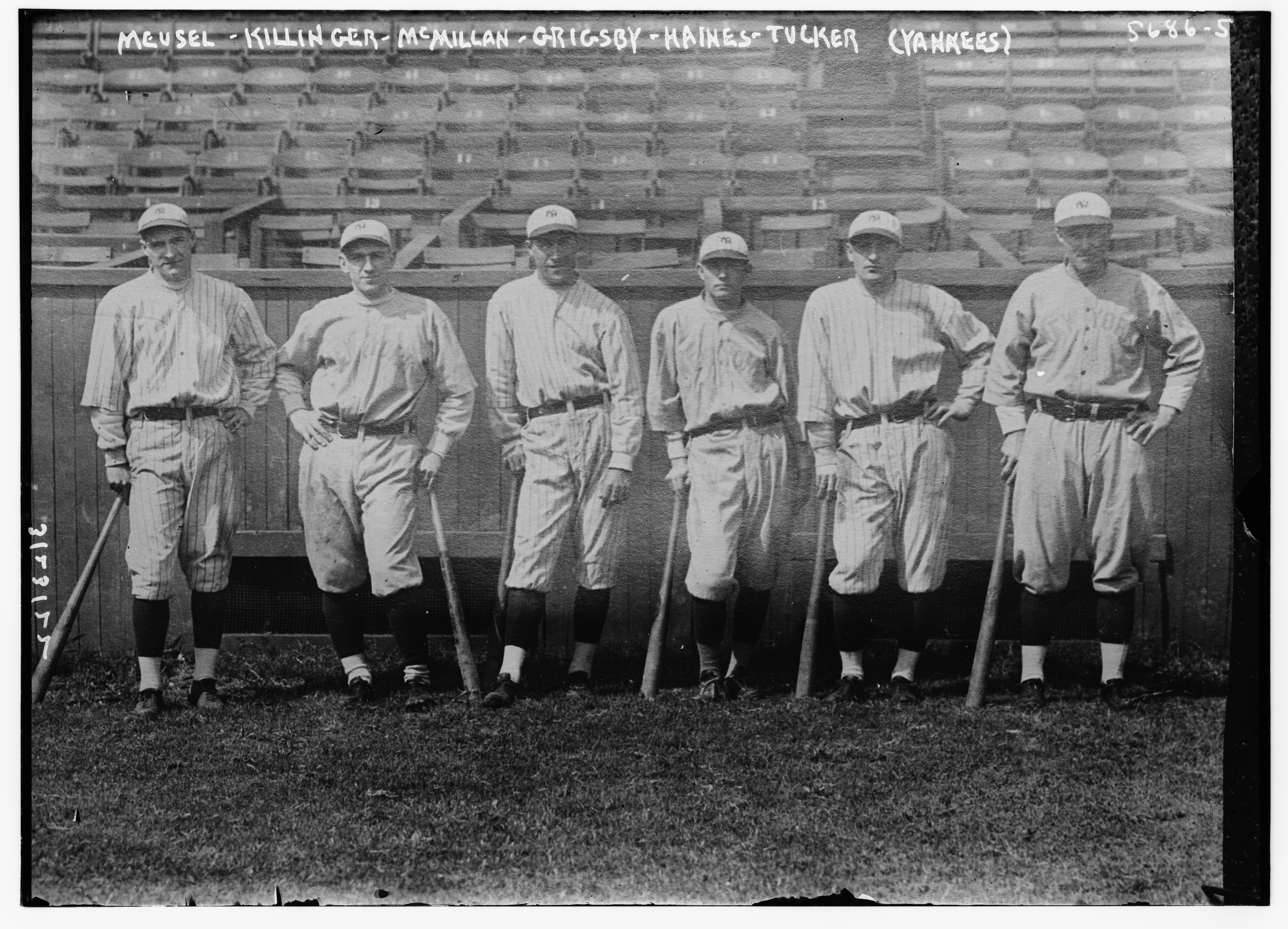
(1922) Bob Meusel, Glenn Killinger, Norm McMillan, Denver Grigsby, Hinkey Haines, Ollie Tucker. 1922 New York Yankees. Tucker won the Triple Crown in the 1921 Georgia State League playing for Cedartown.

The Georgia State League folded after the season and did not return to play in 1923. Cedartown next hosted minor league baseball when the 1928 Cedartown Sea Cows began play as members of the Class D level Georgia-Alabama League.

== The ballpark ==
The name of the Cedartown Cedars' minor league home ballpark is not directly referenced. Peek Park was in use as a public park in the era. Peek Park was built on land donated by Captain J.A. Peek. Still in use today as a public park, Peek Park is located on North College Street.

== Timeline ==
| Year(s) | # Yrs. | Team | Level | League |
|---|---|---|---|---|
| 1920–1921 | 2 | Cedartown Cedars | Class D | Georgia State League |

== Year–by–year records ==
| Year | Record | Finish | Manager | Playoffs/Notes |
|---|---|---|---|---|
| 1920 | 44–48 | 4th | D.V. Jones | No playoffs held |
| 1921 | 52–49 | 3rd | William Schwartz | Did not qualify |

== Notable alumni ==
- Ike Boone (1920)
- Camp Skinner (1920)
- Ollie Tucker (1921)

== See also ==
- Cedartown Cedars players
