= Thomson Orioles =

- 1956; Thomson, Georgia

Minor league affiliations
- Class: Class D (1956)
- League: Georgia State League (1956)

Major league affiliations
- Team: Baltimore Orioles (1956)

Minor league titles
- League titles (0): None
- Wild card berths (1): 1956

Team data
- Name: Thomson Orioles (1956)
- Ballpark: The Brickyard (1956)

The Thomson Orioles were a minor league baseball team based in Thomson, Georgia. In 1956, the "Orioles" played as members of the Class D level Georgia State League in the last season of play for the league. The Orioles qualified for the league playoffs. Thomson hosted home minor league games at The Brickyard. The Thomson Orioles were so nicknamed, as the team was a minor league affiliate of the Baltimore Orioles.

== History ==
In 1920, Thomson, Georgia fielded a team in the semi–professional North Georgia League. Thomson was in 1st place in the league with a 20–5 record in standings posted on July 15, 1920. Thomson won the first half pennant in the league and played Elberton, winners of the second half pennant, in the finals.

In 1956, Thomson first hosted minor league baseball in 1956, when the Thomson "Orioles" began play as members of the six–team the Class D level Georgia State League in the league's final season of play. The new Thompson franchise replaced the Statesboro Pilots franchise in league play.

The Thomson Orioles placed fourth in the 1956 Georgia State League final standings and qualified for the playoffs. Thomson ended the Georgia State League regular season with a 61–59 record, playing under managers Enid Drake and Barney Lutz. Thomson finished16.0 games behind the first place Douglas Reds in the final standings. In the 1956 playoffs, the Sandersville Giants defeated Thomson 3 games to 2 in their first–round series. The Georgia State League permanently folded after completing the 1956 season.

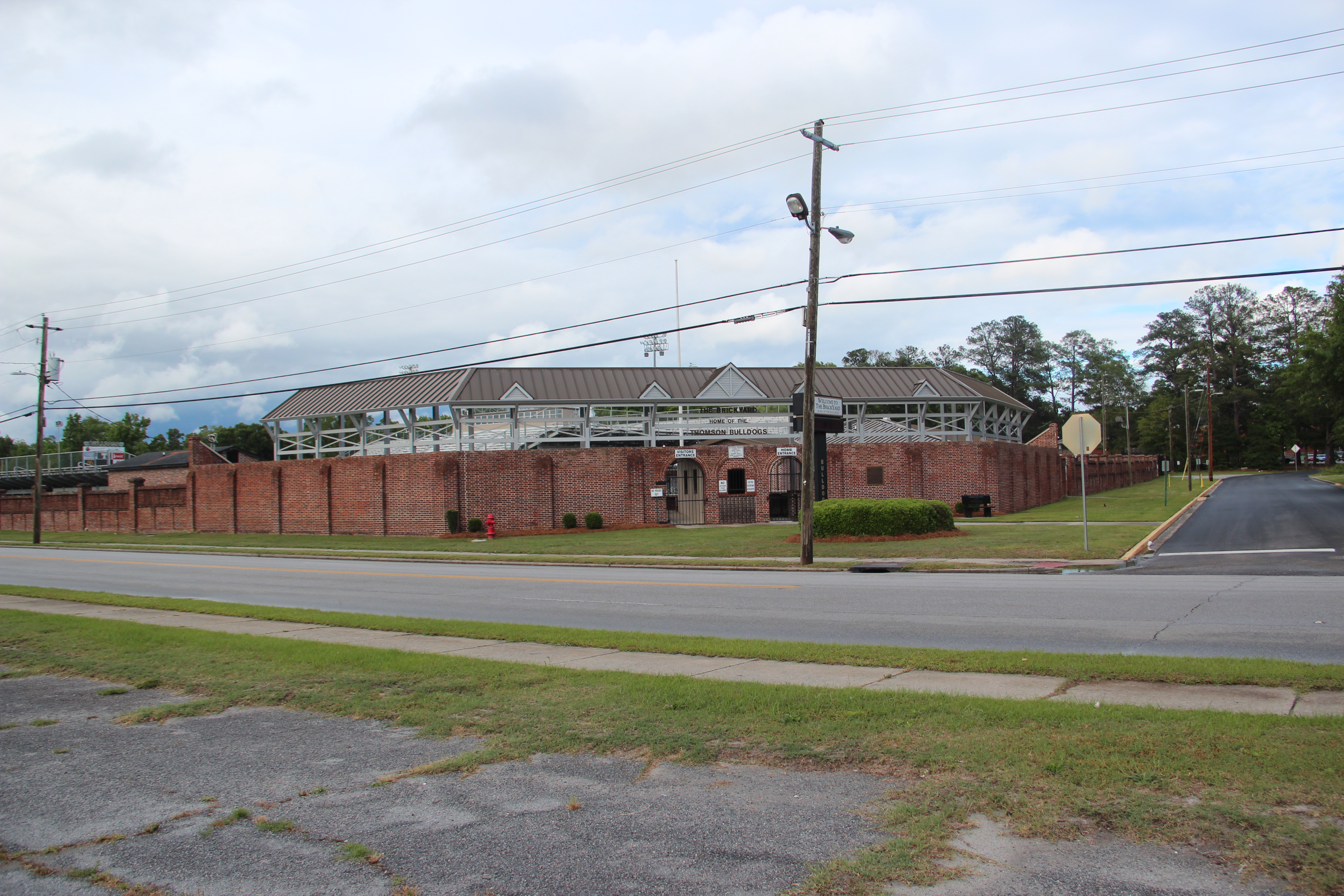
(2017) The Brickyard, Thomson, Georgia

Attendance issues were a contributing factor in the Georgia State League folding following the 1956 season. The Thomson Orioles season home attendance at The Brickyard was 40,849, an average of 681 per game, leading the Georgia State League in attendance. Thomson drew 8,000 more fans than the second ranked team in home attendance.

Thomson, Georgia has not hosted another minor league team.

== The ballpark ==
The Thomson Orioles team hosted minor league home games at The Brickyard. The facility was built utilizing brick that was salvaged from the Thomson High School facility, which was struck by lightning in 1937 and subsequently destroyed. Today, the facility is still in use as home to Thomson High School athletic teams. The original baseball grandstands have been removed. The Brickyard stadium is located at 612 Main Street in Thomson, Georgia.

== Year–by–year record ==
Year	Record	Finish	Manager	Playoffs/Notes
1956	61–59	4th	Enid Drake / Barney Lutz	Lost in 1st round

== Notable alumni ==
- Lloyd Brown (1956)
- Fred Hofmann (1956)
- Roger Marquis (1956)

== See also ==
- Thomson Orioles players
