= Dave Coble =

American baseball player (1912-1971)

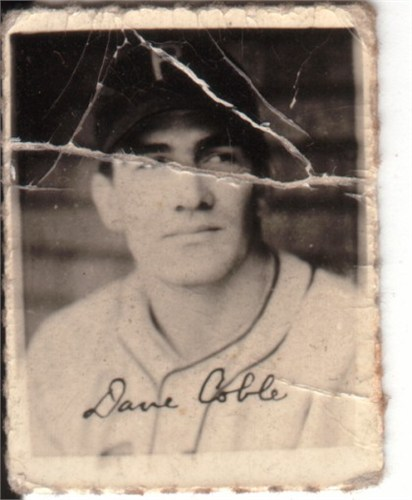
- Catcher
- Born: December 24, 1912; Monroe, North Carolina, U.S.
- Died: October 16, 1971 (aged 58); Orlando, Florida, U.S.
- Batted: Right Threw: Right

MLB debut
- May 1, 1939, for the Philadelphia Phillies

Last MLB appearance
- August 6, 1939, for the Philadelphia Phillies

MLB statistics
- Games played: 15
- Batting average: .280
- Stats at Baseball Reference

Teams
- Philadelphia Phillies (1939)

David Lamar Coble (December 24, 1912 – October 16, 1971) was an American professional baseball player and manager. A catcher, Coble played one season in Major League Baseball (MLB), appearing in 15 games with the 1939 Philadelphia Phillies. Listed at 6 feet 1 inch (1.85 m) and 183 pounds (83 kg), he batted and threw right-handed.

== Biography ==
Coble was born in 1912 in Monroe, North Carolina, the son of John Bunyan and Caroline Virginia née Rudge Coble. He began his professional baseball career in 1936, playing 91 games for the Class D Moultrie Packers and 17 games for the Class B Columbia Senators. Coble then spent 1937 and 1938 with the Class A1 Little Rock Travelers, appearing in 153 total games during those two seasons.

Coble's only major league appearances came in 1939, when he appeared in 15 games for the Philadelphia Phillies between May 1 and August 6. He had seven hits in 25 at bats for the Phillies, for a .280 batting average. Defensively, he had a .982 fielding percentage. Coble also played in 12 games for the Double-A Baltimore Orioles during 1939.

Coble spent 1940 and 1941 with the Class B Rocky Mount Red Sox and Class C Greenville Buckshots, respectively. He did not play during the war years of 1942–1945, serving with the United States Army. Coble's final appearances as a player came during 1946, when he played in 25 games for the Class B Gadsden Pilots. During his seven seasons as a player, Coble appeared in 510 minor league games, accruing a .236 batting average.

Coble was a player-manager during 1941 and 1946, and served as manager for several minor league teams from 1947 through 1952, mainly at the Class D level. His longest tenure was with the Shelby Farmers of the Western Carolina League, managing the team from 1951 to 1953, winning two league championships in the three seasons.

After his baseball career, Coble worked as a real estate salesman. He died in 1971 in Orlando, Florida, and was survived by two sisters and two brothers.
