= Tifton Phillies =

- 1949–1956; Tifton, Georgia

Minor league affiliations
- Previous classes: Class D
- League: Georgia–Florida League (1951–1956)
- Previous leagues: Georgia State League (1949–1950)

Major league affiliations
- Previous teams: Philadelphia Phillies (1956); Cleveland Indians (1954)

Minor league titles
- Division titles: 1 (1949)

Team data
- Previous names: Tifton Phillies (1956); Tifton Blue Sox (1955); Tifton Indians (1954); Tifton Blue Sox (1949–1953)

The Tifton Phillies were a Georgia–Florida League baseball team based in Tifton, Georgia, USA that played during the 1956 season. They were affiliated with the Philadelphia Phillies. They were managed by Wes Griffin and later Edward Miller.

However the team was first established in 1949 as the Tifton Blue Sox and was a member of the Georgia State League. The team moved to the Georgia–Florida League in 1951. In 1954, the team was known as the Tifton Indians, after their major league affiliate, the Cleveland Indians.
