= Wes Griffin =

American baseball player, manager (1894–1956)

Wesley H. Griffin
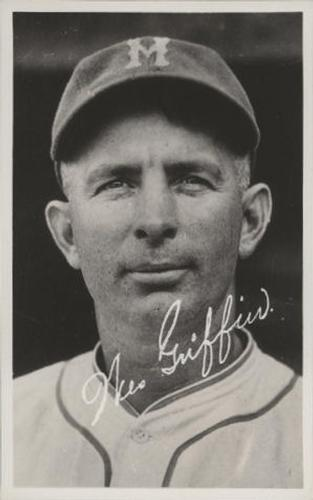
- spitball pitcher, outfielder/second baseman, manager
- Born: June 30, 1894; Helena, Missouri
- Died: July 26, 1956 (aged 62); Tifton, Georgia

Westel or Wesley H. Griffin (June 30, 1894, in Helena, Missouri – July 26, 1956, in Tifton, Georgia) was both a longtime minor league baseball player and manager.

== Playing career ==
Griffin played 22 seasons from 1914 to 1917 and from 1919 to 1936. He played until he was 42 years old. Over the course of his career, he hit .290 with 1,710 hits, 369 doubles, 55 triples and 118 home runs in 1,945 games. He hit as many as 22 home runs and 41 doubles in a season. He also went 41-40 in seven years as a pitcher.

== Managing career ==
Griffin first managed the St. Joseph Saints in 1934, but was replaced by Earle Brucker partway through the season. In 1935 and 1936, he managed the Winnipeg Maroons, winning the league championship in 1935. He managed the Indianapolis Indians from 1939 to 1940, being replaced by Jewel Ens in the latter season. After losing his job with the Indians, he replaced Chester Bujaci of the Fargo-Moorhead Twins, which he managed until being replaced by Mike Blazo in 1941. He headed the Uniontown Coal Barons in 1949 and the Hutchinson Elks from 1950 to 1953, leading them to league championships in his first and last years with the team. The final team he managed was the Tifton Phillies in 1956. Following his mid-season death, he was replaced by Edward Miller.
