= Greenville Mets =

The Greenville Mets was the name of an American minor league baseball franchise representing Greenville, South Carolina, that played for the 1965 and 1966 seasons in the Class A Western Carolinas League. It played its home games at Meadowbrook Park and produced future Baseball Hall of Fame pitcher and strikeout king Nolan Ryan as well as another hurler, Jerry Koosman, who would go on to star on the New York Mets' 1969 "Miracle Mets" team.

Greenville was represented in the WCL from 1963 to 1972, taking its nicknames from its various parent organizations. The Mets succeeded the Milwaukee Braves as the Major League Baseball parents of the Greenville franchise after the 1964 campaign. Koosman played on the 1965 club, posting a lacklustre 5–11 won/lost record and an earned run average of 4.71. But Ryan dominated the 1966 Western Carolinas League. He won 17 games, lost only two, and struck out 272 batters in 183 innings pitched. The Greenville Mets also produced future MLB players Duffy Dyer, Ed Figueroa and Dick Selma, among others.

The Mets moved to the Florida State League in 1967 and the Boston Red Sox became parents of the Greenville WCL club.

Year	Record	Finish	Attendance	Manager
1965	44–80	Eighth	30,250	Ken Deal
1966	86–40	Second	59,078	Pete Pavlick
