= Eastman Dodgers =

- 1948–1953; Eastman, Georgia

Minor league affiliations
- Previous classes: Class D
- League: Georgia State League

Major league affiliations
- Previous teams: Unaffiliated

Minor league titles
- League titles: 1950
- Conference titles: 1949, 1952

Team data
- Previous parks: Legion Park

The Eastman Dodgers were a minor league baseball team based in Eastman, Georgia. The Eastman Dodgers were members of the Class D Georgia State League from 1948 to 1953 winning the 1950 league pennant and 1949 and 1952 league pennants. The Dodgers hosted home minor league games at Legion Park.

== History ==
The 1949 Eastman Dodgers captured the Georgia State League pennant, finishing first in the regular season with a 86–51 record. Eastman was defeated 3 games to 2 by the Vidalia-Lyons Twins in the 1949 playoffs.

In 1950, the Eastman Dodgers captured the Georgia State League Championship. Eastman finished the regular season with a 79–61 record, 3rd in the Georgia State League, under Manager Edd Hartness. The 1950 Georgia State League Playoffs, the Eastman Dodgers defeated the Douglas Trojans 3 games to 1 to advance. In the Finals, Eastman defeated the Dublin Green Sox 4 games to 3 to capture the championship.

The Eastman Dodgers captured the 1952 Georgia State League pennant. Eastman finished 75-49 during the regular season, 1st in the Georgia State League. The Eastman Dodgers were defeated 4 games to 2 in the playoffs by the Douglas Trojans.

In 1953, the Eastman Dodgers advanced to the Finals after finishing 3rd in the regular season. After sweeping the Jesup Bees in four gamed in the first round, Eastman was defeated in the 1953 Georgia State League Finals by the Hazlehurst-Baxley Cardinals 4 games to 3.

== The ballpark ==
The Eastman Dodgers played at Legion Park In Eastman, Georgia.
