= Vidalia Indians =

- 1948–1956; (1948–1950, 1952–1956); Vidalia, Georgia

Minor league affiliations
- Class: Class D (1948–1950, 1952–1956)
- League: Georgia State League (1948–1950, 1952–1956)

Major league affiliations
- Team: Cleveland Indians (1952–1956)

Minor league titles
- League titles (2): 1952; 1954
- Conference titles (1): 1954
- Wild card berths (2): 1955; 1956

Team data
- Name: Vidalia-Lyons Twins (1948–1950); Vidalia Indians (1952–1956)
- Ballpark: Vidalia Municipal Stadium (1948-1950, 1952–1956)

The Vidalia Indians were a minor league baseball team based in Vidalia, Georgia. With the exception of 1951, Vidalia teams between 1948 and 1956 played exclusively as members of the Class D level Georgia State League, winning Georgia State League championships in 1952 and 1954. From 1948 to 1950, Vidalia played as the "Vidalia-Lyons Twins," in partnership with neighboring Lyons, Georgia. The "Indians" nickname was adopted as Vidalia served as a minor league affiliate of the Cleveland Indians from 1952 to 1956. Vidalia hosted home games in all minor league seasons at Vidalia Municipal Stadium.

== History ==
Minor league baseball in Vidalia, began in 1948 when the Vidalia–Lyons Twins were formed, in partnership with neighboring Lyons, Georgia. The Twins played in the newly reformed six–team Class D level Georgia State League from 1948 to 1950. The team was named the "Twins" because of the close proximity and partnership of Vidalia and Lyons.

The Twins finished the 1948 regular season with a 54–66 record, placing fifth. The 1949 Twins finished in fourth place with a 72–65 record and advanced to the Georgia State League Finals in the playoffs. In 1950, the Twins had a 56–83 record, placing seventh in the final standings.

After not fielding a team in 1951, the Vidalia Indians rejoined the 1952 Class D Georgia State League as an affiliate of the Cleveland Indians. Today, the local Vidalia High School sports teams are known as the "Indians."

The Vidalia Indians captured the 1952 Georgia State League championship. Vidalia finished the regular season with a record of 66–58, placing third in the 1952 regular season. Playing under manager Frank "Bull" Hamons, Vidalia finished 9.0 games behind the first place Eastman Dodgers. After beating the Hazlehurst-Baxley Cardinals four games to two, the Vidalia Indians defeated the Douglas Trojans four games to two in the league finals to win the championship. The 1952 season attendance for Vidalia was 37,485, an average of 605 per home game.

In the 1953 season, the Indians finished last in the Georgia State League. Placing eighth in the eight–the team league, the Indians had a 41–82 record under managers Frank Hamons, Jake Daniel and Don Cross. The Indians finished 42.0 games behind first place Baxley-Hazlehurst Red Sox in the regular season standings.

The Vidalia Indians rebounded from the last place finish and won the 1954 Georgia State League championship and pennant. The Indians ended the regular season in first place, with a 85–44 record under manager James Beavers, finishing just 0.5 game ahead of the second place Douglas Trojans. In the 1954 playoffs, after defeating the Statesboro Pilots four games to two, Vidalia swept the Douglas Trojans four games to none in the league finals. During their championship season of 1954, the Indians had home season attendance of 53,334 at Vidalia Municipal Stadium.

Vidalia qualified for the 1955 Georgia State League playoffs with a fourth-place regular season finish. Playing the season under player/manager Ed Levy, the Indians ended the regular season with a 56–54 record, in fourth place, finishing 7.0 games behind the first place Douglas Trojans. In the playoffs, the Indians lost in the first round of the playoffs, as the Douglas Trojans defeated the Vidalia three games to one. Vidalia was led by pitcher Gary Bell, who finished the season with a 7–5 record and a 3.33 ERA.

In their final season, the 1956 Vidalia Indians placed third in the 1956 Georgia State League regular season standings and again qualified for the playoffs. Playing under manager Mark Wylie, the Indians ended the regular season with a 63–57 record, finishing 14.0 games behind the Douglas Reds. In the first round of the playoffs, the Douglas Reds beat the Vidalia Indians three games to two, in the last games played by the franchise. Dick Stigman had a record of 17–9 with a 1.44 ERA. Vidalia had 1956 season attendance of 17,273, an average of 288 per game.

The Georgia State League permanently folded after completing the 1956 season. Vidalia, Georgia has not hosted another minor league baseball team.

== The ballpark ==
The Vidalia Indians and Vidalia–Lyons Twins played minor league home games at Vidalia Municipal Stadium.

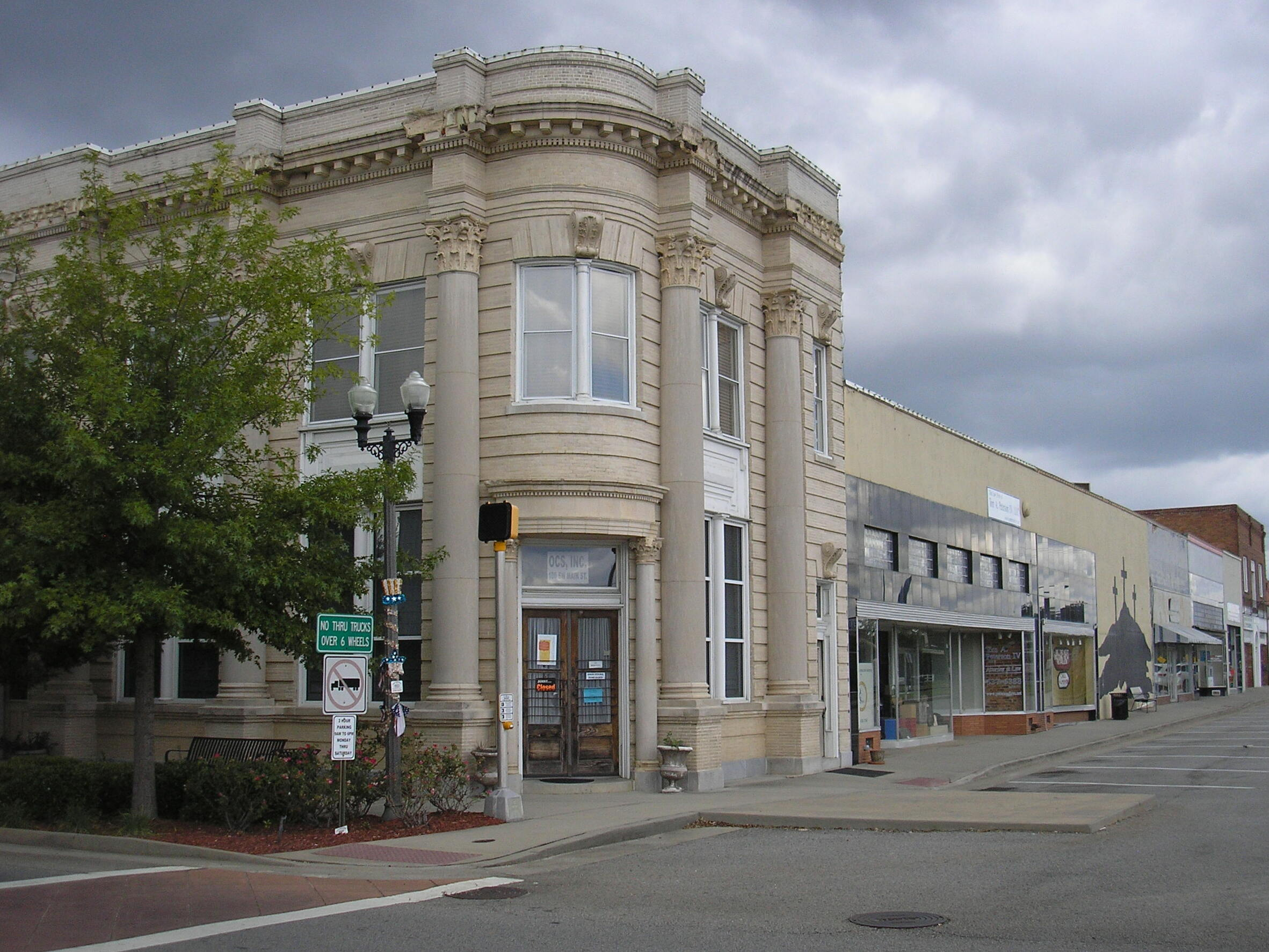
(2015) Downtown Historic District. National Register of Historic Places. Vidalia, Georgia.

== Timeline ==
Year(s)	# Yrs.	Team	Level	League	Affiliate	Ballpark
1948–1950	3	Vidalia–Lyons Twins	Class D	Georgia State League	None	Vidalia Municipal Stadium
1952–1956	5	Vidalia Indians	Class D	Georgia State League	Cleveland Indians	Vidalia Municipal Stadium

== Year–by–year records ==
Year	Record	Finish	Manager	Playoffs
1948	54–66	5th	Sugar Cain / Truman Connell	Did not qualify
1949	72–65	4th	Michael Rossi / Julian Morgan / Joe Santomauro	Lost League Finals
1950	56–83	7th	Mike Kreshka / James Smith	Did not qualify
1952	66–58	3rd	Bull Hamons	League Champs
1953	41–82	8th	Bull Hamons / Jake Daniel / Don Cross	Did not qualify
1954	85–44	1st	James Beavers	League Champs
1955	56–54	4th	Ed Levy	Lost in 1st round
1956	63–57	3rd	Mark Wylie	Lost in 1st round

== Notable alumni ==
- Gary Bell (1955) 4x MLB All-Star
- Sugar Cain (1948, MGR)
- Jake Daniel (1952; 1953, MGR)
- Don Dillard (1955)
- Joe Shipley (1953)
- Dick Stigman (1956) 2x MLB All-Star

== See also ==
- Vidalia Indians players
