= Cordele Reds =

- 1906–1955; (1906, 1913–1914, 1936–1942, 1946–1955); Cordele, Georgia

Minor league affiliations
- Previous classes: Class D
- League: Georgia–Florida League (1914, 1936–1955)
- Previous leagues: Empire State League (1913); Georgia State League (1906)

Major league affiliations
- Previous teams: Baltimore Orioles (1954–1955); Philadelphia Athletics (1950–1953); Cleveland Indians (1947–1949); Chicago White Sox (1946); Cincinnati Reds (1941–1942); No Affiliate (1938–1940); Cincinnati Reds (1936–1937)

Minor league titles
- League titles: 1 (1937)

Team data
- Previous names: Cordele Orioles (1955); Americus-Cordele Orioles (1954); Cordele Athletics (1950–1953); Cordele Indians (1947–1949); Cordele White Sox (1946); Cordele Reds (1941–1942); Cordele Bees (1939–1942); Cordele Reds (1936–1938); Cordele Ramblers (1914); Cordele Babies (1913); Cordele (1906)
- Previous parks: Standard Field

The Cordele Reds were a minor league baseball team based in Cordele, Georgia in various seasons from 1906-1955.

== History ==
Cordele played in the Class-D Georgia–Florida League from 1936–1942 and 1946–1955. The city was originally represented by a team in the Georgia State League in 1906, with a team simply noted as Cordele. In 1913, the city was represented in the Empire State League with the Cordele Babies. The following season, the team moved into the Georgia–Florida League, as the Cordele Ramblers. After 22-year hiatus, a team reemerged in the Georgia–Florida League was the Reds, as an affiliate of the Cincinnati Reds in 1937. The team became briefly known as the Cordele Bees from 1939–1940. They had affiliation an agreement with the Atlanta Crackers in 1938.

After World War II, the team became known as the Cordele White Sox, as they were an affiliate of the Chicago White Sox. The following season, the team became the Cordele Indians playing as an affiliate of the Cleveland Indians. In 1950, the team's name changed once again to the Cordele Athletics, as they became an affiliate of the Philadelphia Athletics. In 1954, the team merge with a team from Americus, Georgia to become the Americus-Cordele Orioles, an affiliate of the Baltimore Orioles. Finally, the team underwent a final name-change in 1955, as the Cordele Orioles, before folding.

The 1937 team won the Georgia–Florida League Championship under manager Ivy Griffin.

== The ballpark ==
The Cordele teams played at Standard Field. The field is still in use as a multi-use baseball/softball field, located at 302 N. 2nd Street Cordele, Georgia 31015.

== Notable alumni ==
- Max Carey (1955) Inducted Baseball Hall of Fame, 1961
- Lloyd Brown (1955)
- Dana Fillingim (1913–1914)
- Andy High (1941)
- Jimmy Lavender (1906)
- Frank O'Rourke (1942)
- Bama Rowell (1937)
- Harry Rice (1939)
