= Jesup Bees =

- 1950–1953; Jesup, Georgia

Minor league affiliations
- Class: Class D (1950–1953)
- League: Georgia State League (1950–1953)

Major league affiliations
- Team: None

Minor league titles
- League titles (0): None
- Conference titles (2): 1951; 1953
- Wild card berths (0): None

Team data
- Name: Jesup Bees (1950–1953)
- Ballpark: Milikin Park (1950–1953)

The Jesup Bees were a minor league baseball team based in Jesup, Georgia. From 1950 to 1953, the Bees played exclusively as members of the Class D level Georgia State League, winning league pennants in 1951 and 1953. The Bees hosted home games at Milikin Park and permanently folded following the 1953 season.

== History ==
The 1950 Jesup Bees first began play as an expansion team, joining as members of the eight–team Class D level Georgia State League.

In their first season of minor league play, Jesup ended the season in fifth place. The Bees finished with a record of 69–69 in the 1950 Georgia State League standings, playing under manager Herb Stein. The Jesup Bees did not qualify for the playoffs, finishing 14.0 games behind the first place Dublin Green Sox. The Jesup Bees drew 23,893 for the season, an average of 346 per game.

The 1951 Jesup Bees captured the Georgia State League pennant. The Bees placed first in the six–team regular season standings, ending the regular season with a 86–43 record playing under manager Donald Stoyle, finishing 7.5 games ahead of the second place Dublin Green Sox. In the playoffs, the Douglas Trojans swept the Jesup Bees 4 games to 0. Jesup pitcher Don Rudolph finished with a 28–8 record and a 2.98 ERA, throwing in 285 inning for the Bees. Jesup home season attendance was 23,931.

The 1952 Jesup Bees continued play and finished last in the eight–team Georgia State League. The Jesup Bees finished with a record of 52–73, playing under returning manager Donald Stoyle and player/manager James Warren. The Bees finished 23.5 games behind the first place Eastman Dodgers. Jesup total home attendance was 16,657, an average of 267 per game.

In their final season of play, the Jesup Bees won the 1953 Georgia State League pennant. Jesup finished with a regular season record of 78–46, placing first in the league under manager Bill Steinecke in the eight–team league. Jesup lost in the first round of the playoffs, being swept by the Eastman Dodgers in four games. The Bees drew 20,629 in 1953 total home attendance. After the 1953 season, both the Jesup and Eastman franchises folded, leaving the 1954 Georgia State League with six teams.

Jesup, Georgia has not hosted another minor league franchise.

== The ballpark ==
The Jesup Bees were noted to have played minor league home games at Milikin Park. Milikin Park was located at Sunset Boulevard & Milikin Street in Jesup, Georgia.

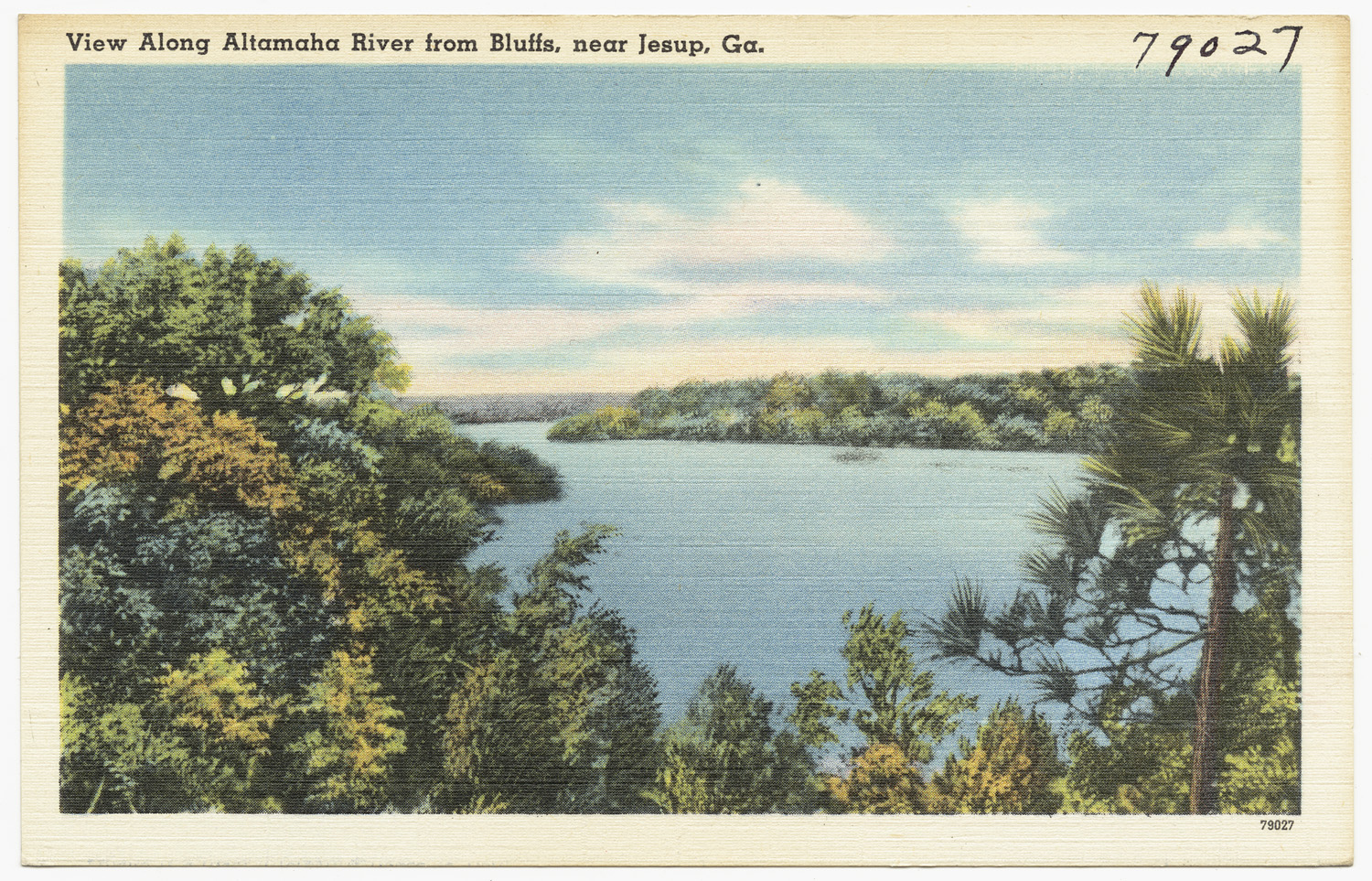
(1945) View along Altamaha River. Jesup, Georgia

== Timeline ==
Year(s)	# Yrs.	Team	Level	League	Ballpark
1950–1953	4	Jesup Bees	Class D	Georgia State League	Milikin Park

== Year–by–year records ==
Year	Record	Finish	Manager	Attend	Playoffs/Notes
1950	69–69	5th	Herb Stein	23,893	Did not qualify
1951	86–43	1st	James Stoyle	23,931	Lost 1st round
1952	52–73	8th	James Stoyle / Jim Warren	16,657	Did not qualify
1953	76–46	1st	Bill Steinecke	20,629	Lost 1st round

== Notable alumni ==
- Don Rudolph (1950–1951)
- Bill Steinecke (1953, MGR)
