= Ollie Tucker =

American baseball player (1902–1940)

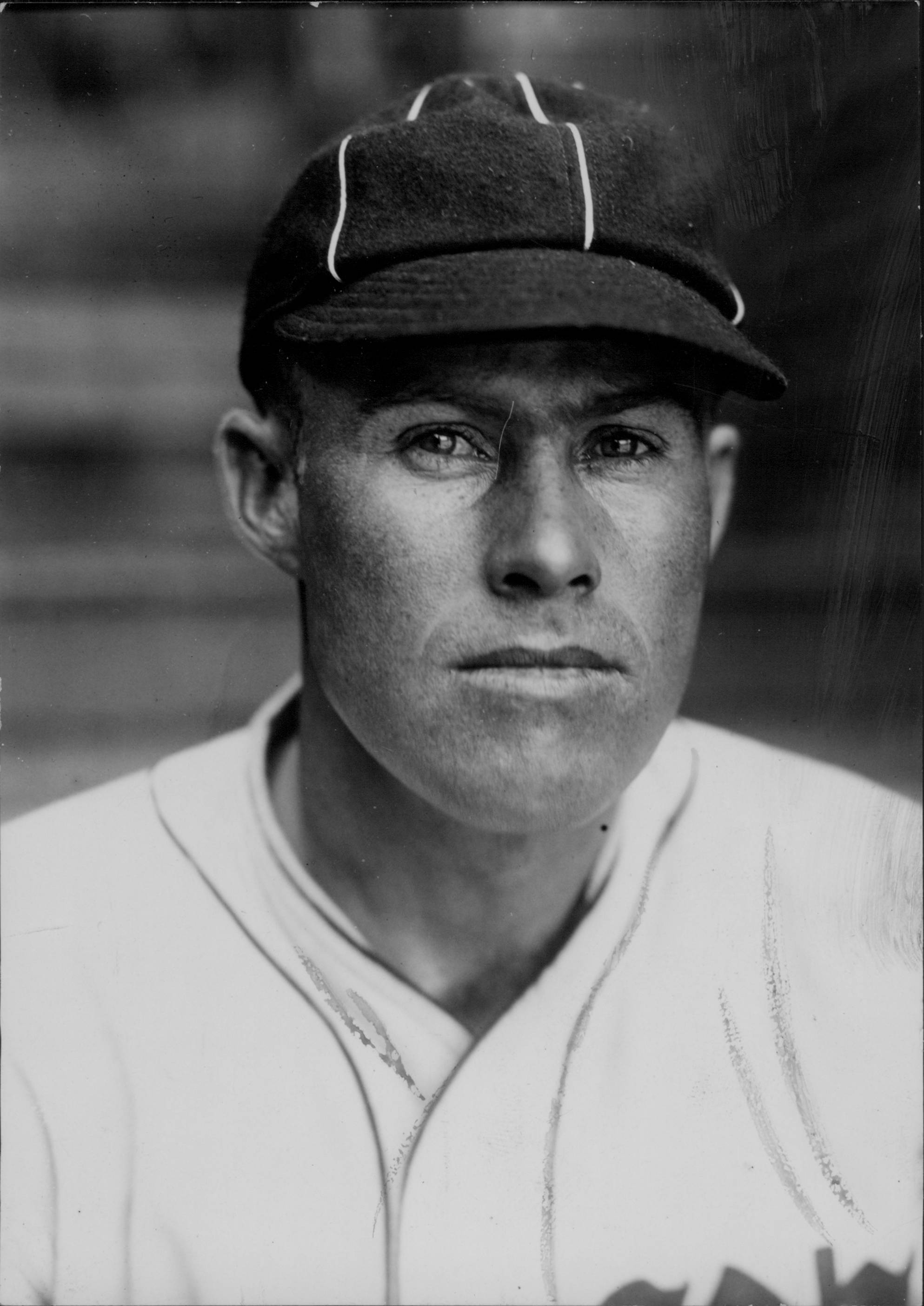
- Tucker in 1927
- Right fielder
- Born: January 27, 1902; Radiant, Virginia, U.S.
- Died: July 13, 1940 (aged 38); Radiant, Virginia, U.S.
- Batted: Left Threw: Right

MLB debut
- April 17, 1927, for the Washington Senators

Last MLB appearance
- September 30, 1928, for the Cleveland Indians

MLB statistics
- Batting average: .155
- Home runs: 1
- Runs batted in: 10
- Stats at Baseball Reference

Teams
- Washington Senators (1927); Cleveland Indians (1928)

Oliver Dinwiddie Tucker (January 27, 1902 – July 13, 1940) was an American Major League Baseball outfielder who played for two seasons. He played for the Washington Senators for 20 games in 1927 and the Cleveland Indians for 14 games in 1928. Ollie Tucker was inducted into the International League Hall of Fame in 2008, one of only 118 total individuals. He had a career playing major and minor league baseball that spanned 14 years, beginning at age 19 with the Cedartown Cedars in 1921 and finishing up with the Buffalo Bisons in 1935. His 6 seasons with the Bisons earned him induction into the Buffalo Baseball Hall of Fame on August 21, 1986. Ollie Tucker died following surgery for removal of a brain tumor.

In 34 games over two major league seasons, Tucker posted a .155 batting average (11-for-71) with 6 runs, 1 home run, 10 RBI and 11 bases on balls. Defensively, he handled 30 total chances (27 putouts, 3 assists) without an error for a 1.000 fielding percentage as a right fielder.
