= Georgia–Florida League =

Defunct minor baseball team

- Most recent season or competition: 1963 Georgia-Florida League season
- Classification: Class A (1963); Class D (1935–1942, 1946–1958, 1962)
- Sport: Baseball
- Founded: 1935; 91 years ago
- Folded: 1963; 63 years ago
- No. of teams: 14
- Country: USA
- Most titles: 8 Albany

The Georgia–Florida League was a minor baseball league that existed from 1935 through 1958 (suspending operations during World War II) and in 1962–1963. It was one of many Class D circuits that played in the Southeastern United States during the postwar period—a group that included the Georgia State League, Georgia–Alabama League, Florida State League, and the Alabama State League.

The GFL's longest-serving clubs represented Moultrie, Thomasville and Albany, all in Georgia. While it managed to survive the downturn in minor league baseball attendance through 1958 and experienced only a handful of in-season franchise shifts (and no in-season team foldings), its member clubs frequently switched affiliations and identities.

In 1963, the minor leagues reorganized and the Georgia–Florida League was designated Class A. But there were only four teams in the '63 GFL, and its champion, the Thomasville Tigers, a Detroit affiliate, attracted only 7,234 fans over the entire course of a home schedule of over 60 games—an average of about 120 fans per game. Attendance woes such as that sealed the league's fate; it folded that autumn and has not since been revived.

== Cities represented ==
- Albany, GA: Albany Travelers 1935–1938; Albany Cardinals 1939–1942, 1946–1958
- Americus, GA: Americus Cardinals 1935–1938; Americus Pioneers 1939–1942; Americus Phillies 1946–1950; Americus Rebels 1951; Americus-Cordele Orioles 1954
- Brunswick, GA: Brunswick Pirates 1951–1956; Brunswick Phillies 1957–1958; Brunswick Cardinals 1962–1963
- Cordele, GA: Cordele Reds 1936–1938; Cordele Bees 1939–1940; Cordele Reds 1941–1942; Cordele White Sox 1946; Cordele Indians 1947–1949; Cordele A's 1950–1953; Cordele Orioles 1955
- Dothan, AL: Dothan Browns 1942
- Dublin, GA: Dublin Orioles 1958; Dublin Braves 1962
- Fitzgerald, GA: Fitzgerald Pioneers 1953; Fitzgerald Redlegs 1954; Fitzgerald A's 1956; Fitzgerald Orioles 1957
- Moultrie, GA: Moultrie Steers 1935; Moultrie Packers 1936–1942, 1946–1947; Moultrie Athletics 1948–1949; Moultrie Cubs 1950; Moultrie To-Baks 1951; Moultrie Giants 1952; Moultrie Reds 1955–1956; Moultrie Phillies 1957; Moultrie Colt .22s 1962–1963
- Panama City, FL: Panama City Pilots 1935
- Tallahassee, FL: Tallahassee Capitols/Caps 1935–1942; Tallahassee Pirates 1946–1950 Tallahassee Capitols/Caps
- Thomasville, GA: Thomasville Orioles 1935–1939; Thomasville Tourists 1940; Thomasville Lookouts 1941; Thomasville Tigers 1946–1950; Thomasville Tomcats 1952; Thomasville Dodgers 1953–1958; Thomasville Tigers 1962–1963
- Tifton, GA: Tifton Blue Sox 1951–1953; Tifton Indians 1954; Tifton Blue Sox 1955; Tifton Phillies 1956
- Valdosta, GA: Valdosta Trojans 1939–1942; Valdosta Dodgers 1946–1952; Valdosta Browns 1953; Valdosta Tigers 1954–1958
- Waycross, GA: Waycross Bears 1939–1942, 1946–1955; Waycross Braves 1956–1958, 1963
