= Thomasville Dodgers =

- 1913–1963; (1913–1915, 1935–1941, 1946–1950, 1952–1958, 1962–1963); Thomasville, Georgia

Minor league affiliations
- Previous classes: Class A (1963); Class D (1913–1915, 1935–1941, 1946–1950, 1952–1958, 1962)
- League: Georgia–Florida League (1935–1941, 1946–1950, 1952–1958, 1962–1963)
- Previous leagues: Florida–Alabama–Georgia League (1915); Georgia State League (1914); Empire State League (1913)

Major league affiliations
- Previous teams: Detroit Tigers (1962–1963); Brooklyn/Los Angeles Dodgers (1953–1958); Detroit Tigers (1946–1950); Washington Senators (1940–1941)

Minor league titles
- League titles: 3 (1941, 1962, 1963)

Team data
- Previous names: Thomasville Tigers (1962–1963); Thomasville Dodgers (1953–1958); Thomasville Tomcats (1952); Thomasville Tigers (1946–1950); Thomasville Lookouts (1941); Thomasville Tourists (1940); Thomasville Orioles (1935–1939); Thomasville Hornets (1913–1915)
- Previous parks: Varnedoe Field

Thomasville, Georgia was home to several minor league baseball teams from 1913 to 1963, most of them in the Georgia–Florida League.

== History ==
The Thomasville Hornets played from 1913 to 1915 in the Empire State League, Georgia–Florida League and Florida–Alabama–Georgia League.

Baseball did not return until the Thomasville Orioles arrived in 1935 in the Georgia–Florida League as an affiliate of the Baltimore Orioles of the International League. They became an independent team in 1940 as the Thomasville Tourists and then the Thomasville Lookouts in 1941.

After a shutdown for World War II, the team returned as a Detroit Tigers affiliate called the Thomasville Tigers, which played from 1946 to 1950.

The Americus Rebels moved to Thomasville for the 1952 season and were renamed as the Thomasville Tomcats.

They became a Brooklyn Dodgers affiliate and changed the team name to the Thomasville Dodgers in 1953. They continued in this manner until the league folded in 1958. The league returned in 1962 and so did the team, back with the Tigers for two more years.

== The ballpark ==
Thomasville teams played at Varnedoe Field. Today, Varndedoe Stadium is the home of Thomas University baseball, located at 103 Varnedoe Road Thomasville, Georgia 31792.

== Notable alumni ==
- Dale Alexander (1940); won 1932 AL batting title
- Bob Aspromonte (1957)
- Paul Foytack (1949)
- Frank Lary (1950); 3x MLB All-Star
- Frank Lucchesi (1952)
- Paul Minner (1941)
- Bubba Phillips (1949)
- Rich Reese (1962)
- Pete Reiser (1955), 3x MLB All-Star; won 1941 NL batting title
