= Waycross Braves =

Minor league baseball team

- 1939–1963; (1939–1942, 1946–1958, 1963); Waycross, Georgia

Minor league affiliations
- Previous classes: Class A (1963); Class D (1939–1962)
- League: Georgia–Florida League

Major league affiliations
- Previous teams: Milwaukee Braves (1956–1958, 1963)

Minor league titles
- League titles: 1940; 1942; 1948; 1949; 1951; 1955 (tie)

Team data
- Previous names: Waycross Braves (1956–1958, 1963); Waycross Bears (1939–1942, 1946–1955)
- Previous parks: Memorial Stadium

The Waycross Braves were a minor league baseball team located in Waycross, Georgia, United States. The team started as the Waycross Bears in 1939, and played until 1963 with sporadic breaks. They changed their name to the "Braves" when they became an affiliate of the Milwaukee Braves in 1956. They played in the Georgia–Florida League.

== Team history ==
=== The pre-war years ===
Baseball in Waycross long predated the Bears/Braves, although the relationship was sporadic. Waycross hosted spring training for the 1898 Chicago Colts (later to be renamed the Chicago Cubs). A minor league team called the Waycross Machinists played there for the 1906 season, and from 1913 through 1915, a team called the Blowhards, the Grasshoppers, or the Moguls (depending on the season) bounced around the local minor leagues.

The Waycross Bears were founded in 1939 and played in the Class D Georgia–Florida League. Unlike most of the teams in the league, they did not have an affiliation with a major league team in their early years. Despite this, they had a winning record in their first year. In their second season, 1940, the Bears not only won the Georgia–Florida League pennant, but also defeated the Fort Lauderdale Tarpons of the Florida East Coast League and the Orlando Senators of the Florida State League in cross-league championship games. After another respectable performance in 1941 (finishing 84-54 but losing in the first round of the playoffs), the Bears once again won the league pennant in 1942.

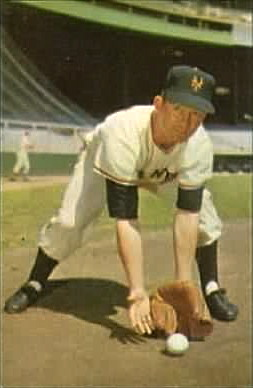
Davey Williams played for the Waycross Bears in 1947 before spending parts of six seasons in the major leagues with the New York Giants.

=== Post-war Bears ===
World War II led the Georgia–Florida League to suspend operations for the 1943, 1944, and 1945 seasons. In 1946, the league returned and so did the Bears. Winning seasons in 1946 and 1947 were followed up by two consecutive league pennants in 1948 and 1949. The Bears had their first losing season in 1950, but followed it up with yet another championship in 1951. In 1955, they played the Brunswick Pirates in the championship series, but the series was cancelled due to weather with the teams tied with one win each. This was the last season that the teams was named the Bears.

=== The Braves Era ===
In 1956, the Bears became an affiliate of the Milwaukee Braves, and changed their name to reflect that, becoming the Waycross Braves. The big-league Braves had recently moved to Milwaukee from Boston, and they set up one of their spring training sites in Waycross. It would remain the spring training for their minor league affiliates throughout the major league team's time in Milwaukee.

Waycross's time as the Braves was short and unremarkable. After only suffering two losing seasons in their 15 years as the Bears, the Braves suffered two more in their next three seasons. After the 1958 season, the league folded, and so did the Waycross Braves.

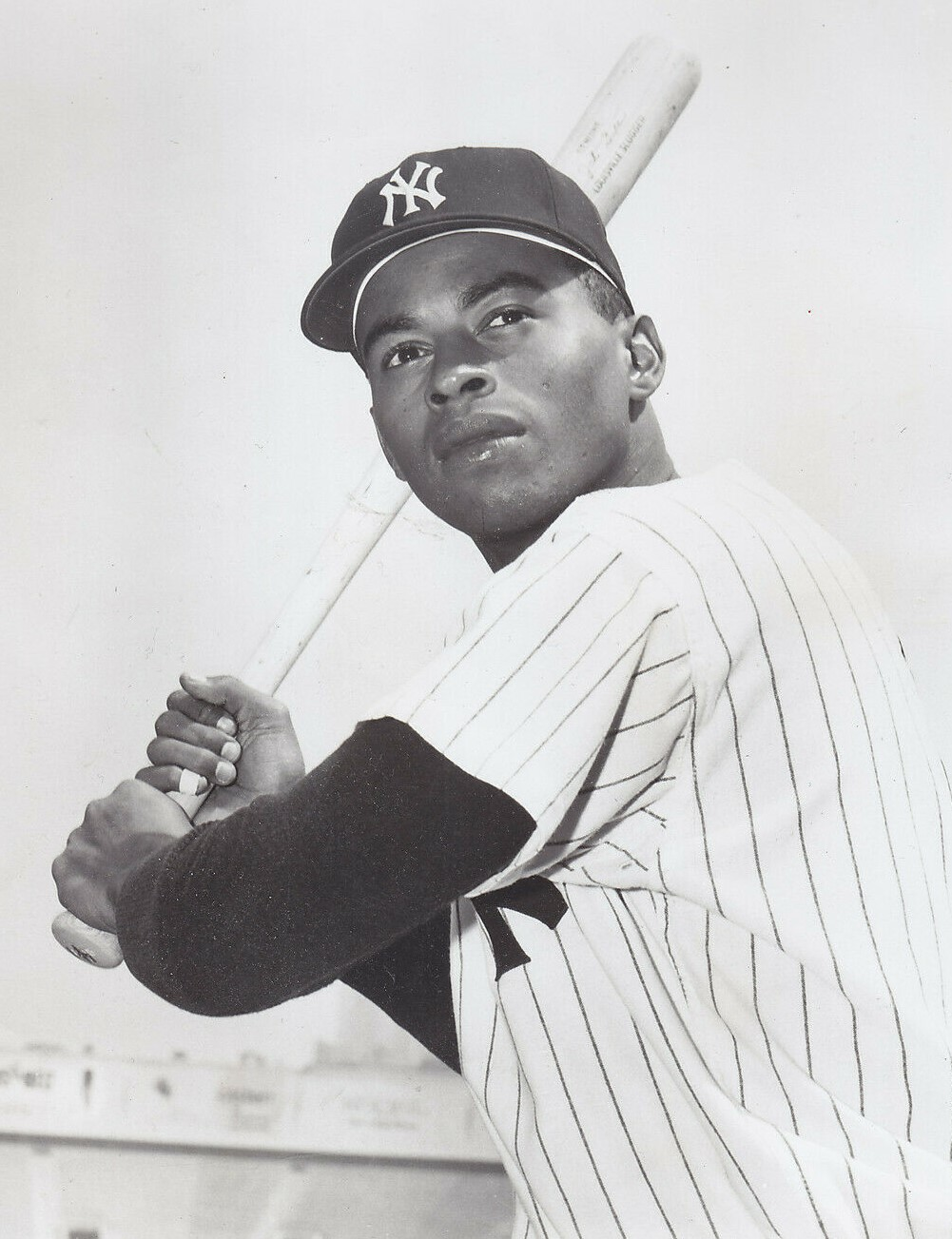
Bill Robinson played for the 1963 Waycross Braves on his way to a 16-season major league career

In 1962, the Georgia–Florida League returned, and the Milwaukee Braves had an affiliate in the league, but this time it was located in Dublin, Georgia. In 1963, the Braves moved back to Waycross and played one more season, but again the Georgia–Florida League folded after the season. Waycross remained a spring training site for the major league Braves until their 1966 move to Atlanta. By 1967, they closed the spring training site, severing the connection between the team and the town.

== Year-by-year record ==
| Year | Record | Finish | Manager | Playoffs |
|---|---|---|---|---|
| 1956 | 79–59 | 2nd | James Deery | none |
| 1957 | 58–81 | 6th | Michael Fandozzi | |
| 1958 | 47–80 | 5th | Everett Robinson | |
| 1963 | 56–63 | 3rd | Bill Steinecke | none |
