= Fitzgerald Pioneers =

- 1948–1957; Fitzgerald, Georgia

Minor league affiliations
- Previous classes: Class D
- League: Georgia–Florida League (1953–1957)
- Previous leagues: Georgia State League (1948–1952)

Major league affiliations
- Previous teams: Baltimore Orioles (1957); Kansas City Athletics (1956); Cincinnati Redlegs (1953–1954)

Minor league titles
- League titles: 1 (1948)

Team data
- Previous names: Fitzgerald Orioles (1957); Fitzgerald Athletics (1956); Fitzgerald Redlegs (1954); Fitzgerald Pioneers (1948–1953)
- Previous parks: Blue & Gray Park

The Fitzgerald Pioneers were a minor league baseball team, based in Fitzgerald, Georgia, that played from 1948 until 1957. The team played in the Class D level Georgia State League and won the league's title in 1948.

Baseball Hall of Fame member Earl Weaver was the player/manager for Fitzgerald in 1957

== History ==
In 1953, the team joined the Georgia–Florida League and became an affiliate of the Cincinnati Redlegs. The following year the team name changed to the Fitzgerald Redlegs, to match their affiliate. In 1956 the team became and affiliate of the Kansas City Athletics and was renamed the Fitzgerald Athletics. Finally in 1957, the team became affiliated with Baltimore Orioles and were renamed the Fitzgerald Orioles and were managed by player/manager Earl Weaver, who was inducted into the Baseball Hall of Fame in 1996.

On July 19, 1952, at Pilots Field against the Statesboro Pilots, Joe Reliford of the visiting Fitzgerald Pioneers, age 12, became the youngest person to play in a professional baseball game. Reliford simultaneously broke the racial barrier for the segregated Georgia State League. A photo of Reliford in uniform is housed in the Baseball Hall of Fame Library in Cooperstown, NY.

During the game, Reliford, playing outfield for one inning, made a catch over the wall, robbing Pilot player Jim Shuster of a home run to end the game. He was congratulated by Pilot fans, who came on the field and cheered him.

== The ballpark ==
Fitzgerald played home games at Blue & Grey Park. The ballpark was located at 301 East Palm Street, Fitzgerald, Georgia 31750.

== Notable alumni ==
- Earl Weaver (1957) Inducted Baseball Hall of Fame, 1996
- Ace Adams (1952) MLB All-Star
- Joe Reliford (1952) Youngest professional and broke league color barrier
