= Albany Cardinals =

- 1935–1958; (1935–1942, 1946–1958); Albany, Georgia

Minor league affiliations
- Class: Class D (1935–1958)
- League: Georgia–Florida League (1935–1958)

Major league affiliations
- Team: St. Louis Cardinals (1938–1942, 1946–1958); St. Louis Cardinals (1936)

Minor league titles
- League titles (4): 1938; 1939; 1952; 1957

Team data
- Name: Albany Cardinals (1939–1958); Albany Travelers (1935–1938)

The Albany Cardinals were a minor league baseball club, based in Albany, Georgia, that existed between 1935 and 1958. It was member of the Class D Georgia–Florida League and an affiliate with the St. Louis Cardinals, through most of their existence. The team began play in 1935 as the Albany Travelers from 1935 through 1938. The took up the Cardinals name in 1939 and won 4 of the league's titles.
