= Georgia State League =

Minor league baseball league active from 1906 until 1956

- Most recent season or competition: 1956 Georgia State League season
- Classification: Class D (1906, 1914, 1920–1921 and 1948–1956)
- Sport: Minor League Baseball
- First season: 1906; 120 years ago
- Folded: 1956; 70 years ago
- Replaced by: Florida–Alabama–Georgia League
- President: J. W. Thomas(1906); I. J. Kalmon (1914); J. P. Nichols, Jr. (1920); H. P. Meikleham (1921); Joseph W. Matt, Jr. (1948–1949); Earl Blue (1950); J.T. Morris (1951); Bill Estroff (1952–1954); W. H. Lovett (1955); Oswald Hadden (1956)
- No. of teams: 28
- Country: United States of America
- Most titles: 2 Vidalia Indians; Douglas Trojans/Douglas Reds
- Related competitions: Georgia–Florida League; Georgia–Alabama League

The Georgia State League was an American Class D minor league in professional baseball that existed in 1906, 1914, 1920–1921 and 1948–1956. During its last incarnation, it existed alongside two nearby Class D circuits, the Georgia–Florida League and the Georgia–Alabama League.

The 1906 version of the league began with six teams, but two clubs were forced to disband and a third to relocate before the league folded on July 9. Then, in 1914 the Empire State League based in Georgia renamed itself Georgia State League. The six-team 1914 league played a full schedule and crowned a champion, the Americus Muckalees. But the resurgence of the league did not even last two years. The circuit started 1915 as the Georgia State League and was renamed the Florida–Alabama–Georgia League (the "FLAG League"), which operated in the state of Florida, on June 15.

After World War I, the league—again featuring half a dozen member clubs—was revived for two full campaigns. In 1920, it was dominated by legendary minor league slugger Ike Boone, who batted .403 and led the GSL in hits, runs and home runs.

The Georgia State League revived in 1948 during the post-World War II boom in minor league baseball. It expanded from six to eight teams in 1949, and by 1952 had begun to attract working agreements with Major League Baseball farm systems. But as the low minors began to experience falling attendance during the 1950s, the GSL began to suffer. Its Statesboro Pilots club disbanded on July 1, 1955, leaving the league with only five teams. The 1956 Georgia State League began and finished the season with a full complement of six teams. The Georgia State League did not return to play in 1957 and never reformed.

== Cities represented ==
- Albany, GA: Albany 1906
- Americus, GA: Americus Pallbearers 1906; Americus Muckalees 1914
- Baxley, GA: Baxley Red Sox 1948
- Baxley, GA & Hazlehurst, GA: Baxley-Hazlehurst Red Socks 1949; Baxley-Hazlehurst Red Sox 1950; Hazlehurst-Baxley Red Sox 1951; Hazlehurst-Baxley Cardinals 1952-1955; Hazlehurst-Baxley Tigers 1956
- Brunswick, GA: Brunswick 1906; Brunswick Pilots 1914
- Carrollton, GA: Carrollton 1920–1921
- Cedartown, GA: Cedartown Cedars 1920–1921
- Columbus, GA: Columbus River Snipes 1906
- Cordele, GA: Cordele 1906; Cordele Ramblers 1914
- Douglas, GA: Douglas Rebels 1948; Douglas Trojans 1949–1955; Douglas Reds 1956
- Dublin, GA: Dublin Green Sox 1949–1952; Dublin Irish 1953–1956
- Griffin, GA: Griffin 1920–1921
- Eastman, GA: Eastman Dodgers 1948–1953
- Fitzgerald, GA: Fitzgerald Pioneers 1948–1952
- Jesup, GA: Jesup Bees 1950–1953
- LaGrange, GA: LaGrange 1920–1921
- Lindale, GA: Lindale Pepperells 1920–1921
- Rome, GA: Rome 1920–1921
- Sandersville, GA: Sandersville Wacos 1953–1954; Sandersville Giants 1955–1956
- Sparta, GA: Sparta Saints 1948–1949
- Statesboro, GA: Statesboro Pilots 1952–1955
- Thomasville, GA: Thomasville Hornets 1914
- Thomson, GA: Thomson Orioles 1956
- Tifton, GA: Tifton Blue Sox 1949–1950
- Valdosta, GA: Valdosta Stars 1906; Valdosta Millionaires 1914
- Vidalia, GA: Vidalia Indians 1952–1956
- Vidalia, GA & Lyons, GA: Vidalia-Lyons Twins 1948–1950
- Waycross, GA: Waycross Machinists 1906; Waycross Grasshoppers 1914

== League champions ==
- 1906 Waycross Machinists
- 1914 Americus Muckalees
- 1920 Carrollton
- 1921 LaGrange
- 1948 Fitzgerald Pioneers
- 1949 Tifton Blue Sox
- 1950 Eastman Dodgers
- 1951 Dublin Green Sox
- 1952 Vidalia Indians
- 1953 Hazlehurst-Baxley Cardinals
- 1954 Vidalia Indians
- 1955 Douglas Trojans and Sandersville Giants
- 1956 Douglas Reds
