= Brunswick Pirates =

- 1951–1963; (1951–1958, 1962–1963); Brunswick, Georgia

Minor league affiliations
- Previous classes: Class A (1963); Class D (1951–1958, 1962)
- League: Georgia–Florida League

Major league affiliations
- Previous teams: St. Louis Cardinals (1962–1963); Philadelphia Phillies (1957–1958); Pittsburgh Pirates (1951–1956)

Minor league titles
- League titles: 2 (1954, 1955)

Team data
- Previous names: Brunswick Cardinals (1962–1963); Brunswick Phillies (1958); Brunswick/Moultrie Phillies (1957); Brunswick Pirates (1951–1956)

The Brunswick Pirates were a minor league baseball team based in Brunswick, Georgia. The team was a member of the Georgia–Florida League and a Class D affiliate of the Pittsburgh Pirates from 1951 to 1956. In 1957 the team played as the Brunswick Phillies and merging with the Moultrie Phillies, splitting their games between Brunswick and Moultrie, Georgia, as an affiliate of the Philadelphia Phillies. The team played solely in Brunswick in 1958, before folding. However, the team became an affiliate of the St. Louis Cardinals in 1962 as the Brunswick Cardinals and played again in 1963, before folding for a second, and final, time.

The team played all their home games in one Stadium, Lanier Field, which was renamed after the team owner, Edo Miller Field in 1953 after his death.

Branch Rickey Jr. was team vice president from their inception in 1951 until their affiliation with the Pittsburgh Pirates ended after the 1956 season.

- Notable players, season with Brunswick:
- Fred Green 1952, set a league record with 265 strikeouts and played for Pittsburgh Pirates and Chicago White Sox.
- Mario Cuomo 1952, left baseball after an injury and went on to become Governor of New York
- Whammy Douglas 1954, set league record 27 wins, one of a handful of players to make it to the major league playing with one eye.
- Bo Belinsky 1956, Played 8 years in the Major Leagues for Los Angeles Angels, Philadelphia Phillies, San Diego Padres, Pittsburgh Pirates and Cincinnati Reds. Threw first no-hitter in Angels team history, at Dodger Stadium.

The Pirates won league titles in 1954 and 1955.
