= Moultrie Packers =

- 1916–1963; (1916–1917, 1935–1942, 1946–1952, 1955–1957, 1962–1963); Moultrie, Georgia

Minor league affiliations
- Previous classes: Class A (1963); Class D (1916–1962)
- League: Georgia–Florida League (1935–1963)
- Previous leagues: Dixie League (1916–1917)

Major league affiliations
- Previous teams: Houston Colt .45's (1962–1963); Philadelphia Phillies (1957); Cincinnati Redlegs (1955–1956); New York Giants (1952); Non-affiliated (1951); Chicago Cubs (1950); Philadelphia Athletics (1948–1949); Non-affiliated (1946–1947); Pittsburgh Pirates (1941–1942); Philadelphia Phillies (1939–1940); Non-affiliated (1938); Boston Red Sox (1937); Chicago White Sox (1935–1936)

Team data
- Previous names: Moultrie Colt .22s (1962–1963); Moultrie/Brunswick Phillies (1957); Moultrie Reds (1955–1956); Moultrie Giants (1952); Moultrie To-baks (1951); Moultrie Cubs (1950); Moultrie Athletics (1948–1949); Moultrie Packers (1936–42, 1946–1947); Leesburg Pirates (1947–1948); Moultrie Steers (1935); Moultrie Packers (1916–1917)
- Previous parks: Holmes Memorial Park

The Moultrie Packers were a class D, and class A minor league baseball team, based in Moultrie, Georgia, founded by J.S. Dillard.

== History ==
Moultrie teams played in the Dixie League from 1916 to 1917 and the Georgia–Florida League from 1935 to 1942, 1946–1952, 1955–1957, and 1962–1963.

In 1935 they were named the Moultrie Steers before reestablishing the Packers moniker, which they used until 1947. Their name then changed frequently until the 1963 season when they disbanded. From 1948 to 1949, the team was named the Moultrie Athletics as an affiliate of the Philadelphia Athletics. In 1950, they were renamed the Moultrie Cubs and a year later, the Moultrie To-baks. The team would be renamed the Moultrie Reds and Moultrie Giants, before merging with a team from Brunswick, Georgia in 1957, and being named the Moultrie/Brunswick Phillies. In 1962, the team finally became the Moultrie Colt .22s, after an affiliation with the Houston Colt .45s.

Overall, Moultrie had affiliations with the Houston Colt .45's (1962–1963), Philadelphia Phillies (1957), Cincinnati Redlegs (1955–1956), New York Giants (1952), Chicago Cubs (1950), Philadelphia Athletics (1948–1949), Pittsburgh Pirates (1941–1942), Philadelphia Phillies (1939–1940), Boston Red Sox (1937) and Chicago White Sox (1935–1936)

== The ballpark ==
Moultrie teams played home minor league games at Holmes Memorial Park. Today, Colquitt County High School is located at the former ballpark site. The high school is located at 1800 Park Avenue SE in Moultrie, Georgia. Colquitt County High School's Sports teams are nicknamed the "Packers."

Moultrie's minor league baseball team played in the old wooden stadium where Mack Thorpe stadium is now. In about 1946 I went to games there with my Dad, Charlie Powell Sr. My favorite player was 1st baseman, Ken Rhynn (sp).

== Notable alumni ==
- Joe Azcue (1956) MLB All-Star
- Gene Bearden (1939) 1948 AL ERA Title
- Tex Hughson (1937) 3 x MLB All-Star
- Bill Voiselle (1938) MLB All-Star
