= Dublin Irish =

- 1949–1962; (1949–1956, 1958, 1962); Dublin, Georgia

Minor league affiliations
- Previous classes: Class D
- League: Georgia–Florida League (1958, 1962)
- Previous leagues: Georgia State League (1949–1956)

Major league affiliations
- Previous teams: Milwaukee Braves (1962); Baltimore Orioles (1958); Pittsburgh Pirates (1953–1956); Cincinnati Reds (1952)

Team data
- Previous names: Dublin Braves (1962); Dublin Orioles (1958); Dublin Irish (1953–1956); Dublin Green Sox (1949–1952)
- Previous parks: Lovett Park

The Dublin Irish were a minor league baseball team based in Dublin, Georgia. The team played in the Georgia State League from 1949 until 1956, however the team was first named the Dublin Green Sox. In 1952 they were first an affiliate of the Cincinnati Reds, however the following year they became affiliated with the Pittsburgh Pirates. The team stayed affiliated with the Pirates until 1956.

Dublin was represented again in the 1958 Georgia–Florida League, as the Dublin Orioles. The Orioles were managed by Earl Weaver, who was inducted in the Hall of Fame in 1996. The Orioles left Dublin after the season, and the city did not field a team until 1962. The Milwaukee Braves placed an affiliate, the Dublin Braves, in Dublin and played there for one last season.

== The ballpark ==
The Irish played at Lovett Park, which was built in 1946 and eventually demolished in 1990. It was located at Kellam Road and Marcus Street.

== Notable alumni ==
- Earl Weaver (1958, MGR) Inducted Baseball Hall of Fame, 1996
- Steve Barber (1958) 2 x MLB All-Star
- Bill Robinson (1962)
