= Americus (baseball) =

- 1906–2002; (1906, 1913–1915, 1935–1942, 1946–1951, 1954, 2002); Americus, Georgia

Minor league affiliations
- Previous classes: Class D
- League: Southeastern League (2002)
- Previous leagues: Georgia–Florida League (1935–1942, 1946–1951, 1954); Florida–Alabama–Georgia League (1915); Georgia State League (1914); Empire State League (1913); Georgia State League (1906)

Major league affiliations
- Previous teams: Baltimore Orioles (1954); Philadelphia Phillies (1946–1950); Chicago Cubs (1942); Brooklyn Dodgers (1939-1940); Washington Senators (1938); Brooklyn Dodgers (1937); St. Louis Cardinals (1936)

Team data
- Previous names: Americus Arrows (2002); Americus-Cordele Orioles (1954); Americus Rebels (1951); Americus Phillies (1946–1950); Americus Pioneers (1939–1942); Americus Cardinals (1935–1938); Americus Mackalees (1913–1915); Americus Pallbearers (1906)

There have been eight Minor leagues teams that have represented the city of Americus, Georgia. Since classification of the minors began, seven of them have been labeled as class D loops and one played in an independent league.

== History ==
=== Americus Pallbearers ===
The Americus Pallbearers became a founding member of the original Georgia State League in 1906. The Pallbearers finished dead-last in the six-team league, with a record of 13–32, a full 22 games behind the first place Waycross Machinists. The league folded at the end of the season, and Americus was without a professional team in 1907.

=== Americus Muckalees ===
The Americus Muckalees were members of the Empire State League in 1913 and continued playing from 1914 to 1915 when the six-team circuit was renamed the Georgia State League.

In 1913, the Muckalees ended in fourth place with a 45–54 record, 13 1/2 games behind first place Valdosta Millionaires. Then, in 1914 the Americus team became the first champion team in Georgia State League history.

But the resurgence of the league did not even last two years. The circuit started 1915 as the Georgia State League and was renamed the Florida–Alabama–Georgia League (FLAG League), which operated in Florida, on June 15. The Americus Muckalees (11–18) then were forced to move to Florida and changed its name to Gainesville Sharks (18–24), ending fifth with a combined 29–42 record, 16 games out of the first place spot.

=== Americus Cardinals ===
The Americus Cardinals operated in the Georgia–Florida League from 1935 through 1938. During that span, Americus had affiliation agreements with the St. Louis Cardinals (1936), Brooklyn Dodgers (1937) and Washington Senators (1938).

The team had records of 59–57 in 1935 (3rd place), 58–58 in 1936 (3rd), 50–71 in 1937 (6th), and 65–61 in 1938 (3rd), reaching the postseason in 1938, but lost in the first round of the playoffs.

=== Americus Pioneers ===
In 1939, the Cardinals changed its name to the Americus Pioneers and continued to operate in the Georgia–Florida League until 1942, first as a Brooklyn Dodgers affiliate (1939–1940) and then with the Chicago Cubs (1942).

This time the team suffered four losing seasons, going 63–76 in 1939 (7th place), 67–72 in 1940 (5th), 56–81 in 1941 (6th) and 49–77 in 1942 (7th).

=== Americus Phillies ===
After a long absence, in 1946 the franchise returned to the Georgia–Florida League as the Americus Phillies, playing there uninterrupted until the 1950 season as a Philadelphia Phillies affiliated team.

In its first season, Americus won the title in the eight-team league after sporting an 87–37 record, having 10 1/2 games of advantage over second place Moultrie Packers. The team won the first round of the playoffs, but lost the final series to Moultrie.

Americus declined the next two years, ending with records of 65–74 in 1947 (6th place) and 50–89 in 1948 (8th). Then, they went 71–67 in 1948 (4th) and 70–67 in 1950 (4th). Both times they reached the postseason, losing in the first round and the league finals, respectively.

=== Americus Rebels ===
In 1951, the Phillies were replaced by the Americus Rebels, though the team lasted only one year in the GFL. Americus finished sixth with a 55–70 mark, 25 1/2 games out of contention.

=== Americus-Cordele Orioles ===
The franchise returned to the league in 1954, this time as the Americus-Cordele Orioles affiliated team of the Baltimore Orioles. Americus finished last of the eight teams with a 51–88 mark and 36 1/2 games out from first place.

=== Americus Arrows ===
Americus also was represented in the independent Southeastern League during its 2002 season. Playing as the Americus Arrows, the team were 10–17 before folding on July 15.

Since then, no other team based in Americus has participated in professional baseball.

== MLB alumni ==
- Pete Center
- Ellis Clary
- Chuck Cottier
- Jack Cusick
- Bill DeKoning
- Bernie DeViveiros
- Bob Geary
- Greek George
- Bill Glynn
- Ray Hamrick
- Stew Hofferth
- Mickey Kreitner
- Guy Lacy
- Angelo LiPetri
- Alex McColl
- Jerry McQuaig
- Cliff Melton
- Hillis Layne
- Red Marion
- Mike Milosevich
- Les Moss
- Bitsy Mott
- Glen Moulder
- Ed Murphy
- Dixie Parker
- Hal Quick
- Jack Sanford
- LeGrant Scott
- Dick West
- Lefty West
- Leonard Martin

== See also ==
- Americus Cardinals players, Americus Phillies players, Americus Pioneers players, Americus Rebels players, Americus-Cordele Orioles players
