= Hazlehurst-Baxley Tigers =

- 1948–1956; Baxley, Georgia

Minor league affiliations
- Class: Class D (1948–1956)
- League: Georgia State League (1948–1956)

Major league affiliations
- Team: Detroit Tigers (1956); St. Louis Cardinals (1952–1955)

Minor league titles
- League titles (1): 1953

Team data
- Name: Hazlehurst-Baxley Tigers (1956); Hazlehurst-Baxley Cardinals (1952–1955); Hazlehurst-Baxley Red Sox (1950–1951); Hazlehurst-Baxley Red Socks (1949); Baxley Red Sox (1948)
- Ballpark: Baxley Baseball Park

The Hazlehurst-Baxley Tigers were a minor league baseball team that represented Baxley and Hazlehurst, Georgia in the Georgia State League in 1956. However the team was first established in 1948 as the Baxley Red Sox. The following season the team was known as the Hazlehurst-Baxley Red Socks and a year later, the Hazlehurst-Baxley Red Sox. In 1952, the team began and affiliation with the St. Louis Cardinals and became the Hazlehurst-Baxley Cardinals.

The Cardinals won the league title in 1953.

== Notable alumni ==
- Bud Metheny (1948)
- Mike Milosevich (1949)
