= Douglas Trojans =

- 1948–1956; Douglas, Georgia

Minor league affiliations
- Class: Class D
- League: Georgia State League

Major league affiliations
- Team: Cincinnati Redlegs (1954–1956)

Minor league titles
- League titles (3): 1951; 1955; 1956

Team data
- Name: Douglas Reds (1956); Douglas Trojans (1949–1955); Douglas Rebels (1948)

The Douglas Trojans were a minor league baseball team, based in Douglas, Georgia that played from 1948 until 1956. The team played in the Class D Georgia State League and won three of the league's titles during their brief existence.

The team was first formed in 1948 as the Douglas Rebels, however the team name changed to the Trojans the following year. In 1954, the team became an affiliate of the Cincinnati Redlegs. During their final year in existence the team was renamed the Douglas Reds.

== Notable alumni ==
- Joe Azcue (1956) MLB All-Star
- Johnny Humphries (1948)
- Johnny Vander Meer (1956) 4 x MLB All-Star
