= Dothan (baseball) =

Dothan (baseball team)
- 1915–1917; Dothan, Alabama

Minor league affiliations
- Class: Class D (1915–1917)
- League: Florida–Alabama–Georgia League (1915) (1916–1917) Dixie League

Major league affiliations
- Team: None

Minor league titles
- League titles (2): 1915; 1916
- Conference titles (1): 1916
- Wild card berths (0): None

Team data
- Name: Dothan (1915–1917)
- Ballpark: Baker Field (1915–1917)

The Dothan team was a minor league baseball team based in Dothan, Alabama. Without a formal nickname, common in the era, Dothan played as members of the 1915 Class D level Florida–Alabama–Georgia League and the Dixie League in 1916 and 1917, winning the 1915 and 1916 league championships. Dothan hosted minor league home games at Baker Field.

Baseball Hall of Fame member Bill Terry played for the 1915 Dothan team at age 16.

== History ==
Dothan, Alabama first hosted minor league play in 1915, when the Dothan team became members of the six–team Class D level Florida–Alabama–Georgia League, which was nicknamed as the "FLAG League." The Americus Muckalees, Brunswick Pilots, Thomasville Hornets, Valdosta Millionaires and Waycross Moguls joined with Dothan in beginning league play on April 26, 1915.

The 1915 Dothan team was nicknamed the "Algas" in some references

In their first season of play, Dothan won the Florida–Alabama–Georgia League championship in a shortened season. On July 17, 1913, the league folded with Dothan in first place with the best overall record. Dothan ended the season with a record of 45–26, as Jack Reidy served as manager. Dothan finished 4.0 games ahead of the second place Waycross Moguls in the final regular season standings. The playoff between half–season champions Valdosta and Brunswick ended with a players strike. Player/manager Jack Reidy led the league with 69 runs scored and teammate Ben Paschal led the league with 7 home runs. Pitcher G.H. Hall led the Florida–Alabama–Georgia League with 14 wins and a 14-5 record.

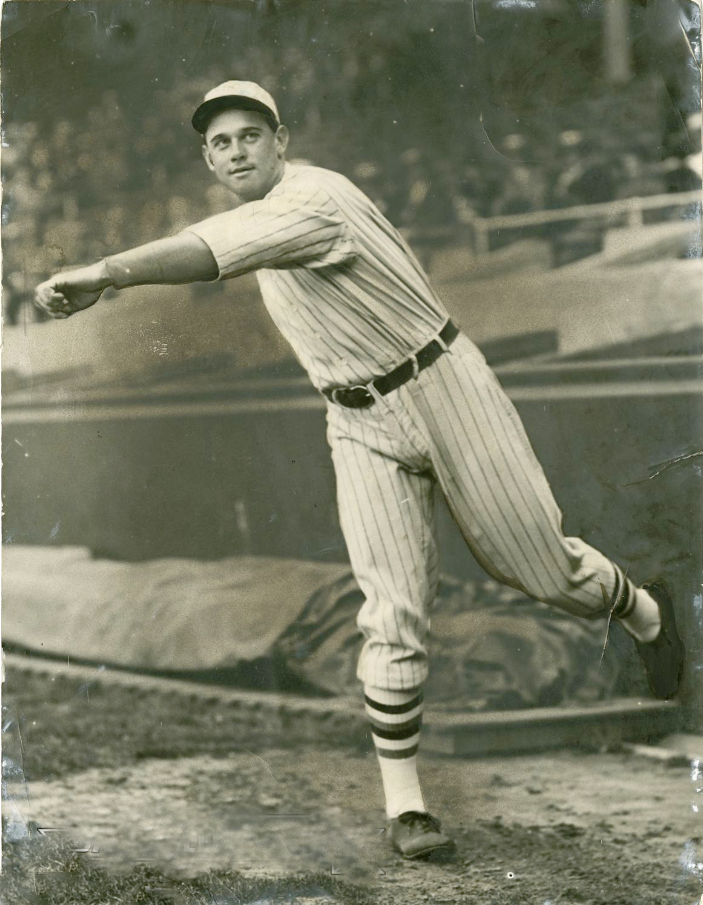
(c. 1923) Baseball Hall of Fame member Bill Terry

Baseball Hall of Fame member Bill Terry played briefly for the 1915 Dothan team at age 16 in his first professional season. Terry was a pitcher in his early career and had a 0-2 record pitching for Dothan, while hitting .200. The left-handed Terry was cut from the team in Mid-May after just three games and reportedly over the protests of manager Jack Reidy. Terry had one performance for Dothan where he walked 10 batters. Terry would evolve into a first baseman, who had a lifetime batting average of .341. and OPS of .899 in his hall of fame career.

In 1916, Dothan continued play in a new league and won a second consecutive championship. The team became charter members of the eight–team Class D level Dixie League.The Bainbridge, Eufaula, Moultrie Packers, Quitman and Valdosta Millionaires teams joined Dothan in beginning league play on May 15, 1916.

Dothan placed first in the 1916 Dixie League final standings. With a 38–22 record, playing under returning player/manager Jack Reidy, the team finished 3.0 games ahead of the second place Eufaula team. Fred Chambers of Dothan won the Dixie League batting title, hitting .348 and leading the league with 9 home runs, while Jack Reidy scored 56 runs, tops in the league. Pitcher Earl Moseley had 13 wins best in the league, while teammate George Dickerson had a perfect record of 11–0 for Dothan.

The 1917 Dixie League folded during the season with Dothan in fourth place in the six-team league. The league folded on July 5, 1917, and Dothan ended their season with a record of 25–30, as the returning Jack Reidy and Frank Manush served as managers. Dothan ended their season finishing 10½ games behind the first place Moultrie team. Lance Richbourg led the Dixie League with 78 total hits and won the league batting title, hitting .345.

The Dixie League did not return to play in the 1918 season. Dothan next hosted minor league baseball when the 1936 Dothan Boll Weevils began play as members of the Alabama–Florida League.

== The ballpark ==
From 1915 to 1917, the Dothan teams hosted minor league home games exclusively at Baker Field.

== Timeline ==
Year(s)	# Yrs.	Team	Level	League	Ballpark
1915	1	Dothan	Class D	Florida–Alabama–Georgia League	Baker Field
1916–1917	2	Dothan	Class D	Dixie League	Baker Field

== Year–by–year records ==
Year	Record	Finish	Manager	Playoffs/Notes
1915	45–26	1st	Jack Reidy	League folded July 17; League champions
1916	38–22	1st	Jack Reidy	No playoffs held League champions
1917	25–30	4th	Jack Reidy / Frank Manush	League folded July 5

== Notable alumni ==
- Bill Terry (1915) Inducted Baseball Hall of Fame, 1954
- George Dickerson (1916)
- Shovel Hodge (1915)
- Ken Holloway (1917)
- Ben Paschal (1915)
- Lance Richbourg (1916–1917)
- Frank Manush (1917, MGR)
- Earl Moseley (1916)
- Zack Taylor (1916–1917)

== See also ==
- Dothan (minor league baseball) players
