= 1972 in baseball =

The following are the baseball events of the year 1972 throughout the world.

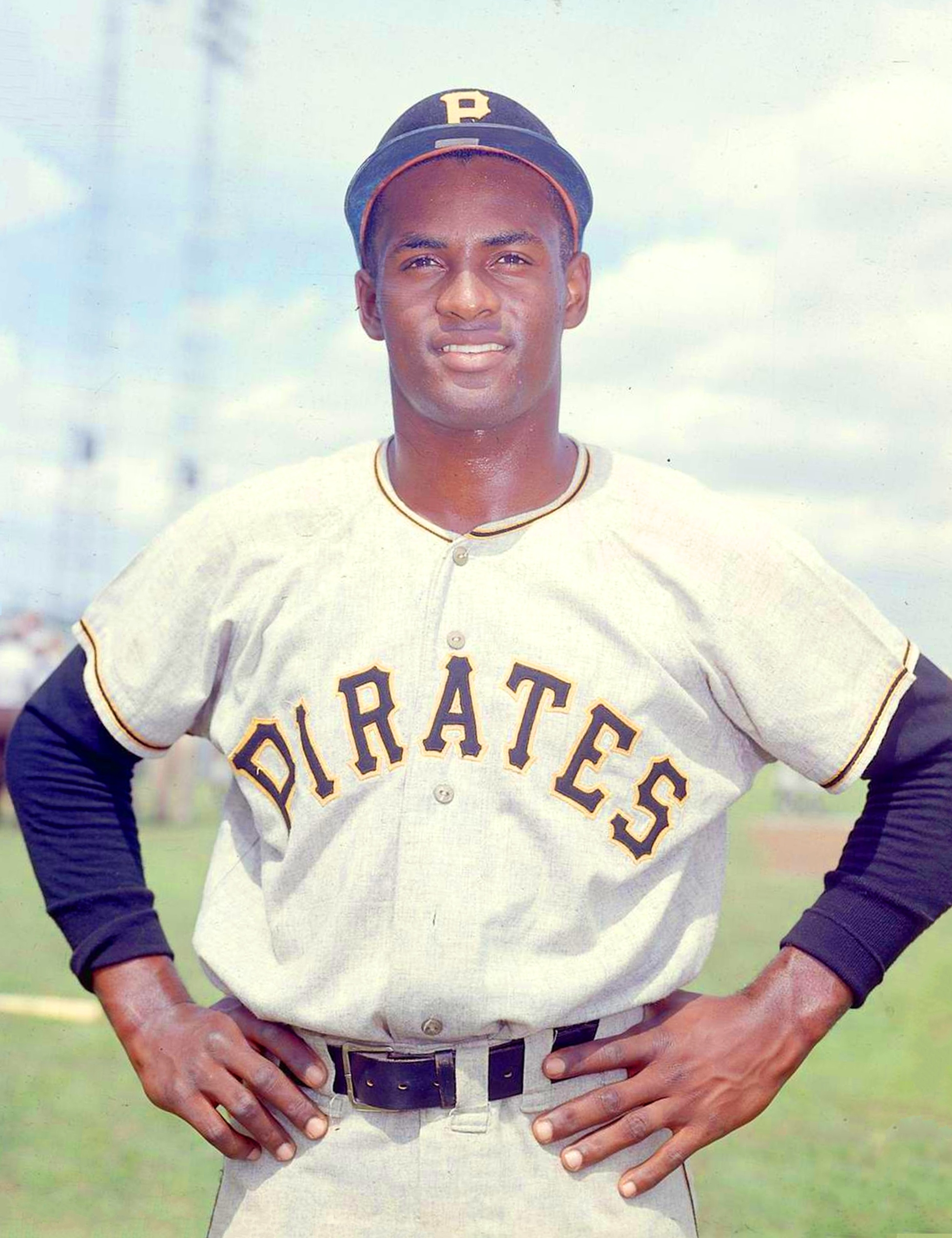
Roberto Clemente (August 18, 1934 – December 31, 1972)

== Labor strife and more moving ==
1972 was tainted by a players' strike over pension and salary arbitration. The strike erased the first week and a half of the season, and the Leagues decided to just excise the lost portion of the season with no makeups. As a result, an uneven number of games were cancelled for each team; some as few as six, some as many as nine. The lack of makeups of those games, even when they affected playoffs, led to the Boston Red Sox losing the American League East by half a game to the Detroit Tigers.

1972 marked the first year for the Texas Rangers, who had moved to Arlington from Washington, D.C. (where they played as the Washington Senators), after the 1971 season. There would be no baseball in D.C. until 2005. The team was one of the worst ever fielded by the franchise, losing 100 games for the first time since 1964. Manager Ted Williams hated living in the Dallas-Fort Worth area, and resigned at the end of the season.

1972 would mark the Kansas City Royals' final year at Kansas City Municipal Stadium, as the next year they would move to Royals Stadium (later named Kauffman Stadium) at the Truman Sports Complex in suburban Kansas City.

The World Series was won by the Oakland Athletics, the first of three straight behind the bats of Reggie Jackson and Bert Campaneris, and the pitching cadre of Catfish Hunter, Rollie Fingers and Vida Blue. The year ended on a sad note when Roberto Clemente died in an airplane crash off the coast of San Juan, Puerto Rico, on New Year's Eve, while participating in aid efforts after the 1972 Nicaragua earthquake.

== Champions ==
=== Major League Baseball ===
League Championship Series (ALCS, NLCS)
East	Detroit	2
West	Oakland	3
East	Pittsburgh	2
West	Cincinnati	3

World Series
AL	Oakland	4
NL	Cincinnati	3

- World Series MVP: Gene Tenace
- All-Star Game, July 25 at Atlanta–Fulton County Stadium: National League, 4–3 (10 innings); Joe Morgan, MVP

=== Other champions ===
- Amateur World Series: Cuba
- College World Series: USC
- Japan Series: Yomiuri Giants over Hankyu Braves (4–1)
- Big League World Series: Orlando, Florida
- Little League World Series: Taipei, Taiwan
- Senior League World Series: Pingtung, Taiwan

Winter Leagues

- 1972 Caribbean Series: Leones de Ponce
- Dominican Republic League: Águilas Cibaeñas
- Mexican Pacific League: Algodoneros de Guasave
- Puerto Rican League: Leones de Ponce
- Venezuelan League: Tigres de Aragua

== Awards and honors ==
- Baseball Hall of Fame
  - Yogi Berra
  - Josh Gibson
  - Lefty Gomez
  - Sandy Koufax (at 36, the youngest inductee ever)
  - Buck Leonard
  - Early Wynn
  - Ross Youngs
  - Will Harridge (executive)

Baseball Writers' Association of America Awards
BBWAA Award	National League	American League
Rookie of the Year	Jon Matlack (NYM)	Carlton Fisk (BOS)
Cy Young Award	Steve Carlton (PHI)	Gaylord Perry (CLE)
Most Valuable Player	Johnny Bench (CIN)	Dick Allen (CWS)
Babe Ruth Award (World Series MVP)	—	Gene Tenace (OAK)
Gold Glove Awards
Position	National League	American League
Pitcher	Bob Gibson (STL)	Jim Kaat (MIN)
Catcher	Johnny Bench (CIN)	Carlton Fisk (BOS)
1st Base	Wes Parker (LAD)	George Scott (MIL)
2nd Base	Félix Millán (ATL)	Doug Griffin (BOS)
3rd Base	Doug Rader (HOU)	Brooks Robinson (BAL)
Shortstop	Larry Bowa (PHI)	Ed Brinkman (DET)
Outfield	César Cedeño (HOU)	Ken Berry (CAL)
Outfield	Roberto Clemente (PIT)	Paul Blair (BAL)
Outfield	Willie Davis (LAD)	Bobby Murcer (NYY)

== Statistical leaders ==
	American League		National League	
Stat	Player	Total	Player	Total
AVG	Rod Carew (MIN)	.318	Billy Williams (CHC)	.333
HR	Dick Allen (CWS)	37	Johnny Bench (CIN)	40
RBI	Dick Allen (CWS)	113	Johnny Bench (CIN)	125
W	Gaylord Perry (CLE); Wilbur Wood (CWS)	24	Steve Carlton^{1} (PHI)	27
ERA	Luis Tiant (BOS)	1.91	Steve Carlton^{1} (PHI)	1.97
K	Nolan Ryan (CAL)	329	Steve Carlton^{1} (PHI)	310

^{1} National League Triple Crown pitching winner

== Major league baseball final standings ==
=== American League final standings ===
AL East
Team	W	L	Pct.	GB	Home	Road
^{(2)} Detroit Tigers	86	70	.551	—	44‍–‍34	42‍–‍36
Boston Red Sox	85	70	.548	½	52‍–‍26	33‍–‍44
Baltimore Orioles	80	74	.519	5	38‍–‍39	42‍–‍35
New York Yankees	79	76	.510	6½	46‍–‍31	33‍–‍45
Cleveland Indians	72	84	.462	14	43‍–‍34	29‍–‍50
Milwaukee Brewers	65	91	.417	21	37‍–‍42	28‍–‍49

AL West
Team	W	L	Pct.	GB	Home	Road
^{(1)} Oakland Athletics	93	62	.600	—	48‍–‍29	45‍–‍33
Chicago White Sox	87	67	.565	5½	55‍–‍23	32‍–‍44
Minnesota Twins	77	77	.500	15½	42‍–‍32	35‍–‍45
Kansas City Royals	76	78	.494	16½	44‍–‍33	32‍–‍45
California Angels	75	80	.484	18	44‍–‍36	31‍–‍44
Texas Rangers	54	100	.351	38½	31‍–‍46	23‍–‍54

Locations of teams for the 1972 American League season
West East

=== National League final standings ===
NL East
Team	W	L	Pct.	GB	Home	Road
^{(2)} Pittsburgh Pirates	96	59	.619	—	49‍–‍29	47‍–‍30
Chicago Cubs	85	70	.548	11	46‍–‍31	39‍–‍39
New York Mets	83	73	.532	13½	41‍–‍37	42‍–‍36
St. Louis Cardinals	75	81	.481	21½	40‍–‍37	35‍–‍44
Montreal Expos	70	86	.449	26½	35‍–‍43	35‍–‍43
Philadelphia Phillies	59	97	.378	37½	28‍–‍51	31‍–‍46

NL West
Team	W	L	Pct.	GB	Home	Road
^{(1)} Cincinnati Reds	95	59	.617	—	42‍–‍34	53‍–‍25
Houston Astros	84	69	.549	10½	41‍–‍36	43‍–‍33
Los Angeles Dodgers	85	70	.548	10½	41‍–‍34	44‍–‍36
Atlanta Braves	70	84	.455	25	36‍–‍41	34‍–‍43
San Francisco Giants	69	86	.445	26½	34‍–‍43	35‍–‍43
San Diego Padres	58	95	.379	36½	26‍–‍54	32‍–‍41

Locations of teams for the 1971–1976 National League seasons
West East

== Nippon Professional Baseball final standings ==
=== Central League final standings ===
Central League
Pos	Team	G	W	L	T	Pct.	GB
1	Yomiuri Giants	130	74	52	4	.587	—
2	Hanshin Tigers	130	71	56	3	.559	3.5
3	Chunichi Dragons	130	67	59	4	.532	7.0
4	Yakult Atoms	130	60	67	3	.472	14.5
5	Taiyo Whales	130	57	69	4	.452	17.0
6	Hiroshima Toyo Carp	130	49	75	6	.395	24.0

== Pacific League final standings ==
Pacific League
Pos	Team	G	W	L	T	Pct.	GB
1	Hankyu Braves	130	80	48	2	.625	—
2	Kintetsu Buffaloes	130	64	60	6	.5161	14.0
3	Nankai Hawks	130	65	61	4	.5158	14.0
4	Toei Flyers	130	63	61	6	.508	15.0
5	Lotte Orions	130	59	68	3	.465	20.5
6	Nishitetsu Lions	130	47	80	3	.370	32.5

== Events ==
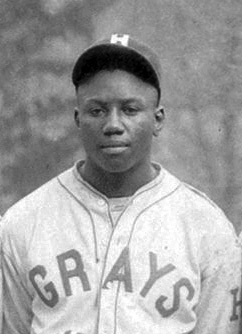
Josh Gibson in 1931

=== January ===
- January 6 – In Macon, Georgia, Oakland Athletics starting pitcher John "Blue Moon" Odom sustains two non-life-threatening gunshot wounds when he confronts a man suspected of burglarizing his mother's neighbor's home. The right-hander expects to recover in time for spring training.
- January 10 – The Chicago Cubs sign 24-game-winner Ferguson Jenkins, reigning winner of the National League Cy Young Award, to a two-year contract for $125,000 per annum. It's the richest contract to date in Cubs' history.
- January 13 – Bernice Gera, an aspiring umpire from the Borough of Queens, wins her discrimination suit in the New York Court of Appeals, opening the door for her to become the first female arbiter in professional baseball. Gera, 40, graduated from a Florida umpiring school in 1969, but has been denied employment in the minor leagues, resulting in her lawsuit.
- January 19 – The Baseball Writers' Association of America elects Sandy Koufax, Yogi Berra and Early Wynn to the Baseball Hall of Fame. Koufax makes it in his first try and, at 36, is the youngest honoree in history.
- January 20 – The Chicago Cubs trade outfielder Johnny Callison to the New York Yankees for relief pitcher Jack Aker, a "Player to be Named Later" (PTBNL) who is added to the deal on May 17.
- January 29 – The New York Yankees announce details of a major renovation of their iconic stadium in the Bronx, "The House that Ruth Built," as it approaches its 50th birthday in 1973. Under the plan, New York City will buy the stadium and land from Rice University and the Knights of Columbus and construction will begin after the 1973 baseball season, with the Yankees playing at Shea Stadium in 1974. It calls for the revamped "Yankee Stadium II" to be ready by Opening Day, 1975.
- January 30 – The Baseball Hall of Fame's Veterans Committee elects three to enter the Cooperstown institution: former pitcher Lefty Gomez, 63, and deceased outfielder Ross Youngs and executive Will Harridge.

=== February ===
- February 8 – Commissioner of Baseball Bowie Kuhn announces that the Special Committee on the Negro Leagues has selected Josh Gibson and Buck Leonard for the Hall of Fame.
- February 21 – Seeking to control expenses, 21 of the 24 major-league teams decide to shorten spring training drills by one week. The only clubs opening camps this month are the Boston Red Sox, New York Mets and Pittsburgh Pirates.
- February 25
  - The Philadelphia Phillies make one of the most important trades in their history, acquiring southpaw starting pitcher and future Baseball Hall of Famer Steve Carlton from the St. Louis Cardinals for right-hander Rick Wise. Carlton is dealt after Cardinals owner August A. Busch Jr., infuriated by a contract impasse, publicly orders his front office to trade the young star. Carlton will spend 15 years in a Phillie uniform, win 20 or more games five times (and go 241–161 with a 3.09 ERA in 741 games pitched), capture four National League Cy Young Awards, make seven All-Star teams, and lead the Phillies to two pennants and their first-ever World Series championship.
  - The Major League Baseball Players Association rejects the owners' initial proposal for a new collective bargaining agreement to take effect at midnight April 1, when the current CBA expires. In their offer, the owners have refused any cost-of-living increase in the pension plan, nor have they proposed any added assistance to former players or widows. The union's vote raises the possibility of a work stoppage on the eve of the 1972 regular season.
- February 29 – Hank Aaron of the Atlanta Braves becomes the highest-paid athlete in baseball history when he signs a three-year, $600,000 contract. Aaron, 38, is believed to be the first player to earn a $200,000 annual salary. He currently has 639 career home runs—75 short of tying Babe Ruth—over 18 MLB seasons.

=== March ===
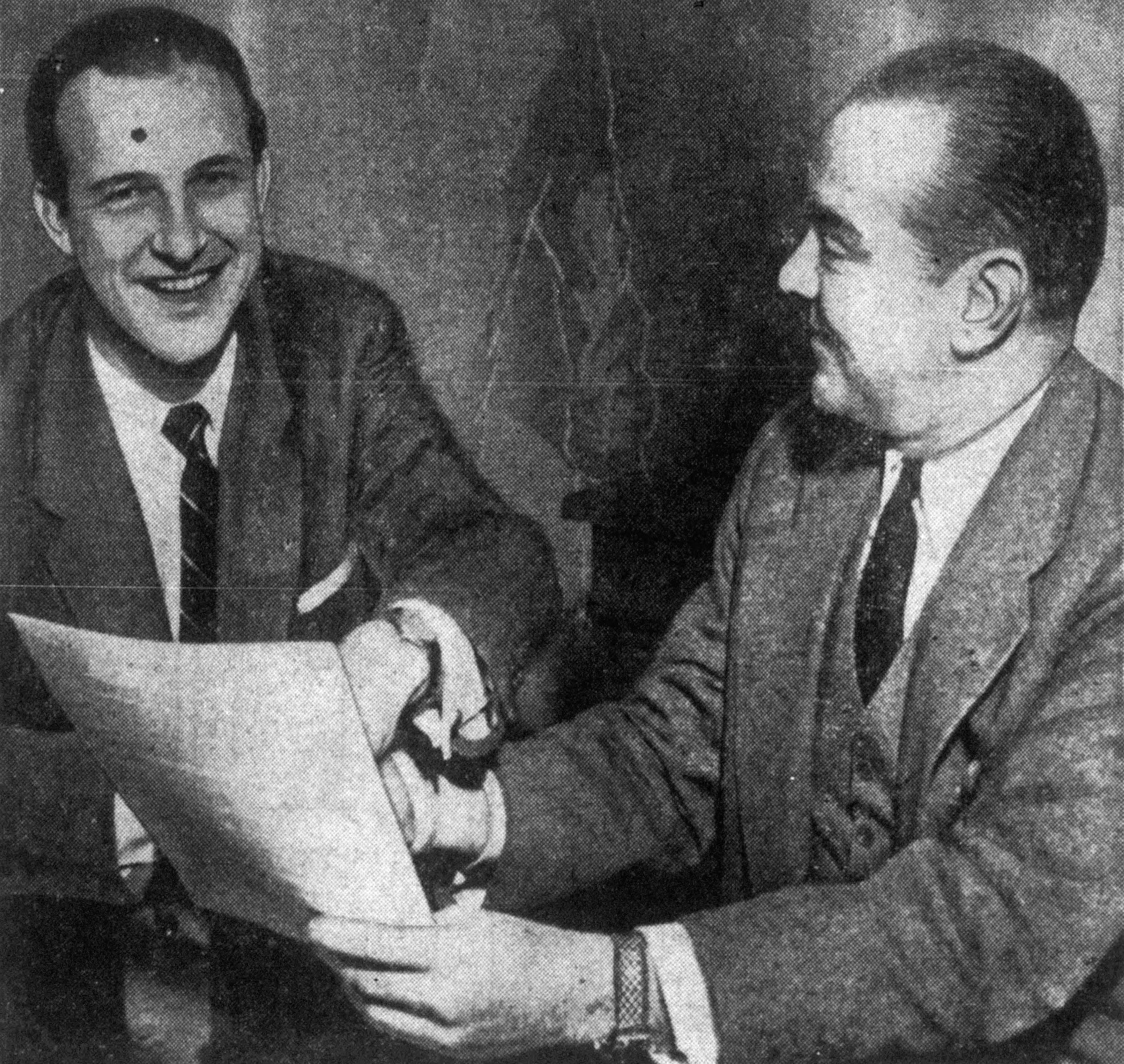
August A. Busch Jr. (R) with Stan Musial in 1954

- March 4 – Former (1968) American League Cy Young Award winner and MVP Denny McLain, coming off a 22-loss season as a member of the final edition of the 1961–1971 Washington Senators, is traded by the relocated Texas Rangers to the Oakland Athletics for pitchers Jim Panther and Don Stanhouse. The deal will fail to revive McLain's career: he appears in only five games with Oakland before being traded, and he is out of baseball before his 29th birthday in March 1973.
- March 6
  - Food industry tycoon Vernon Stouffer sells the Cleveland Indians to a local investor group headed by Nick Mileti, who owns the NBA's Cleveland Cavaliers and the city's minor-league hockey franchise, the Barons. The sale price is reported to be $9 million, $500,000 greater than the offer Stouffer spurned from George Steinbrenner's ownership syndicate only three months before, and well below the owner's asking price of $10 million.
  - The New York Mets learn that their prized off-season acquisition, Jim Fregosi, may miss the rest of spring training when he suffers a fractured thumb. Fregosi—obtained from the California Angels in a December trade for young Mets' hurler Nolan Ryan and three other players—is injured as he's taking ground balls while converting from his traditional position, shortstop, to a third baseman.
- March 7 – The St. Louis Cardinals invoke the reserve clause and unilaterally renew the contracts of holdouts Jerry Reuss and Ted Simmons. St. Louis, which currently boasts the highest payroll in MLB, traded Steve Carlton in February; meanwhile, reigning National League MVP and batting champion Joe Torre remains locked in a contract stalemate with owner August A. Busch Jr.
- March 16 – The American League's reigning Cy Young- and MVP-award winner, Vida Blue, announces his retirement at age 22. Blue, who made $14,750 during 1971, has been battling owner Charles O. Finley over salary, and the sides are far apart. Says Finley, who has offered Blue $50,000, "Either he plays for what we've offered, or he's through in baseball." Blue's retirement will be a short one: he will rejoin the Oakland Athletics on May 2, signing a 1972 contract for $63,000.
- March 22
  - Nine days from the expiration of the existing collective bargaining agreement, major league owners unanimously refuse to increase pension benefits for big-league players—defying the players' union to hit the picket lines. Says outspoken hardliner Gussie Busch: "We're not going to give them another god-damn cent. If they want to strike, let them strike."
  - The New York Yankees acquire 27-year-old left-handed relief pitcher Sparky Lyle from their bitter rivals, the Boston Red Sox, for first baseman Danny Cater and shortstop Mario Guerrero ("PTBNL"). The trade is a one-sided victory for the Yankees, for whom Lyle will go 57–40 (2.41 ERA) with 141 saves (leading the American League in 1972 and 1976) in 420 games over the next seven seasons. He also will win the 1977 AL Cy Young Award as the Junior Circuit's first reliever to be so honored; he will help the Yankees win three pennants and two World Series (1977, 1978).
- March 24 – The St. Louis Cardinals trade second baseman Julián Javier, 35, a two-time World Series champion and 2x All-Star, to the Cincinnati Reds for pitcher Tony Cloninger, 31, a former 24-game winner. The coming season will be the last MLB campaign for both players.
- March 30 – Marvin Miller, executive director of the players' union, reveals that MLBPA rank-and-file members polled at all 24 training camps have voted, 663–10 with two abstentions, to authorize a strike when the CBA with owners expires at midnight tomorrow. Miller will meet in Dallas with 48 player representatives tomorrow for the strike vote itself.

=== April ===
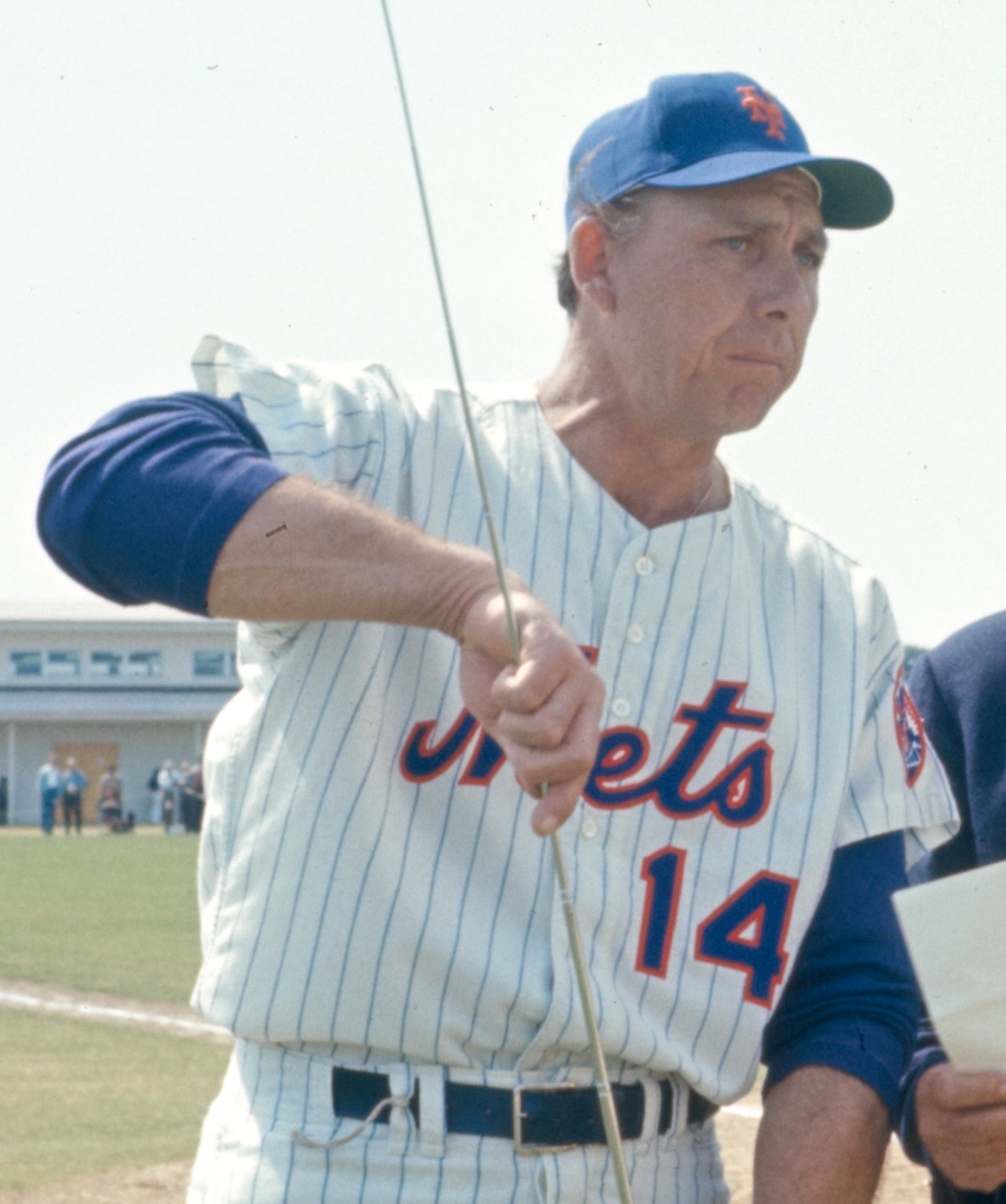
Gil Hodges

- April 1–13 – The first players' strike in modern baseball history wipes 6–8 games off the schedule of each MLB team, 86 games in all. Its results include:
  - Owners agree to add salary arbitration to the collective bargaining agreement, and increase pension fund payments by $500,000, largely from interest earned on the fund itself.
  - Regular-season games lost to the strike are canceled outright; they won't even be played to resolve pennant races. The irregular schedule will enable the Detroit Tigers (who play 156 games) to edge the Boston Red Sox (155) by one-half game to win the American League East championship.
  - Owners lose an estimated $5 million in gate receipts and players forfeit their salaries during the strike period.
- April 2 – Gil Hodges, 47, manager of the New York Mets since 1968 and a future Baseball Hall of Famer as the star first baseman of the Brooklyn Dodgers of the 1950s, suffers a fatal heart attack after a day of golf with his coaching staff in West Palm Beach, Florida. (See Deaths entry for this date below.) His unexpected death sends waves of shock and grief throughout baseball. Hodges' funeral mass is celebrated April 6 at his parish church in Brooklyn, where he has lived since 1948. One day later, Hall-of-Fame catcher Yogi Berra, a Mets' coach, is named his successor at the club's helm.
- April 3 – The Cleveland Indians reacquire outfielder Roy Foster from the Texas Rangers, along with first baseman Tom McCraw, for outfielder Ted Ford. Foster, 26, who had slugged 23 homers in his rookie season for Cleveland in 1970, was traded to the Rangers in an eight-player deal on December 2, 1971.
- April 5 – The Mets, in the midst of mourning Gil Hodges, complete a major trade with a division rival, the Montreal Expos, acquiring five-time National League All-Star outfielder Rusty Staub, 28, for three young players: first baseman Mike Jorgensen (23), shortstop Tim Foli (21), and outfielder Ken Singleton (24). Staub will help lead the 1973 Mets to the NL pennant (and bat .423 in the World Series), while Jorgensen, Foli and Singleton become regular members of the Expos' lineup. The Mets withhold announcing the deal until April 7, the day after Hodges' funeral.
- April 15
  - The major league season finally gets underway after the 13-day player strike. In the first game in the history of the relocated Texas Rangers, played at Anaheim Stadium, the California Angels' Andy Messersmith tosses a two-hit, complete game shutout and Sandy Alomar Sr. scores the only run of the game on a wild pitch in a ninth-inning, "walk-off" 1–0 Angel victory. The Rangers are held hitless until the seventh, when Hal King leads off with a single, the first safety in the club's North Texas era.
  - The St. Louis Cardinals deal another southpaw starting pitcher, this time Jerry Reuss, who's sent to the Houston Astros for righty Scipio Spinks and lefty Lance Clemons. Reuss, only 22, had won 14 games for the 1971 Redbirds.
- April 16
  - At Wrigley Field, Burt Hooton of the Chicago Cubs no-hits the Philadelphia Phillies, 4–0. Hooton walks seven and fans seven. Still technically a rookie, Hooton hurls the no-no in his fourth-ever MLB start.
  - At the Astrodome, towering sophomore slugger Dave Kingman hits for the cycle in a 10–6 San Francisco Giants triumph over Houston.
- April 19 – The Oakland Athletics sign veteran right-hander Joe Horlen as a free-agent. The 34-year-old had won 113 games for the Chicago White Sox before his unconditional release April 2.
- April 21 – The Texas Rangers play their first-ever home opener at Arlington Stadium. Before 20,105 fans, former Washington Senator hero Frank Howard hits the first home run in Rangers' history (home or away), a solo shot against Clyde Wright, as Texas defeats the California Angels, 7–6.
- April 26
  - The Houston Astros win their ninth straight game, defeating the Chicago Cubs 5–4 in ten innings at the Astrodome.
  - The season is only 11 days old when the San Diego Padres dismiss manager Preston Gómez and replace him with coach Don Zimmer. The Padres' only pilot since they entered MLB in 1969, Gómez departs with a 180–316 (.363) record over all or parts of four seasons. For Zimmer, the San Diego job is his first managing assignment in the majors.
- April 29 – Don Zimmer gets his first win as a manager, when the Padres defeat the Philadelphia Phillies, 4–0, at San Diego Stadium. The winning pitcher is Steve Arlin, who'll finish the season with a league-leading 21 losses; the loser, Steve Carlton, will lead the NL in victories with 27.

=== May ===
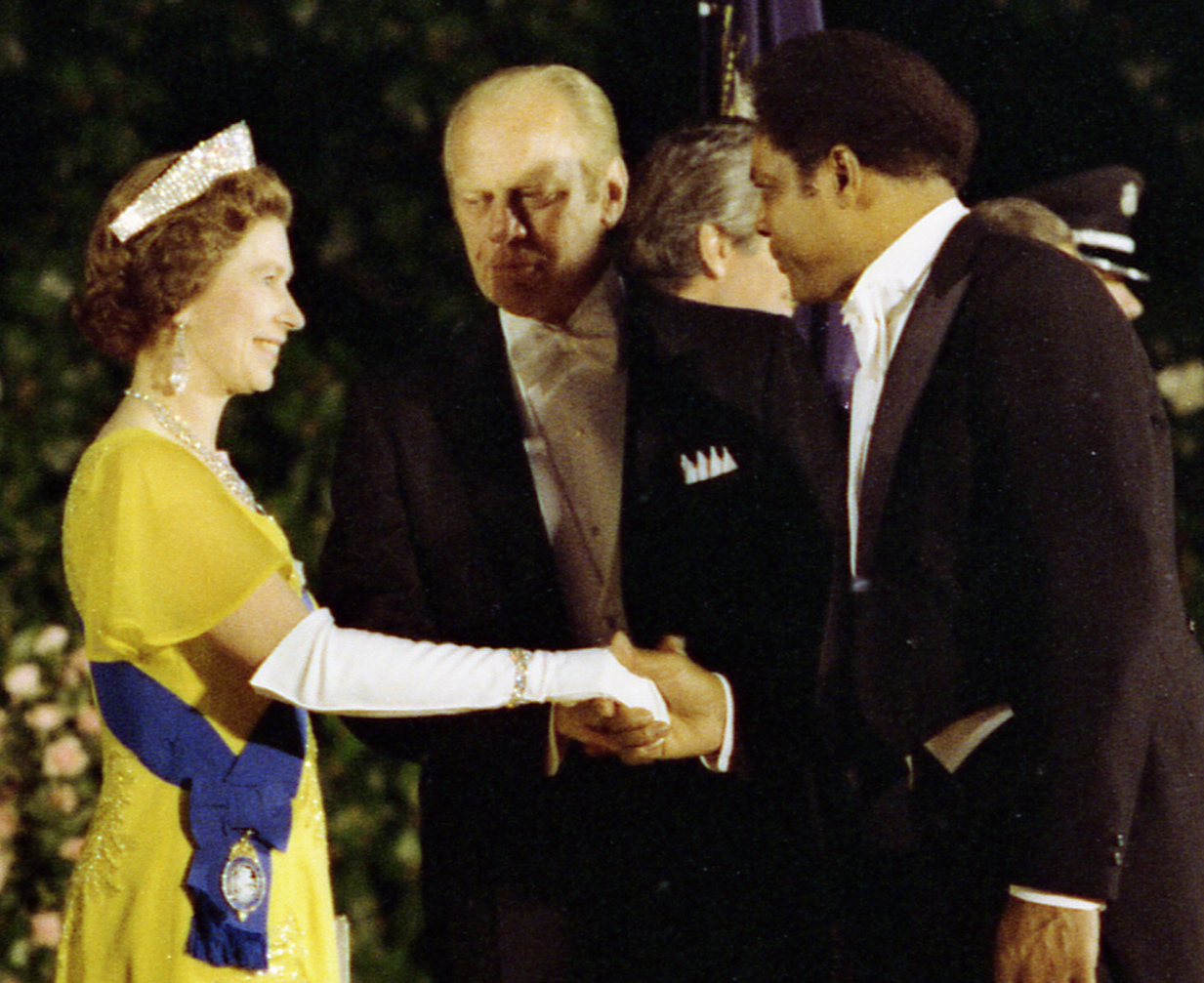
Willie Mays is introduced to Queen Elizabeth II by President Gerald Ford in 1976

- May 5 – The Kansas City Royals deal hard-hitting first baseman Bob Oliver to the California Angels for right-hander Tom Murphy.
- May 11 – A legend in New York since he launched his Hall-of-Fame MLB career as the "Say Hey Kid" with the baseball Giants (1951–1952, 1954–1957), Willie Mays, now 41, returns to his original National League home city when the San Francisco Giants trade him to the New York Mets for 24-year-old pitcher Charlie Williams and $50,000. Mays leaves the financially struggling Giants after 21 seasons, 3,187 hits and 646 home runs; his $165,000 annual contract runs through the end of 1973.
- May 12 – At Bloomington, Minnesota, the Milwaukee Brewers and Minnesota Twins battle to a 3–3 tie after 21 innings before the game is suspended. When it resumes on the following day (May 13), Milwaukee's Mike Ferraro singles in what proves to be the winning tally in the top of the 22nd. The contest is the longest by innings played in the majors in 1972.
- May 14 – In front of a Mother's Day crowd of 35,505 in Shea Stadium, Willie Mays makes a triumphant homecoming to New York with the Mets, belting a game-winning home run against his old teammates, the Giants. Leading off and playing first base, Mays walks and scores in the first inning on Rusty Staub's grand slam, then his solo homer in the fifth snaps a 4–4 tie. The final score: New York 5, San Francisco 4.
- May 16 – Philadelphia Phillies rookie outfielder Greg Luzinski blasts a 500-foot home run off the Liberty Bell at Philadelphia's one-year-old Veterans Stadium.
- May 17 – The San Diego Padres deal 28-year-old outfielder "Downtown" Ollie Brown to the Oakland Athletics for catcher/outfielder Curt Blefary, pitcher Mike Kilkenny and a PTBNL (outfielder Greg Schubert). Original Padre Brown was San Diego's first choice in the 1968 NL Expansion Draft.
- May 19 – The Cincinnati Reds trade outfielder Bernie Carbo to the St. Louis Cardinals for first baseman Joe Hague. Carbo, 24, was Cincinnati's top selection (16th overall) in the inaugural 1965 June amateur craft, chosen ahead of Johnny Bench. He also was the runner-up, to Carl Morton, in the voting for the 1970 NL Rookie of the Year Award.
- May 21 – The New York Mets win their 11th straight game, and 14th out of their last 15, defeating the homestanding Phillies, 4–3. Tom Seaver improves to 7–1 and the winning blow is struck by Willie Mays, with a two-run homer in the eighth inning. The win improves the Mets' record to 25–7, and they hold a six-game lead in the National League East over the 18–12 Pittsburgh Pirates.
- May 23 – Tossing a three-hitter, Gaylord Perry wins his eighth game against two losses, as his surprising Cleveland Indians shut out the New York Yankees in the Bronx, 3–0. Cleveland, losers of 101 games in 1971, sits in first place in the American League East with an 18–10 record.
- May 28 – The Milwaukee Brewers fire manager Dave Bristol, replacing him with Del Crandall, former All-Star catcher of the Milwaukee Braves. Coach Roy McMillan takes over as interim skipper until Crandall arrives and guides the team to a 4–1 loss to the Boston Red Sox.

=== June ===
- June 1 – Paul Richards, vice president/player personnel and de facto general manager of the Atlanta Braves since August 31, 1966, is replaced by director of player development Eddie Robinson as leader of the 18–22 team's front office.
- June 3
  - In a move similar to Atlanta's two days earlier, the Philadelphia Phillies, mired in a 2–18 slump, fire veteran general manager John J. Quinn and promote farm system boss Paul Owens to replace him. Owens will spend over a dozen years as GM and build the Phillies into a contender that wins five National League East titles, two NL pennants, and, in 1980, the first World Series championship in franchise history.
  - The 13th inning brings good fortune to the New York Yankees, as they score eight runs in the top of the 13th to overwhelm the Chicago White Sox, 18–10, at Comiskey Park. Thurman Munson and Bobby Murcer belt home runs in the Yanks' big inning, but five of their eight tallies are unearned. Their 18 runs scored are most by an AL team in 1972.

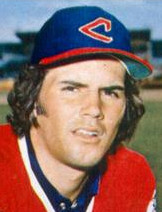
Dennis Eckersley

- June 6 – The San Diego Padres select Dave Roberts, third baseman for the Oregon Ducks of the NCAA, first overall in the 1972 June amateur draft. The lottery's third round yields two future Hall of Famers: pitcher Dennis Eckersley, selected 50th overall by the Cleveland Indians, and catcher Gary Carter, picked by the Montreal Expos three spots after Eckersley.
- June 7
  - Five Pittsburgh Pirates combine to throw an 18-inning, six-hit shutout to defeat the Padres, 1–0, at San Diego Stadium in the second game of a twi-night doubleheader. Clay Kirby stars in a losing cause, hurling 13 scoreless frames for San Diego before leaving for a pinch hitter.
  - Left-hander Steve Carlton of the Philadelphia Phillies defeats the Houston Astros 3–1 at Veterans Stadium, evening his won–lost record at 6–6. Over the next 2½ months, he will win 15 consecutive decisions for a last-place team.
- June 14
  - By downing the Phillies 2–1 at Riverfront Stadium, the Cincinnati Reds extend their five-week hot streak to 26 wins in 32 games. At 34–19, they sit atop the National League West, 2½ games ahead of the Los Angeles Dodgers.
  - The 20–33 Phillies, meanwhile, trade veteran catcher Tim McCarver to the Montreal Expos for fellow receiver John Bateman. Tomorrow, Paul Owens, the Phils' newly appointed general manager, will make a four-player deal with the Atlanta Braves, sending pitcher Joe Hoerner and minor-league first baseman André Thornton to the Braves for pitchers Jim Nash and Gary Neibauer.
- June 18 – The U.S. Supreme Court rules 5–3 in favor of Major League Baseball in the lawsuit brought by Curt Flood, upholding the reserve clause.
- June 24 – In the first game of a doubleheader between the visiting Auburn Phillies and Geneva Senators of the Class A Short Season New York–Penn League, Bernice Gera becomes the first woman to umpire a professional baseball game. She quits between games after being verbally abused by some spectators and Auburn's manager.
- June 29 – Denny McLain is traded by the Oakland Athletics to the Atlanta Braves for veteran first baseman and future Hall of Famer Orlando Cepeda, 34. In McLain's final MLB season, the former 31-game-winner's record is 4–7 with a 6.37 ERA.

=== July ===
- July 2 – San Francisco's Willie McCovey hits his 14th career grand slam home run to pace the Giants' 9–3 win over the Los Angeles Dodgers. Pitcher Randy Moffitt wins his first major league game and receives a congratulatory telegram from sister Billie Jean King, who is playing at Wimbledon.
- July 4 – For the second time in his career, Tom Seaver of the New York Mets has a no-hitter broken up in the ninth. The bid is foiled in the first game of a doubleheader against the San Diego Padres at Shea Stadium by a Leron Lee single with one out, the only hit Seaver will allow in a 2–0 Met victory. Seaver had a bid for a perfect game broken up in the ninth against the Chicago Cubs in 1969.
- July 5 – The 36–34 Minnesota Twins change managers, replacing veteran skipper Bill Rigney with coach Frank Quilici. Rigney, 54, is in the midst of his 17th season as an MLB pilot. Quilici, 33, a former Twins' infielder, has never managed before.
- July 6 – At the Astrodome, the Pittsburgh Pirates score four runs in the top of the 17th inning to defeat Houston 7–3. The win enables the Pirates to extend their lead in the National League East to 2½ games over the New York Mets.
- July 8 – The California Angels go 16 innings to defeat the Boston Red Sox 4–3 at Anaheim Stadium. Syd O'Brien scores the winning run against his former team on a single by Sandy Alomar Sr.
- July 9
  - The Angels' Nolan Ryan strikes out 16 and allows only one hit (a first-inning single to Carl Yastrzemski) in a 3–0 victory over the Red Sox. It's Ryan's second career one-hitter; the first of his all-time-record seven no-hitters will happen on May 15, 1973.
  - Rich Reese of the Minnesota Twins ties a major league record by hitting the third pinch-hit grand slam home run of his MLB career.
- July 10
  - The Los Angeles Dodgers' Hoyt Wilhelm, 49, appears in his 1,070th and last game pitched in Major League Baseball, establishing a record that will last until 1998 and (as of 2024) is sixth all-time. The Dodgers release Wilhelm eleven days later.
  - Newly appointed general manager Paul Owens of the Philadelphia Phillies (26–50, last in the NL East) fires third-year manager Frank Lucchesi and takes the reins of the team himself for the rest of the 1972 campaign.

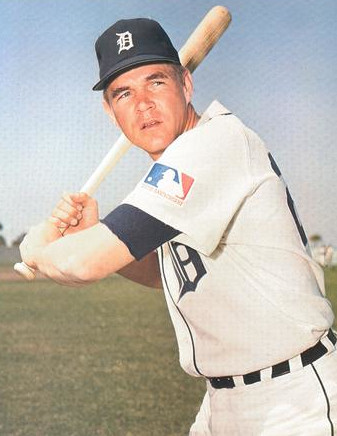
Mickey Stanley

- July 11
  - At Oakland, Marty Pattin of the Boston Red Sox has his no-hit bid foiled when Reggie Jackson singles with one out in the ninth inning. Boston wins 4–0. Jackson's Athletics, now 48–29, hold a 4½-game advantage over the second-place Chicago White Sox (44–34) in the AL West.
  - Mickey Stanley lashes a crucial, ninth-inning home run as the Detroit Tigers (42–34) beat the Texas Rangers 6–5 to stay on top in the AL East race, one game ahead of the three-time AL pennant-winning Baltimore Orioles (41–35).
  - In a battle of division leaders, the Cincinnati Reds (46–31) defeat the Pittsburgh Pirates (48–28) at Riverfront Stadium. The Reds lead the NL West by 1½ games over the Houston Astros (now 46–34), while the Pirates are 4½ games ahead of the New York Mets (44–33) in the NL East.
  - Billy Williams of the Chicago Cubs goes 8-for-8 in a doubleheader against the Astros at Wrigley Field, hitting home runs in both games and driving in four runs. The Cubs lose the first game 6–5, but win the nightcap 9–5.
- July 14 – In a game between the Detroit Tigers and Kansas City Royals at Municipal Stadium, Detroit catcher Tom Haller has his older brother Bill Haller looking right over his shoulder. It's the first time brothers have served as catcher and home plate umpire in the same MLB game. The Royals win 1–0.
- July 18 – Against the Philadelphia Phillies at San Diego Stadium, Padres' pitcher Steve Arlin has a no-hitter broken up with two out in the ninth by a Denny Doyle single. With two strikes on him, Doyle takes advantage of Padre manager Don Zimmer's decision to play third baseman Dave Roberts in by slapping a ground ball that bounces over Roberts' head—a ball that Roberts could have fielded at normal depth. Doyle later advances to second on a balk, then scores on a Tommy Hutton single. Arlin then retires Greg Luzinski on a fly ball to come away with a two-hitter (one of three he pitches within 30 days; he also hurls a one-hitter June 23, 1972, during a season in which he finishes 10–21, 3.60) in a 5–1 Padre victory. This will be the closest any San Diego hurler comes to a no-hitter until Joe Musgrove finally throws the franchise's first on April 8, 2021.
- July 20 – The Oakland Athletics reacquire two key veterans for the pennant drive and, potentially, the postseason: first baseman Don Mincher, 34, and utilityman Ted Kubiak, 30, from the Texas Rangers. In return, they send the Rangers infielders Vic Harris and Marty Martínez and southpaw Steve Lawson (PTBNL).
- July 24 – Leo Durocher, 66, steps down as manager of the Chicago Cubs (46–44 and tied for third in their division). He is replaced by Whitey Lockman, who played for Durocher's 1950s New York Giants and has been serving as the Cubs' director of player development.
- July 25 – At Atlanta Stadium, the National League wins the All-Star Game over the American League 4–3, behind hometown hero Hank Aaron's two-run home run and Joe Morgan's 10th-inning RBI single. Morgan is named MVP. It is the seventh time the classic has gone into extra innings.
- July 29 – In 17 innings, the San Diego Padres get past the division-leading Cincinnati Reds 4–3 at Riverfront Stadium on Jerry Morales' RBI single. The defeat shaves the Reds' lead to six games over the second-place Houston Astros in the National League West.
- July 31 – Minnesota Twins hurler Bert Blyleven gives up two inside-the-park home runs to Dick Allen of the Chicago White Sox. The next time this feat occurs in the major leagues, Blyleven's fortunes are reversed: he's the winning pitcher on October 4, 1986, when teammate Greg Gagne circles the bases twice against Floyd Bannister to help Minnesota defeat the White Sox, 7–3.

=== August ===
- August 1
  - At Atlanta–Fulton County Stadium, Nate Colbert of the San Diego Padres ties Stan Musial's 18-year record by hitting five home runs in a doubleheader against the Atlanta Braves. He hits two in the first game, won by the Padres 9–0, and three more in the nightcap, which San Diego also wins, 11–7. Musial had hit five home runs in a May 2, 1954 doubleheader at Busch Stadium—with Colbert, then eight years old, in attendance.
  - Cleon Jones delivers an RBI single in the home half of the 18th inning, and the New York Mets defeat the Philadelphia Phillies, 3–2.
- August 2
  - In an inter-league waiver deal that will have massive implications in the American League's late-season divisional pennant race, the Detroit Tigers claim 32-year-old left-hander Woodie Fryman from the Philadelphia Phillies. Over the next two months, as a member of Detroit's starting rotation, Fryman will win ten of 13 decisions, including the division clincher October 3.
  - César Cedeño hits for the cycle and knocks in four runs in the Houston Astros' 10–1 rout of the Cincinnati Reds.
- August 6 – The 47–57–1 Atlanta Braves, 16 games behind the Cincinnati Reds and fourth in the National League West, fire fifth-year manager Lum Harris. His replacement is all-time Braves great and future Hall of Famer Eddie Mathews, star third baseman during 15 seasons (1952–1966) spent in all three of the team's home cities.
- August 8 – In the Senior Circuit's longest game of 1972, the front-running Cincinnati Reds walk off with a 19-inning, 2–1 triumph over the visiting Los Angeles Dodgers. Joe Hague's pinch single is the winning blow, and Clay Carroll and Pedro Borbón throw nine innings of two-hit relief.
- August 10–11 – In 19 innings, the first-place Oakland Athletics defeat the second-place Chicago White Sox 5–3 on a two-run home run by Joe Rudi. The game, played at Oakland, begins at 7:30 p.m. PDT on August 10, but is halted by a 1 a.m. curfew in the 17th frame. When it resumes on Friday the 11th, it takes another two innings for a decision to be reached. Catfish Hunter gets the win in relief, then he starts the second game of Friday's twin bill, goes eight innings, and allows the game's only run in a 1–0 ChiSox victory. Oakland and Chicago remain one game apart in the AL West standings.

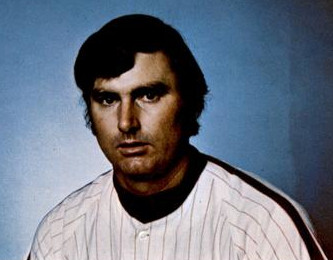
Steve Carlton

- August 17 – Steve Carlton of the Philadelphia Phillies wins his 15th consecutive game with a 9–4 victory over the Cincinnati Reds.
- August 18 – The Baltimore Orioles, one-half game from first place in the AL East, obtain two-time former NL batting champion Tommy Davis from the Chicago Cubs for catcher Elrod Hendricks.
- August 19 – Only recently recovered from arm miseries and plugged into the Boston Red Sox' starting rotation, Luis Tiant fires a two-hitter to defeat the Chicago White Sox 3–0 at Comiskey Park. It's the first of Tiant's four consecutive complete-game shutouts that will lift the fourth-place, 56–55 Red Sox into contention for the AL East title. Through the last seven weeks of the 1972 season, Tiant will go 11–2 with 11 complete games, six shutouts and a 1.20 earned run average.
- August 22
  - Nelson Briles of the Pittsburgh Pirates allows just one baserunner, on Ken Henderson's seventh-inning single, in a 1–0 triumph over the San Francisco Giants at Candlestick Park. Briles's near-perfecto is one of 15 complete-game one-hitters thrown in the majors during 1972.
  - Division-leading Oakland and Detroit tune up for their bitter 1972 ALCS battle by brawling at Tiger Stadium in the seventh frame of a 6–3 A's triumph. The fight is touched off when, with a runner on third, Detroit's Bill Slayback fires a wild pitch that sails behind the head of Oakland's Angel Mangual. When Slayback rushes to cover home plate while his catcher retrieves the baseball, he and Mangual start throwing punches. Umpire Jim Odom ejects the combatants, plus the Tigers' Ike Brown.
- August 25
  - The visiting Baltimore Orioles rally for three runs in the ninth inning to overcome the Oakland Athletics 5–3. The result affects both AL division races, as the Orioles climb into a first-place tie with the Detroit Tigers in the East and the Athletics fall a full game behind the Chicago White Sox in the West.
  - Managerial heads continue to roll during the season, as Harry Walker, skipper of the 67–54 Houston Astros, is relieved of his command. After coach Salty Parker handles the team on August 26, the Astros turn to Leo Durocher on the 27th, making him permanent field leader. The 67-year-old Durocher has spent only five weeks on the sidelines since his resignation from the Chicago Cubs on July 23. Houston is the fourth, and final, stop in a managerial career that began in 1939. The Astros are the eighth MLB team (out of 24) to change managers either immediately before or during the 1972 campaign, including the New York Mets' loss of skipper Gil Hodges to a fatal heart attack on April 2.
- August 27
  - Horace Clarke's sacrifice fly in the 16th inning delivers a doubleheader sweep for his New York Yankees over the Kansas City Royals in The Bronx, 7–6 and 9–8. The Yankees collect 40 hits on the day, including an MLB-high 26 safeties in the nightcap. The sweep ties the Bombers for third in the AL East with the Boston Red Sox, and both trail the pace-setting Detroit Tigers by 3½ games.
  - Adding depth to their roster for the stretch drive, the Oakland Athletics acquire former NL batting champion Matty Alou from the St. Louis Cardinals for fellow outfielder Bill Voss.
- August 29
  - At Busch Memorial Stadium, Jim Barr of the San Francisco Giants retires the first 20 St. Louis Cardinals he faces in today's 3–0 shutout victory. When added to the last 21 batters he retired in his previous outing—a two-hit, 8–0 blanking of the Pittsburgh Pirates on August 23 at Candlestick Park—Barr establishes a record for consecutive batters retired (41). His feat will be tied in 2007 by relief pitcher Bobby Jenks of the Chicago White Sox.
  - Bobby Murcer hits for the cycle and his New York Yankees outlast the Texas Rangers, 7–6, in 11 innings in the Bronx. Murcer's home run, his 23rd of 1972, had tied the game at six-all in the bottom of the ninth.
- August 31 – The Detroit Tigers make a huge addition to their postseason-eligible roster by acquiring 6 ft 7 in (2.01 m), 255 lb (116 kg) veteran slugger Frank Howard from the Texas Rangers.

=== September ===
- September 1 – As the season's final full month begins, the American League finds itself with two hot divisional races. In the East, only two games separate the top four teams—the Baltimore Orioles, Detroit Tigers, New York Yankees and Boston Red Sox. In the West, the Oakland Athletics lead the Chicago White Sox by 1½ games. In contrast, the National League races are all but decided, with the Pittsburgh Pirates and Cincinnati Reds in front of their divisional rivals by 11 and seven games respectively.
- September 2
  - At Wrigley Field, Chicago Cub pitcher Milt Pappas no-hits the San Diego Padres 8–0. Pappas retires the first 26 batters and comes to within one strike of a perfect game with a 2–2 count to pinch-hitter Larry Stahl, but home-plate umpire Bruce Froemming calls the next two pitches, both of which are close, balls. Undeterred, Pappas ends the game by retiring the next batter, ex-Cub Garry Jestadt. Not until Carlos Zambrano in 2008 would the Cubs be involved in a no-hitter (either in pitching it or having it pitched against them), and the next no-hitter at Wrigley won't come until Cole Hamels of the Philadelphia Phillies no-hits the Cubs in 2015. The perfect-game bid is also the only one, to date, to be broken up on a walk to the 27th batter.
  - The Boston Red Sox, sudden AL East contenders, purchase the contract of left-hander Bob Veale from the Pittsburgh Pirates. Veale, 36, a two-time former NL All-Star as a starting pitcher, becomes a highly effective reliever for the Bosox' bullpen.
- September 3 – At Yankee Stadium, southpaw knuckleballer Wilbur Wood tosses a five-hitter to shut out the New York Yankees 5–0 for his 23rd victory of the season (against 12 losses). But his Chicago White Sox fail to gain ground on the Oakland Athletics, who defeat the Detroit Tigers 3–1 behind Catfish Hunter's 18th triumph.
- September 7 – Boston Red Sox right-hander Sonny Siebert wins his 12th game and goes three-for-four at the plate (including a home run) to defeat the New York Yankees 10–4 at Fenway Park. The win propels the Red Sox to first place in the torrid American League East race.
- September 8 – Future Hall-of-Famer Ferguson Jenkins of the Chicago Cubs wins his 20th game for the sixth straight year, a 4–3 decision over the Philadelphia Phillies at Veterans Stadium.
- September 10 – In the 12th inning at Cleveland Stadium, rookie catcher Carlton Fisk's 20th home run of 1972 breaks a 1–1 tie and enables his Boston Red Sox to sweep a doubleheader from the Indians, 5–1 and 2–0. The Bosox' divisional lead is now 1½ games over the Baltimore Orioles.
- September 15 – Steve Carlton beats the Montreal Expos 5–3, raising his record to 24–9. The rest of the Philadelphia Phillies 1972 pitching staff has a combined record of 26–80.
- September 16 – José Cardenal belts two homers and drives in five runs, leading the Chicago Cubs to an 18–5 thrashing of the New York Mets at Wrigley Field. Chicago's 18 runs are the most scored by an NL team this season.
- September 17 – At County Stadium, the Detroit Tigers down the Milwaukee Brewers 6–2 behind Joe Coleman's 17th win. The Tigers' fifth victory in a row moves them into a virtual first-place tie with the Boston Red Sox.
- September 19 – At Metropolitan Stadium, César Tovar of the Minnesota Twins registers MLB's fourth "cycle" of the season, completed by a two-run, ninth-inning walk off home run to defeat the Texas Rangers, 5–3.

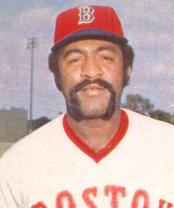
Luis Tiant

- September 20
  - The Boston Red Sox sweep a doubleheader from the Baltimore Orioles at Fenway Park 9–1 (behind Marty Pattin) and 4–0 (behind Luis Tiant). The visiting Detroit Tigers win their single game 4–1 over the Cleveland Indians behind Woodie Fryman. At day's end, Boston holds a one-game lead over the Tigers.
  - Milt Pappas of the Chicago Cubs wins his 200th game as a major leaguer, defeating the Expos 6–2 at Wrigley Field.
- September 21 – The defending world champion Pittsburgh Pirates (91–53) clinch the National League East title with a 6–2 victory over the New York Mets.
- September 22 – The Cincinnati Reds (90–55) clinch the NL West crown with a 4–3 road victory over the Houston Astros.
- September 24 – Luis Tiant throws another complete game victory to enable the Boston Red Sox to split their four-game weekend series at Fenway Park with the Detroit Tigers. The Red Sox remain one game ahead of the Tigers in the AL East. Meanwhile, the Chicago White Sox shave one game off the Oakland Athletics' AL West lead by defeating the Texas Rangers behind hard-throwing rookie relief pitcher Goose Gossage, who improves to 7–0 on the season, and Dick Allen's 37th home run. Oakland's lead is now 3½ games.
- September 28 – The White Sox' faint division-championship hopes are extinguished when the Oakland Athletics (90–60) sweep a three-games series from the Minnesota Twins at the Oakland Coliseum. They take the third and final game when light-hitting shortstop Dal Maxvill drives in the decisive run in the home half of the ninth. The White Sox, meanwhile, are idle after having lost back-to-back games on September 26–27 to the Kansas City Royals. At 83–65, they trail the Athletics by five games with only five to play, but are mathematically eliminated anyway because of the strike-driven, asymmetric 1972 MLB schedule.
- September 30
  - During the Pirates' 5–0 win over the New York Mets at Three Rivers Stadium, Roberto Clemente doubles off New York's Jon Matlack in the fourth inning to get his 3,000th and final regular-season hit in the major leagues.
  - Finishing his fourth year as manager of the Washington Senators/Texas Rangers franchise, Ted Williams announces his resignation, effective at the end of the season. The Baseball Hall of Famer will step down with a 273–364 (.429) record as the club's skipper. His 1972 Rangers, in their first season in the Dallas–Fort Worth metroplex, are in the midst of a 5–26 tailspin and end the strike-shortened campaign with 100 losses.

=== October ===
- October 1 – With only the Detroit Tigers and Boston Red Sox still alive for the American League East title, the Baltimore Orioles' Mike Cuellar spaces eight hits and Bobby Grich homers off Lynn McGlothen in the sixth inning to lead the Orioles to a 2–1 victory over the Red Sox at Memorial Stadium. It's a crucial setback for the Bosox, who now head into a three-game, season-ending series at Tiger Stadium with just a half-game lead. To win the division, Boston (84–68) must take two out of three games in Detroit from the Tigers (84–69).
- October 2
  - Detroit Tigers veteran left-hander Mickey Lolich, hero of the 1968 World Series, again comes up big in the clutch four years later, striking out 15 and defeating the Boston Red Sox 4–1 to give the Tigers a half-game lead in the AL East. The Bosox are victimized by a nightmarish mishap on the bases that befalls Luis Aparicio, their wily shortstop and normally a superior baserunner, in the third inning. Rounding third and poised to score the Red Sox' lead run on an extra-base hit by Carl Yastrzemski, Aparicio falls between third base and home plate. When he tries to retreat to third base, he finds Yastrzemski occupying the bag. Yaz is tagged out and the Bosox' rally is snuffed out.
  - In the first game of a doubleheader at Jarry Park, Bill Stoneman of the Montreal Expos no-hits the New York Mets 7–0. The no-hitter is 1) the second of Stoneman's career (the first having come on April 17, 1969—only nine games into the Expos' existence), 2) the first no-hitter ever pitched in a regular season game in Canada, and 3) the latest, calendar-wise, that a regular-season no-hitter has been pitched, tied with Addie Joss' perfect game in 1908.
- October 3
  - The Detroit Tigers clinch the American League East as Woodie Fryman beats Luis Tiant and the Boston Red Sox 3–1 for his tenth win. Detroit's Chuck Seelbach picks up his 14th save and Al Kaline singles in the winning run. It's Detroit pilot Billy Martin's second divisional championship in his three years as an MLB manager. When 85–70 Boston wins a meaningless final game October 4, the 86–70 Tigers' margin of victory is one-half game, an anomaly caused by the asymmetric 1972 schedule.
  - The Kansas City Royals fire manager Bob Lemon and replace him with their Triple-A skipper, Jack McKeon. It's the 41-year-old McKeon's first MLB managerial opportunity after over two decades as a minor-league catcher and pilot and MLB scout. He'll become well known as "Trader Jack" McKeon as a general manager and, at 72, win a World Series as skipper of the 2003 Florida Marlins.

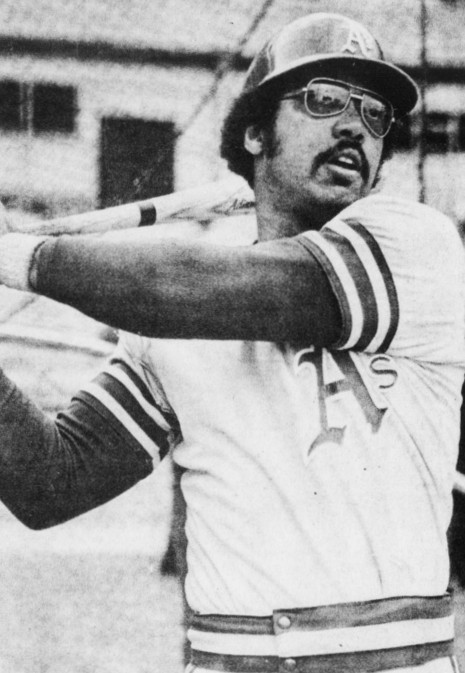
Reggie Jackson in 1973

- October 8 – The Oakland Athletics win Game 2 of the 1972 American League Championship Series 5–0 at the Oakland Coliseum behind Blue Moon Odom's complete game shutout to take a two-games-to-none lead over the Detroit Tigers. The contest turns ugly when Fred Scherman, a Tiger relief pitcher, throws two brushback pitches to Oakland slugger Reggie Jackson in the fifth inning; Jackson responds by belting a two-run double to drive home the Athletics' fourth and fifth runs of the day. Then, in the seventh, another Tiger reliever, Lerrin LaGrow, throws inside to Bert Campaneris, who is three for three with two runs scored, and hits the Oakland shortstop on the foot. Enraged, Campaneris fires his bat over LaGrow's head and charges the mound as the benches clear. Batter and pitcher are both ejected, and AL president Joe Cronin fines Campaneris and LaGrow and suspends them for the balance of the LCS. However, Cronin also rules that each player would be eligible to participate should his team move on to the World Series.
- October 11
  - The Pittsburgh Pirates carry a 3–2 lead into the bottom of the ninth of the fifth and deciding game of the NLCS at Riverfront Stadium. Leading off, the Reds' Johnny Bench homers to tie the game. His blast is followed by two singles and two outs. Then, with pinch runner George Foster at third base, the Pirates' Bob Moose unleashes a wild pitch, permitting the pennant-clinching run to score. The 4–3 triumph seals Cincinnati's sixth National League championship of the post-1901 era.
  - The California Angels fire manager Del Rice after only one season (75–80, fifth in the AL West) and replace him with Bobby Winkles, formerly the highly successful coach at Arizona State University (524–173 with three College World Series titles).
- October 12 – For the first time since divisional play began in 1969, both League Championship Series come down to a decisive Game 5, when the Oakland Athletics and Detroit Tigers resume their bitter ALCS struggle at Tiger Stadium. Detroit breaks the ice with an unearned run off Blue Moon Odom in the first inning. Then, in the second, Oakland's Reggie Jackson steals home to tie the game at one—but he pulls his hamstring in the process and is forced to leave the game. Two innings later, Oakland takes a 2–1 lead on an RBI single by Gene Tenace. Odom and left-hander Vida Blue (in a rare relief appearance) then shut down the Tigers for the rest of the afternoon. The Athletics win their tenth American League pennant, and their first since 1931 when the club was based in Philadelphia. However, Jackson's pulled hamstring will prevent him from appearing in the 1972 World Series.
- October 15 – Before Game 2 of the 1972 World Series at Riverfront Stadium, MLB marks the 25th anniversary of the racial integration of its playing ranks by honoring pioneer Jackie Robinson, who broke the color barrier in the National League on April 15, 1947, and Larry Doby, who integrated the American League that same year on July 5. In his remarks, Hall of Famer Robinson calls on baseball to open its managerial ranks to Black candidates as well. It will be the 53-year-old Robinson's last public appearance; seriously ill with diabetes and nearly blind, he will suffer a fatal heart attack at his Stamford, Connecticut home nine days later. (See Deaths entry for October 24.)
- October 22 – The Oakland Athletics win the World Series with a 3–2 victory in Game 7 over the Cincinnati Reds. Catfish Hunter gets the win in relief, and Rollie Fingers the save. Gene Tenace knocks in two of Oakland's three runs with a single in the first inning and a tie-breaking double in the sixth. Tenace, who had hit only five home runs during the regular season, slugs four in the Series and is named MVP. It's the Athletics' sixth world championship, and first in 42 years.
- October 24 – The notable playing careers of two National League infielders end today when the Pittsburgh Pirates unconditionally release second baseman, 1960 World Series hero and future Hall of Famer Bill Mazeroski, 36, and the Los Angeles Dodgers release shortstop, 1962 NL MVP and record-setting base-stealer Maury Wills, 40.
- October 25 – The Pirates make a consequential trade, obtaining left-hander Jim Rooker from the Kansas City Royals for reliever Gene Garber. Rooker, 30, will spend eight seasons as a Pirate, and win 82 games for them.
- October 31 – Jim Wilson, recently appointed general manager of the Milwaukee Brewers, follows in the footsteps of predecessor "Frantic" Frank Lane when he swings a high-profile, seven-player trade with the Philadelphia Phillies. The Brewers send pitchers Ken Brett, Jim Lonborg, Ken Sanders and Earl Stephenson to Philadelphia for pitcher Billy Champion, third baseman Don Money and utilityman John Vukovich. Money will become a four-time American League All-Star during his 11 seasons with the Brewers.

=== November ===
- November 2
  - Whitey Herzog, a future Baseball Hall of Fame manager, gets his first MLB assignment when he succeeds Ted Williams as pilot of the 54–100 Texas Rangers. Herzog, 41, has spent the previous five years as director of player development of the New York Mets.
  - The Mets send pitchers Danny Frisella and Gary Gentry to the Atlanta Braves for left-hander George Stone and three-time National League All-Star and 2x Gold Glove Award-winning second baseman Félix Millán. In 1973, Stone will go 12–3 (2.80 ERA), Millán will be named team MVP, and the Mets will win the second NL pennant in team history.
- November 7 – With general manager Paul Owens resuming full-time front-office duties, the Philadelphia Phillies appoint Danny Ozark their field manager for 1973. Ozark, 48, is a 30-year veteran of the Los Angeles Dodgers' organization and has spent eight years on Walter Alston's coaching staff. His tenure in Philadelphia will yield three National League East titles, but no NL pennants, before he's fired August 29, 1979.
- November 8 – The St. Louis Cardinals bring catcher Tim McCarver back to St. Louis, sending young outfielder Jorge Roque to the Montreal Expos in exchange.
- November 15 – Dick Allen of the Chicago White Sox is a landslide winner of the 1972 American League Most Valuable Player Award. An eight-year veteran of three NL teams, Allen has had a huge impact in his first year in the Junior Circuit—leading it in homers (37), runs batted in (113), bases on balls (99), OBP (.420), slugging percentage (.603), OPS (1.023), and OPS+ (.199).
- November 20 – Future Baseball Hall of Fame catcher Carlton Fisk of the Boston Red Sox (All-Star, Gold Glove Award, 22 HR, 61 RBI, .293) is the unanimous winner of the American League Rookie of the Year Award. The following day, New York Mets left-hander Jon Matlack (15–10, 2.32 ERA), wins 1972's NL "ROTY" honor, receiving 19 of 24 votes.
- November 21 – The world champion Oakland Athletics acquire centerfielder Bill North from the Chicago Cubs for relief pitcher Bob Locker. North will be a key part of Oakland's 1973 and 1974 teams that win American League pennants and World Series titles, and he will lead the AL twice in stolen bases.
- November 22 – Future Hall of Fame catcher Johnny Bench of the Cincinnati Reds wins his second National League MVP Award in three years. Bench beats out Chicago Cubs outfielder Billy Williams, who also ran second to Bench in the 1970 MVP balloting.
- November 24 – Former NL batting champion Matty Alou is traded by the Oakland Athletics to the New York Yankees for pitcher Rob Gardner and infielder Rich McKinney ("PTBNL"). Alou, 33, starred in the 1972 ALCS but went only 1-for-24 (.042) in seven games during Oakland's 1972 World Series triumph.
- November 25 – Pittsburgh Pirates right fielder Roberto Clemente wins his 12th consecutive Gold Glove Award and Los Angeles Dodgers first baseman Wes Parker his sixth in a row.
- November 27 – The New York Yankees acquire third baseman Graig Nettles, who will be a cornerstone of their 1977 and 1978 World Series championship teams—and a five-time American League All-Star and 2x Gold Glove Award-winner over 11 seasons in New York—when the Cleveland Indians swap Nettles and catcher Jerry Moses to the Yankees for catcher John Ellis, infielder Jerry Kenney, and outfielders Charlie Spikes and Rusty Torres.
- November 28 – In a blockbuster intrastate trade that satisfies both teams, the Los Angeles Dodgers send outfielder Frank Robinson, pitchers Bill Singer and Mike Strahler, and infielders Bobby Valentine and Billy Grabarkewitz to the California Angels for pitcher Andy Messersmith and third baseman Ken McMullen. In 1973, Robinson will hit .266 with 30 home runs with 97 RBI in 147 games, and Singer will combine with Nolan Ryan to strike out 674 batters, to set a 20th-century major league record for two pitching teammates. Messersmith will win 39 games in his next two seasons for the Dodgers and finish second in the 1974 NL Cy Young Award voting.
- November 29
  - The Chicago White Sox trade right-hander Tom Bradley, 25 and a two-time 15-game winner, to the San Francisco Giants for pitcher Steve Stone and outfielder Ken Henderson.
  - Relief pitcher Wayne Granger rejoins his original MLB team when the St. Louis Cardinals acquire him from the Minnesota Twins for left-hander John Cumberland and outfielder Larry Hisle.
- November 30
  - The Kansas City Royals obtain outfielder (and, soon, designated hitter) Hal McRae and pitcher Wayne Simpson from the Cincinnati Reds for pitcher Roger Nelson and outfielder Richie Scheinblum. A future four-time All-Star, McRae will play 15 years for the Royals and eventually become their manager.
  - In a six-player transaction, the Atlanta Braves trade slugging catcher Earl Williams and infielder Taylor Duncan to the Baltimore Orioles for pitchers Pat Dobson and Roric Harrison, catcher Johnny Oates and second baseman Davey Johnson. A multiple All-Star and Gold Glove Award-winner, Johnson will explode for 43 home runs in 1973, playing his home games at Atlanta–Fulton County Stadium, known as "the launching pad."
  - The Chicago Cubs deal three right-handed pitchers—former 20-game winner Bill Hands, Joe Decker, and prospect Bob Maneely—to the Minnesota Twins for southpaw hurler Dave LaRoche.
  - The Philadelphia Phillies make two inter-league trades. They acquire versatile veteran infielder/outfielder César Tovar from the Minnesota Twins for pitchers Ken Reynolds and Ken Sanders and outfielder Joe Lis; then, they obtain outfielder Del Unser and minor-league third baseman Terry Wedgewood from the Cleveland Indians for outfielders Oscar Gamble and Roger Freed.

=== December ===
- December 1 – After a flurry of deals to close November, a decidedly cooler December trade market opens with a single interleague transaction when the Cincinnati Reds send southpaw Jim Merritt, a former 20-game winner and National League All-Star, to the Texas Rangers for catcher Hal King and infielder Jim Driscoll.
- December 10 – The American League votes unanimously to adopt the designated hitter rule on a three-year experimental basis. The DH will replace the pitcher in the lineup unless otherwise noted before the start of the game. In the December 1975 meeting, the AL will vote to permanently adopt the DH. The National League declines to follow suit.
- December 18 – The Oakland Athletics unconditionally release future Hall of Famer Orlando Cepeda, 35. Hampered by a chronic left knee injury, Cepeda had appeared in just three July games for Oakland, all as a pinch hitter. But the former 11-time NL All-Star first baseman will prolong his career in the American League as a productive designated hitter in 1973.
- December 31 – Pittsburgh Pirates superstar right fielder Roberto Clemente, 38, and four other humanitarian workers die in a plane crash off the coast of Puerto Rico en route to delivering relief supplies to earthquake victims in Nicaragua. (See Deaths entry for this date below.)

== Births ==
=== January ===
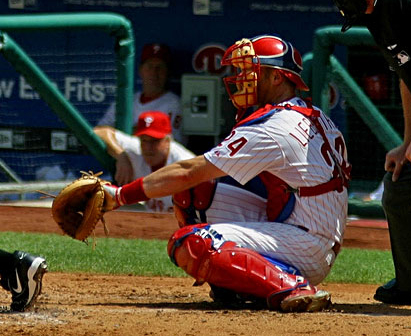
Mike Lieberthal

- January 1 – Rafael Roque
- January 2 – Garrett Stephenson
- January 9 – Jay Powell
- January 11 – Jermaine Allensworth
- January 12 – Rich Loiselle
- January 13 – Akinori Otsuka
- January 17 – Walt McKeel
- January 18
  - Keith Glauber
  - Mike Lieberthal
- January 20
  - Matt Beech
  - Tim Kubinski
- January 21 – Alan Benes
- January 25 – José Macías
- January 27 – Greg Martinez
- January 28
  - Steve Falteisek
  - Chris Peters
  - Tsuyoshi Shinjo
  - Bryan Ward
- January 29
  - Morgan Burkhart
  - Julio Mosquera

=== February ===
- February 1 – Rich Becker
- February 2
  - Jared Fernandez
  - Melvin Mora
- February 11 – Brian Daubach
- February 20 – Shane Spencer
- February 22 – John Halama
- February 23 – Rondell White

=== March ===
- March 1
  - Omar Daal
  - Jimmy Hurst
- March 3 – Mike Romano
- March 4
  - Bruce Aven
  - Mark Wegner
- March 10 – Rob Stanifer
- March 11 – Salomón Torres
- March 12 – George Arias
- March 20 – Jason McDonald
- March 22 – Cory Lidle
- March 24
  - José Cabrera
  - Steve Karsay
- March 25 – Howard Battle
- March 26 – Jason Maxwell
- March 27
  - Creighton Gubanich
  - Adam Melhuse
- March 29 – Alex Ochoa
- March 30 – Wilson Heredia

=== April ===
- April 3 – Steve Soderstrom
- April 4
  - Guillermo Garcia
  - Jeff Sparks
  - Matt Wagner
- April 6 – Marty Malloy
- April 10 – Shayne Bennett
- April 11
  - Robin Jennings
  - Bobby M. Jones
  - Jason Varitek
- April 12
  - Paul Lo Duca
  - Alfonso Márquez
- April 14 – Roberto Mejía
- April 15 – Ricky Otero
- April 16 – Antonio Alfonseca
- April 17 – Gary Bennett
- April 21 – Keith Williams
- April 24 – Chipper Jones
- April 25 – Micah Franklin
- April 26
  - Brian Anderson
  - Francisco Córdova
  - Felipe Lira
- April 27 – Chad Zerbe

=== May ===
- May 1
  - Bobby Chouinard
  - Fausto Cruz
- May 3 – Darren Dreifort
- May 4 – Manny Aybar
- May 10 – Marino Santana
- May 11 – Cam Cairncross
- May 18
  - Jaime Bluma
  - Mike Jerzembeck
- May 19 – Scott McClain
- May 24
  - Danny Bautista
  - Gabe González
- May 28
  - Tilson Brito
  - Joe Rosselli
- May 30
  - Scott Eyre
  - Manny Ramírez
- May 31 – Dave Roberts

=== June ===
- June 2
  - Raúl Ibañez
  - Chance Sanford
- June 3 – Bryan Rekar
- June 5 – Mike Coolbaugh
- June 6
  - Tony Graffanino
  - Brooks Kieschnick
  - Jeff Williams
- June 13 – Darrell May
- June 15
  - Tony Clark
  - Ramiro Mendoza
  - Andy Pettitte
- June 19 – Kazuhiro Wada
- June 20
  - Paul Bako
  - Juan Castro
- June 22 – Miguel del Toro
- June 25 – Carlos Delgado
- June 30
  - Garret Anderson
  - Jim Stoops

=== July ===
- July 5 – Bo Porter
- July 6 – Greg Norton
- July 11 – Mark Little
- July 12 – Kelly Wunsch
- July 13 – Clint Sodowsky
- July 15 – Wilson Delgado
- July 16 – Robbie Beckett
- July 19 – Brian Smith
- July 21 – Kimera Bartee
- July 24 – Shawn Wooten

=== August ===
- August 1 – Freddy García
- August 3 – Wendell Magee
- August 4 – Steve Bourgeois
- August 5 – John Wasdin
- August 6 – Duane Singleton
- August 7 – Kerry Lacy
- August 9
  - Dusty Allen
  - Jeff Zimmerman
- August 11 – Andrew Lorraine
- August 14 – David Manning
- August 15 – Chris Singleton
- August 17 – Jeff Abbott
- August 19 – Jed Hansen
- August 20 – Mike Porzio
- August 21 – Dean Crow
- August 22 – Steve Kline
- August 23 – Raul Casanova
- August 24
  - Mike Grzanich
  - Kurt Miller
  - Chris Prieto
- August 25
  - Andy Abad
  - Mike Welch
- August 28 – Jay Witasick
- August 30 – José Herrera

=== September ===
- September 1 – Kevin Orie
- September 2 – Pat Watkins
- September 4 – Darrell Einertson
- September 5 – Jimmy Haynes
- September 7
  - Jason Isringhausen
  - Willie Morales
- September 9
  - Mike Hampton
  - Félix Rodríguez
- September 13
  - Nelson Cruz
  - Chan Perry
- September 14 – David Bell
- September 16 – Brian Tollberg
- September 17 – Brady Raggio
- September 21
  - Scott Spiezio
  - Shannon Withem
- September 23 – Pep Harris
- September 26 – Fumiya Nishiguchi
- September 30
  - Curtis Goodwin
  - José Lima

=== October ===
- October 2
  - Rafael Carmona
  - Trey Moore
- October 4 – Adam Riggs
- October 5
  - Yamil Benítez
  - Aaron Guiel
- October 6
  - Valerio de los Santos
  - Benji Gil
- October 8 – Willie Adams
- October 9 – Steve Gibralter
- October 10
  - Mike Holtz
  - Ramón Martínez
- October 19
  - Keith Foulke
  - Joe McEwing
  - Marc Newfield
- October 23 – Giomar Guevara
- October 26 – Armando Almanza
- October 27 – Brad Radke
- October 29 – Richie Barker
- October 31 – Chris Clemons

=== November ===
- November 2 – Travis Miller
- November 3 – Armando Benítez
- November 6
  - Deivi Cruz
  - Matt Skrmetta
- November 7 – Travis Smith
- November 10
  - Shawn Green
- November 10
  - Greg LaRocca
- November 11 – Danny Rios
- November 12 – Homer Bush
- November 15 – Darwin Cubillán
- November 22
  - Luis Andújar
  - Jay Payton
- November 25 – Ramón Fermín
- November 28
  - Geraldo Guzmán
  - José Parra

=== December ===
- December 5
  - Cliff Floyd
  - Mike Mahoney
- December 6
  - Rick Short
  - Neil Weber
- December 7 – Chris Dale
- December 8 – Jolbert Cabrera
- December 11 – Frank Rodriguez
- December 14 – Marcus Jensen
- December 16 – Charles Gipson
- December 18 – Chris Seelbach
- December 21
  - LaTroy Hawkins
  - Dustin Hermanson
- December 25 – Erik Hiljus
- December 27 – Mike Busby
- December 28 – Einar Díaz
- December 29 – Jim Brower

== Deaths ==
=== January ===
- January 2 – Glenn Crawford, 58, outfielder for the St. Louis Cardinals and Philadelphia Phillies in the 1940s.
- January 15 – William Benswanger, 79, executive; son-in-law of Barney Dreyfuss who served as president and chief executive of the Pittsburgh Pirates from 1932 until the Dreyfuss family sold the team in August 1946.
- January 19 – Joe Goodrich, 78, third baseman who played for the Washington Potomacs of the Eastern Colored League in 1923 and 1924.
- January 21 – Dick Loftus, 70, outfielder for the Brooklyn Robins from 1924 to 1925, playing in 97 total games.
- January 23 – Fred Nicholson, 77, outfielder/pinch hitter who batted .311 over 303 career games for the 1917 Detroit Tigers, 1919–1920 Pittsburgh Pirates and 1921–1922 Boston Braves.

=== February ===
- February 2 – Dick Burrus, 74, first baseman and .291 lifetime hitter who played in 560 games for the 1919–1920 Philadelphia Athletics and 1925–1928 Boston Braves; made 200 hits in 1925.
- February 4 – Joe Green, 74, pinch hitter who had a single professional at bat for the Philadelphia Athletics, on July 2, 1924.
- February 6 – Frankie Zak, 49, shortstop and second baseman who played only 123 MLB games for wartime Pittsburgh Pirates (1944–1946), yet was selected to 1944 National League All-Star team.
- February 9 – Chico Ruiz, 33, Cuban-born infielder who played in 565 games between 1964 and 1971 for the Cincinnati Reds and California Angels; on Kansas City Royals' winter roster at the time of his death.
- February 12 – Jim Sullivan, 77, pitcher who hurled in 25 games for the Philadelphia Athletics (1921–1922) and Cleveland Indians (1923).
- February 15 – Pep Goodwin, 80, infielder for the 1914–1915 Kansas City Packers of the "outlaw" Federal League; served as president of the Pacific Coast League in 1955.
- February 17 – Lew Malone, 74, infielder in 133 games for the Philadelphia Athletics (1915–1916) and Brooklyn Robins (1917, 1919).
- February 22 – Johnnie Oden, 69, third baseman who played from 1927 through 1932, chiefly with the Birmingham Black Barons of the Negro National League.
- February 28 – Dizzy Trout, 56, two-time All-Star pitcher for the Detroit Tigers (1939–1952) who led the AL in wins in 1943 and was MVP runner-up the following year; also pitched briefly for Boston Red Sox and Baltimore Orioles, and was a member of the Tigers' broadcasting team.

=== March ===
- March 4 – Watty Clark, 69, left-handed hurler who won 111 games over a dozen seasons between 1924 and 1937 for three MLB clubs, most notably Brooklyn; led National League pitchers in games lost (19) in 1929 but went 20–12 (3.49) for a first-division 1932 Brooklyn club.
- March 6 – Stan Jok, 45, third baseman and pinch hitter in 12 games for the 1954 Philadelphia Phillies and 1954–1955 Chicago White Sox.
- March 10 – George Cunningham, 77, pitcher/outfielder who appeared in 162 career games, 123 of them on the mound, for the 1916–1919 Detroit Tigers.
- March 11 – Zack Wheat, 83, Hall of Fame left fielder who played 18 National League seasons (1909–1926) for Brooklyn; held the franchise's career records for games (2,322), hits (2,804), doubles (464) and triples (171); a lifetime .317 hitter who retired with the tenth-most hits in history; member of 1916 and 1920 NL champion Robins.
- March 12 – Dutch Levsen, 73, pitcher whose mediocre six-season career with 1923–1928 Cleveland Indians included one standout campaign: 1926, when he went 16–13 with 18 complete games.
- March 16 – Pie Traynor, 72, Hall of Fame third baseman for the Pittsburgh Pirates (1920–1935, 1937) who batted .320 lifetime and established a record for career games at third base; was named the best ever at his position in 1969; managed Pirates from June 19, 1934 through 1939.
- March 18 – Frank Bushey, 65, Boston Red Sox pitcher who worked in 12 career games during the 1927 and 1930 seasons.
- March 19 – Gordie Hinkle, 66, catcher who appeared in 27 games for the 1934 Red Sox; bullpen coach for the 1939 Detroit Tigers.
- March 24 – Dick Coffman, 65, pitcher who toiled in 472 games over 15 seasons between 1927 and 1945 for the Washington Senators, St. Louis Browns, New York Giants, Boston Bees and Philadelphia Phillies; with Giants, he became a relief pitcher who led the National League in games pitched (51) and saves (12) in 1938.
- March 28
  - Donie Bush, 84, shortstop of the Detroit Tigers for 14 seasons who led the American League in walks five times and was a superlative bunter; later managed Pittsburgh to the 1927 National League pennant; also skippered three other MLB clubs between 1923 and 1933, and became prominent as a minor league manager and executive.
  - Cy Moore, 67, pitcher who worked in 147 National League games between 1929 and 1934 for Brooklyn and Philadelphia.
- March 30 – Davy Jones, 91, outfielder for five clubs between 1901 and 1918, most notably the Detroit Tigers (1906–1912, 1918), where who organized a 1912 walkout to protest Ty Cobb's suspension for attacking a heckler.

=== April ===
- April 2 – Gil Hodges, 47, Baseball Hall of Fame, eight-time All-Star and three-time Gold Glove first baseman for the Brooklyn/Los Angeles Dodgers (1943 and 1947–1961); member of 1955 and 1959 world champions; drove in more runs than any other player during the 1950s; finished playing career with expansion New York Mets (1962–1963) and served as third full-time manager in the team's annals from 1968 until his death, leading the "Miracle Mets" to the 1969 World Series title; Mets retired uniform #14 to honor him after his passing; also managed the Washington Senators from May 23, 1963 through 1967.
- April 3 – Alvin Crowder, 73, pitcher who had three 20-win seasons with the Senators, winning 26 and 24 games (in 1932–1933) and St. Louis Browns; led American League hurlers in winning percentage in 1928; known for his mastery against the Yankees.
- April 7 – Larry Brown, 70, standout Negro leagues catcher, seven-time All-Star, and member of 1927 champion Chicago American Giants; played for five teams over 22 years between 1923 and 1947 and served as player-manager of the American Giants (1935) and Memphis Red Sox (1942–1943, 1945, 1947–1948).
- April 8 – Gus Fisher, 86, left-handed-hitting catcher who appeared in 74 games for the 1911 Cleveland Naps and 1912 New York Highlanders of the American League.
- April 9 – Roy Leslie, 77, first baseman in 160 career games during one-year stints for the 1917 Chicago Cubs, 1919 St. Louis Cardinals and 1922 Philadelphia Phillies.
- April 16 – Lou Perini, 68, construction magnate and club owner (1944–1962) who moved the struggling Braves from his home city of Boston to Milwaukee in March 1953, finding instant success on the field and at the turnstiles and kicking off a two-decade spasm of franchise relocations and expansion in MLB; his Boston/Milwaukee Braves won three NL pennants and the 1957 World Series.
- April 22 – Frank Drews, 55, second baseman who appeared in 95 total games for the wartime, 1944–1945 Boston Braves.

=== May ===
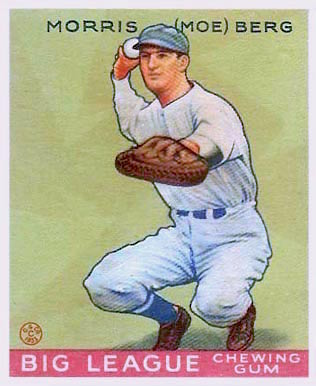
Moe Berg

- May 2 – Jack Smith, 76, outfielder who played all or part of 15 National League seasons (1915–1929) for the St. Louis Cardinals and Boston Braves, getting into 1,406 games.
- May 4 – Vic Sorrell, 71, pitcher who spent his entire 280-game career with the Detroit Tigers between 1928 and 1937; member of Tigers' 1935 World Series champs and 1934 AL pennant-winners.
- May 11
  - Lynn King, 64, back-up outfielder who played in 175 games for the St. Louis Cardinals in 1935, 1936 and 1938.
  - Danny Schell, 44, outfielder/pinch hitter who appeared in 94 games for the 1954–1955 Philadelphia Phillies.
  - Suds Sutherland, 78, pitcher, pinch hitter and outfielder in 17 games for 1921 Detroit Tigers; in 13 mound appearances, he posted a 6–2 won–lost record.
- May 15
  - John Milligan, 68, pitcher who played from 1928 through 1934 for the Philadelphia Phillies and Washington Senators.
  - Dixie Parker, 72, catcher and pinch hitter in four games for the 1923 Phillies.
- May 18 – Babe Barna, 57, outfielder who appeared in 207 career games for the Philadelphia Athletics, New York Giants and Boston Red Sox between 1937 and 1943.
- May 19 – Felix McLaurin, 50, outfielder who played in the Negro leagues from 1942 to 1946, chiefly for the Birmingham Black Barons and New York Black Yankees.
- May 20
  - Wally Dashiell, 70, shortstop who played one big-league game, on April 20, 1924, for the Chicago White Sox.
  - Hoge Workman, 72, pitcher for the 1924 Boston Red Sox, who also played and coached for Cleveland teams of the National Football League.
- May 22 – Dick Fowler, 51, Canadian pitcher who won 66 games with the Philadelphia Athletics over ten seasons between 1941 and 1952, including a no-hitter on September 9, 1945, at Shibe Park against the St. Louis Browns.
- May 24 – Bill Moore, 68, catcher for the 1927 Boston Red Sox.
- May 25 – Charlie Henry, 72, pitcher in the Negro leagues between 1924 and 1929.
- May 28
  - Al Gerheauser, 54, left-handed pitcher who worked in 149 career games for 1943–1944 Philadelphia Phillies, 1945–1946 Pittsburgh Pirates and 1948 St. Louis Browns.
  - Bob Hasty, 76, Philadelphia Athletics pitcher who appeared in 146 games in an MLB career that began on September 11, 1919 and ended on September 26, 1924.
- May 29 – Moe Berg, 70, catcher who served as a spy for the U.S. government during and after his playing career; played in 663 games for five MLB teams between 1923 and 1939, batting .243 lifetime.

=== June ===
- June 7 – Topper Rigney, 75, shortstop for the Detroit Tigers, Boston Red Sox and Washington Senators who appeared in 694 games and twice batted over .300.
- June 9 – Del Bissonette, 72, first baseman who twice batted .300 for the Brooklyn Robins and hit .305 lifetime in 604 games (1928–1931 and 1933); managed 1945 Boston Braves from July 31 through the end of the season.
- June 12 – Lefty Phillips, 53, manager of the California Angels from May 27, 1969, through 1971; previously pitching coach for the Los Angeles Dodgers (1965 to 1968) and a longtime scout.
- June 23 – Tom Long, 82, outfielder for the 1911–1912 Washington Senators and 1915–1917 St. Louis Cardinals; led National league in triples with 25 in 1915.
- June 24 – Crush Holloway, 75, outfielder and aggressive, hard-sliding baserunner who played in the Negro leagues between 1921 and 1939, notably for the Baltimore Black Sox and Atlanta Black Crackers.
- June 26 – Mike Kircher, 74, pitcher who made 14 appearances for the Philadelphia Athletics and St. Louis Cardinals from 1919 to 1921.

=== July ===
- July 2 – Rankin Johnson Sr., 84, pitcher in 72 total contests for the Boston Red Sox (1914), Chicago and Baltimore of the Federal League (1914 and 1915), and St. Louis Cardinals (1918); his son was an MLB pitcher and minor-league executive.
- July 3 – Leroy Herrmann, 66, pitcher who worked in 45 games for the Chicago Cubs (1932–1933 and 1935).
- July 11 – Johnnie Tyler, 65, outfielder in 16 career games for the 1934–1935 Boston Braves.
- July 17 – Al Spohrer, 68, catcher who played in 756 National League games—two for the 1928 New York Giants and 754 for the 1928–1935 Boston Braves.
- July 20 – José María Fernández, 76, Cuban catcher whose Negro leagues playing career, including barnstorming tours and independent circuits, extended for 29 seasons between 1916 and 1947; managed New York Cubans of the Negro National League from 1939 to 1948, including 1947 Negro World Series champions.
- July 21 – Harry McCurdy, 72, lefty-swinging backup catcher who appeared in 543 over ten seasons between 1922 and 1934 for four MLB clubs, batting .282 lifetime.
- July 31 – Rollie Hemsley, 65, catcher who played in 1,593 games for seven MLB teams between 1928 and 1947; five-time American League All-Star; later a coach and minor league manager.

=== August ===
- August 5 – Red McKee, 82, left-handed-hitting catcher who played in 189 games for the 1913–1916 Detroit Tigers.
- August 7 – Red Anderson, 60, pitcher who appeared in 36 games over three seasons for the Washington Senators (1937 and 1940–1941).
- August 13
  - Herman Besse, 60, southpaw twirler who went 5–15 with an ERA of 6.79 in 65 games for the Philadelphia Athletics (1940–1943, 1946).
  - George Weiss, 78, executive and cornerstone of the New York Yankees dynasty as farm director (1932–1947), then general manager (1947–1960), with the team winning 15 World Series titles over Weiss' 29 years; first team president of expansion New York Mets (1961–1966); named to Baseball Hall of Fame by Veterans Committee in 1971.
- August 14 – Bricktop Wright, 63, outfielder/first baseman who played in 22 games for 1943 New York Black Yankees of the Negro National League; played professional basketball in the 1930s and 1940s.
- August 15 – Jeff Pfeffer, 84, pitcher and 13-year (1911 and 1913–1924) MLB veteran who worked in 347 games for four teams, principally Brooklyn and St. Louis of the National League, won 158 games, and posted a 2.77 career ERA.
- August 16 – Fred Bailey, 77, outfielder and pinch hitter for the 1916–1918 Boston Braves who played in 60 career games.
- August 21 – Eddie Kenna, 74, catcher who appeared in 41 games for the 1928 Washington Senators.
- August 24 – J. Roy Stockton, 79, St. Louis sportswriter from the 1910s to the 1950s, also a sportscaster and author of books on baseball.
- August 25
  - Italo Chelini, 57, left-handed pitcher who made 24 appearances for the 1935–1937 Chicago White Sox.
  - Jack Crouch, 68, aptly named catcher who appeared in 43 big-league games for the St. Louis Browns and Cincinnati Reds between 1930 and 1933.
- August 26 – "Deacon Danny" MacFayden, 67, pitcher who worked in 465 games over 17 MLB seasons for the Boston Red Sox (1926–1932), New York Yankees (1932–1934), Boston Braves/Bees (1935–1939 and 1943), Pittsburgh Pirates (1940) and Washington Senators (1941); member of 1932 World Series champions.
- August 29 – Clem Hausmann, 53, pitcher for the Boston Red Sox and Philadelphia Athletics between 1944 and 1949.
- August 30 – Hank Miller, 55, two-time Negro National League All-Star who pitched in 89 games, 88 of them for the Philadelphia Stars, between 1938 and 1948.
- August 31 – Ivey Shiver, 65, outfielder who played in 21 MLB games as a member of the 1931 Detroit Tigers and 1934 Cincinnati Reds.

=== September ===
- September 2 – Jim Brillheart, 68, who pitched in 68 MLB games for the Washington Senators, Chicago Cubs and Boston Red Sox over four seasons between 1922 and 1931; longtime minor-league hurler who played in 29 pro seasons through 1951, and one of the few pitchers in baseball history to appear in over 1,000 career games.
- September 3 – Tom Fisher, 91, pitcher who dropped 16 of 22 decisions for the 1904 Boston Beaneaters of the National League.
- September 4 – Bob Bowman, 61, pitcher who compiled a 26–17 record and 3.82 ERA in 109 appearances with St. Louis Cardinals (1939–1940), New York Giants (1941) and Chicago Cubs (1942); gained notoriety by beaning newly acquired Joe Medwick of Brooklyn on June 18, 1940, sparking a bench-clearing brawl.
- September 6 – Charlie Berry, 69, American League catcher who played in 709 games over 11 seasons between 1925 and 1938; later an AL umpire from 1942 to 1962 who worked in five World Series and five All-Star Games; also played in the NFL and officiated numerous NFL championship games.
- September 9 – Will Jackman, 76, pitcher who at age 39 led the 1935 Negro National League in games pitched, complete games, and games lost.
- September 16 – Eddie Waitkus, 53, first baseman in 1,140 MLB games (1941, 1946–1955) for the Chicago Cubs, Philadelphia Phillies and Baltimore Orioles who was shot in 1949 by a teenaged female admirer who lured him to her hotel room; after his recovery, a key member of Phils' 1950 "Whiz Kids" pennant-winner; twice named to NL All-Star team.
- September 19 – Les Bartholomew, 69, left-handed pitcher in nine career games for 1928 Pittsburgh Pirates and 1932 Chicago White Sox.
- September 25 – Jerry Lynn, 56, second baseman for the 1937 Washington Senators; went two-for-three (.667) in his only big-league game.
- September 26 – Jesse Baker, 84, left-hander who worked in 22 games for the 1911 Chicago White Sox.

=== October ===
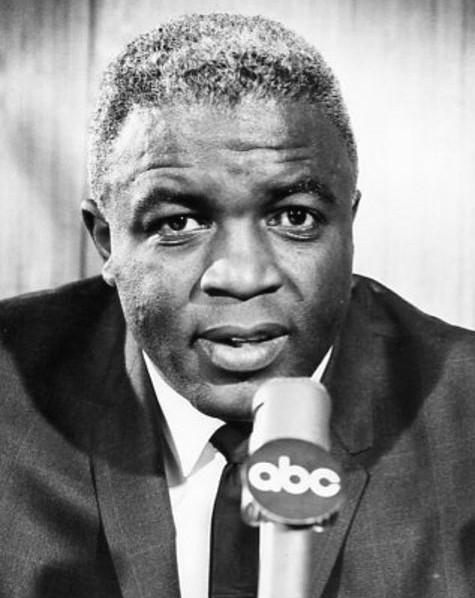
Jackie Robinson in 1965

- October 9 – Dave Bancroft, nicknamed "Beauty", 81, Hall of Fame shortstop for four NL teams, known for his defensive skill and also batting over .300 five times; captain of the New York Giants' pennant winners from 1921 to 1923, and World Series champion (1921–1922).
- October 11 – Danny Taylor, 71, outfielder who appeared in 674 career games for three MLB clubs, notably Brooklyn, over nine seasons between 1926 and 1936.
- October 17 – Johnny Rawlings, 80, shortstop for the 1921 New York Giants World Series champions and later a manager in the All-American Girls Professional Baseball League.
- October 19 – Butch Glass, 74, left-handed pitcher and occasional outfielder/first baseman who played for five Negro National League teams from 1923 to 1930.
- October 20 – Allen Russell, 72, pitcher in 345 games for the New York Yankees, Boston Red Sox and Washington Senators between 1915 and 1925 who led American League with nine saves in 1923; member of 1924 world champion Senators.
- October 22 – Elbert Williams, 65, pitcher who appeared in the Negro leagues between 1929 and 1935.
- October 24 – Jackie Robinson, 53, Hall of Fame second baseman for the Brooklyn Dodgers who broke Major League Baseball's color line in 1947 after beginning his professional career for the Kansas City Monarchs of the Negro American League; batted .311 in his ten-year National League career, leading the NL in batting average (.342) in 1949; also led his league in stolen bases in 1947 and 1949; 1947 Major League Rookie of the Year; 1949 NL Most Valuable Player; 1955 World Series champion; seven-time All-Star whose uniform #42 has been retired by every organized baseball team since 1997.
- October 25 – Stretch Miller, 62, St. Louis sportscaster who was a member of the Cardinals' radio team from 1950 to 1954.
- October 29 – Dutch Dietz, 60, pitcher in 106 games for Pittsburgh Pirates and Philadelphia Phillies between 1940 and 1943.

=== November ===
- November 2 – Freddy Parent, 96, shortstop for the Boston Americans (1901–1907) and Chicago White Sox (1908–1911); last surviving participant of the inaugural 1903 World Series.
- November 3 – Phil Voyles, 72, outfielder who appeared in 20 games for the 1929 Boston Braves.
- November 6 – Agustín Bejerano, 63, Cuban outfielder in the Negro leagues who played during the 1928 and 1929 seasons.
- November 8 – Harry Child, 67, relief pitcher who worked in five games for the 1930 Washington Senators.
- November 18 – Matthew Carlisle, 62, second baseman and shortstop who played in 395 Negro leagues games, 365 of them for the Homestead Grays; member of the 1943 Negro World Series champions.
- November 26
  - George Jackson, 90, outfielder who appeared in 152 games from 1911 to 1913 as a member of the Boston Rustlers/Braves of the National League.
  - Wendell Smith, 58, sportswriter for Pittsburgh and Chicago newspapers since 1937 who became the BBWAA's first black member and helped ease Jackie Robinson's entry into the major leagues; also a Chicago sportscaster since 1964.
- November 29 – Bernie Neis, 77, switch-hitting outfielder who played 677 career games for the Brooklyn Robins, Boston Braves, Cleveland Indians and Chicago White Sox between 1920 and 1927.

=== December ===
- December 2 – Rip Conway, 76, second baseman who appeared in 14 contests for the 1918 Boston Braves.
- December 4 – John Henry Russell, 74, All-Star second baseman in the Negro leagues who played between 1924 and 1934, chiefly for the St. Louis Stars and Memphis Red Sox.
- December 12 – Frog Holsey, 66, Negro leagues pitcher between 1928 and 1932, principally for the Chicago American Giants.
- December 17 – Fred Bankhead, 60, second baseman who played in 243 games over 12 seasons (1937–1948) for three Negro leagues teams, chiefly the Memphis Red Sox; one of five baseball-playing brothers, including Dan Bankhead.
- December 20 – Gabby Hartnett, 72, Hall of Fame catcher for the Chicago Cubs (1922–1940) who virtually clinched the 1938 pennant with his "Homer in the Gloamin'"; established career records for games and home runs as a catcher and was the NL's 1935 MVP; player-manager of Cubs from July 21, 1938 through 1940.
- December 23 – Dutch Jordan, 92, second baseman for the 1903–1904 Brooklyn Superbas.
- December 28 – Eddie Leishman, 62, longtime minor-league executive who served as first general manager of expansion San Diego Padres of the National League from 1968 until his death.
- December 30 – Pee Wee Butts, 53, five-time All-Star shortstop who played in the Negro leagues from 1938 to 1942 and 1944–1948, primarily for the Baltimore Elite Giants.
- December 31 – Roberto Clemente, 38, Pittsburgh Pirates' right fielder since 1955 and a national hero of Puerto Rico; a lifetime .317 hitter, 12-time All-Star and winner of 12 Gold Gloves who was a four-time batting champion and the NL's 1966 MVP; collected his 3,000th regular-season hit September 30; two-time (1960, 1971) World Series champion and 1971 World Series MVP; elected to Baseball Hall of Fame within weeks of his death, the first Latin American player so honored, and the Pirates retired his uniform #21.
