= Brunswick Pilots =

- 1913–1915; (1906, 1913–1915); Brunswick, Georgia

Minor league affiliations
- Class: Class D (1906, 1913–1915)
- League: Georgia State League (1906); Empire State League (1913); Georgia State League (1914); Florida–Alabama–Georgia League (1915)

Major league affiliations
- Team: None

Minor league titles
- League titles (0): None
- Conference titles (1): 1915
- Wild card berths (2): 1906; 1915

Team data
- Name: Brunswick (1906); Brunswick Pilots (1913–1915)
- Ballpark: Palmotto Park (1913–1915)

The Brunswick Pilots were a minor league baseball team based in Brunswick, Georgia. From 1913 to 1915, the Pilots played as members of the Class D level 1913 Empire State League, 1914 Georgia State League and 1915 Florida–Alabama–Georgia League. The Pilots hosted home minor league games at Palmotto Park. In 1906, Brunswick briefly hosted a team in the Georgia State League.

== History ==
In 1906, Brunswick briefly hosted a team in the Class D level Georgia State League. On June 25, 1906, the Columbus River Snipes moved to Brunswick with a record of 24–16. After compiling a 5–1 record while based in Brunswick, the Columbus River Snipes/Brunswick team ended the 1906 season with an overall record of 29–17, to place second in the standings. Dudley Lewis and Bill Hessler served as managers. In the playoff, the Waycross Machinists defeated Brunswick 3 games to 1.

In 1913, the Brunswick "Pilots" began play as members of the six–team Class D level Empire State League. The Americus Muckalees, Cordele Babies, Thomasville Hornets, Valdosta Millionaires and Waycross Blowhards joined Brunswick in beginning league play on May 1, 1913.

The Empire State League was finalized at a February 19, 1913 meeting held in Brunswick. At that meeting C. C. Vaughn, of Brunswick was selected as league president, Oscar Groover of Thomasville was elected vice president, and L.J. Leavy of Brunswick was elected as secretary/treasurer. Leavy was charged with gaining entry as a minor league through the National Association of Professional Baseball Leagues, which proved successful. Empire State League rosters were limited to twelve players, and no more than three of the players on the roster could have prior service with higher-classification minor league teams, meaning the Class C level or above. Team salaries were capped at $1,000 total for the season. Teams traveled by rail and there were no Sunday games.

The Brunswick use of the "Pilots" nickname derived from the local river pilots, who guided ships at the Port of Brunswick.

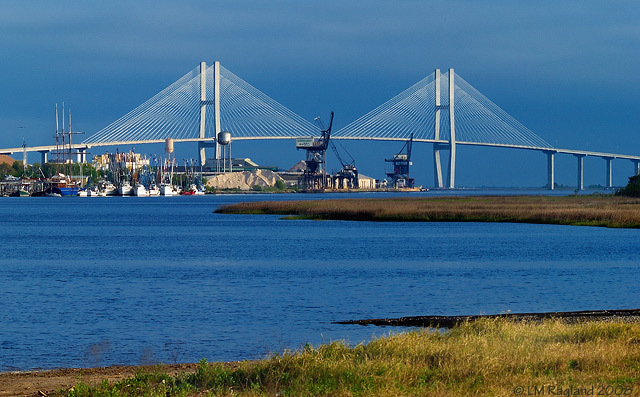
(2008) The Port of Brunswick and Sidney Lanier Bridge

In their first season of play, the Brunswick Pilots finished last in the Empire State League. In the first–half of the season, the Pilots had a six–game winless streak and two five–game winless streaks. The Pilots ended the 1913 season with a record of 42–57, placing sixth in the final Empire State League standings. With Bert Kite and Charlie Moran serving as managers, Brunswick finished 16.5 games behind the first place Valdosta Millionaires.

Continuing play in a new league, The Brunswick Pilots became members of the six–team Class D level Georgia State League, as the Empire State League changed names. The Pilots ended the 1914 season with a record of 53–51, placing fourth in the regular season standings. Bert Kite, Earl Bitting and Dutch Jordan served as managers, as the Pilots finished 5.5 games behind the 1st place Cordele Ramblers in the final standings.

In their final season, the Brunswick Pilots joined the six–team Class D level Florida–Alabama–Georgia League, as the Georgia League evolved. Brunswick ended the 1915 season with a record of 36–37, placing fourth overall, and winning the first half pennant. Wade Reynolds served as manager. In the finals, the Valdosta Millionaires were leading the Brunswick Pilots 2 games to 1, when the series ended due to a player strike. The Florida–Alabama–Georgia League folded following the season.

Brunswick next hosted minor league baseball when the 1951 Brunswick Pirates began play in the Class D level Georgia-Florida League, as an affiliate of the Pittsburgh Pirates.

== The ballpark ==
The Brunswick Pilots hosted minor league home games at Palmotto Park. The ballpark was located at Q Street & Ellis Street. Today, "Palmotto Square" is located on the same square block, still in use as a public park. The official address is 2718 Reynolds Street.

== Timeline ==
Year(s)	# Yrs.	Team	Level	League	Ballpark
1906	1	Brunswick	Class D	Georgia State League	Unknown
1913	1	Brunswick Pilots	Class D	Empire State League	Palmotto Park
1914	1	Brunswick Pilots	Class D	Georgia State League	Palmotto Park
1915	1	Brunswick Pilots	Class D	Florida–Alabama–Georgia League	Palmotto Park

== Year–by–year records ==
Year	Record	Finish	Manager	Playoffs/Notes
1906	29–17	2nd	Dudley Lewis / Bill Hessler	Columbus moved to Brunswick (24–16) June 25. Lost in Finals
1913	42–57	6th	Bert Kite / Charlie Moran	No playoffs held
1914	53–51	4th	Bert Kite / Earl Bitting / Dutch Jordan	Did not qualify
1915	36–37	4th	Wade Reynolds	Lost in 1st round

== Notable alumni ==
- Ed Foster (1906)
- Shovel Hodge (1914)
- Dutch Jordan (1914, MGR)
- Charlie Moran (1913, MGR)
- George Payne (1914)

== See also ==
- Brunswick Pilots players
