= Empire State League =

Empire State League (1913)
- Classification: Class D (1913)
- Sport: Minor League Baseball
- First season: 1913
- Folded: 1913
- Replaced by: Georgia State League
- President: C.C. Vaughn (1913); Oscar Grover (1913)
- No. of teams: 6
- Country: United States of America
- Most titles: 1 Valdosta Millionaires (1913)
- Related competitions: Empire State League (1987)

The Empire State League was a Minor league baseball circuit which operated in the 1913 season. It was a Class-D, six-team league, with teams based exclusively in Georgia, U.S. In 1914, the league evolved to become the Georgia State League.

== Cities represented ==
- Americus, Georgia: Americus Muckalees (1913)
- Brunswick, Georgia: Brunswick Pilots (1913)
- Cordele, Georgia: Cordele Babies (1913)
- Thomasville, Georgia: Thomasville Hornets (1913)
- Valdosta, Georgia: Valdosta Millionaires (1913)
- Waycross, Georgia: Waycross Blowhards (1913)

== Standings & statistics ==
Team	W	L	PCT	GB	Manager(s)
Valdosta Millionaires	58	40	.592	–	Whitey Morse / Dutch Jordan
Thomasville Hornets	56	40	.583	1	Martin Dudley / George Durley
Cordele Babies	49	50	.495	9½	Eddie Reagan
Americus Muckalees	45	54	.455	13½	Harry Weber / Hal Griffin; William Kuhlman
Waycross Blowhards	43	52	.453	13½	Charles Wahoo / Jack Hawkins / Willie Clark
Brunswick Pilots	42	57	.424	16½	Bert Kite / Charles Moran; Whitey Morse

Player statistics
Player	Team	Stat	Tot	Player	Team	Stat	Tot
Henry Chancey	Americus	BA	.383	Vincent Roth	Thomasville	W	18
Van Landingham	Valdosta	Runs	72	Red Dacey	Americus	PCT	.750 9-3
Henry Chancey	Americus	Hits	142				
Henry Chancey	Americus	HR	10				

== Notes ==
- In the best-of-seven series, second place Thomasville defeated first place Valdosta, four games to two.
- Henry Chancey (Americus) won the batting title (.383), while Vincent Roth (Thomasville) collected 18 wins and Red Dacey (Americus) posted the best W-L% (9-3, .750).
- In 1914, the Empire State League renamed itself Georgia State League.

== Players of note ==
- Willie Clark
- Dutch Jordan
- Charles Moran
- Harry Weber

== Sources ==
- Johnson, Lloyd; Wolff, Miles (1993). Encyclopedia of Minor League Baseball. Baseball America. ISBN 978-0-96-371898-3.
