= Joseph Gilmore =

Joseph Gilmore may refer to:

- Joseph A. Gilmore (1811–1867), governor of New Hampshire
- Joseph Michael Gilmore (1893–1962), American bishop
- Joseph V. Gilmore, American baseball player, coach, and athletic trainer
