= Joseph V. Gilmore =

American baseball player

Joseph V. Gilmore was an American baseball player, coach, and athletic trainer who played minor league baseball, coached the Boston University baseball team, and was the athletic trainer for the Boston Tigers of the Canadian–American Hockey League and the New York Americans of the National Hockey League.

== Baseball ==
In 1916, Gilmore, who was 20-years old and playing sandlot baseball in Boston, was signed by Philadelphia Athletics owner Connie Mack on the recommendation of scout Ira Thomas. He never made the major league club, instead playing for the Macon Peaches of the South Atlantic League and the Dothan club in the Dixie League. He later played for the Lowell Grays and Worcester Busters of the Eastern League and coached the House of David baseball team. From 1930 to 1932, he was head baseball coach at Boston University. He also served as the athletic trainer for all of B.U.'s athletic teams.

== Ice hockey ==
In 1928, Gilmore became the trainer of the Boston Tigers of the Canadian–American Hockey League. He also assisted Boston Bruins trainer Win Green when needed. He remained with the Tigers after the team was acquired by the Bruins and became known as the Cubs. In 1933, Gilmore was named coach and business manager of the Cubs. In January 1934, he was replaced by the recently retired Lionel Hitchman and returned to his former role of trainer. On February 22, 1935, Gilmore was seriously hurt in an automobile accident that killed one person. He was confined to bed for several months. In 1936, he was named trainer of the New York Americans of the National Hockey League. In May 1942, he became a civilian athletic instructor at Camp Edwards. He died on August 26, 1942, at the age of 48.
