= 1907 Atlanta Crackers season =

1907 Atlanta Crackers
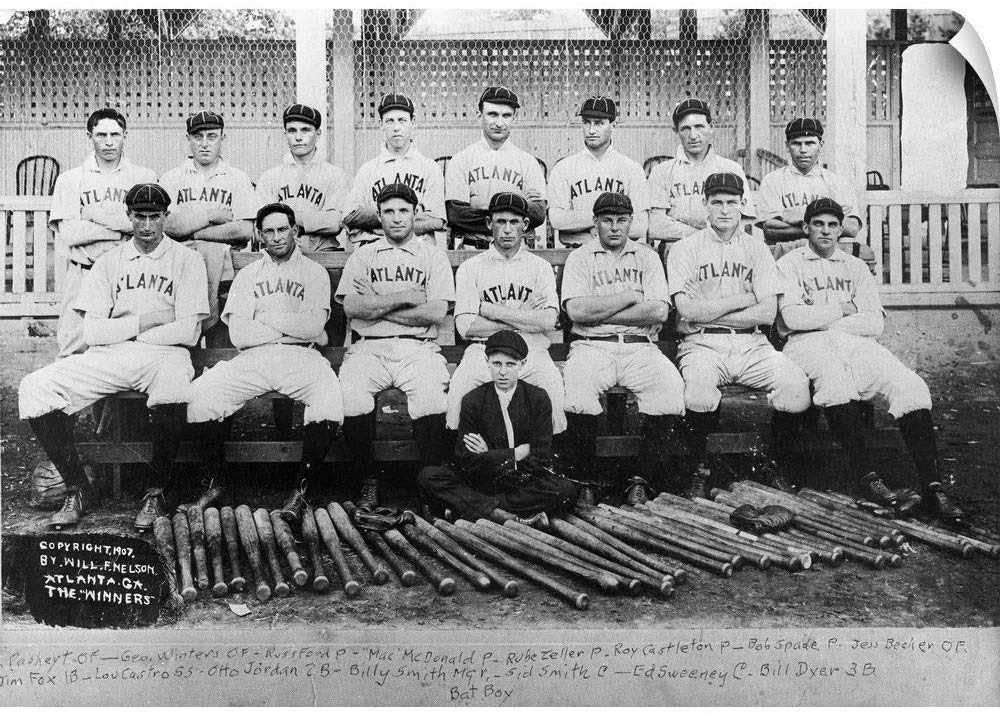
- Team photo by Will Nelson
- League: Southern Association
- Ballpark: Ponce de Leon Park
- City: Atlanta, Georgia
- Record: 78–54 (.591)
- League place: 1st
- Manager: Billy Smith

The 1907 Atlanta Crackers season represented the Atlanta Crackers baseball team in the Southern Association and won the team's first league pennant. The team was managed by Billy Smith.

This was the Crackers first season playing at Ponce de Leon Park. The team's road uniforms featured faint red lines.

Dode Paskert led the league with six home runs. The team also featured Roy Castleton, Lou Castro, Dutch Jordan, and Syd Smith.
