= Dixie League (1916 baseball) =

Dixie League 1916–1917
- Classification: Class D (1916–1917)
- Sport: Minor League Baseball
- First season: 1916
- Folded: July 4, 1917
- President: T. A. Ward (1916–1917)
- No. of teams: 7
- Country: United States of America
- Most titles: 1 Dolthan (1916); Moultrie Packers (1917)
- Related competitions: Dixie League (1933 baseball)

The Dixie League was a Class D level baseball league that played in the 1916 and 1917 seasons, with teams based in the US states of Alabama and Georgia.

== History ==
The Dixie League played a full season in 1916, with the Dolthan team winning the championship with a 38–22 record in the six–team league. In its second season, the league folded on July 4, 1917 with the Moultrie Packers in 1st place.

Sixteen years later, the Dixie League was reformed, with teams based in the western Gulf Coast states. It played in the 1933 season before splitting into two Class C level leagues, the East Dixie League and West Dixie League in 1934.

== Cities represented ==
- Bainbridge, GA: Bainbridge 1916–1917
- Dothan, AL: Dolthan 1916–1917
- Eufaula, AL: Eufaula 1916–1917
- Moultrie, GA: Moultrie Packers 1916–1917
- Quitman, GA: Quitman 1916–1917
- Tifton, GA: Tifton Tilters 1917
- Valdosta, GA: Valdosta Millionaires 1916

== Standings & statistics ==
=== 1916 Dixie League ===
schedule

Team standings	W	L	PCT	GB	Managers
Dolthan	38	22	.633	–	Jack Reidy
Eufaula	34	24	.586	3	J.B. Robinson
Bainbridge	31	29	.517	7	Fred Glass
Moultrie Packers	28	29	.491	8½	H.J. Wienges / Bob Schuyler
Valdosta Millionaires	25	34	.424	12½	Kuhlman
Quitman	20	38	.345	17	Jack Donaldson

No playoffs scheduled.

Player statistics
Player	Team	Stat	Tot	Player	Team	Stat	Tot
Fred Chambers	Dothan	BA	.348	Earl Moseley	Dothan	W	13
Jack Reidy	Dothan	Runs	56	R.J. Williamson	Quitman	SO	109
W.E. Barrow	Bainbridge	Hits	83	George Dickerson	Dothan	Pct	1.000; 11–0
Fred Chambers	Dothan	HR	9				

=== 1917 Dixie League ===
schedule

Team standings	W	L	PCT	GB	Managers
Moultrie Packers	36	20	.643	–	Bob Schuyler
Eufaula	31	23	.574	4	John Robinson
Bainbridge	32	25	.561	4½	Bill Foxworthy / Ed Foster
Dolthan	25	30	.455	10½	Jack Reidy / Frank Manush
Quitman	25	32	.439	11½	Jack Donaldson
Tifton Tifters	18	37	.327	17½	Doc Newton

League disbanded July 4.

Player statistics
Player	Team	Stat	Tot
Lance Richbourg	Dothan	BA	.345
Lance Richbourg	Dothan	Hits	78
L.C. Brinson	Eufaula	Runs	46
