= Tifton Tifters =

- 1917; Tifton, Georgia

Minor league affiliations
- Class: Class D (1917)
- League: Dixie League (1917)

Major league affiliations
- Team: None

Minor league titles
- League titles (0): None

Team data
- Name: Tifton Tifters (1917)
- Ballpark: Tifton Base Ball Park (1917)

The Tifton Tifters were a minor league baseball team based in Tifton, Georgia. In 1917, the Tifters played a shortened season as members of the six team, Class D level Dixie League, hosting home games at the Tifton Baseball Park. The tilters finished last in the league, which folded during the season. The Tilters were succeeded by the 1949 Tifton Blue Sox, who returned to minor league play as members of the Georgia State League.

== History ==
In 1917, minor league baseball began in Tifton, when the Tifton "Tifters" became members of the Class D level Dixie League, with the nickname reflecting the city of Tifton and its location in Tift County.

The Bainbridge, Dothan, Eufaula, Moultrie Packers, Quitman and Valdosta Millionaires teams joined the Tifters in beginning league play on May 6, 1917.

On July 5, 1917, the Tifters had a record of 18–37 when the Dixie League folded with Tifton in last place. Managed by player/manager Doc Newton, the Tifters ended the season in sixth place and finished 17.5 games behind the first place Moultrie Packers in the final standings. The Tilters finished behind the Moultrie (36–20), Eufaula (31–23), Bainbridge (32–25), Dolthan (25–30), and Quitman (25–32) teams in the 1917 league standings.

The Dixie League did not return to play in 1918. In 1949, minor league baseball returned to Tifton, when the Tifton Blue Sox began a tenure as members of the Class D level Georgia State League.

== The ballpark ==
The 1917 Tifton Tifters hosted minor league home games at the Tifton Base Ball Park. The ballpark had a capacity of 1,700 and was located at North College Avenue & North Ridge Avenue at West 4th Street, Tifton, Georgia. The site is still in use today with ballfields.

== Year–by–year records ==
Year	Record	Finish	Manager	Playoffs/Notes
1917	18–37	6th	Doc Newton	League disbanded July 5

== Notable alumni ==
- Guy Lacy (1917)
- Bobby LaMotte (1917)
- Doc Newton (1917, MGR)

== See also ==
- Tifton Tifters players
