= George Dickerson (baseball) =

American baseball player (1892–1938)

- Pitcher
- Born: December 1, 1892; Renner, Texas, U.S.
- Died: July 9, 1938 (aged 45); Los Angeles, California, U.S.
- Batted: Right Threw: Right

MLB debut
- August 2, 1917, for the Cleveland Indians

Last MLB appearance
- August 2, 1917, for the Cleveland Indians

MLB statistics
- Innings pitched: 1
- Earned run average: 0.00
- Stats at Baseball Reference

Teams
- Cleveland Indians (1917)

George Clark Dickerson (December 1, 1892 – July 9, 1938) was an American Major League Baseball pitcher who played for the Cleveland Indians in one game on August 2, 1917.

Dickerson was born in Renner, Texas, and began his professional baseball career in 1916 with Dothan, a class-D level team in the Dixie League. With Dothan, he won 14 games, and he was promoted later in the season to the Columbus Senators of the American Association. Dickerson played in ten games with the Senators and had a win-loss record of 3–2. After the 1916 minor league season concluded, the Cleveland Indians signed him to a professional contract.

Dickerson began the 1917 Cleveland Indians season, having drawn praise from Indians owner Jim Dunn. He ended up spending most of the season being sent to various minor league teams. After spending spring training with the Indians in New Orleans, he had stops in Milwaukee, New Orleans, Waco, and Butte, the last of which disbanded a week after Dickerson joined the team. Dickerson was brought up to the major league roster on August 2, and made his only major league appearance in a game against the Philadelphia Athletics. In the game, he pitched the final inning and did not allow an earned run in a 5–4 loss.

Two weeks after playing in his only major league game, Dickerson joined the military to fight in World War I, and was stationed in San Antonio. In early 1920, the Indians released him, citing that he had not sufficiently improved since they had signed him, and he did not play professional baseball after that. He died in Los Angeles at the age of 45.
