= 1972 Senior League World Series =

American youth baseball tournament

Tournament information
- Location: Gary, Indiana
- Dates: August 15–20, 1972

Final positions
- Champions: Pingtung, Taiwan
- Runner-up: Oxnard, California

The 1972 Senior League World Series was a baseball tournament for children aged 13 to 16 years old. It took place from August 15–20 in Gary, Indiana, United States. Pingtung, Taiwan defeated Oxnard, California in the championship game.

This year featured the debut of the Far East Region.

== Teams ==
United States	International
(Indiana) South Bend, Indiana Host	Windsor, Ontario Canada
(Pennsylvania) Council Rock, Pennsylvania East	(West Germany) West Germany Europe
(Illinois) Lincolnwood, Illinois North	(Taiwan) Pingtung, Taiwan Far East
(Florida) Temple Terrace, Florida South	Matamoros, Mexico Mexico
(California) Oxnard, California West	Humacao, Puerto Rico Puerto Rico

== Results ==
Opening Round

—
—	Indiana	2
—	Florida	1

—
—	Puerto Rico	3
—	California	2

Winner's Bracket

—
1–0	Indiana	7
1–0	Puerto Rico	6
—	Illinois	7
—	West Germany	2
—	Taiwan	1
—	Pennsylvania	0
—	Mexico	5
—	Canada	0

—
2–0	Indiana	1
1–0	Illinois	2
1–0	Taiwan	9
1–0	Mexico	1

Bracket Final
2–0	Illinois	1
2–0	Taiwan	12

Loser's Bracket

—
0–1	Florida	0
0–1	California	3

—
0–1	Pennsylvania	2
0–1	Canada	0
0–1	West Germany	1
1–1	California	8

—
1–1	Puerto Rico	0
1–1	Pennsylvania	7
1–1	Mexico	2
2–1	California (F/8)	3

—
2–1	Illinois	5
2–1	Pennsylvania (F/10)	6
2–1	Indiana	3
3–1	California	6

Bracket Final
3–1	Pennsylvania	2
4–1	California	3

Elimination Round

Semifinals
2–0	Illinois	1
2–0	Taiwan	12
4–1	California	3
3–1	Pennsylvania	2

Championship
3–0	Taiwan	9
5–1	California	0

1972 Senior League World Series Champions
Pingtung, Taiwan
