= Joe Goodrich =

American baseball player

- Third baseman
- Born: November 17, 1893; San Antonio, Texas, U.S.
- Died: January 19, 1972 (aged 78); Austin, Texas, U.S.
- Batted: Right Threw: Right

Negro league baseball debut
- 1923, for the Washington Potomacs

Last appearance
- 1924, for the Washington Potomacs
- Stats at Baseball Reference

Teams
- Washington Potomacs (1923–1924)

Joseph Henry Goodrich (November 17, 1893 – January 19, 1972) was an American Negro league third baseman in the 1920s.

A native of San Antonio, Texas, Goodrich made his Negro leagues debut in 1923 with the Washington Potomacs. He played for Washington again in 1924, his final professional season. Goodrich died in Austin, Texas in 1972 at age 78.
