= Elbert Williams (baseball) =

- Pitcher
- Batted: Unknown Threw: Right

Negro league baseball debut
- 1929, for the Havana Red Sox

Last appearance
- 1935, for the Brooklyn Eagles

Teams
- Havana Red Sox (1929); Homestead Grays (1929); Detroit Stars (1931); Louisville White Sox (1931); Monroe Monarchs (1932); Brooklyn Eagles (1935)

Elbert Williams was an American professional baseball pitcher in the Negro leagues. He played with several teams from 1929 to 1935.

Williams was discovered by Ramiro Ramírez and signed by the Havana Red Sox owner Syd Pollock for the 1929 season.
