= Earl Moseley =

American baseball player (1887–1963)

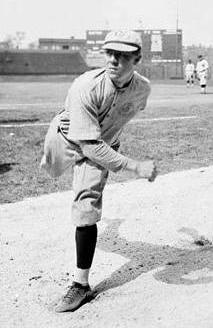
- Pitcher
- Born: September 7, 1887; Middleburg Heights, Ohio, U.S.
- Died: July 1, 1963 (aged 75); Alliance, Ohio, U.S.
- Batted: Right Threw: Right

MLB debut
- June 17, 1913, for the Boston Red Sox

Last MLB appearance
- September 25, 1916, for the Cincinnati Reds

MLB statistics
- Win–loss record: 49-48
- Earned run average: 3.01
- Strikeouts: 469
- Stats at Baseball Reference

Teams
- Boston Red Sox (1913); Indianapolis Hoosiers (1914); Newark Pepper (1915); Cincinnati Reds (1916)

Career highlights and awards
- Federal League pennant: 1914; Federal League ERA champion: 1915

Earl Victor Moseley (September 7, 1887 – July 1, 1963) was an American pitcher who played for the Boston Red Sox (1913), Indianapolis Hoosiers / Newark Pepper (1914–1915) and Cincinnati Reds (1916). Moseley batted and threw right-handed. He was born in Middleburg Heights, Ohio.

Moseley made his majors debut in 1913 with the Boston Red Sox and went 8–5. The next year, he jumped to the Federal League and won 19 and 15 in two seasons for the Indianapolis/Newark franchises, leading the league with a 1.91 earned run average in 1915 over Eddie Plank (2.08) and Mordecai Brown (2.09). Bothered by arm problems, he played his final season with the Cincinnati Reds in 1916.

In a four-season career, Moseley posted a 49–48 record with a 3.01 ERA and 469 strikeouts in 855-2/3 innings pitched. Moseley died in Alliance, Ohio, at the age of 75.

== See also ==
- List of Major League Baseball annual ERA leaders
