= Frank Manush =

American baseball player (1883-1965)

- Third baseman
- Born: September 18, 1883; Tuscumbia, Alabama, U.S.
- Died: January 5, 1965 (aged 81); Laguna Beach, California, U.S.
- Batted: Right Threw: Right

MLB debut
- August 31, 1908, for the Philadelphia Athletics

Last MLB appearance
- October 2, 1908, for the Philadelphia Athletics

MLB statistics
- Batting average: .156
- Home runs: 0
- Runs batted in: 0
- Stats at Baseball Reference

Teams
- Philadelphia Athletics (1908)

Frank Henry Benjamin Manush (September 18, 1883 – January 5, 1965) was an American Major League Baseball third baseman. Manush played for the Philadelphia Athletics in 1908. In 23 career games, he had 12 hits in 77 at-bats, with a .156 batting average. He batted and threw right-handed. Frank was the brother of Baseball Hall of Famer, Heinie Manush.

He was the manager of the Minor League Baseball team, the Albany Babies, in 1914 and 1915.

Manush was born in Tuscumbia, Alabama, and died in Laguna Beach, California.

Manush served as the head coach of Trinity College (now Duke University) in Durham, N.C., during the 1917 season. He finished with a 4-6-1 record.
