= Valdosta Millionaires =

- 1906–1916; (1906, 1913–1916); Valdosta, Georgia

Minor league affiliations
- Previous classes: Class D
- League: Dixie League (1916)
- Previous leagues: Florida–Alabama–Georgia League (1915); Georgia State League (1914); Empire State League (1913); Georgia State League (1906)

Minor league titles
- Conference titles: 1 (1913)

Team data
- Previous names: Valdosta Millionaires (1913–1916); Valdosta Stars (1906)

The Valdosta Millionaires were a minor league baseball team, based in Valdosta, Georgia from 1913 until 1916. However, the team's roots can be traced back to 1906 as the Valdosta Stars of the Georgia State League. The Millionaires became Valdosta's representative in the Empire State League, when it resumed operations in 1913. The Millionaires claimed first place in the league that season winning the league pennant. In the playoff, the second place Thomasville Hornets defeated Valdosta, four games to two, in the best-of-seven series.

In 1914, the league renamed itself the Georgia State League, with the Millionaires representing Valdosta. The circuit started 1915 as the Georgia State League, however it was renamed the Florida–Alabama–Georgia League, which operated inside of Florida, on June 15. In 1916 the team moved to the Dixie League and posted a 25–34 record. After the season ended, the team disbanded.

== Year-by-year records ==
Year	Record	Finish	Manager	Playoffs/Notes
1906	22-25	4th	A.L. Starr / Harry Piepho; Peck Walters / E. Bagwell	Team disbanded July 4
1913	58-40	1st	Whitey Morse / Dutch Jordan	Won league pennant Lost playoffs to Thomasville Hornets 4 games to 2.
1914	41-69	6th	Joe Herold / Frank Moffett	No playoffs held
1916	25-34	5th	Bill Kuhlmann	No playoffs held
