= Waycross Moguls =

- 1906–1915; (1906, 1913–1915); Waycross, Georgia

Minor league affiliations
- Previous classes: Class D
- League: Florida–Alabama–Georgia League (1915)
- Previous leagues: Georgia State League (1914); Empire State League (1913); Georgia State League (1912)

Team data
- Previous names: Waycross Moguls (1914–1915); Waycross Grasshoppers (1914); Waycross Blowhards (1913); Waycross Machinists (1906)

The Waycross Moguls were a minor league baseball team, based in Waycross, Georgia as a representative of the Florida–Alabama–Georgia League in 1915. However the team originated in 1906 as the Waycross Machinists of the Georgia State League for one season. Waycross' minor league baseball team was then revived in 1913 as the Waycross Blowhards of the Empire State League. In 1914 they were known as the Waycross Grasshoppers before changing their name to the Moguls during the season.
