= Dutch Jordan =

American baseball player (1880-1972)

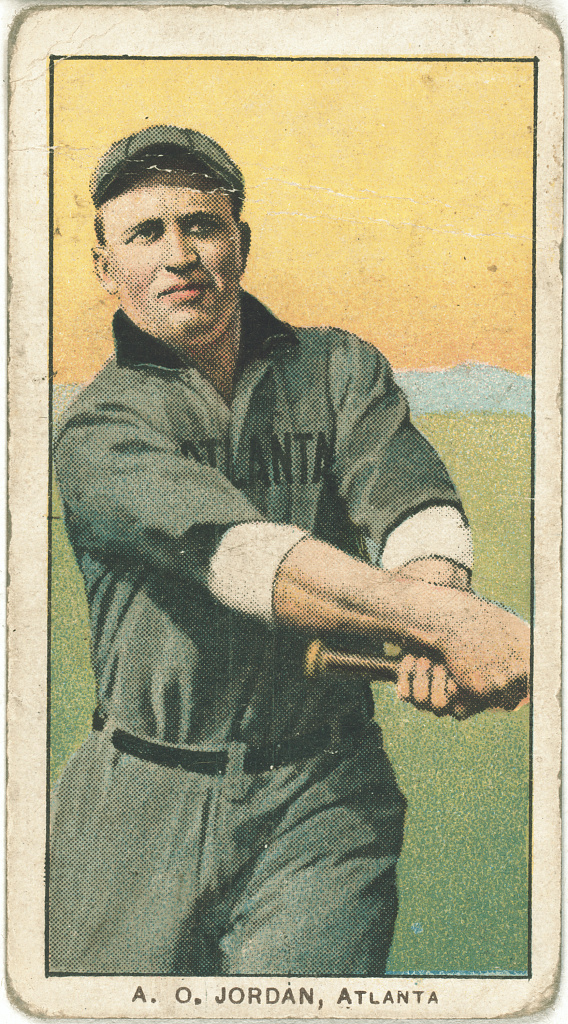
- Second baseman
- Born: January 5, 1880; Pittsburgh, Pennsylvania, U.S.
- Died: December 23, 1972 (aged 92); West Allegheny, Pennsylvania, U.S.
- Batted: Right Threw: Right

MLB debut
- April 25, 1903, for the Brooklyn Superbas

Last MLB appearance
- October 8, 1904, for the Brooklyn Superbas

MLB statistics
- Batting average: .208
- Home runs: 0
- Runs batted in: 40
- Stats at Baseball Reference

Teams
- Brooklyn Superbas (1903–1904)

Adolf Otto Jordan (January 5, 1880 in Pittsburgh, Pennsylvania – December 23, 1972 in West Allegheny, Pennsylvania), was an American former professional baseball player who played second base for the Brooklyn Superbas during the 1903 and 1904 baseball seasons.
