= 1940 Philadelphia Athletics season =

1940 Philadelphia Athletics
- League: American League
- Ballpark: Shibe Park
- City: Philadelphia
- Record: 54–100 (.351)
- League place: 8th
- Owners: Connie Mack
- Managers: Connie Mack
- Radio: WIP (By Saam, Stoney McLinn); WCAU (Bill Dyer, Harry McTigue)

The 1940 Philadelphia Athletics season involved the A's finishing eighth in the American League with a record of 54 wins and 100 losses.

== Offseason ==
- December 8, 1939: Al Simmons was signed as a free agent by the Athletics.

== Regular season ==
=== Season standings ===
American League
| Team | W | L | Pct. | GB | Home | Road |
|---|---|---|---|---|---|---|
| Detroit Tigers | 90 | 64 | .584 | — | 50‍–‍29 | 40‍–‍35 |
| Cleveland Indians | 89 | 65 | .578 | 1 | 51‍–‍30 | 38‍–‍35 |
| New York Yankees | 88 | 66 | .571 | 2 | 52‍–‍24 | 36‍–‍42 |
| Boston Red Sox | 82 | 72 | .532 | 8 | 45‍–‍34 | 37‍–‍38 |
| Chicago White Sox | 82 | 72 | .532 | 8 | 41‍–‍36 | 41‍–‍36 |
| St. Louis Browns | 67 | 87 | .435 | 23 | 37‍–‍39 | 30‍–‍48 |
| Washington Senators | 64 | 90 | .416 | 26 | 36‍–‍41 | 28‍–‍49 |
| Philadelphia Athletics | 54 | 100 | .351 | 36 | 29‍–‍42 | 25‍–‍58 |

=== Record vs. opponents ===
1940 American League record Sources:
| Team | BOS | CWS | CLE | DET | NYY | PHA | SLB | WSH |
|---|---|---|---|---|---|---|---|---|
| Boston | — | 11–11 | 8–14 | 11–11 | 9–13 | 18–4 | 12–10 | 13–9 |
| Chicago | 11–11 | — | 6–16 | 13–9 | 11–11–1 | 16–6 | 13–9 | 12–10 |
| Cleveland | 14–8 | 16–6 | — | 11–11 | 10–12 | 14–8 | 11–11–1 | 13–9 |
| Detroit | 11–11 | 9–13 | 11–11 | — | 14–8 | 11–11 | 18–4–1 | 16–6 |
| New York | 13–9 | 11–11–1 | 12–10 | 8–14 | — | 13–9 | 14–8 | 17–5 |
| Philadelphia | 4–18 | 6–16 | 8–14 | 11–11 | 9–13 | — | 8–14 | 8–14 |
| St. Louis | 10–12 | 9–13 | 11–11–1 | 4–18–1 | 8–14 | 14–8 | — | 11–11 |
| Washington | 9–13 | 10–12 | 9–13 | 6–16 | 5–17 | 14–8 | 11–11 | — |

=== Roster ===
1940 Philadelphia Athletics
Roster
| Pitchers: 30 Johnny Babich; 35 Bill Beckmann; 20 Herman Besse; 16 George Caster; 19 Chubby Dean; 21 Ed Heusser; 23 Phil Marchildon; 31 Les McCrabb; 33 Pat McLaughlin; 14 Carl Miles; 24 Nels Potter; 17 Buck Ross; 22 Porter Vaughan | Catchers: 9 Earle Brucker; 22,39 Buddy Hancken; 8 Frankie Hayes; 26 Hal Wagner; Infielders: 18 Al Brancato; 25 Fred Chapman; 7 Crash Davis; 12 Joe Gantenbein; 3 Bill Lillard; 2 Benny McCoy; 34 Al Rubeling; 5 Dick Siebert; 41 Jack Wallaesa | Outfielders: 10 Sam Chapman; 4 Bob Johnson; 11 Dee Miles; 1 Wally Moses; 6 Al Simmons; 40 Eric Tipton; 38 Elmer Valo; Other batters: 37 Dario Lodigiani | Manager: Connie Mack; Coaches: 29 Charlie Berry; 28 Lena Blackburne; 32 Dave Keefe; 27 Earle Mack |

== Player stats ==
=== Batting ===
==== Starters by position ====
Note: Pos = Position; G = Games played; AB = At bats; H = Hits; Avg. = Batting average; HR = Home runs; RBI = Runs batted in

| Pos | Player | G | AB | H | Avg. | HR | RBI |
|---|---|---|---|---|---|---|---|
| C | Frankie Hayes | 136 | 465 | 143 | .308 | 16 | 70 |
| 1B | Dick Siebert | 154 | 595 | 170 | .286 | 5 | 77 |
| 2B | Benny McCoy | 134 | 490 | 126 | .257 | 7 | 62 |
| SS | Al Brancato | 107 | 298 | 57 | .191 | 1 | 23 |
| 3B | Al Rubeling | 108 | 376 | 92 | .245 | 4 | 38 |
| OF | Wally Moses | 142 | 537 | 166 | .309 | 9 | 50 |
| OF | Bob Johnson | 138 | 512 | 137 | .268 | 31 | 103 |
| OF | Sam Chapman | 134 | 508 | 140 | .276 | 23 | 75 |

==== Other batters ====
Note: G = Games played; AB = At bats; H = Hits; Avg. = Batting average; HR = Home runs; RBI = Runs batted in

| Player | G | AB | H | Avg. | HR | RBI |
|---|---|---|---|---|---|---|
| Dee Miles | 88 | 236 | 71 | .301 | 1 | 23 |
| Bill Lillard | 73 | 206 | 49 | .238 | 1 | 21 |
| Joe Gantenbein | 75 | 197 | 47 | .239 | 4 | 23 |
| Al Simmons | 37 | 81 | 25 | .309 | 1 | 19 |
| Hal Wagner | 34 | 75 | 19 | .253 | 0 | 10 |
| Fred Chapman | 26 | 69 | 11 | .159 | 0 | 4 |
| Crash Davis | 73 | 67 | 18 | .269 | 0 | 9 |
| Earle Brucker | 23 | 46 | 9 | .196 | 0 | 2 |
| Elmer Valo | 6 | 23 | 8 | .348 | 0 | 0 |
| Jack Wallaesa | 6 | 20 | 3 | .150 | 0 | 2 |
| Eric Tipton | 2 | 8 | 1 | .125 | 0 | 0 |
| Dario Lodigiani | 1 | 1 | 0 | .000 | 0 | 0 |
| Buddy Hancken | 1 | 0 | 0 | ---- | 0 | 0 |

=== Pitching ===
==== Starting pitchers ====
Note: G = Games pitched; IP = Innings pitched; W = Wins; L = Losses; ERA = Earned run average; SO = Strikeouts

| Player | G | IP | W | L | ERA | SO |
|---|---|---|---|---|---|---|
| Johnny Babich | 31 | 229.1 | 14 | 13 | 3.73 | 94 |
| Nels Potter | 31 | 200.2 | 9 | 14 | 4.44 | 73 |
| George Caster | 36 | 178.1 | 4 | 19 | 6.56 | 75 |
| Buck Ross | 24 | 156.1 | 5 | 10 | 4.38 | 43 |
| Porter Vaughan | 18 | 99.1 | 2 | 9 | 5.35 | 46 |
| Phil Marchildon | 2 | 10.0 | 0 | 2 | 7.20 | 4 |

==== Other pitchers ====
Note: G = Games pitched; IP = Innings pitched; W = Wins; L = Losses; ERA = Earned run average; SO = Strikeouts

| Player | G | IP | W | L | ERA | SO |
|---|---|---|---|---|---|---|
| Chubby Dean | 30 | 159.1 | 6 | 13 | 6.61 | 38 |
| Bill Beckmann | 34 | 127.1 | 8 | 4 | 4.17 | 47 |
| Herman Besse | 17 | 53.0 | 0 | 3 | 8.83 | 19 |

==== Relief pitchers ====
Note: G = Games pitched; W = Wins; L = Losses; SV = Saves; ERA = Earned run average; SO = Strikeouts

| Player | G | W | L | SV | ERA | SO |
|---|---|---|---|---|---|---|
| Ed Heusser | 41 | 6 | 13 | 5 | 4.99 | 39 |
| Les McCrabb | 4 | 0 | 0 | 0 | 6.94 | 4 |
| Carl Miles | 2 | 0 | 0 | 0 | 13.50 | 6 |
| Pat McLaughlin | 1 | 0 | 0 | 0 | 16.20 | 0 |

== Farm system ==
| Level | Team | League | Manager |
|---|---|---|---|
| AA | Toronto Maple Leafs | International League | Tony Lazzeri |
| A | Williamsport Grays | Eastern League | Fresco Thompson |
| B | Wilmington Blue Rocks | Interstate League | Chief Bender and Charlie Berry |
| D | Federalsburg A's | Eastern Shore League | Sam Nisonoff and Joe Maynard |
