= 1940 Boston Red Sox season =

Major League Baseball season

1940 Boston Red Sox
- League: American League
- Ballpark: Fenway Park
- City: Boston, Massachusetts
- Record: 82–72 (.532)
- League place: 4th
- Owners: Tom Yawkey
- President: Tom Yawkey
- General managers: Eddie Collins
- Managers: Joe Cronin
- Radio: WAAB (Jim Britt, Tom Hussey)
- Stats: ESPN.com; Baseball Reference

The 1940 Boston Red Sox season was the 40th season in the franchise's Major League Baseball history. The Red Sox finished tied for fourth place in the American League (AL) with a record of 82 wins and 72 losses, eight games behind the Detroit Tigers.

== Preseason ==
=== Transactions ===
- November 12, 1939: The Red Sox purchase outfielder Dom DiMaggio and pitcher Larry Powell from the San Francisco Seals.
- December 8, 1939: The Red Sox purchase infielder Marvin Owen from the Chicago White Sox.
- December 26, 1939: The Brooklyn Dodgers purchase infielder Louis "Boze" Berger from the Red Sox off of waivers.
- January 25, 1940: The Red Sox announce the signing of pitcher Earl Johnson to a contract.
- February 2, 1940: Catcher Moe Berg is removed from the active roster. Berg would remain with the Red Sox as a coach for the 1940 and 1941 seasons.
- February 8, 1940: The Red Sox sell pitcher Elden Aukur to the St. Louis Browns.
- February 13, 1940: The Red Sox sell outfielder Joe Vosmik to the Brooklyn Dodgers.
- March 29, 1940: The Red Sox send pitcher Russell Evans to the Minneapolis Millers to complete the deal in which Herb Hash, George Lacy, and Bill Butland were sent to the Red Sox from Minneapolis.
- April 14, 1940: Pitcher Ted Olson is sold by the Red Sox to the Baltimore Orioles.

== Regular season ==
=== Transactions ===
- April 23: The Red Sox sign pitcher Emmett O'Neill of St. Mary's College.
- April 25: The St. Louis Browns sell catcher Joe Glenn to the Boston Red Sox.
- April 28: The Philadelphia Phillies announce the purchase of first baseman Art Mahan from the Louisville Colonels.
- July 25: Baseball Commissioner Kenesaw M. Landis fines the Red Sox $500 and forces them to release Pitcher Larry Jansen after Red Sox scout Ernie Johson signed Jansen to an illegal "blank contract."
- August 3: The Brooklyn Dodgers purchase pitcher Lesley Flowers from the Louisville Colonels.
- August 13: The Red Sox purchase pitcher Bill Fleming from the Hollywood Stars of the Pacific Coast League.
- August 19: The Red Sox claim infielder Charles Gelbert off of waivers from the Washington Nationals.
- September 5: The Red Sox announce the acquisition of shortstop Skeeter Newsome from the Baltimore Orioles in exchange for Hal Seling and another player to be named later.
- September 6: The Red Sox announce the purchase of pitcher Mike Ryba from the Rochester Red Wings for cash and a player to be named later.
- September 11: The Red Sox sell outfielder Leo Nonnenkamp to the Newark Bears.

=== Season standings ===
American League
Team	W	L	Pct.	GB	Home	Road
Detroit Tigers	90	64	.584	—	50‍–‍29	40‍–‍35
Cleveland Indians	89	65	.578	1	51‍–‍30	38‍–‍35
New York Yankees	88	66	.571	2	52‍–‍24	36‍–‍42
Boston Red Sox	82	72	.532	8	45‍–‍34	37‍–‍38
Chicago White Sox	82	72	.532	8	41‍–‍36	41‍–‍36
St. Louis Browns	67	87	.435	23	37‍–‍39	30‍–‍48
Washington Senators	64	90	.416	26	36‍–‍41	28‍–‍49
Philadelphia Athletics	54	100	.351	36	29‍–‍42	25‍–‍58

=== Record vs. opponents ===
1940 American League record Sources:
Team	BOS	CWS	CLE	DET	NYY	PHA	SLB	WSH
Boston	—	11–11	8–14	11–11	9–13	18–4	12–10	13–9
Chicago	11–11	—	6–16	13–9	11–11–1	16–6	13–9	12–10
Cleveland	14–8	16–6	—	11–11	10–12	14–8	11–11–1	13–9
Detroit	11–11	9–13	11–11	—	14–8	11–11	18–4–1	16–6
New York	13–9	11–11–1	12–10	8–14	—	13–9	14–8	17–5
Philadelphia	4–18	6–16	8–14	11–11	9–13	—	8–14	8–14
St. Louis	10–12	9–13	11–11–1	4–18–1	8–14	14–8	—	11–11
Washington	9–13	10–12	9–13	6–16	5–17	14–8	11–11	—

=== Opening Day lineup ===
7	Dom DiMaggio	RF
8	Doc Cramer	CF
9	Ted Williams	LF
3	Jimmie Foxx	1B
4	Joe Cronin	SS
1	Bobby Doerr	2B
5	Jim Tabor	3B
2	Gene Desautels	C
10	Lefty Grove	P

=== Roster ===
1940 Boston Red Sox
Roster
Pitchers: 17 Jim Bagby; 28 Bill Butland; 16 Emerson Dickman; 28 Bill Fleming; 12 Denny Galehouse; 10 Lefty Grove; 20 Mickey Harris; 29 Herb Hash; 19 Joe Heving; 20 Earl Johnson; 28 Alex Mustaikis; 21 Fritz Ostermueller; 15 Woody Rich; 27 Yank Terry; 27 Charlie Wagner; 18 Jack Wilson	Catchers: 2 Gene Desautels; 26 Joe Glenn; 23 Johnny Peacock; Infielders: 14 Tom Carey; 4 Joe Cronin; 1 Bobby Doerr; 3 Jimmie Foxx; 15 Charlie Gelbert; 32 Tony Lupien; 6 Marv Owen; 5 Jim Tabor	Outfielders: 8 Doc Cramer; 7 Dom DiMaggio; 25 Lou Finney; 24 Stan Spence; 9 Ted Williams; Other batters: 24 Red Nonnenkamp	Manager: 4 Joe Cronin; Coaches: 22 Moe Berg (First base); 30 Tom Daly (Third base); 31 Frank Shellenback (Pitching)

== Player stats ==
=== Batting ===
==== Starters by position ====
Note: Pos = Position; G = Games played; AB = At bats; H = Hits; Avg. = Batting average; HR = Home runs; RBI = Runs batted in

Pos	Player	G	AB	H	Avg.	HR	RBI
C	Gene Desautels	71	222	50	.225	0	17
1B	Jimmie Foxx	144	515	153	.297	36	119
2B	Bobby Doerr	151	595	173	.291	22	105
SS	Joe Cronin	149	548	156	.285	24	111
3B	Jim Tabor	120	459	131	.285	21	81
OF	Doc Cramer	150	661	200	.303	1	51
OF	Ted Williams	144	561	193	.344	23	113
OF	Dom DiMaggio	108	418	126	.301	8	46

==== Other batters ====
Note: G = Games played; AB = At bats; H = Hits; Avg. = Batting average; HR = Home runs; RBI = Runs batted in

Player	G	AB	H	Avg.	HR	RBI
Lou Finney	130	534	171	.320	5	73
Johnny Peacock	63	131	37	.282	0	13
Charlie Gelbert	30	91	18	.198	0	8
Stan Spence	51	68	19	.279	2	13
Tom Carey	43	62	20	.323	0	7
Marv Owen	20	57	12	.211	0	6
Joe Glenn	22	47	6	.128	0	4
Tony Lupien	10	19	9	.474	0	4
Red Nonnenkamp	9	7	0	.000	0	1

=== Pitching ===
==== Starting pitchers ====
Note: G = Games pitched; IP = Innings pitched; W = Wins; L = Losses; ERA = Earned run average; SO = Strikeouts

Player	G	IP	W	L	ERA	SO
Lefty Grove	22	153.1	7	6	3.99	62
Denny Galehouse	25	120.0	6	6	5.18	53
Bill Butland	3	21.0	1	2	5.57	5

==== Other pitchers ====
Note: G = Games pitched; IP = Innings pitched; W = Wins; L = Losses; ERA = Earned run average; SO = Strikeouts

Player	G	IP	W	L	ERA	SO
Jim Bagby	36	182.2	10	16	4.73	57
Jack Wilson	41	157.2	12	6	5.08	102
Fritz Ostermueller	31	143.2	5	9	4.95	80
Herb Hash	34	120.0	7	7	4.95	36
Joe Heving	39	119.0	12	7	4.01	55
Emerson Dickman	35	100.0	8	6	6.03	40
Earl Johnson	17	70.1	6	2	4.09	26
Mickey Harris	13	68.1	4	2	5.00	36
Bill Fleming	10	46.1	1	2	4.86	24
Yank Terry	4	19.1	1	0	8.84	9
Alex Mustaikis	6	15.0	0	1	9.00	6
Woody Rich	3	11.2	1	0	0.77	8

==== Relief pitchers ====
Note: G = Games pitched; W = Wins; L = Losses; SV = Saves; ERA = Earned run average; SO = Strikeouts

Player	G	W	L	SV	ERA	SO
Charlie Wagner	12	1	0	0	5.52	13
Ted Williams	1	0	0	0	4.50	1

== Farm system ==
Level	Team	League	Manager
AA	Louisville Colonels	American Association	Bill Burwell
A	Scranton Red Sox	Eastern League	Nemo Leibold
B	Rocky Mount Red Sox	Piedmont League	Heinie Manush
C	Canton Terriers	Middle Atlantic League	Floyd "Pat" Patterson
D	Elizabethton Betsy Red Sox	Appalachian League	Hobe Brummette
D	Danville-Schoolfield Leafs	Bi-State League	Red Barnes
D	Centreville Red Sox	Eastern Shore League	Ed Walls
