= Smockville, Indiana =

Unincorporated community in Indiana, United States

- Unincorporated community
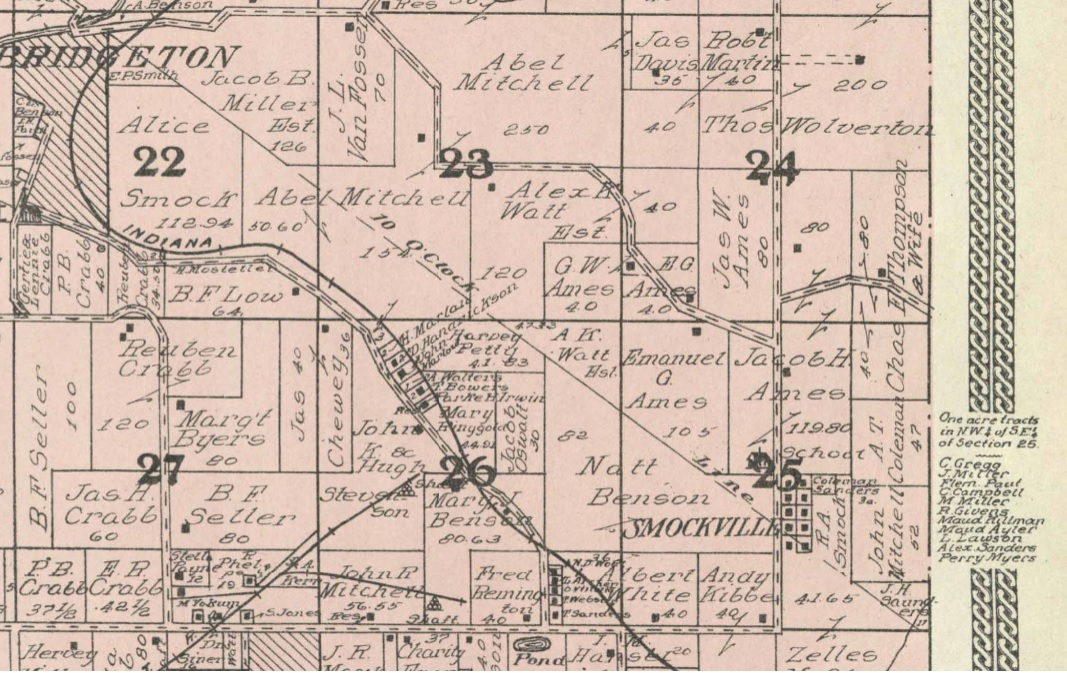
- Except of 1908 atlas of Parke County, showing Smockville at bottom right, with Bridgeton at top left

- Parke County's location in Indiana

- Location in Parke County
- Coordinates: 39°37′34″N 87°07′59″W
- Country: United States
- State: Indiana
- County: Parke
- Township: Raccoon
- Elevation: 660 ft (200 m)
- Time zone: UTC-5 (Eastern (EST))
  - Summer (DST): UTC-4 (EDT)
- ZIP code: 47837
- Area code: 765
- GNIS feature ID: 443711

Smockville was an unincorporated rural community in Raccoon Township, Parke County, in the U.S. state of Indiana. It is located approximately 2.3 miles south of Conley's Ford Covered Bridge on County Road 550E, and about a 3.5 mile drive southeast of Bridgeton.

== History ==
Smockville had its start as a coal community. Minor references to Smockville existing appear in local newspapers in the early 20th century. A 1908 county atlas shows Smockville on a map of Raccoon Township, with a notation of around ten one-acre tracts situated in the northwest part of the southeast quadrant of Section 25 of the township. A 2010 report on the county referred to Smockville as a "crossroads community."

== Geography ==
Smockville is located at 39°37′34″N 87°07′59″W at an elevation of 659 feet.
