= 1940 Cleveland Indians season =

1940 Cleveland Indians
- League: American League
- Ballpark: League Park; Cleveland Municipal Stadium
- City: Cleveland, Ohio
- Owners: Alva Bradley
- General managers: Cy Slapnicka
- Managers: Ossie Vitt
- Radio: WCLE (Jack Graney, Pinky Hunter)

The 1940 Cleveland Indians season was a season in American major league baseball. The team finished second in the American League with a record of 89–65, one game behind the Detroit Tigers. Had the Indians finished ahead of the Tigers, The Indians would have played their cross state National League rivals, the National League Champion Cincinnati Reds, in the World Series. The World Series would have been the only all Ohio World series. The season is infamous for ten Indian players confronting owner Alva Bradley and demanding the removal of manager Ossie Vitt, saying the man's behavior was harming the team. When the news broke, the public sided with Vitt and the Indians were dismissed as "crybabies." The movement has since been named the "Crybaby Rebellion."

== Regular season ==
- April 16, 1940: Indians pitcher Bob Feller threw what is, to date, the only Opening Day no-hitter. Feller walked five and struck out eight as the Indians beat the White Sox, 1–0, at Comiskey Park.

=== Season standings ===
American League
Team	W	L	Pct.	GB	Home	Road
Detroit Tigers	90	64	.584	—	50‍–‍29	40‍–‍35
Cleveland Indians	89	65	.578	1	51‍–‍30	38‍–‍35
New York Yankees	88	66	.571	2	52‍–‍24	36‍–‍42
Boston Red Sox	82	72	.532	8	45‍–‍34	37‍–‍38
Chicago White Sox	82	72	.532	8	41‍–‍36	41‍–‍36
St. Louis Browns	67	87	.435	23	37‍–‍39	30‍–‍48
Washington Senators	64	90	.416	26	36‍–‍41	28‍–‍49
Philadelphia Athletics	54	100	.351	36	29‍–‍42	25‍–‍58

=== Record vs. opponents ===
1940 American League record Sources:
Team	BOS	CWS	CLE	DET	NYY	PHA	SLB	WSH
Boston	—	11–11	8–14	11–11	9–13	18–4	12–10	13–9
Chicago	11–11	—	6–16	13–9	11–11–1	16–6	13–9	12–10
Cleveland	14–8	16–6	—	11–11	10–12	14–8	11–11–1	13–9
Detroit	11–11	9–13	11–11	—	14–8	11–11	18–4–1	16–6
New York	13–9	11–11–1	12–10	8–14	—	13–9	14–8	17–5
Philadelphia	4–18	6–16	8–14	11–11	9–13	—	8–14	8–14
St. Louis	10–12	9–13	11–11–1	4–18–1	8–14	14–8	—	11–11
Washington	9–13	10–12	9–13	6–16	5–17	14–8	11–11	—

=== Notable transactions ===
- May 13, 1940: Willis Hudlin was released by the Indians.

=== Opening Day Lineup ===
Opening Day Starters
#	Name	Position
5	Lou Boudreau	SS
22	Roy Weatherly	CF
11	Ben Chapman	RF
7	Hal Trosky	1B
24	Jeff Heath	LF
25	Ken Keltner	3B
9	Rollie Hemsley	C
6	Ray Mack	2B
19	Bob Feller	P

=== Roster ===
1940 Cleveland Indians
Roster
Pitchers: 15 Johnny Allen; 12 Nate Andrews; 17 Joe Dobson; 24 Cal Dorsett; 10 Harry Eisenstat; 19 Bob Feller; 18 Mel Harder; 35 Dixie Howell; 12 Willis Hudlin; 21 Johnny Humphries; 33 Ken Jungels; 20 Al Milnar; 30,25 Mike Naymick; 27,32 Al Smith; 14 Bill Zuber	Catchers: 40 Hank Helf; 9 Rollie Hemsley; 8 Frankie Pytlak; Infielders: 5 Lou Boudreau; 1 Oscar Grimes; 4 Odell Hale; 25 Ken Keltner; 6 Ray Mack; 3 Rusty Peters; 7 Hal Trosky	Outfielders: 23 Beau Bell; 34 Soup Campbell; 44,11 Ben Chapman; 24,33 Jeff Heath; 22 Roy Weatherly	Manager: 26 Ossie Vitt; Coaches: 28 Johnny Bassler (Pitching); 27 Ski Melillo (First Base); 16 Luke Sewell (Third Base)

== Player stats ==
= Indicates team leader

=== Batting ===
==== Starters by position ====
Note: Pos = Position; G = Games played; AB = At bats; H = Hits; Avg. = Batting average; HR = Home runs; RBI = Runs batted in

Pos	Player	G	AB	H	Avg.	HR	RBI
C	Rollie Hemsley	119	416	111	.267	4	42
1B	Hal Trosky	140	522	154	.295	25	93
2B	Ray Mack	146	530	150	.283	12	69
SS	Lou Boudreau	155	627	185	.295	9	101
3B	Ken Keltner	149	543	138	.254	15	77
OF	Beau Bell	120	444	124	.279	4	58
OF	Ben Chapman	143	548	157	.286	4	50
OF	Roy Weatherly	135	578	175	.303	12	59

==== Other batters ====
Note: G = Games played; AB = At bats; H = Hits; Avg. = Batting average; HR = Home runs; RBI = Runs batted in

Player	G	AB	H	Avg.	HR	RBI
Jeff Heath	100	356	78	.219	14	50
Frankie Pytlak	62	149	21	.141	0	16
Rusty Peters	30	71	17	.239	0	7
Soup Campbell	35	62	14	.226	0	2
Odell Hale	48	50	11	.220	0	6
Oscar Grimes	11	13	0	.000	0	0
Hank Helf	1	1	0	.000	0	0

=== Pitching ===
= Indicates league leader

==== Starting pitchers ====
Note: G = Games pitched; IP = Innings pitched; W = Wins; L = Losses; ERA = Earned run average; SO = Strikeouts

Player	G	IP	W	L	ERA	SO
Bob Feller	43	320.1	27	11	2.61	261
Al Milnar	37	242.1	18	10	3.27	99
Mel Harder	31	186.1	12	11	4.06	76
Al Smith	31	183.0	15	7	3.44	46
Johnny Allen	32	138.2	9	8	3.44	62

==== Other pitchers ====
Note: G = Games pitched; IP = Innings pitched; W = Wins; L = Losses; ERA = Earned run average; SO = Strikeouts

Player	G	IP	W	L	ERA	SO
Mike Naymick	13	30.0	1	2	5.10	15
Willis Hudlin	4	23.2	2	1	4.94	8
Nate Andrews	6	12.0	0	1	6.00	3
Dixie Howell	3	5.0	0	0	1.80	2
Ken Jungels	2	3.1	0	0	2.70	1
Cal Dorsett	1	1.0	0	0	9.00	0

==== Relief pitchers ====
Note: G = Games pitched; W = Wins; L = Losses; SV = Saves; ERA = Earned run average; SO = Strikeouts

Player	G	W	L	SV	ERA	SO
Joe Dobson	40	3	7	3	4.95	57
Harry Eisenstat	27	1	4	4	3.14	27
Johnny Humphries	19	0	2	1	8.29	17
Bill Zuber	17	1	1	0	5.63	12

== Awards and honors ==
All Star Game

Lou Boudreau, Shortstop

Bob Feller, Pitcher

Rollie Hemsley, Catcher

Ken Keltner, Third baseman

Ray Mack, Second baseman

Al Milnar, Pitcher

== Farm system ==
Level	Team	League	Manager
A	Wilkes-Barre Barons	Eastern League	Earl Wolgamot
B	Cedar Rapids Raiders	Illinois–Indiana–Iowa League	Ollie Marquardt
C	Flint Gems	Michigan State League	Jack Knight
C	Charleston Senators	Middle Atlantic League	Ed Hall
D	Thomasville Tommies	North Carolina State League	Jimmy Maus
D	Fargo-Moorhead Twins	Northern League	Chet Bujace and Wes Griffin
D	Mansfield Braves	Ohio State League	Dewey Strong
D	Warren Redskins	Pennsylvania State Association	Billy Rhiel
D	Salem-Roanoke Friends	Virginia League	Eli Harris and Arnold Anderson

LEAGUE CHAMPIONS: Cedar Rapids
