= Raccoon Township, Parke County, Indiana =

Raccoon Township
- Township
- Location in Parke County
- Coordinates: 39°39′01″N 87°10′55″W
- Country: United States
- State: Indiana
- County: Parke

Government
  - Type: Indiana township

Area
  - Total: 37.09 sq mi (96.1 km^{2})
  - Land: 37.05 sq mi (96.0 km^{2})
  - Water: 0.04 sq mi (0.10 km^{2}) 0.11%
- Elevation: 551 ft (168 m)

Population (2020)
  - Total: 689
  - Density: 18.6/sq mi (7.18/km^{2})
- Time zone: UTC-5 (Eastern (EST))
  - Summer (DST): UTC-4 (EDT)
- ZIP codes: 47836, 47837, 47872, 47874
- Area code: 765
- GNIS feature ID: 453778

Raccoon Township is one of thirteen townships in Parke County, Indiana, United States. At the 2020 census, its population was 689 and it had 341 housing units.

Historical population
Census	Pop.	Note	%±
1890	1,702		—
1900	2,680		57.5%
1910	2,821		5.3%
1920	1,674		−40.7%
1930	1,289		−23.0%
1940	1,353		5.0%
1950	1,006		−25.6%
1960	921		−8.4%
1970	711		−22.8%
1980	856		20.4%
1990	818		−4.4%
2000	771		−5.7%
2010	659		−14.5%
2020	689		4.6%
Source: US Decennial Census

== History ==
Raccoon Township took its name from the Big and Little Raccoon creeks.

The Bridgeton Covered Bridge, Bridgeton Historic District, Conley's Ford Covered Bridge, Jeffries Ford Covered Bridge and Nevins Covered Bridge are listed on the National Register of Historic Places.

== Geography ==
According to the 2010 census, the township has a total area of 37.09 square miles (96.1 km^{2}), of which 37.05 square miles (96.0 km^{2}) (or 99.89%) is land and 0.04 square miles (0.10 km^{2}) (or 0.11%) is water.

=== Unincorporated towns ===
- Bridgeton at 39.645041°N 87.177515°W
- Catlin at 39.693651°N 87.235293°W
- Diamond at 39.61143°N 87.166126°W
- Minshall at 39.671707°N 87.221682°W
- Smockville at 39.626153°N 87.13307°W

(This list is based on USGS data and may include former settlements.)

=== Extinct towns ===
- Walton at 39.668097°N 87.150014°W

(These towns are listed as "historical" by the USGS.)

=== Cemeteries ===
The township contains five cemeteries: Brunot, Clear Run, Denman, Hartmans and Webster.

== School districts ==
- Southwest Parke Community School Corporation

== Political districts ==
- State House District 42
- State Senate District 38
