= Jeffries Ford Covered Bridge =

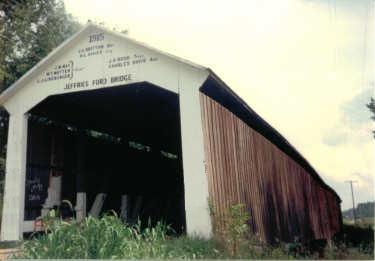
- Coordinates: 39.6300°N 87.2105°W
- Carried: Jeffries Ford Road (C.R. S150E)
- Crossed: Big Raccoon Creek
- Locale: Raccoon Township, Parke County, Indiana
- Named for: Jeffries Ford
- Owner: Parke County Commissioners; Parke County
- WGCB Number: 14-61-03x

Characteristics
- Design: Burr arch truss bridge
- Material: Wood
- Total length: 222 feet (68 m)
- Width: 16 feet (4.9 m)
- Height: 13 feet (4.0 m)

History
- Constructed by: Joseph A. Britton
- Opened: 1915
- Collapsed: April 2, 2002 (arson)
- Jeffries Ford Bridge
- U.S. National Register of Historic Places
- U.S. Historic district – Contributing property
- MPS: Parke County Covered Bridges TR
- NRHP reference No.: 78000394
- Added to NRHP: December 22, 1978

Location
- Interactive map of Jeffries Ford Covered Bridge

The Jeffries Ford Covered Bridge was southwest of Bridgeton, Indiana, United States. The double-span Burr Arch covered bridge structure was built by J. A. Britton in 1915 and destroyed by arson on April 2, 2002.

== History ==
=== Construction ===
At the time the Jeffries Ford Bridge was built Joseph A. Britton was 75 years old. Throughout his years as a bridge builder Britton had been assisted by his family and this bridge was no different, some of his sons, four by his first wife and five by his second, would have done the actual construction work. His son Eugene Britton built the Bowsher Ford Covered Bridge the same year.

It was added to the National Register of Historic Places in 1978.

=== Destruction ===
Just a few weeks before the Jeffries Ford Covered Bridge was burnt down by an arsonist, the Jackson Covered Bridge had been damaged. On April 2, 2002, the Jeffries Ford Bridge was burnt to a total loss. The residents of Parke County wanted the bridge rebuilt and tried to raise enough funds to do it, but with the burning of the Bridgeton Covered Bridge, the decision was made to rebuild the Bridgeton Bridge and replace the Jeffries Ford Bridge with a modern concrete bridge.

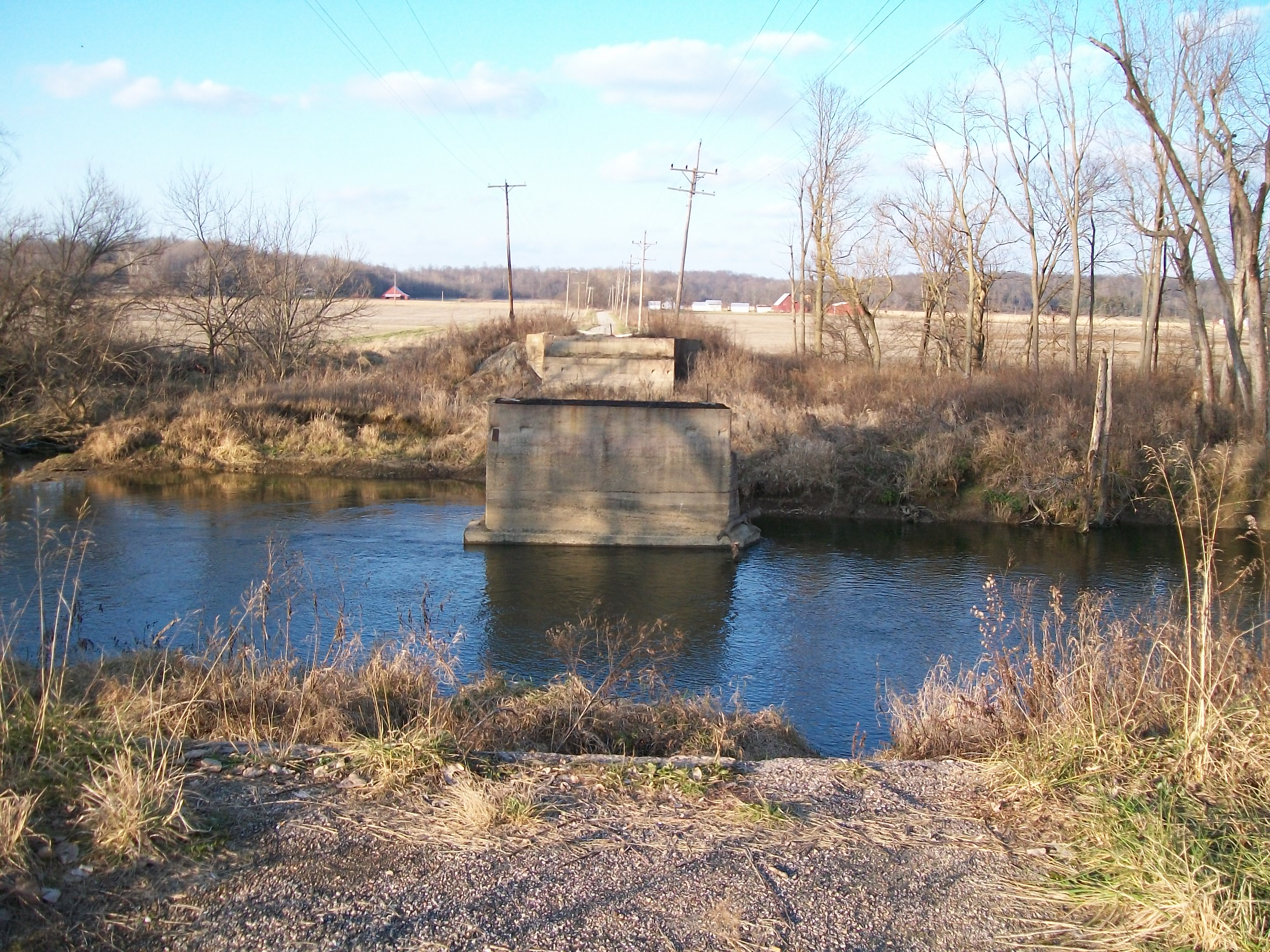
Remains of the Jeffries Ford Bridge, taken from the south side.

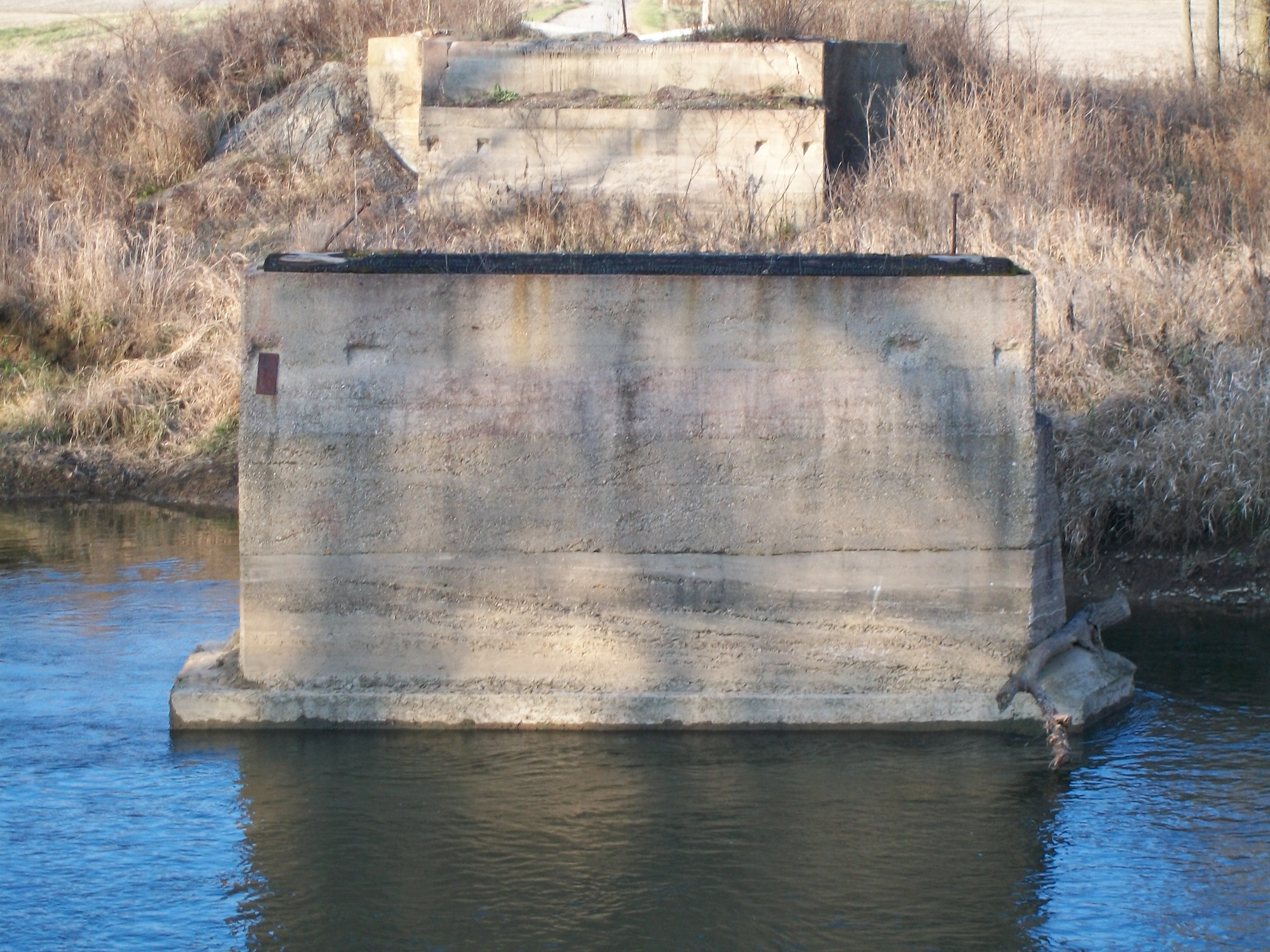
The Pier of the Jeffries Ford Bridge.

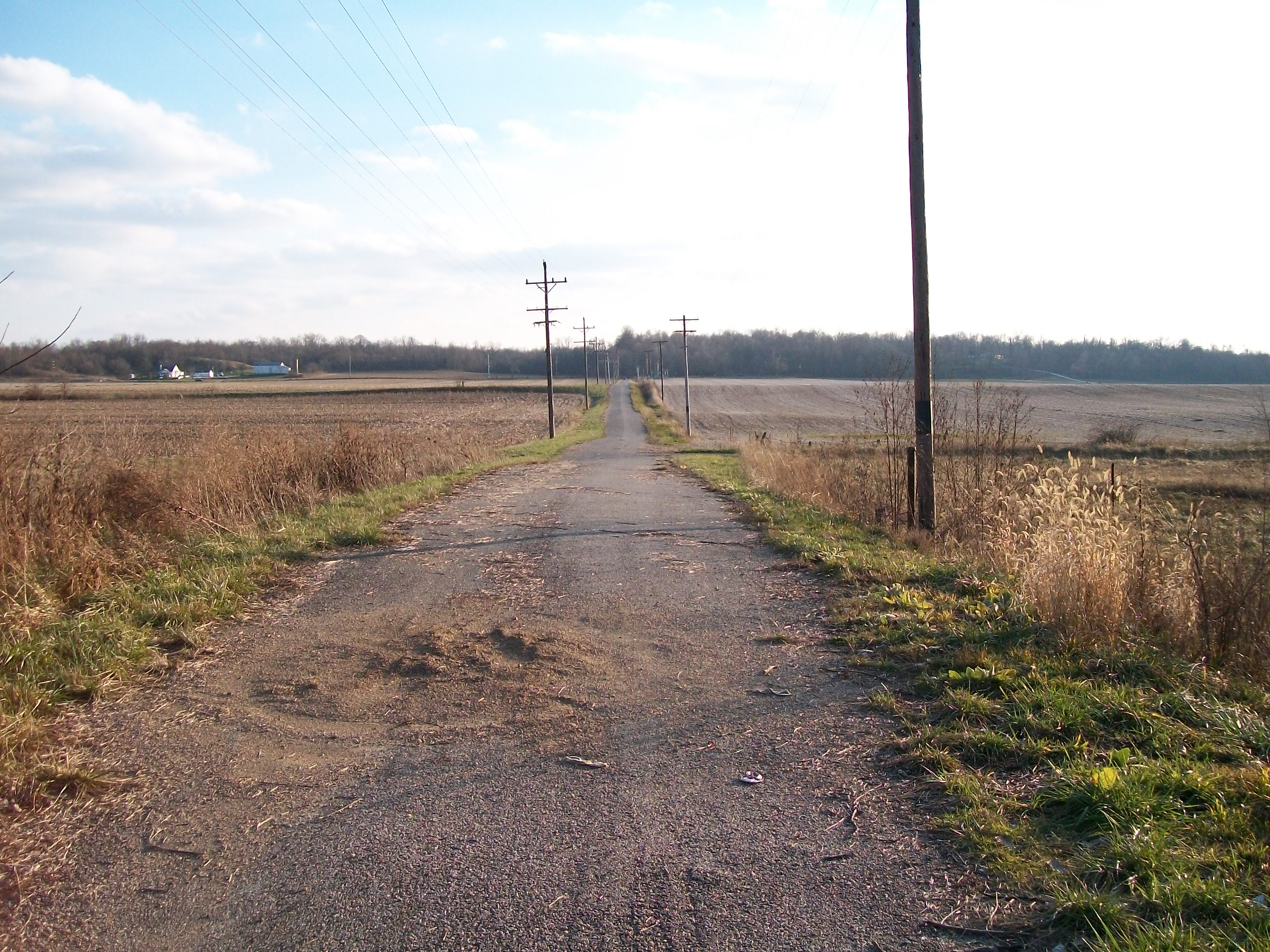
The abandoned road south of the Jeffries Ford Bridge Site.

== See also ==
- List of Registered Historic Places in Indiana
- Parke County Covered Bridges
- Parke County Covered Bridge Festival
