= Emil Bildilli =

American baseball player (1912–1946)

- Pitcher
- Born: September 16, 1912; Diamond, Indiana, U.S.
- Died: September 16, 1946 (aged 34); Hartford City, Indiana, U.S.
- Batted: Right Threw: Left

MLB debut
- August 24, 1937, for the St. Louis Browns

Last MLB appearance
- May 1, 1941, for the St. Louis Browns

MLB statistics
- Win–loss record: 4–8
- Earned run average: 5.84
- Strikeouts: 55
- Stats at Baseball Reference

Teams
- St. Louis Browns (1937–1941)

Emil "Hill Billy" Bildilli (September 16, 1912 – September 16, 1946) was an American professional baseball pitcher who appeared in 41 games in Major League Baseball over all or part of five seasons for the St. Louis Browns (1937–41). A left-hander born in Diamond, Indiana, he was listed as 5 feet 10 inches (1.78 m) tall and 170 pounds (77 kg).

== Playing career ==
=== Minor leagues ===
Bildilli grew up in Shepardsville in Vigo County, Indiana, and attended Clinton High School. As a young man, he moved to Terre Haute, where he played semiprofessional baseball. In 1937, Terre Haute's Class B Illinois-Indiana-Iowa League team, the Tots, a St. Louis Browns' farm club, signed Bildilli, then 24, to his first pro contract. He appeared in 15 games and posted a 7–7 won–lost record before the Tots folded on July 3. Bildilli then spent the rest of the 1937 minor-league campaign with the Class C Johnstown Johnnies of the Middle Atlantic League.

=== Major leagues ===
In late August, he was recalled all the way to St. Louis, getting into four games for the 1937 Browns (with one start), but he struggled, losing his only decision with a 10.13 earned run average.

Bildilli was back in the minor leagues for the bulk of 1938, but it was a banner year for him. He won 18 of 22 decisions for Springfield of the Illinois-Indiana-Iowa League, and was effective in three appearances in the high-level Texas League with San Antonio. He earned another late-season trial with the 1938 Browns, working in five games and recording his first MLB victory, but he remained ineffective, with 7.06 ERA. St. Louis sent him back to San Antonio in 1939, where he helped pitch the Missions into the playoffs by winning 22 games, tied for tops in the Texas League. Back with the Browns for a third consecutive September stint, he posted two complete games in as many starts and lowered his ERA to 3.32 in 19 innings pitched, setting the stage for his 1940 season, Bildilli's only full year in the major leagues.

Appearing in 28 games for a sixth-place 1940 Browns team that lost 87 games, Bildilli compiled a modest 2–4 won–lost mark, and his earned run average was a poor 5.57. However, on April 30, 1940, at Yankee Stadium and facing the defending world champion New York Yankees, Bildilli turned in a scintillating performance. After allowing hits to the first two batters he faced—a triple to Frankie Crosetti and an RBI single to Red Rolfe—Bildilli settled down and allowed only two more baserunners, both of whom he walked. The Browns battled back to score two runs in the middle innings, rewarding Bildilli with a two-hit, complete game 2–1 triumph.

He pitched only one more season in professional baseball. In 1941, after two early-season games and only 21/3 innings pitched, St. Louis sent him to Toledo, their top affiliate, where he struggled to a 5–9 (5.57) record. He closed the book on a major league career that included a 4–8 record and 5.84 earned run average in 41 games, including 17 starts. He registered seven career complete games and one save. In 148 innings pitched, he surrendered 184 hits and 75 walks, with 55 strikeouts.

== After pro baseball ==
In 1942, Bildilli took a job with the fire department in Muncie, Indiana, and played semi-professionally. After defeating a barnstorming team from the Negro leagues in Fort Wayne on September 14, 1946, he was driving home to Muncie when his car ran off the road and hit a tree. Bildilli suffered a fractured skull, and died two days later in Hartford City on his 34th birthday, leaving his wife and two children.
