= Minshall, Indiana =

Unincorporated community in Indiana, United States

- Unincorporated community
- Parke County's location in Indiana

- Location in Parke County
- Coordinates: 39°40′18″N 87°13′18″W
- Country: United States
- State: Indiana
- County: Parke
- Township: Raccoon
- Elevation: 548 ft (167 m)
- Time zone: UTC-5 (Eastern (EST))
  - Summer (DST): UTC-4 (EDT)
- ZIP code: 47832
- Area code: 765
- GNIS feature ID: 439274

Minshall (also known as Minchel or Odd) is an unincorporated community in Raccoon Township, Parke County, in the U.S. state of Indiana.

== History ==
A post office called Odd was established in 1884, and remained in operation until 1901. The name Minshall is for local deposits Minshall coal.

== Geography ==
Minshall is located at 39°40′18″N 87°13′18″W at an elevation of 548 feet.
