= 1940 New York Yankees season =

Season for the Major League Baseball team the New York Yankees

1940 New York Yankees
- League: American League
- Ballpark: Yankee Stadium
- City: New York City, New York
- Record: 88–66 (.571)
- League place: 3rd
- Owners: Estate of Jacob Ruppert
- General managers: Ed Barrow
- Managers: Joe McCarthy
- Radio: WABC (AM) (Mel Allen, Jay C. Flippen)

The 1940 New York Yankees season was the team's 38th season. New York was managed by Joe McCarthy. Their home games were played at Yankee Stadium. The team finished in third place with a record of 88–66, finishing two games behind the American League champion Detroit Tigers and one game behind the second-place Cleveland Indians.

== Offseason ==
- October 14, 1939: Hank Sauer was drafted from the Yankees by the Cincinnati Reds in the 1939 minor league draft.

== Regular season ==
=== Season standings ===
American League
Team	W	L	Pct.	GB	Home	Road
Detroit Tigers	90	64	.584	—	50‍–‍29	40‍–‍35
Cleveland Indians	89	65	.578	1	51‍–‍30	38‍–‍35
New York Yankees	88	66	.571	2	52‍–‍24	36‍–‍42
Boston Red Sox	82	72	.532	8	45‍–‍34	37‍–‍38
Chicago White Sox	82	72	.532	8	41‍–‍36	41‍–‍36
St. Louis Browns	67	87	.435	23	37‍–‍39	30‍–‍48
Washington Senators	64	90	.416	26	36‍–‍41	28‍–‍49
Philadelphia Athletics	54	100	.351	36	29‍–‍42	25‍–‍58

=== Record vs. opponents ===
1940 American League record Sources:
Team	BOS	CWS	CLE	DET	NYY	PHA	SLB	WSH
Boston	—	11–11	8–14	11–11	9–13	18–4	12–10	13–9
Chicago	11–11	—	6–16	13–9	11–11–1	16–6	13–9	12–10
Cleveland	14–8	16–6	—	11–11	10–12	14–8	11–11–1	13–9
Detroit	11–11	9–13	11–11	—	14–8	11–11	18–4–1	16–6
New York	13–9	11–11–1	12–10	8–14	—	13–9	14–8	17–5
Philadelphia	4–18	6–16	8–14	11–11	9–13	—	8–14	8–14
St. Louis	10–12	9–13	11–11–1	4–18–1	8–14	14–8	—	11–11
Washington	9–13	10–12	9–13	6–16	5–17	14–8	11–11	—

=== Roster ===
1940 New York Yankees
Roster
Pitchers: 24 Tiny Bonham; 24 Marv Breuer; 21 Spud Chandler; 28 Atley Donald; 11 Lefty Gomez; 27 Lee Grissom; 14 Bump Hadley; 20 Oral Hildebrand; 19 Johnny Murphy; 16 Monte Pearson; 15 Red Ruffing; 22 Marius Russo; 25 Steve Sundra	Catchers: 8 Bill Dickey; 26 Buddy Rosar; Infielders: 1 Frankie Crosetti; 12 Babe Dahlgren; 6 Joe Gordon; 10 Bill Knickerbocker; 2 Red Rolfe	Outfielders: 30 Mike Chartak; 5 Joe DiMaggio; 7 Tommy Henrich; 9 Charlie Keller; 17,27 Buster Mills; 17 Jake Powell; 3 George Selkirk	Manager: -- Joe McCarthy; Coaches: 32 Earle Combs; 31 Art Fletcher; 33 Johnny Schulte

== Player stats ==
= Indicates team leader

= Indicates league leader

=== Batting ===
==== Starters by position ====
Note: Pos = Position; G = Games played; AB = At bats; R = Runs; H = Hits; Avg. = Batting average; HR = Home runs; RBI = Runs batted in; SB = Stolen Bases

Pos	Player	G	AB	R	H	Avg.	HR	RBI	SB
C	Bill Dickey	106	372	45	92	.247	9	54	0
1B	Babe Dahlgren	155	568	51	150	.264	12	73	1
2B	Joe Gordon	155	616	112	173	.281	30	103	18
3B	Red Rolfe	139	588	102	147	.250	10	53	4
SS	Frankie Crosetti	145	546	84	106	.194	4	31	14
OF	Charlie Keller	138	500	102	143	.286	21	93	8
OF	Joe DiMaggio	132	508	93	179	.352	31	133	1
OF	George Selkirk	118	379	68	102	.269	19	71	3

==== Other batters ====
Note: G = Games played; AB = At bats; R = Runs; H = Hits; Avg. = Batting average; HR = Home runs; RBI = Runs batted in; SB = Stolen bases

Player	G	AB	R	H	Avg.	HR	RBI	SB
Tommy Henrich	90	293	57	90	.307	10	53	1
Buddy Rosar	73	228	34	68	.298	4	37	7
Bill Knickerbocker	45	124	17	30	.242	1	10	1
Buster Mills	34	63	10	25	.397	1	15	0
Jake Powell	12	27	3	5	.185	0	2	0
Mike Chartak	11	15	2	2	.133	0	3	0

=== Pitching ===
==== Starting pitchers ====
Note: G = Games pitched; IP = Innings pitched; W = Wins; L = Losses; ERA = Earned run average; SO = Strikeouts

Player	G	IP	W	L	ERA	SO
Red Ruffing	30	226.0	15	12	3.38	97
Marius Russo	30	189.1	14	8	3.28	87
Spud Chandler	27	172.0	8	7	4.60	56
Marv Breuer	27	164.0	8	9	4.55	71
Monte Pearson	16	109.2	7	5	3.69	43
Tiny Bonham	12	99.1	9	3	1.90	37

==== Other pitchers ====
Note: G = Games pitched; IP = Innings pitched; W = Wins; L = Losses; ERA = Earned run average; SO = Strikeouts

Player	G	IP	W	L	ERA	SO
Atley Donald	24	118.2	8	3	3.03	60
Steve Sundra	27	99.1	4	6	5.53	26
Lefty Gomez	9	27.1	3	3	6.59	14

==== Relief pitchers ====
Note: G = Games pitched; W = Wins; L = Losses; SV = Saves; ERA = Earned run average; SO = Strikeouts

Player	G	W	L	SV	ERA	SO
Johnny Murphy	35	8	4	9	3.69	23
Bump Hadley	25	3	5	2	5.74	39
Oral Hildebrand	13	1	1	0	1.86	5
Lee Grissom	5	0	0	0	0.00	1

== Farm system ==
Level	Team	League	Manager
AA	Kansas City Blues	American Association	Billy Meyer
AA	Newark Bears	International League	Johnny Neun
A	Binghamton Triplets	Eastern League	Bruno Betzel
B	Norfolk Tars	Piedmont League	Ray White
B	Augusta Tigers	Sally League	Phil Page
B	Wenatchee Chiefs	Western International League	John Kerr and Frank Morehouse
C	Amsterdam Rugmakers	Canadian–American League	Eddie Sawyer
C	Akron Yankees	Middle Atlantic League	Pip Koehler
C	Idaho Falls Russets	Pioneer League	Ted Mayer
C	Joplin Miners	Western Association	Paul O'Malley
D	Neosho Yankees	Arkansas–Missouri League	Ed Grayston
D	Easton Yankees	Eastern Shore League	Ray Powell
D	Butler Yankees	Pennsylvania State Association	Tom Kain
D	Norfolk Yankees	Western League	Doc Bennett

LEAGUE CHAMPIONS: Newark, Binghamton, Amsterdam, Akron, Butler

Arkansas–Missouri League folded, July 1, 1940
