= 1940 Washington Senators season =

1940 Washington Senators
- League: American League
- Ballpark: Griffith Stadium
- City: Washington, D.C.
- Record: 64–90 (.416)
- League place: 7th
- Owners: Clark Griffith and William Richardson
- Managers: Bucky Harris
- Radio: WJSV (Arch McDonald)

The 1940 Washington Senators won 64 games, lost 90, and finished in seventh place in the American League. They were managed by Bucky Harris and played home games at Griffith Stadium.

== Regular season ==
=== Season standings ===
American League
Team	W	L	Pct.	GB	Home	Road
Detroit Tigers	90	64	.584	—	50‍–‍29	40‍–‍35
Cleveland Indians	89	65	.578	1	51‍–‍30	38‍–‍35
New York Yankees	88	66	.571	2	52‍–‍24	36‍–‍42
Boston Red Sox	82	72	.532	8	45‍–‍34	37‍–‍38
Chicago White Sox	82	72	.532	8	41‍–‍36	41‍–‍36
St. Louis Browns	67	87	.435	23	37‍–‍39	30‍–‍48
Washington Senators	64	90	.416	26	36‍–‍41	28‍–‍49
Philadelphia Athletics	54	100	.351	36	29‍–‍42	25‍–‍58

=== Record vs. opponents ===
1940 American League record Sources:
Team	BOS	CWS	CLE	DET	NYY	PHA	SLB	WSH
Boston	—	11–11	8–14	11–11	9–13	18–4	12–10	13–9
Chicago	11–11	—	6–16	13–9	11–11–1	16–6	13–9	12–10
Cleveland	14–8	16–6	—	11–11	10–12	14–8	11–11–1	13–9
Detroit	11–11	9–13	11–11	—	14–8	11–11	18–4–1	16–6
New York	13–9	11–11–1	12–10	8–14	—	13–9	14–8	17–5
Philadelphia	4–18	6–16	8–14	11–11	9–13	—	8–14	8–14
St. Louis	10–12	9–13	11–11–1	4–18–1	8–14	14–8	—	11–11
Washington	9–13	10–12	9–13	6–16	5–17	14–8	11–11	—

=== Notable transactions ===
- May 18, 1940: Willis Hudlin was signed as a free agent by the Senators.

=== Roster ===
1940 Washington Senators
Roster
Pitchers: 3 Red Anderson; 14,35 Alex Carrasquel; 11 Ken Chase; 19 Joe Haynes; 35 Al Hollingsworth; 18,34 Willis Hudlin; 15 Sid Hudson; 17 Bucky Jacobs; 12 Joe Krakauskas; 16 Dutch Leonard; 22 Walt Masterson; 25 René Monteagudo; -- Lou Thuman; 34 Gil Torres	Catchers: 20 Jake Early; 32 Al Evans; 8 Rick Ferrell; 29 Dick Hahn; Infielders: -- Morrie Aderholt; 9 Jimmy Bloodworth; 3,18 Zeke Bonura; 21 Charlie Gelbert; 1 Buddy Myer; 7 Jimmy Pofahl; 28 Sherry Robertson; 35 Jack Sanford; 5 Cecil Travis; 34 Mickey Vernon; 3 Jimmy Wasdell; 23 Sam West	Outfielders: 6 George Case; 2 Buddy Lewis; 21 Jim Mallory; 4 Gee Walker; 24 Johnny Welaj	Manager: 30 Bucky Harris; Coaches: 28 Nick Altrock; 26 Benny Bengough; 27 Ossie Bluege; 29 Clyde Milan

== Player stats ==
=== Batting ===
==== Starters by position ====
Note: Pos = Position; G = Games played; AB = At bats; H = Hits; Avg. = Batting average; HR = Home runs; RBI = Runs batted in

Pos	Player	G	AB	H	Avg.	HR	RBI
C	Rick Ferrell	103	326	89	.273	0	28
1B	Zeke Bonura	79	311	85	.273	3	45
2B	Jimmy Bloodworth	119	469	115	.245	11	70
SS	Jimmy Pofahl	119	406	95	.234	2	36
3B	Cecil Travis	136	528	170	.322	2	76
OF	Gee Walker	140	595	175	.294	13	96
OF	Buddy Lewis	148	600	190	.317	6	63
OF	George Case	154	656	192	.293	5	56

==== Other batters ====
Note: G = Games played; AB = At bats; H = Hits; Avg. = Batting average; HR = Home runs; RBI = Runs batted in

Player	G	AB	H	Avg.	HR	RBI
Johnny Welaj	88	215	55	.256	3	21
Buddy Myer	71	210	61	.290	0	29
Jake Early	80	206	53	.257	5	14
Jack Sanford	34	122	24	.197	0	10
Sam West	57	99	25	.253	1	18
Charlie Gelbert	22	54	20	.370	0	7
Jimmy Wasdell	10	35	3	.086	0	0
Sherry Robertson	10	33	7	.212	0	0
Al Evans	14	25	8	.320	0	7
Mickey Vernon	5	19	3	.158	0	0
Jim Mallory	4	12	2	.167	0	0
Dick Hahn	1	3	0	.000	0	0
Morrie Aderholt	1	2	0	.000	0	0

=== Pitching ===
==== Starting pitchers ====
Note: G = Games pitched; IP = Innings pitched; W = Wins; L = Losses; ERA = Earned run average; SO = Strikeouts

Player	G	IP	W	L	ERA	SO
Dutch Leonard	35	289.0	14	19	3.49	124
Ken Chase	35	261.2	15	17	3.23	129
Sid Hudson	38	252.0	17	16	4.57	96
Willis Hudlin	8	37.1	1	2	6.51	9
Red Anderson	2	14.0	1	1	3.86	3

==== Other pitchers ====
Note: G = Games pitched; IP = Innings pitched; W = Wins; L = Losses; ERA = Earned run average; SO = Strikeouts

Player	G	IP	W	L	ERA	SO
Walt Masterson	31	130.1	3	13	4.90	68
Joe Krakauskas	32	109.0	1	6	6.44	68
René Monteagudo	27	100.2	2	6	6.08	64
Joe Haynes	22	63.1	3	6	6.54	23
Al Hollingsworth	3	18.0	1	0	5.50	7

==== Relief pitchers ====
Note: G = Games pitched; W = Wins; L = Losses; SV = Saves; ERA = Earned run average; SO = Strikeouts

Player	G	W	L	SV	ERA	SO
Alex Carrasquel	28	6	2	0	4.88	19
Bucky Jacobs	9	0	1	0	6.00	6
Lou Thuman	2	0	0	0	14.40	0
Charlie Gelbert	2	0	0	0	9.00	1
Gil Torres	2	0	0	0	0.00	1

== Farm system ==
Level	Team	League	Manager
A1	Chattanooga Lookouts	Southern Association	Kiki Cuyler
A	Springfield Nationals	Eastern League	Spencer Abbott
B	Charlotte Hornets	Piedmont League	Calvin Griffith
B	Greenville Spinners	Sally League	Alex McColl and Gus Brittain
D	Newport/Maryville Canners	Appalachian League	Jerry Witner and Red Marion
D	Salisbury Cardinals	Eastern Shore League	Gus Brittain and Ed Kobesky
D	Orlando Senators	Florida State League	John Ganzel
D	Shelby Colonels	Tar Heel League	Lou Haneles and Art Patchin

LEAGUE CHAMPIONS: Orlando
Newport (TN) club played in Maryville (TN), July 31 to August 11, 1940; Shelby club folded, July 19
