= Alex Mustaikis =

American baseball player (1909–1970)

- Pitcher
- Born: March 26, 1909; Chelsea, Massachusetts, U.S.
- Died: January 17, 1970 (aged 60); Scranton, Pennsylvania, U.S.
- Batted: Right Threw: Right

MLB debut
- July 7, 1940, for the Boston Red Sox

Last MLB appearance
- August 3, 1940, for the Boston Red Sox

MLB statistics
- Win–loss record: 0–1
- Earned run average: 9.00
- Strikeouts: 6
- Stats at Baseball Reference

Teams
- Boston Red Sox (1940)

Alexander Dominick Mustaikis (March 26, 1909 – January 17, 1970) was an American pitcher in Major League Baseball who played briefly for the Boston Red Sox during the 1940 season. Listed at 6 ft 3 in (1.91 m), 180 lb., Mustaikis batted and threw right-handed. He was born in Chelsea, Massachusetts.

In one season career, Mustaikis posted a 0–1 record with six strikeouts and a 9.00 ERA in six appearances, including one start, three games finished, and 15.0 innings of work.

Mustaikis died at the age of 60 in Scranton, Pennsylvania.

== See also ==
- 1940 Boston Red Sox season
- Boston Red Sox all-time roster
