= 1940 Chicago White Sox season =

1940 Chicago White Sox
- League: American League
- Ballpark: Comiskey Park
- City: Chicago
- Owners: Grace Comiskey
- General manager: Harry Grabiner
- Managers: Jimmy Dykes
- Radio: WGN (AM) (Bob Elson, Jack Brickhouse); WCFL (Hal Totten, Jimmy Dudley); WJJD (Charlie Grimm, Lew Fonseca); WBBM (AM) (John Harrington, Pat Flanagan)

The 1940 Chicago White Sox season was the team's 40th season in the major leagues, and its 41st season overall. They finished with a record of 82–72, good enough tied for fourth place with the Boston Red Sox in the American League, 8 games behind the first place Detroit Tigers.

== Offseason ==
- December 8, 1939: Rip Radcliff was traded by the White Sox to the St. Louis Browns for Moose Solters.

== Regular season ==
- April 16, 1940: Bob Feller of the Cleveland Indians threw what is, to date, the only Opening Day no-hitter in major league history against the White Sox. Feller walked five and struck out eight as the Indians beat the White Sox 1–0 at Comiskey Park.

=== Season standings ===
American League
Team	W	L	Pct.	GB	Home	Road
Detroit Tigers	90	64	.584	—	50‍–‍29	40‍–‍35
Cleveland Indians	89	65	.578	1	51‍–‍30	38‍–‍35
New York Yankees	88	66	.571	2	52‍–‍24	36‍–‍42
Boston Red Sox	82	72	.532	8	45‍–‍34	37‍–‍38
Chicago White Sox	82	72	.532	8	41‍–‍36	41‍–‍36
St. Louis Browns	67	87	.435	23	37‍–‍39	30‍–‍48
Washington Senators	64	90	.416	26	36‍–‍41	28‍–‍49
Philadelphia Athletics	54	100	.351	36	29‍–‍42	25‍–‍58

=== Record vs. opponents ===
1940 American League record Sources:
Team	BOS	CWS	CLE	DET	NYY	PHA	SLB	WSH
Boston	—	11–11	8–14	11–11	9–13	18–4	12–10	13–9
Chicago	11–11	—	6–16	13–9	11–11–1	16–6	13–9	12–10
Cleveland	14–8	16–6	—	11–11	10–12	14–8	11–11–1	13–9
Detroit	11–11	9–13	11–11	—	14–8	11–11	18–4–1	16–6
New York	13–9	11–11–1	12–10	8–14	—	13–9	14–8	17–5
Philadelphia	4–18	6–16	8–14	11–11	9–13	—	8–14	8–14
St. Louis	10–12	9–13	11–11–1	4–18–1	8–14	14–8	—	11–11
Washington	9–13	10–12	9–13	6–16	5–17	14–8	11–11	—

== Opening Day lineup ==
- Bob Kennedy, 3B
- Joe Kuhel, 1B
- Mike Kreevich, CF
- Moose Solters, LF
- Luke Appling, SS
- Taffy Wright, RF
- Eric McNair, 2B
- Mike Tresh, C
- Eddie Smith, P

=== Roster ===
1940 Chicago White Sox
Roster
Pitchers: 10,48 Pete Appleton; 26 Clint Brown; 18 Bill Dietrich; -- Vallie Eaves; 11,45 Orval Grove; 28 Jack Hallett; 24 Jack Knott; 27 Thornton Lee; 16 Ted Lyons; 29 Johnny Rigney; 23,46 Eddie Smith; 19 Ed Weiland	Catchers: 14 Ken Silvestri; 15 Mike Tresh; 17 Tom Turner; Infielders: 4 Luke Appling; 2 Jackie Hayes; 36 Bob Kennedy; 47 Don Kolloway; 3 Joe Kuhel; 7 Eric McNair; 37 Skeeter Webb	Outfielders: 8 Mike Kreevich; 12 Larry Rosenthal; 9 Moose Solters; 6 Taffy Wright; Other batters: -- Dave Short	Manager: 5 Jimmy Dykes; Coaches: 33 Jimmy Austin; 22 Mule Haas; 38 Muddy Ruel; 25 Monty Stratton

== Player stats ==
=== Batting ===
Note: G = Games played; AB = At bats; R = Runs scored; H = Hits; 2B = Doubles; 3B = Triples; HR = Home runs; RBI = Runs batted in; BB = Base on balls; SO = Strikeouts; AVG = Batting average; SB = Stolen bases

Player	G	AB	R	H	2B	3B	HR	RBI	BB	SO	AVG	SB
Luke Appling, SS	150	566	96	197	27	13	0	79	69	35	.348	3
Jackie Hayes, 2B	18	41	2	8	0	1	0	1	2	11	.195	0
Bob Kennedy, 3B	154	606	74	153	23	3	3	52	42	58	.252	3
Don Kolloway, 2B	10	40	5	9	1	0	0	3	0	3	.225	1
Mike Kreevich, CF	144	582	86	154	27	10	8	55	34	49	.265	15
Joe Kuhel, 1B	155	603	111	169	28	8	27	94	87	59	.280	12
Eric McNair, 2B	66	251	26	57	13	1	7	31	12	26	.227	1
Larry Rosenthal, OF	107	276	46	83	14	5	6	42	64	32	.301	2
Dave Short, PH	4	3	1	1	0	0	0	0	1	2	.333	0
Ken Silvestri, C	28	24	5	6	2	0	2	10	4	7	.250	0
Moose Solters, LF	116	428	65	132	28	3	12	80	27	54	.308	3
Mike Tresh, C	135	480	62	135	15	5	1	64	49	40	.281	3
Tom Turner, C	37	96	11	20	1	2	0	6	3	12	.208	1
Skeeter Webb, 2B, SS	84	334	33	79	11	2	1	29	30	33	.237	3
Taffy Wright, RF	147	581	79	196	31	9	5	88	43	25	.337	4

Player	G	AB	R	H	2B	3B	HR	RBI	BB	SO	AVG	SB
Pete Appleton, P	25	17	2	3	0	0	0	0	1	5	.176	0
Clint Brown, P	37	14	0	1	0	0	0	1	2	2	.071	0
Bill Dietrich, P	23	50	5	12	1	0	1	8	7	14	.240	0
Vallie Eaves, P	5	5	0	0	0	0	0	0	0	1	.000	0
Orval Grove, P	3	1	0	0	0	0	0	0	0	0	.000	0
Jack Hallett, P	2	5	0	2	0	0	0	1	0	1	.400	0
Jack Knott, P	25	57	2	5	1	0	0	4	5	17	.088	0
Thornton Lee, P	28	84	7	23	4	0	0	5	4	30	.274	0
Ted Lyons, P	22	75	4	18	4	0	0	7	2	7	.240	0
Johnny Rigney, P	40	93	5	20	4	0	0	7	3	28	.215	1
Eddie Smith, P	34	88	6	19	4	0	0	3	8	19	.216	0
Ed Weiland, P	5	5	1	1	0	0	0	0	0	3	.200	0
Team totals	155	5386	735	1499	238	63	73	671	497	569	.278	52

=== Pitching ===
Note: W = Wins; L = Losses; ERA = Earned run average; G = Games pitched; GS = Games started; SV = Saves; IP = Innings pitched; H = Hits allowed; R = Runs allowed; ER = Earned runs allowed; HR = Home runs allowed; BB = Walks allowed; K = Strikeouts

Player	W	L	ERA	G	GS	SV	IP	H	R	ER	HR	BB	K
Pete Appleton	4	0	5.62	25	0	5	57.2	54	39	36	8	28	21
Clint Brown	4	6	3.68	37	0	10	66.0	75	30	27	5	16	23
Bill Dietrich	10	6	4.03	23	17	0	149.2	154	78	67	10	65	43
Vallie Eaves	0	2	6.75	5	3	0	18.2	22	16	14	2	24	11
Orval Grove	0	0	3.00	3	0	0	6.0	4	2	2	0	4	1
Jack Hallett	1	1	6.43	2	2	0	14.0	15	10	10	1	6	9
Jack Knott	11	9	4.56	25	23	0	158.0	166	88	80	12	52	44
Thornton Lee	12	13	3.47	28	27	0	228.0	223	100	88	13	56	87
Ted Lyons	12	8	3.24	22	22	0	186.1	188	85	67	17	37	72
Johnny Rigney	14	18	3.11	39	33	3	280.2	240	117	97	22	90	141
Eddie Smith	14	9	3.21	32	28	0	207.1	179	92	74	16	95	119
Ed Weiland	0	0	8.79	5	0	0	14.1	15	15	14	5	7	3
Team totals	82	72	3.74	155	155	18	1386.2	1335	672	576	111	480	574

== Farm system ==
Level	Team	League	Manager
AA	St. Paul Saints	American Association	Babe Ganzel
B	Waterloo White Hawks	Illinois–Indiana–Iowa League	John Fitzpatrick and Fred Bedore
C	Longview Texans	East Texas League	Tex Jeanes and Al Costello
D	Rayne Rice Birds	Evangeline League	Art Bartelli
D	Jonesboro White Sox	Northeast Arkansas League	Johnny Mostil
D	Grand Forks Chiefs	Northern League	Fred Williams
D	Lubbock Hubbers	West Texas–New Mexico League	Charlie Engle
D	Wisconsin Rapids White Sox	Wisconsin State League	Frank Parenti

LEAGUE CHAMPIONS: Grand Forks
