= Catlin, Indiana =

Unincorporated community in Indiana, United States

- Unincorporated community
- Parke County's location in Indiana

- Location in Park County
- Coordinates: 39°41′37″N 87°14′07″W
- Country: United States
- State: Indiana
- County: Parke
- Township: Raccoon
- Elevation: 548 ft (167 m)
- Time zone: UTC-5 (Eastern (EST))
  - Summer (DST): UTC-4 (EDT)
- ZIP code: 47832
- Area code: 765
- GNIS feature ID: 432242

Catlin is an unincorporated community in the northwest corner of Raccoon Township, Parke County, in the U.S. state of Indiana.

== History ==
A post office was established at Catlin in 1861, and remained in operation until 1965. Hiram Catlin, an early settler, gave the community its name.
