= 1940 St. Louis Browns season =

Major League Baseball season

1940 St. Louis Browns
- League: American League
- Ballpark: Sportsman's Park
- City: St. Louis, Missouri
- Record: 67–87 (.435)
- League place: 6th
- Owners: Donald Lee Barnes
- General managers: Bill DeWitt
- Managers: Fred Haney
- Radio: KMOX (France Laux); KWK (Johnny O'Hara, Johnny Neblett); KXOK (Alex Buchan, Gabby Street, Ray Schmidt)

The 1940 St. Louis Browns season involved the Browns finishing 6th in the American League with a record of 67 wins and 87 losses.

== Offseason ==
- December 8, 1939: Moose Solters was traded by the Browns to the Chicago White Sox for Rip Radcliff.
- Prior to 1940 season: Ray Coleman was signed as an amateur free agent by the Browns.

== Regular season ==
=== Season standings ===
American League
| Team | W | L | Pct. | GB | Home | Road |
|---|---|---|---|---|---|---|
| Detroit Tigers | 90 | 64 | .584 | — | 50‍–‍29 | 40‍–‍35 |
| Cleveland Indians | 89 | 65 | .578 | 1 | 51‍–‍30 | 38‍–‍35 |
| New York Yankees | 88 | 66 | .571 | 2 | 52‍–‍24 | 36‍–‍42 |
| Boston Red Sox | 82 | 72 | .532 | 8 | 45‍–‍34 | 37‍–‍38 |
| Chicago White Sox | 82 | 72 | .532 | 8 | 41‍–‍36 | 41‍–‍36 |
| St. Louis Browns | 67 | 87 | .435 | 23 | 37‍–‍39 | 30‍–‍48 |
| Washington Senators | 64 | 90 | .416 | 26 | 36‍–‍41 | 28‍–‍49 |
| Philadelphia Athletics | 54 | 100 | .351 | 36 | 29‍–‍42 | 25‍–‍58 |

=== Record vs. opponents ===
1940 American League record Sources:
| Team | BOS | CWS | CLE | DET | NYY | PHA | SLB | WSH |
|---|---|---|---|---|---|---|---|---|
| Boston | — | 11–11 | 8–14 | 11–11 | 9–13 | 18–4 | 12–10 | 13–9 |
| Chicago | 11–11 | — | 6–16 | 13–9 | 11–11–1 | 16–6 | 13–9 | 12–10 |
| Cleveland | 14–8 | 16–6 | — | 11–11 | 10–12 | 14–8 | 11–11–1 | 13–9 |
| Detroit | 11–11 | 9–13 | 11–11 | — | 14–8 | 11–11 | 18–4–1 | 16–6 |
| New York | 13–9 | 11–11–1 | 12–10 | 8–14 | — | 13–9 | 14–8 | 17–5 |
| Philadelphia | 4–18 | 6–16 | 8–14 | 11–11 | 9–13 | — | 8–14 | 8–14 |
| St. Louis | 10–12 | 9–13 | 11–11–1 | 4–18–1 | 8–14 | 14–8 | — | 11–11 |
| Washington | 9–13 | 10–12 | 9–13 | 6–16 | 5–17 | 14–8 | 11–11 | — |

=== Notable transactions ===
- August 3, 1940: Willis Hudlin was signed as a free agent by the Browns.

=== Roster ===
1940 St. Louis Browns
Roster
| Pitchers: 18 Elden Auker; 26 Emil Bildilli; 30 Slick Coffman; 27 Bill Cox; 24 Bob Harris; 19 Willis Hudlin; 23 Vern Kennedy; 19 Jack Kramer; 20 Roxie Lawson; 22 Lefty Mills; 19 Maury Newlin; 21 Johnny Niggeling; 17 Bill Trotter; 25 John Whitehead | Catchers: 8 Sam Harshany; 9 George Susce; 7 Bob Swift; Infielders: 4 Johnny Berardino; 6 Harlond Clift; 1 Don Heffner; 3 Lyn Lary; 3 Johnny Lucadello; 5 George McQuinn; 2 Alan Strange | Outfielders: 8 Roy Cullenbine; 16 Joe Gallagher; 15 Joe Grace; 14 Myril Hoag; 12 Wally Judnich; 10 Chet Laabs; 11 Rip Radcliff; Other batters: 29 Fuzz White | Manager: 34 Fred Haney; Coaches: 33 Fred Hofmann; 32 Walter Holke |

== Player stats ==
=== Batting ===
==== Starters by position ====
Note: Pos = Position; G = Games played; AB = At bats; H = Hits; Avg. = Batting average; HR = Home runs; RBI = Runs batted in

| Pos | Player | G | AB | H | Avg. | HR | RBI |
|---|---|---|---|---|---|---|---|
| C | Bob Swift | 130 | 398 | 97 | .244 | 0 | 39 |
| 1B | George McQuinn | 151 | 594 | 166 | .279 | 16 | 84 |
| 2B | Don Heffner | 126 | 487 | 115 | .236 | 3 | 53 |
| 3B | Harlond Clift | 150 | 523 | 143 | .273 | 20 | 87 |
| SS | Johnny Berardino | 142 | 523 | 135 | .258 | 16 | 85 |
| OF | Wally Judnich | 137 | 519 | 157 | .303 | 24 | 89 |
| OF | Rip Radcliff | 150 | 584 | 200 | .342 | 7 | 81 |
| OF | Roy Cullenbine | 86 | 257 | 59 | .230 | 7 | 31 |

==== Other batters ====
Note: G = Games played; AB = At bats; H = Hits; Avg. = Batting average; HR = Home runs; RBI = Runs batted in

| Player | G | AB | H | Avg. | HR | RBI |
|---|---|---|---|---|---|---|
| Joe Grace | 80 | 229 | 59 | .258 | 5 | 25 |
| Chet Laabs | 105 | 218 | 59 | .271 | 10 | 40 |
| Myril Hoag | 76 | 191 | 50 | .262 | 3 | 26 |
| Alan Strange | 54 | 167 | 31 | .186 | 0 | 6 |
| George Susce | 61 | 113 | 24 | .212 | 0 | 13 |
| Joe Gallagher | 23 | 70 | 19 | .271 | 2 | 8 |
| Johnny Lucadello | 17 | 63 | 20 | .317 | 2 | 10 |
| Lyn Lary | 27 | 54 | 3 | .056 | 0 | 3 |
| Fuzz White | 2 | 2 | 0 | .000 | 0 | 0 |
| Sam Harshany | 3 | 1 | 0 | .000 | 0 | 0 |

=== Pitching ===
==== Starting pitchers ====
Note: G = Games pitched; IP = Innings pitched; W = Wins; L = Losses; ERA = Earned run average; SO = Strikeouts

| Player | G | IP | W | L | ERA | SO |
|---|---|---|---|---|---|---|
| Elden Auker | 38 | 263.2 | 16 | 11 | 3.96 | 78 |
| Vern Kennedy | 34 | 222.1 | 12 | 17 | 5.59 | 70 |
| Bob Harris | 35 | 193.2 | 11 | 15 | 4.93 | 49 |
| Johnny Niggeling | 28 | 153.2 | 7 | 11 | 4.45 | 82 |
| Maury Newlin | 1 | 6.0 | 1 | 0 | 6.00 | 3 |

==== Other pitchers ====
Note: G = Games pitched; IP = Innings pitched; W = Wins; L = Losses; ERA = Earned run average; SO = Strikeouts

| Player | G | IP | W | L | ERA | SO |
|---|---|---|---|---|---|---|
| Emil Bildilli | 28 | 97.0 | 2 | 4 | 5.57 | 32 |
| Jack Kramer | 16 | 64.2 | 3 | 7 | 6.26 | 12 |
| Lefty Mills | 26 | 59.0 | 0 | 6 | 7.78 | 18 |
| John Whitehead | 15 | 40.0 | 1 | 3 | 5.40 | 11 |
| Willis Hudlin | 6 | 11.1 | 0 | 1 | 11.12 | 4 |

==== Relief pitchers ====
Note: G = Games pitched; W = Wins; L = Losses; SV = Saves; ERA = Earned run average; SO = Strikeouts

| Player | G | W | L | SV | ERA | SO |
|---|---|---|---|---|---|---|
| Bill Trotter | 36 | 7 | 6 | 2 | 3.77 | 29 |
| Slick Coffman | 31 | 2 | 2 | 1 | 6.27 | 26 |
| Roxie Lawson | 30 | 5 | 3 | 4 | 5.13 | 18 |
| Bill Cox | 12 | 0 | 1 | 0 | 7.27 | 7 |

== Farm system ==
| Level | Team | League | Manager |
|---|---|---|---|
| AA | Toledo Mud Hens | American Association | Zack Taylor |
| A1 | San Antonio Missions | Texas League | Marty McManus |
| B | Springfield Browns | Illinois–Indiana–Iowa League | Art Scharein |
| C | Palestine Pals | East Texas League | Elmer Kirchoff |
| C | Tyler Trojans | East Texas League | Bobby Goff and Sam Hancock |
| C | St. Joseph Autos | Michigan State League | Conrad Fisher and Elmer Kirchoff |
| C | Youngstown Browns | Middle Atlantic League | Rod Whitney |
| C | Topeka Owls | Western Association | Bill Wilson and Pete Monahan |
| D | Pennington Gap Miners | Appalachian League | Art Hauger and James Rollins |
| D | Lafayette White Sox | Evangeline League | Harry Strohm |
| D | Mayfield Browns | KITTY League | Bennie Tate |
| D | Paragould Browns | Northeast Arkansas League | Tom Greenwade |
| D | Beaver Falls Browns | Pennsylvania State Association | Frank Oceak |
| D | Lincoln Links | Western League | Pug Griffin |

LEAGUE CHAMPIONS: Tyler, Paragould
Palestine club folded, June 5, 1940
