= Porter Vaughan =

American baseball player (1919-2008)

- Pitcher
- Born: May 11, 1919; Stevensville, Virginia
- Died: July 30, 2008 (aged 89); Richmond, Virginia
- Batted: Right Threw: Left

MLB debut
- June 16, 1940, for the Philadelphia Athletics

Last MLB appearance
- April 21, 1946, for the Philadelphia Athletics

MLB statistics
- Win–loss record: 2–11
- Earned run average: 5.83
- Strikeouts: 52
- Stats at Baseball Reference

Teams
- Philadelphia Athletics (1940–1941, 1946)

Cecil Porter Vaughan (May 11, 1919 – July 30, 2008) was an American Major League Baseball pitcher who played for the Philadelphia Athletics. He was in the military during World War II from 1942 to 1945.
