= Carl Miles =

American baseball player (1918-2016)

- Pitcher
- Born: March 22, 1918; Trenton, Missouri, U.S.
- Died: September 9, 2016 (aged 98); Bartow, Florida, U.S.
- Batted: Both Threw: Left

MLB debut
- June 8, 1940, for the Philadelphia Athletics

Last MLB appearance
- July 2, 1940, for the Philadelphia Athletics

MLB statistics
- Win–loss record: 0–0
- Earned run average: 13.50
- Strikeouts: 6
- Stats at Baseball Reference

Teams
- Philadelphia Athletics (1940)

Carl Thomas Miles (March 22, 1918 – September 9, 2016) was an American Major League Baseball pitcher who played in 1940 with the Philadelphia Athletics. He was born in Trenton, Missouri. He graduated from the University of Missouri. Miles played in two games, with a 13.50 ERA, in his one-year career. He died in September 2016 at the age of 98.
