= Woody Rich =

American baseball player (1916–1983)

- Pitcher
- Born: March 9, 1916; Morganton, North Carolina, U.S.
- Died: April 18, 1983 (aged 67); Morganton, North Carolina, U.S.
- Batted: Left Threw: Right

MLB debut
- April 22, 1939, for the Boston Red Sox

Last MLB appearance
- September 16, 1944, for the Boston Braves

MLB statistics
- Win–loss record: 6–4
- Earned run average: 5.06
- Strikeouts: 42
- Stats at Baseball Reference

Teams
- Boston Red Sox (1939–1941); Boston Braves (1944)

Woodrow Earl Rich (March 9, 1916 – April 18, 1983) was an American pitcher in Major League Baseball who played from 1939 through 1944 for the Boston Red Sox (1939–41) and Boston Braves (1944). Listed at 6 ft 2 in (1.88 m), 185 lb (84 kg), Rich batted left-handed and threw right-handed. He was born in Morganton, North Carolina.

In a four-season major league career, Rich posted a 6–4 record with a 5.06 ERA in 33 appearances, including 16 starts, five complete games, one save, 42 strikeouts, 50 walks, and 117 1/3 innings of work. Rich also pitched 22 seasons in the minor leagues, winning 250 games and pitching over 3200 innings for 17 teams.

Rich served in the United States Marine Corps in 1945 during World War II.

Rich died in Morganton, North Carolina, at the age of 67.
