= Bill Fleming =

American baseball player (1913–2006)

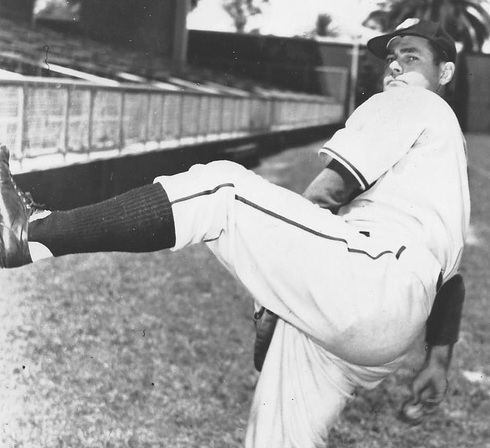
- Pitcher
- Born: July 31, 1913; Rowland Heights, California, U.S.
- Died: June 4, 2006 (aged 92); Reno, Nevada, U.S.
- Batted: Right Threw: Right

MLB debut
- August 21, 1940, for the Boston Red Sox

Last MLB appearance
- July 19, 1946, for the Chicago Cubs

MLB statistics
- Win–loss record: 16–21
- Earned run average: 3.79
- Strikeouts: 167
- Stats at Baseball Reference

Teams
- Boston Red Sox (1940–1941); Chicago Cubs (1942–1944, 1946)

Leslie Fletchard "Bill" Fleming (July 31, 1913 – June 4, 2006) was an American professional baseball pitcher. A right-hander, the native of Rowland Heights, California, stood 6 feet (1.83 m) tall and weighed 190 pounds (86 kg), and attended Saint Mary's College of California. His professional career lasted for 16 seasons between 1936 and 1953, missing the 1945 campaign because of service in the United States Army during World War II.

Fleming won 128 games in minor league baseball and appeared in all or parts of six Major League seasons for the Boston Red Sox (1940–41) and Chicago Cubs (1942–44, 1946). In his MLB career, Fleming posted a 16–21 win–loss record with a 3.79 earned run average and 167 strikeouts in 123 games pitched (40 as a starter).

Fleming died in Reno, Nevada on June 4, 2006, at the age of 92.
