= Mike Naymick =

American baseball player (1917–2005)

- Pitcher
- Born: August 26, 1917; Berlin, Pennsylvania, U.S.
- Died: October 12, 2005 (aged 88); Stockton, California, U.S.
- Batted: Right Threw: Right

MLB debut
- September 24, 1939, for the Cleveland Indians

Last MLB appearance
- July 6, 1944, for the St. Louis Cardinals

MLB statistics
- Win–loss record: 5–7
- Earned run average: 3.93
- Strikeouts: 64
- Stats at Baseball Reference

Teams
- Cleveland Indians (1939–1940, 1943–1944); St. Louis Cardinals (1944)

Michael John Naymick (August 26, 1917 – October 12, 2005) was an American Major League Baseball pitcher who played for four seasons. A 6 ft 8 in (2.03 m), 225 lb (102 kg) pitcher, he played for the Cleveland Indians from 1939 to 1940 and from 1943 to 1944, and the St. Louis Cardinals in 1944.
