= Bridgeton Covered Bridge =

Two bridges in Indiana, US

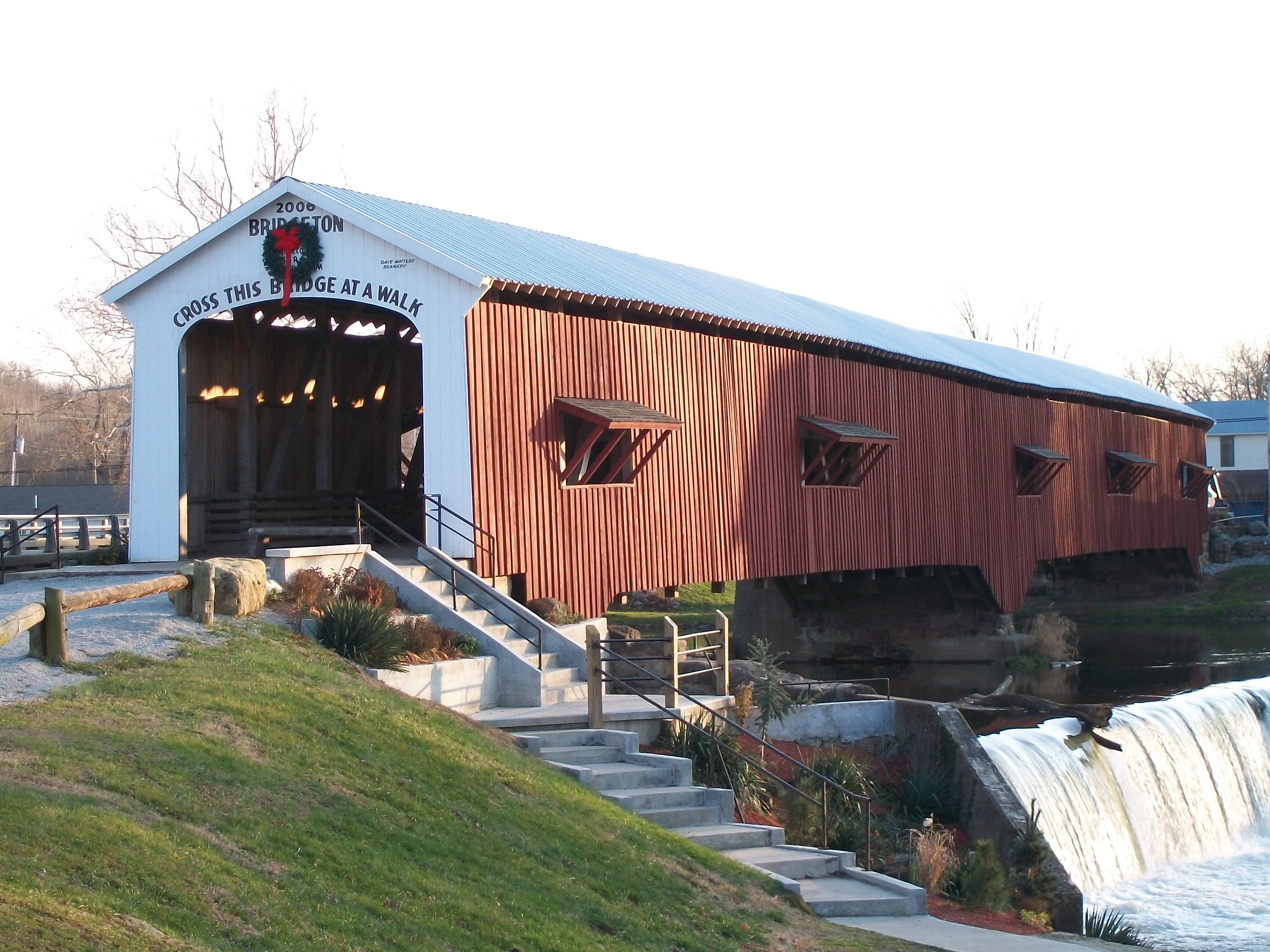
- Rebuilt Bridgeton Covered Bridge (2006–present)
- Coordinates: 39°38′57.82″N 87°10′34.43″W
- Carries: Pedestrian traffic
- Crosses: Big Raccoon Creek
- Locale: Bridgeton, Indiana
- Official name: Bridgeton Bridge
- Named for: Bridgeton, Indiana

Characteristics
- Design: Burr arch truss bridge
- Material: Sandstone block (foundations)
- Trough construction: Wood
- Pier construction: Unknown
- Total length: 267 ft (81.4 m) (includes 11 ft (3.4 m) overhangs on each end)
- Width: 13 ft (4.0 m)
- Longest span: 122.5 ft (37.3 m)
- No. of spans: 2
- Piers in water: 1
- Clearance above: 12 ft (3.7 m)

History
- Designer: Steve Arnold; Chuck Ennis; Mike Cooper; Ron May; Ben Hill
- Constructed by: Dan Collom & local community
- Construction cost: $125,000
- Opened: October 1, 2006

Location
- Interactive map of Bridgeton Covered Bridge

Bridgeton Covered Bridge
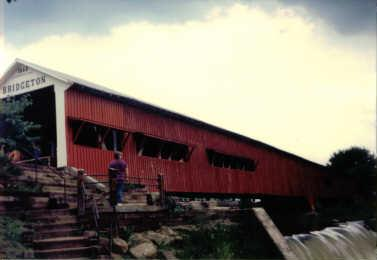
- Old bridge
- Coordinates: 39°38′56″N 87°10′34″W
- Carries: Bridgeton Road; Bridge bypassed in 1967
- Crosses: Big Raccoon Creek
- Locale: Bridgeton, Indiana
- Official name: Bridgeton Bridge
- Named for: Bridgeton, Indiana
- WGCB #: 14-61-04

Characteristics
- Design: Burr arch truss bridge
- Material: Sandstone block (foundations)
- Trough construction: Wood
- Pier construction: Unknown
- Total length: 267 ft (81.4 m) (includes 11 ft (3.4 m) overhangs on each end)
- Width: 13 ft (4.0 m)
- Longest span: 122.5 ft (37.3 m)
- No. of spans: 2
- Piers in water: 1
- Clearance above: 12 ft (3.7 m)

History
- Construction cost: $10,200
- Bridgeton Covered Bridge (#8)
- U.S. National Register of Historic Places
- U.S. Historic district – Contributing property
- Location within Parke County, Indiana Location within Indiana Location within the United States
- Built: 1868
- Built by: J. J. Daniels
- Demolished: April 28, 2005 (Arson)
- Website: Bridgeton Bridge
- Part of: Parke County Covered Bridges TR (ID64000193)
- NRHP reference No.: 78000386
- Added to NRHP: December 22, 1978

The first Bridgeton covered bridge was a double-span Burr Arch bridge built in 1868 in Bridgeton, Indiana by a crew led by J. J. Daniels. It was closed to traffic in 1967. It was built to replace two prior open wooden bridges that had fallen in. After its destruction by fire, it was replaced in 2006 by a reproduction.

== First bridge ==
About 1823, Kockwood and Silliman built the first mill, in the location that would develop a bad reputation and often be referred to as "Sodom", on Big Raccoon Creek. Later, in an attempt to change the town's reputation, the town would become Bridgeton after the earlier bridge. The first mill was owned by Oniel and Wasson and later be bought by James Searing. From 1850 to 1860, James A. Rea would run the mill. In 1862, the mill would change hands to Ralph Sprague and burn down in 1869. James Rea would go on to rebuild the mill in 1871, and Joseph Cole would operate it. Daniel Webster bought it in 1882, and sold it to P.T. Winney in 1889. The mill would not change hands again until June 1914, when George Brake and Fred Mitchell purchased it. According to Mr. Brake, the south half of the dam was built in 1913, with the remaining half finished in 1916. The dam is constructed of concrete and is 225 ft (69 m) long and 9 ft (2.7 m) high.

The first bridge to be built was of open design with wood rails and piers. While crossing the first bridge Owen Wimmer and his family were dropped into the mill pond along with their wagon and team when the bridge fell in. J.H. Kerr and others were able to rescue them. A second bridge of similar construction was erected at the same site. This bridge fell in also just after J.H. Kerr had driven cattle across. The covered bridge was then built in 1868, at the same location, just above the mill dam, with the abutments attached to the dam structure.

Three people submitted bids in 1868, for the contract to build the bridge, these bids would include three different styles of bridges. One bid was from a Mr. Epperson using an Howe Plan for $16,000. Wheelock and McCoy submitted two plans, one was to use a Burr Plan for $17,400 and the second using a Smith Plan for $10,200. Ultimately the bid was awarded to J. J. Daniels and his Burr Plan for $10,200. The "Daniels Portals" were to be later squared off and, after the bridge's closing in 1967, to traffic, benches and steps were added at the portals.

The present mill has been converted to run on electric power. Robert Weis and the Weis Milling Company operated the mill until 1995 when it was purchased by Mike Roe. The current owner has restored the mill and produces over 20 different milled products.

The bridge was destroyed by arson on April 28, 2005. Jesse Payne was taken into custody near the Mansfield Covered Bridge a short time later. He is suspected of burning the Jeffries Ford Covered Bridge also and attempted arson of the Mansfield Covered Bridge. Due to his mental state, he is being detained at the Logansport State Hospital until he is found fit to stand trial.

== Second bridge ==
The second Bridgeton covered bridge was built in 2006 by local citizens and the state of Indiana.

== Gallery ==
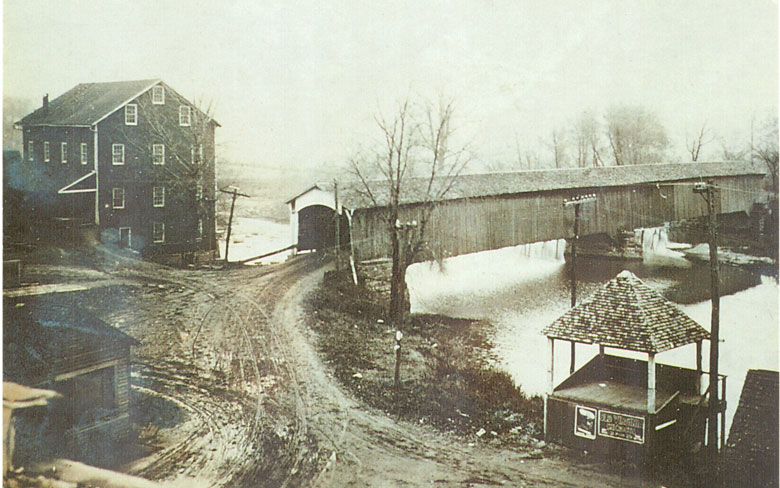
Original Bridgeton Bridge 1900

== See also ==
- List of Registered Historic Places in Indiana
- Parke County Covered Bridges
- Bridgeton, Indiana
- Bridgeton Historic District
- Parke County Covered Bridge Festival
