= Diamond, Indiana =

Unincorporated community in Indiana, United States

- Unincorporated community
- Parke County's location in Indiana

- Location in Parke County
- Coordinates: 39°36′41″N 87°09′58″W
- Country: United States
- State: Indiana
- County: Parke
- Township: Raccoon
- Elevation: 636 ft (194 m)
- Time zone: UTC-5 (Eastern (EST))
  - Summer (DST): UTC-4 (EDT)
- ZIP code: 47874
- Area code: 765
- GNIS feature ID: 433527

Diamond, also known as Caseyville, is an unincorporated community in southern Raccoon Township, Parke County, in the U.S. state of Indiana.

== History ==
Diamond was platted in 1893 as a coal town. The community's name alludes to the diamond-shaped deposits of coal.
