= Conley's Ford Covered Bridge =

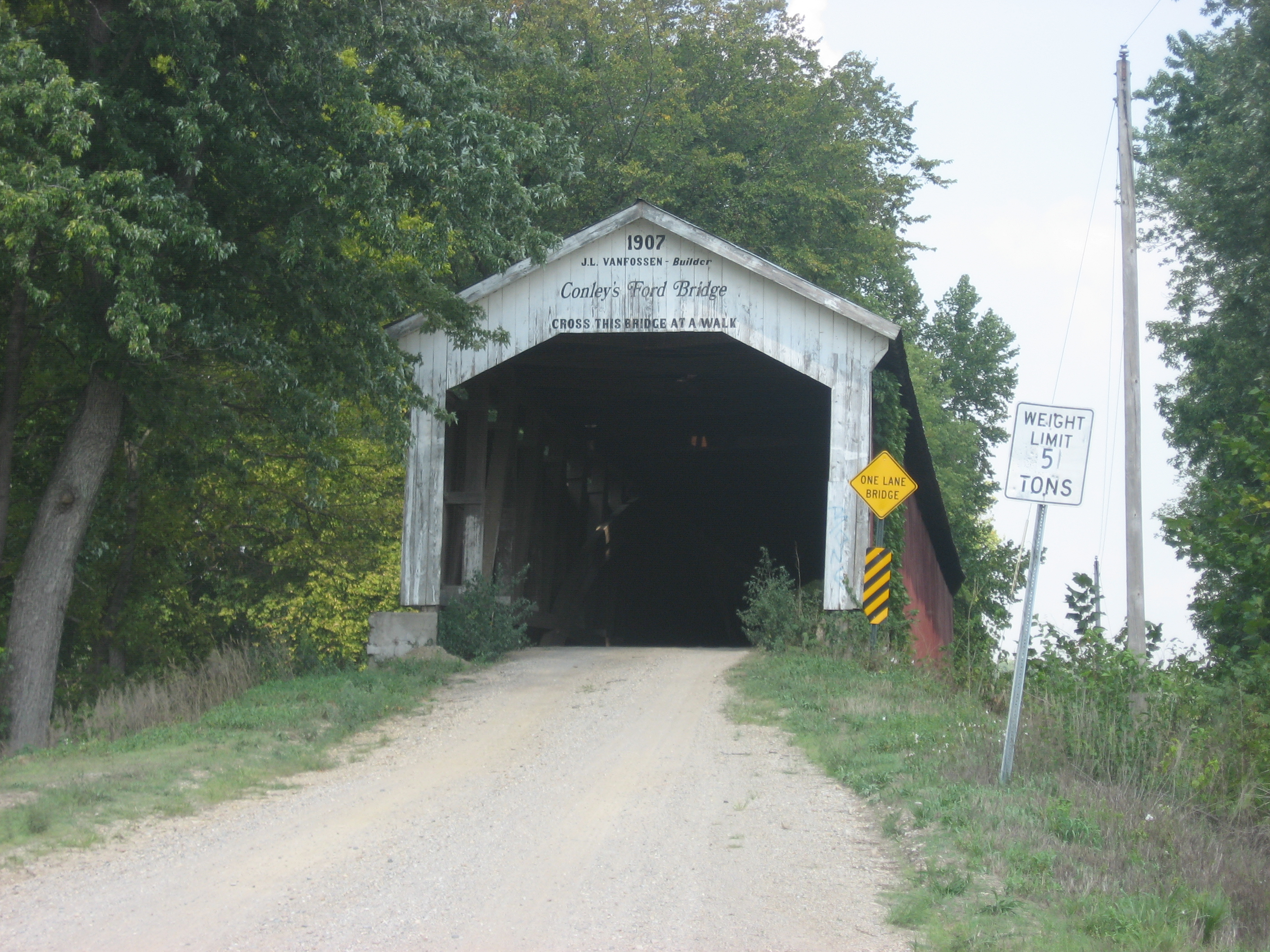
- Conley's Ford Covered Bridge
- Coordinates: 39°39′33.8″N 87°7′58.7″W
- Carries: County Road 550 E.
- Crosses: Big Raccoon Creek
- Locale: Raccoon Township, Parke County, Indiana
- Official name: Conley's Ford Bridge
- Named for: Conley's Ford
- Maintained by: Parke County
- WGCB #: 14-61-02

Characteristics
- Design: Double Burr arch truss bridge
- Material: Concrete (foundations)
- Trough construction: Wood
- Total length: 212 ft (64.6 m) (includes 10 ft (3.0 m) overhangs on each end)
- Width: 16 ft (4.9 m)
- Longest span: 192 ft (58.5 m)
- No. of spans: 1
- Load limit: 5 short tons (4.5 t; 10,000 lb)
- Clearance above: 13 ft (4.0 m)
- Conley's Ford Covered Bridge (#7)
- U.S. National Register of Historic Places
- U.S. Historic district – Contributing property
- Location within Parke County, Indiana Location within Indiana Location within the United States
- Built: 1906–1907
- Built by: J. L. Van Fossen
- Website: Conley's Ford Bridge
- Part of: Parke County Covered Bridges TR (ID64000193)
- NRHP reference No.: 78000388
- Added to NRHP: December 22, 1978

Location
- Interactive map of Conley's Ford Covered Bridge

Conley's Ford Covered Bridge was built in 1906 and crosses Big Raccoon Creek on County Road 550 East close to County Road 720 South, in Raccoon Township, Parke County, Indiana. The bridge is a single span Burr Arch Truss structure. The Conley's Ford Covered Bridge was built by J. Lawrence Van Fossen.

== History ==
Unlike the other covered bridges in Parke County, Conley's Ford was made of white pine, and not poplar. The bridge also lays claim to being the world's fourth longest single span covered bridge.

It was added to the National Register of Historic Places in 1978.

In 1991 the bridge was re-sided and re-roofed. It also had its "Daniels Portals" converted into "Britton Portals" along with the build date being changed to "1907" from "1906-07". From old photos it is known that commissioners, auditors, treasurer and builder were once included on the portals.

== Gallery ==
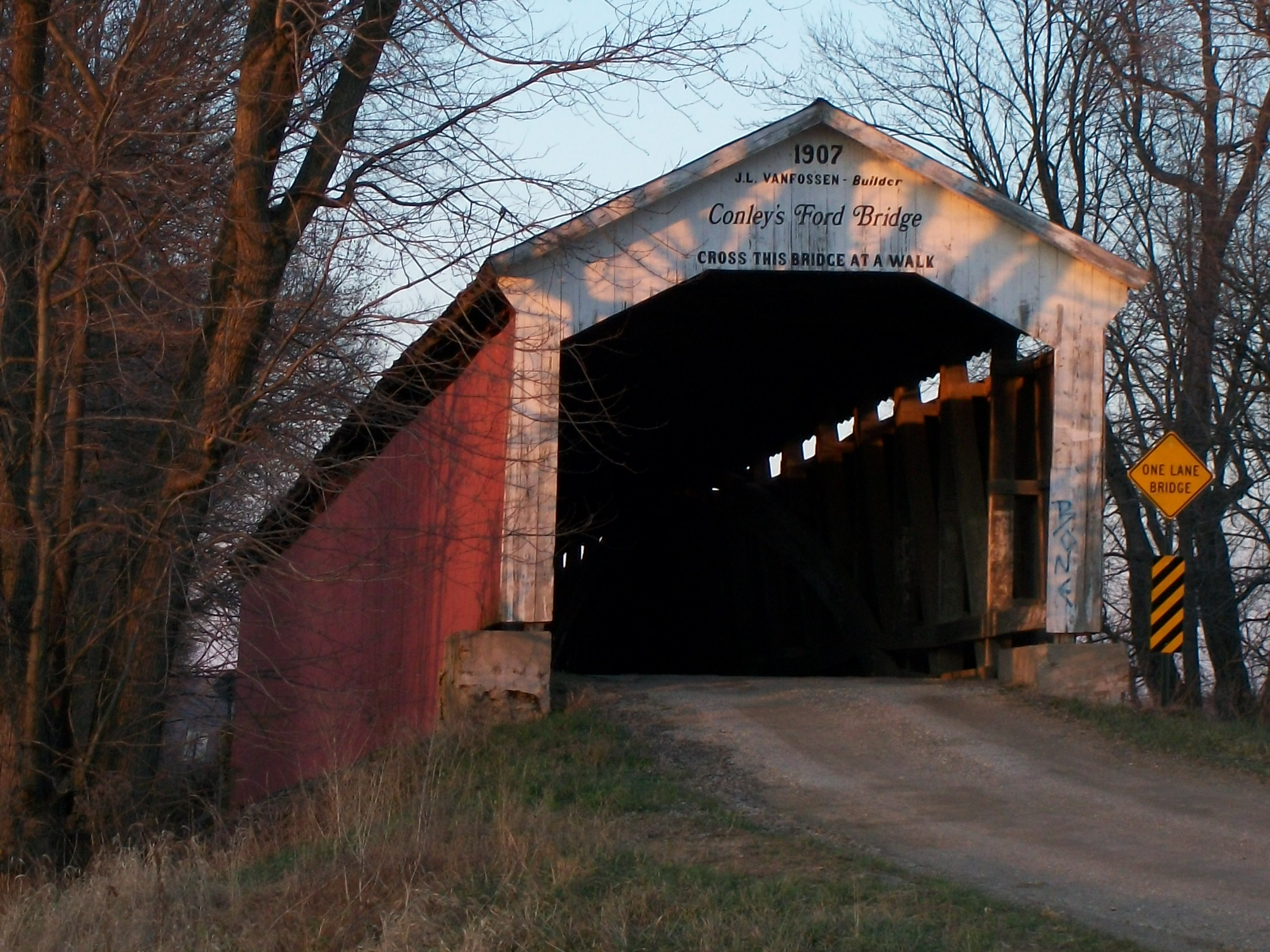

== See also ==
- List of Registered Historic Places in Indiana
- Parke County Covered Bridges
- Parke County Covered Bridge Festival
