= Herman Besse =

American baseball player (1911-1972)

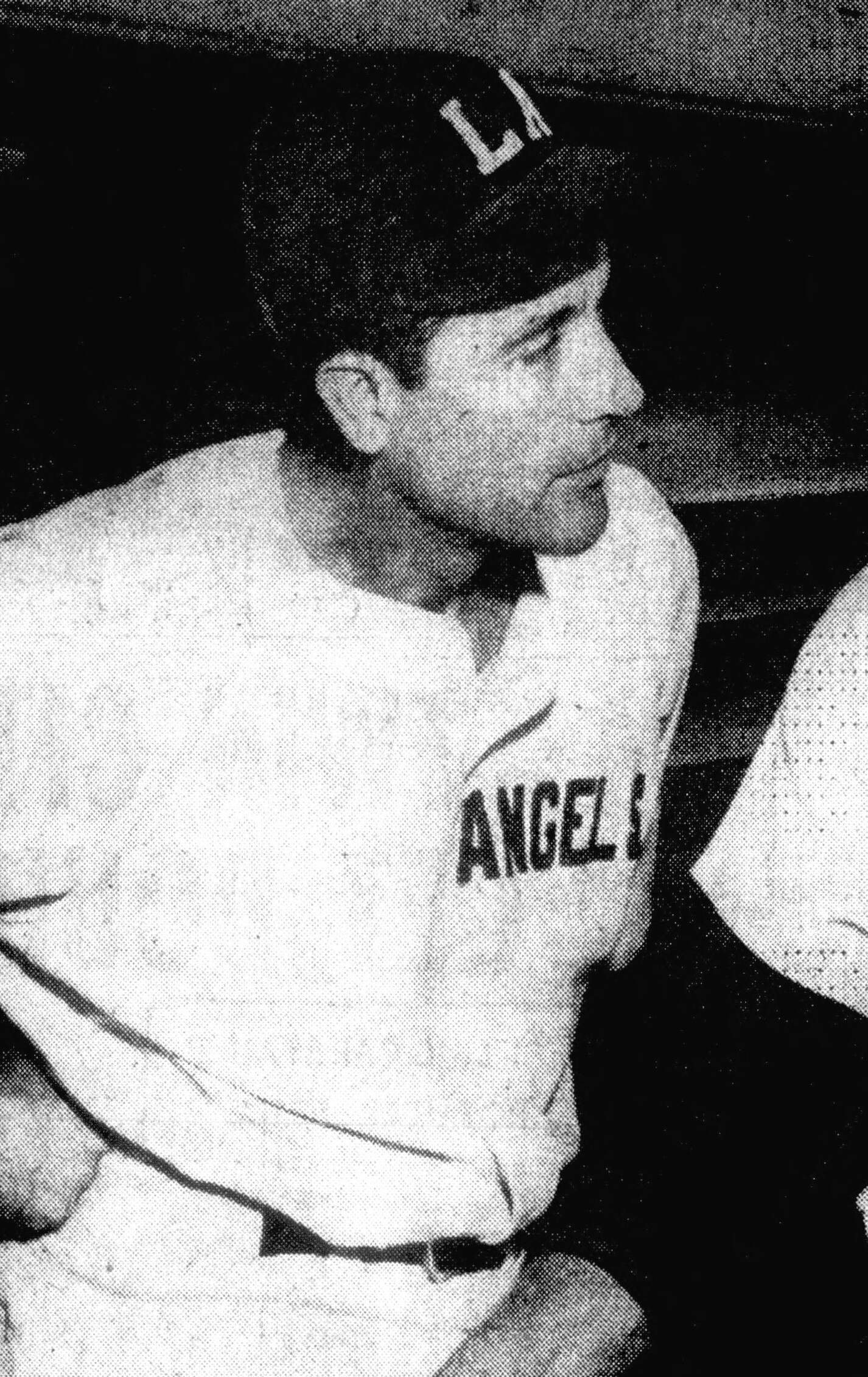
- Besse in 1950
- Pitcher
- Born: August 16, 1911; St. Louis, Missouri, U.S.
- Died: August 13, 1972 (aged 60); Los Angeles, California, U.S.
- Batted: Left Threw: Left

MLB debut
- April 19, 1940, for the Philadelphia Athletics

Last MLB appearance
- May 22, 1946, for the Philadelphia Athletics

MLB statistics
- Win–loss record: 5–15
- Earned run average: 6.79
- Strikeouts: 118
- Stats at Baseball Reference

Teams
- Philadelphia Athletics (1940–1943, 1946)

Herman A. Besse (August 16, 1911 – August 13, 1972) was an American Major League Baseball left-handed pitcher. He played for the Philadelphia Athletics during five seasons, interrupted by service in World War II. After his major league career, Besse moved to Los Angeles and became a newspaper dealer.
