= Bridgeton, Indiana =

Unincorporated community in Indiana, United States

- Unincorporated community and Census-designated place
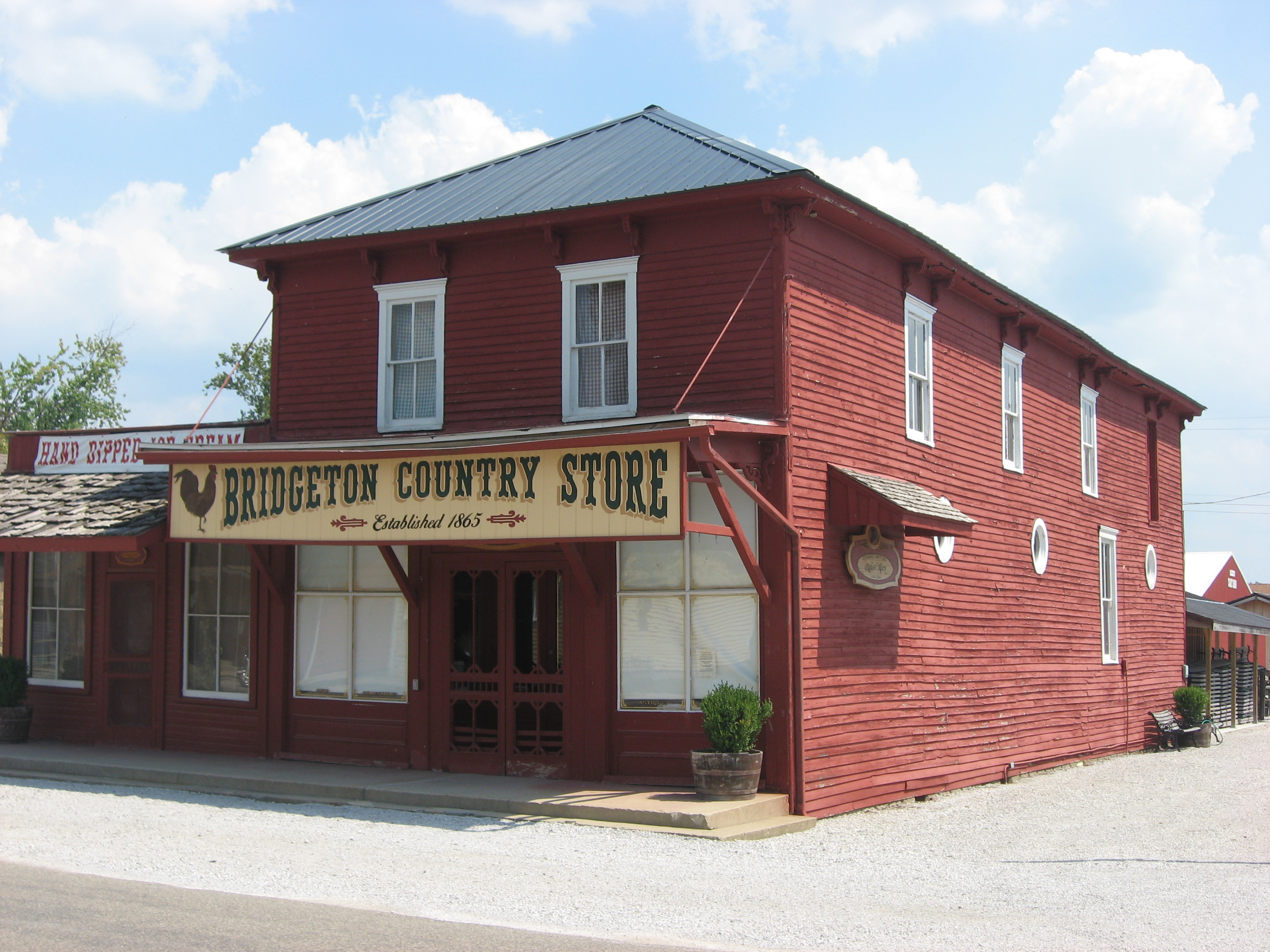
- Bridgeton Country Store est. 1865
- Nicknames: Lockwood Mills, Sodom
- Parke County's location in Indiana

- Location in Parke County
- Coordinates: 39°38′44″N 87°10′35″W
- Country: United States
- State: Indiana
- County: Parke
- Township: Raccoon
- Elevation: 564 ft (172 m)
- Time zone: UTC-5 (Eastern (EST))
  - Summer (DST): UTC-5 (EST)
- ZIP code: 47874
- Area code: 765
- GNIS feature ID: 2830488

Bridgeton is an unincorporated community and census-designated place in Raccoon Township, Parke County, Indiana. It is notable for its covered bridge, which was destroyed on April 28, 2005, by a fire set by an arsonist. A historically accurate reconstruction of the bridge was completed in October, 2006.

== History ==
Around 1823 a sawmill was built on the banks of Big Raccoon creek south of the Ten O'Clock Line by two men, Joseph Lockwood and Issac J. Sillman, for Joseph O'Niel and James Wasson. A buhrstone was added later to grind corn and wheat. Daniel Kalley and a James Searing would later buy the mill in 1837 from James and Mary Wasson for $1,600. Within a few several years a distillery was built but around 1845 the mill and distillery burned down.

Here the story of the mill at Bridgeton splits between two different resources. One is from the Indiana Historical Society and the other is the paperwork submitted to the National Park Services for Bridgeton's application as an Historic District.

The NPR version states that by 1848 the Owsley brothers and William Bean would replace the mill with a hewn log building to fill the need of a local mill. That same year a hewn log bridge was built to span the Big Raccoon Creek giving farmers to the north of town easier access to the mill.

The Indiana Historical Society states that the fall after the mill was destroyed by fire that the townspeople staged a "frolic" to build a new log mill. Searing then sold the mill for $2,000 to James Mullikin and Dr. Henry T. Ketchem. Ketchum soon sold his share back to Searing and in 1851 Mullikin acquired complete ownership of the mill. Mullikin then, sometime before January 1859, tore down the mill and built a new one as well as a general store. Stones were installed for grinding corn as well as stones for wheat. In January 1859 William Beal purchased the mill and surrounding land but sold it to William Blaize in December 1860 for $8,000. In 1862 Ralph Sprauge would acquire the mill.

Sprague and his son-in-law, George W. Phelon, entered into a partnership to run the mill. The partnership was dissolved in 1874 with Sprague continuing to run the mill until he sold it in 1882 to Daniel Webster.

Daniel Webster had been born three miles outside of Bridgeton in 1830. Webster had been a farmer and had made a small fortune in the coal mining business before investing in the mill.

Originally Bridgeton was known as Lockwood Mills for the local mill, but later became known as Sodom because of the drinking and fighting that took place. On Saturday's and public days the mill acted as a community social center with people conducting business and exchanging gossip. For twenty-five cents a gallon of whiskey could be bought and the townsmen would engage in horse races and sometimes fights. The village applied for a post office in 1849 and the name was changed to Bridgeton. The original plat was recorded the same year which included most of the town as it exists today.

== Demographics ==
The United States Census Bureau delineated Bridgeton as a census designated place in the 2022 American Community Survey.

== Bridgeton Historic District ==
- Bridgeton Historic District
- U.S. National Register of Historic Places
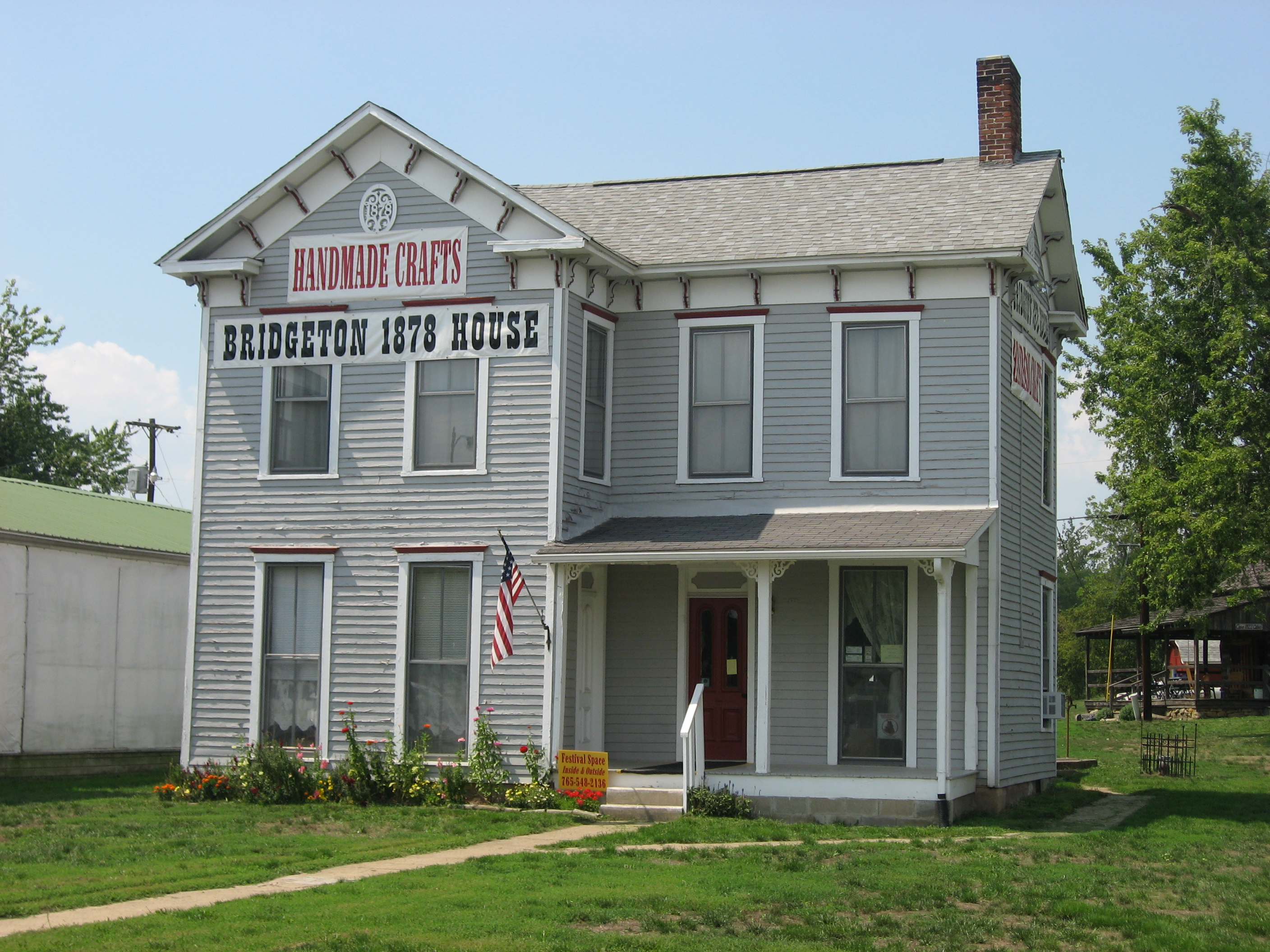
- Sprague-Webster-Kerr House 1878
- Location: Bridgeton, Indiana
- Built: 1823
- Architect: Works Progress Administration; Et al.
- Architectural style: mid-19th Century Revival, Late Victorian, Italianate
- NRHP reference No.: 92001167
- Added to NRHP: September 4, 1992

The Bridgeton Historic District in the city of Bridgeton, Indiana, is "home to the oldest continuously operating mill west of the Allegheny Mountains."

=== Bridgeton Mill ===
Ralph Sprague was a significant figure in Bridgeton's history. He bought the mill in 1862. In 1868, fire claimed this mill as well. Sprague decided to rebuild and the present mill was erected in 1871, it is considered the most historically important building in the district.

The new mill, 1871, was equipped with a large set of burr stones for feed, roller mills for flour, and a small set of burr stones for corn. The total cost was $14,000. With a sandstone foundation and heavy timber frame the mill stands three stories and is capped by a gable roof. Water would enter the basement through large arches in the foundation to power water turbines which would provide mechanical power for the mill.

Daniel Webster bought the mill in 1882 for $15,000 and in 1886 hired the Richmond Milling Company to modernize the mill by replacing the burr stones with more efficient steel roll mills, sieves, and sifters. Under Webster's direction the mill prospered and came to be known as the Bridgeton Roller Mills.

The farmers originally paid for their milling services with 1/6th of their grain, in 1853 a new state law set it at 1/8th. During the Webster period the mill was operated on the exchange system. Farmers would receive 35 pounds of flour per bushel of wheat and forty pounds of meal per bushel of corn. The mill was capable of 75 barrels of flour per day. The Bridgeton Mill used assorted brand names over the years, including, Family, Anchor, White Satin, White Oak, Spring Wheat Patent, and Snowdrift for its flour.

Daniel Webster died in 1895 and about three years later P.T. Winney of Clay County purchased the mill for $3,500. Winney had two 220 volt generators installed and from 1906 until his death in 1913 offered electricity for the town.

George E. Brake, Winney's stepson, and Fred A. Mitchell bought the mill in 1914 for $2,700 and finished reinforcing the dam, started by Winney, with poured concrete. By 1915 Charles Mitchell bought Fred A. Mitchell's interest in the mill but then in 1922 he sold it to Earl D. Miller.

Brake and Miller continued to run the mill until 1935 when Hugh W. Knoll purchased it, but only for a brief period, before selling it to A. Dale Hough for $3,000. Hough had a new foundation laid in the mill and installed a bleaching system for the flour. Charles D. Hansel purchased the mill after Hough died in 1938.

The Bridgeton Mill followed the history of many other mills in Indiana when it was converted to a feed mill in 1938 by its new owner, C.D. Hansel. Hansel had the roll mill and burr stones removed and added a concrete block extension to the south.

In 1940 Ernest and Mildred Weise and their son Robert bought the mill, which they operated as the Weise Milling Company. With the construction of the Mansfield Dam in 1957, and the already declining water level of the Big Raccoon Creek, the Weises converted the mill to an electric powered feed grain operation. A glazed block office was added on east side of the mill. 1969 brought the end of daily operations at the mill though products were still produced and sold to tourists and by mail order year-round. In 1972 the Weises purchased some burr stones from an old mill in New Palestine and reinstalled them at the Bridgeton Mill. The mill was then bought by Mike and Karen Roe in 1995. Along with help, and recipes, from the Weise family, the mill continues to operate today "10 till tired", April 1 through the second weekend of December.

=== Sprague-Webster-Kerr House - "1878 House" ===
Ralph Sprague had this classic gabled ell house built in 1878.(pictured at right) Located on Main Street it is a two-story wood-frame house featuring Italianate ornamentation resting on a sandstone foundation. The house is sheathed in wood clapboard siding and has two gable roof sections. Both the front and side gable ends feature distinctive "1878" oculus vents.

Sprague lived there until he sold the mill, which included the house, in 1882 to Daniel Webster. The Rockville Republican described Mr. Webster as, "one of your fat, jolly old fellows you like to meet." He and his family lived in the house and owned the mill until 1899. In 1899 James H. Kerr purchased the house but after his death it sat empty for many years until Chales Peffley eventually bought it. The house served as a single family residence until 1980 when it was converted into a gift shop. Locally it is known as the "1878 House."

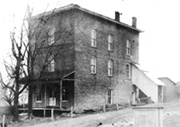
Bridgeton, Indiana, Masonic Lodge prior to the 1913 removal of the 3rd floor.

=== Free & Accepted Masons Lodge 169 ===
In 1869 the Freemasons built a three-story Masonic Lodge across the street from where the present mill would be built. In 1913 the third story was removed (after a fire ravaged the upper story). The Lodge is the oldest building in Bridgeton. It is also one of the last Masonic Moon lodges left in the country. Because of poor roads and traveling conditions meetings were held on the night of the full moon, or within a few days before or after the full moon, to make travel safer and easier.

== See also ==
- List of Registered Historic Places in Indiana
- Parke County Covered Bridges
- Parke County Covered Bridge Festival
- Bridgeton Covered Bridge
