= Appalachian League Hall of Fame =

Coordinates: 35.907161°N 79.022105°W

- Established: 2019
- Type: Professional sports hall of fame
- Website: Official website

The Appalachian League League Hall of Fame is an American baseball hall of fame which honors players, managers, and executives of the Appalachian League of Minor League Baseball for their accomplishments and/or contributions to the league in playing or administrative roles. The Hall of Fame inducted its first class of seven in 2019. Through the elections for 2025, a total of 54 people have been inducted.

== Table key ==
†	Indicates a member of the National Baseball Hall of Fame and Museum
Year	Indicates the year of induction
Position(s)	Indicates the player's primary playing position(s) or association with the league
Team inducted as	Indicates the team for which the individual has been recognized

== Inductees ==
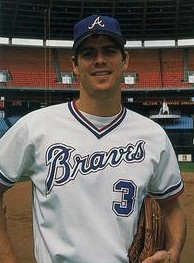
Dale Murphy played catcher for the Kingsport Braves in 1974.

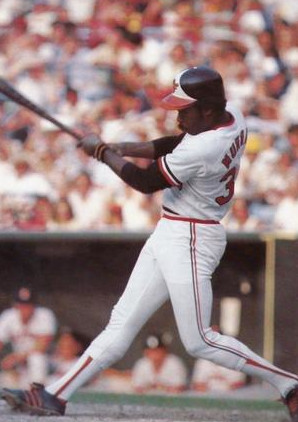
Eddie Murray played first base for the Bluefield Orioles in 1973.

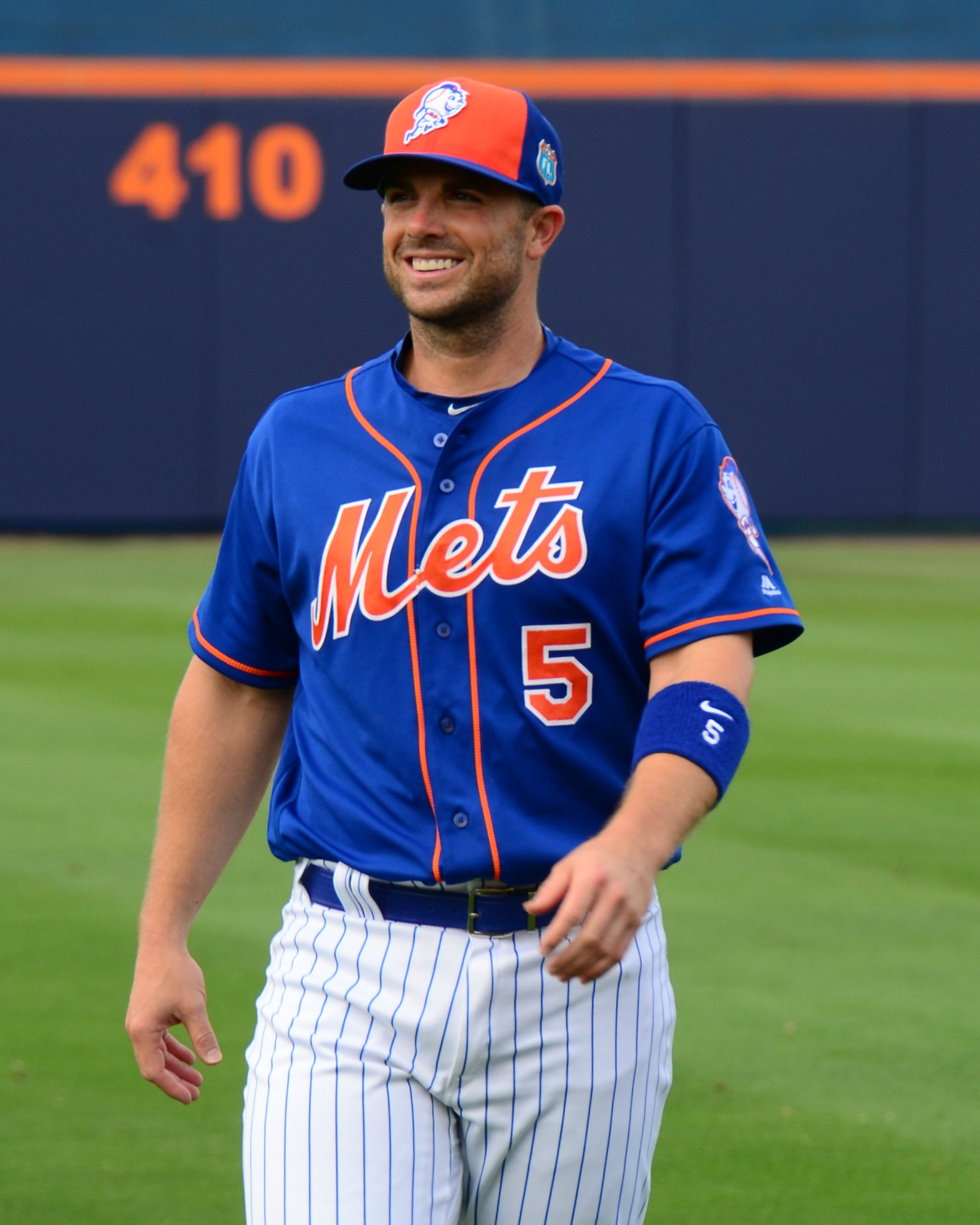
David Wright played third base for the Kingsport Mets in 2001.

Year	Name	Position(s)	Team inducted as
2024	Dale Alexander	First baseman	Greeneville Burley Cubs
2020	Rick Ankiel	Designated hitter/Pitcher	Johnson City Cardinals
2023	Bruce Bochy	Manager	Covington Astros
2019	Randy Boyd	Team operator	Johnson City Cardinals
2021	Orlando Cepeda	First baseman	Salem Rebels
2019	Boyce Cox	Team executive	Bristol White Sox
2021	Dotty Cox	Team executive	Bristol White Sox
2019	Chauncey DeVault	League president	Appalachian League
2020	George E Fanning	Team executive	Bluefield Orioles
2019	Bobby Floyd	Manager	Kingsport Mets
2020	Dale Ford	Umpire	Appalachian League
2020	Bobby Grich	Shortstop	Bluefield Orioles
2020	Ron Guidry	Pitcher	Johnson City Yankees
2019	David Hagan	Team executive	Pulaski Yankees
2019	Bill Halstead	League president	Appalachian League
2019	Jim Holland	Team executive	Princeton Rays
2025	Dennis Holmberg	Manager	Bluefield Blue Jays
2020	Lenny Johnston	Coach	Bluefield Orioles
2019	Andruw Jones	Outfielder	Danville Braves
2020	David Justice	Outfielder	Pulaski Braves
2019	Lee Landers	League president	Appalachian League
2022	Jim Leyland^{†}	Manager	Bristol Tigers
2021	Mahlon Luttrell	Team president	Bristol State Liners
2019	Greg Maddux^{†}	Pitcher	Pikeville Cubs
2020	Harold Mains	Team executive	Elizabethton Twins
2020	Mike Mains	Team executive	Elizabethton Twins
2023	Charlie Manuel	Outfielder	Wytheville Twins
2021	Joe Mauer^{†}	Catcher	Elizabethton Twins
2019	George McGonagle	Team executive	Bluefield Blue Jays
2025	Yadier Molina	Catcher	Johnson City Cardinals
2020	Don Moushon	Team executive	Burlington Royals
2020	Dale Murphy	Catcher	Kingsport Braves
2019	Eddie Murray^{†}	First baseman	Bluefield Orioles
2021	Ron Necciai	Pitcher	Bristol Twins
2019	Scott Niswonger	Investor	Greeneville Astros
2020	Tony Oliva	Outfielder	Wytheville Twins
2023	Boog Powell	Outfielder	Bluefield Orioles
2019	Kirby Puckett^{†}	Outfielder	Elizabethton Twins
2020	Jim Rantz	League executive	Appalachian League
2019	Cal Ripken Jr.^{†}	Shortstop	Bluefield Orioles
2020	Scott Rolen	Third baseman	Martinsville Phillies
2021	Jimmy Rollins	Shortstop	Martinsville Phillies
2019	Nolan Ryan^{†}	Pitcher	Marion Mets
2022	CC Sabathia^{†}	Pitcher	Burlington Indians
2020	Jim Saul	Manager/Coach	Danville Braves/Bluefield Orioles
2020	Mike Shildt	Manager	Johnson City Cardinals
2019	Ray Smith	Manager	Elizabethton Twins
2024	Brian Snitker	Catcher/Manager	Kingsport Braves/Danville Braves
2023	Darryl Strawberry	Outfielder	Kingsport Mets
2019	Jim Thome^{†}	Third baseman	Burlington Indians
2019	Alan Trammell^{†}	Shortstop	Bristol Tigers
2020	Lou Whitaker	Third baseman	Bristol Tigers
2019	Miles Wolff	Team executive	Burlington Royals
2020	David Wright	Third baseman	Kingsport Mets
