= Wytheville Cardinals =

- 1957–1959; (1957–1965, 1967, 1969, 1971–1973); Wytheville, Virginia

Minor league affiliations
- Class: Class D (1957–1962); Rookie (1963–1965, 1967, 1969, 1971–1973)
- League: Appalachian League (1957–1965, 1967, 1969, 1971–1973)

Major league affiliations
- Team: St. Louis Cardinals; Washington Senators (1960); Minnesota Twins (1961–1963); Kansas City Athletics (1964); Washington Senators (1965, 1969); Cincinnati Reds (1967); Atlanta Braves (1971–1973)

Minor league titles
- League titles (1): 1960

Team data
- Name: Wytheville Cardinals (1957–1959); Wytheville Senators (1960); Wytheville Twins (1961–1963); Wytheville A's (1964); Wytheville Senators (1965); Wytheville Reds (1967); Wytheville Senators (1969); Wytheville Braves (1971–1973)
- Ballpark: Withers Field (1957–1965, 1967, 1969, 1971–1973)

The Wytheville Cardinals were a minor league baseball team based in Wytheville, Virginia, United States. From 1957 to 1959, the "Cardinals" played as members of the Class D level Appalachian League, serving as a minor league affiliate of their namesake, the St. Louis Cardinals.

Following The Cardinals, Wytheville continued play in the Appalachian League through the 1973 season, as the franchise played as a minor league affiliate of the Washington Senators (1960), Minnesota Twins (1961–1963), Kansas City Athletics (1964), Washington Senators (1965, 1968), Cincinnati Reds (1967) and Atlanta Braves (1971–1973), adopting the affiliate team nickname in those seasons. The Wytheville Senators won the Appalachian League championship in 1960.

The Wytheville teams all hosted home minor league games at Withers Field in Wytheville, which is still in use today as a public park, known as Withers Park.

Baseball Hall of Fame member Tony Oliva played for the Wytheville Twins in 1961, hitting .410 in his first professional season.

== History ==
Minor league baseball was first hosted in Wytheville, Virginia in 1948, when the Wytheville Pioneers became as members of the six–team Class D level Blue Ridge League. Wytheville played in the 1949 Blue Ridge League season as the Wytheville Statesmen, before the team moved into the Appalachian League in 1950. The Statesmen played in the Appalachian League through the 1955 season.

After the Appalachian League did not play in 1956, the Wytheville "Cardinals" returned to the reformed Class D level Appalachian League in 1957, aa the franchise became a minor league affiliate of the St. Louis Cardinals. The Bluefield Dodgers (Brooklyn Dodgers affiliate), Johnson City Phillies (Philadelphia Phillies), Kingsport Orioles (Baltimore Orioles), Pulaski Cubs (Chicago Cubs) and Salem Rebels (Pittsburgh Pirates) teams joined Wytheville in beginning league play on June 25, 1957. The league was a structured as a short season league, ending play on September 2, 1957, with no playoffs.

Johnny Grodzicki was the Wytheville Cardinals' manager in their first season of play after returning to the Appalachian League. Grodzicki's professional baseball playing career was interrupted by four years of military service during World War II. Grodzicki served in the United States Army's 17th Airborne Division as a paratrooper. In combat in Germany on March 29, 1945, Grodzicki sustained shrapnel wounds to both legs and was awarded a Purple Heart. Grodzicki's injuries required surgery and extensive rehabilitation and he was able to play baseball again before becoming a minor league coach and manager. Grodzicki managed for the St, Louis Cardinals' minor league affiliates and served as scouted for the Cardinals. He then served as a minor league instructor for the Detroit Tigers for over a dozen years. In 1979, he served as the Detroit Tigers' pitching coach.

On August 17, 1957, Wytheville defeated the Kingsport Orioles in Appalachian League play. In the game, Kingsport pitcher Steve Dalkowski walked 21 Cardinals batters and threw 6 wild pitches as Wytheville won the game by the score of 7–6.

In returning the Appalachian League, the Wytheville Cardinals placed fourth in their first season in the reformed six -team league. With a record of 32–28, playing under manager Johnny Grodzicki, Wytheville finished 16.5 games behind the first place Bluefield Dodgers. Wytheville led the league in attendance, drawing 26,027 home fans for the season. Ken Clark of Wytheville hit 11 home runs to lead the Appalachian League.

Whitey Kurowski became the Wytheville Cardinals' manager in 1958. In a successful baseball career, Kurowski overcame childhood osteomyelitis that eventually caused part of a bone on his right forearm to be surgically removed. As a player, Kurowski was an MLB All-Star during five consecutive seasons beginning in 1943. After retiring as a player following the 1949 season, Kurowski coached and managed in the minor leagues for 18 years through the 1972 season.

The 1958 Wytheville Cardinals placed second in the five-team Appalachian League. The Cardinals ended the regular season with a 44–28 record, finishing 3.5 games behind the first place Johnson City Phillies, while playing under manager Whitey Kurowski. Wytheville led the league in attendance for the second straight season, drawing 26,198.

In their final season as a St. Louis Cardinals affiliate, the 1959 Wytheville Cardinals placed fifth in the Appalachian League standings. As the league played with six teams, the Cardinals ended the 1959 season with a record of 29–37 record. Playing under manager Don Pries, Wytheville finished 11.0 games behind the first place Morristown Cubs in the final standings.

=== 1960 to 1969 - championship & five affiliates ===
In 1960, the team became an affiliate of the Washington Senators and won the Appalachian League championship as the Wytheville "Senators." Manager Del "Red" Norwood began a four-season tenure as the Wytheville manager. The Senators ended the season with a record of 43–27, to ende the season in first place in the final regular season standings. Wytheville finished 5.0 games ahead of the second place Kingsport Pirates in the six-team league as no playoffs were held. Joey Gritts of Wytheville hit 24 home runs and had 60 RBI to lead the Appalachian League in both categories. Gerald Cassidy of Wytheville led the league with 65 runs scored. Senators' pitcher Vern Merrick had a league best 2.59 ERA.

Future actor Paul Gleason played for Wytheville in 1960, in his final professional baseball season at age 21. Following his baseball career, Gleason became a long time Hollywood actor and producer, best known for his memorable acting role in the teenage comedy The Breakfast Club and a long-time role in the soap opera All My Children.

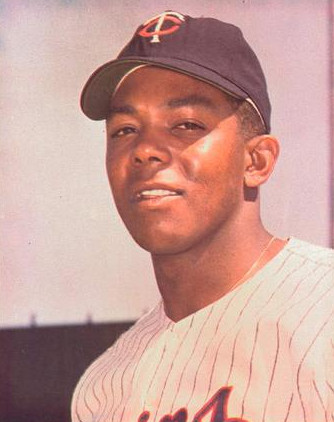
(1965) Baseball Hall of Fame member Tony Oliva, Minnesota Twins. Oliva made his professional debut with the Wytheville Twins in 1961 and won the Appalachian League batting title, hitting .410.

In 1961, the Washington major league franchise moved to become the Minnesota Twins and Wytheville remained an affiliate and became known as the "Twins," with a hall of famer on their roster. A native of Cuba, the Twins signed and assigned Baseball Hall of Fame member Tony Oliva to the Wytheville Twins in the Appalachian League. Oliva played in 64 games for Wytheville and won the league batting championship. Oliva was signed by scout Joe Cambria prior to the 1961 Appalachian League season. Oliva then used his brother Antonio’s passport to leave Cuba and became known as “Tony”, which replaced his real name of Pedro. Tony Oliva would make his major debut with the Minnesota Twins in 1962.

In the 1961 Appalachian League standings, Wytheville finished as the league runner-up. Playing under returning manager Del "Red" Norwood, the Wytheville Twins ended the season with a record of 38–29, finishing in second place, 1.5 games behind the first place Middlesboro Senators in the six-team league. Tony Oliva led the Appalachian league with a .410 average and 81 RBI. His 102 total hits also led the league.

Frank Quilici played for the 1961 Wytheville Twins. After playing for the Minnesota Twins through 1970, in 1971, Quilici was named to manager Bill Rigney's coaching staff on the Minnesota Twins, replacing Sherry Robertson who had been killed in an automobile accident. Quilici was named as a coach and was to be used as a player if needed. On July 6, 1972, Quilici was named to replace the fired Rigney as the Minnesota Twins manager. At age 33, Quilici was the youngest manager in the major leagues at the time. The Twins finished 41–43 under Quilici in 1972 in the first of three straight third-place finishes, which included 81–81 in 1973 and 82–80 in 1974. After the Twins ended the season with fourth place with a 76–83 record in 1975, Quilici was fired after the last game of the season, a 6–4 loss to the Chicago White Sox at Metropolitan Stadium on September 28, 1975. Gene Mauch was hired to replace Quilici. Quilici remained in the Twins' organization, serving as a radio commentator on the team's broadcasts through 1987.

Continuing play in the 1962 Class D level Appalachian League, the Wytheville Twins again placed second, playing the season under returning manager Red Norwood. The Wytheville Twins ended the season with a final record of 40–30. With their second-place finish, the Twins finished 7.0 games behind the first place Bluefield Orioles. The 1962 season was the final season that the Appalachian league played as a Class D level league. Jerry Pritchett of Wytheville led the Appalachian League with both 66 RBI and 86 runs scored. Twins' pitcher Geoff Maloney tied for the league lead with 8 wins on the season. Maloney was signed by the Minnesota Twins out of Queens College. Maloney developed arm troubles that ended his professional career.

The 1963 Appalachian League became classified as a Rookie level league and the Wytheville Twins continued play in the six-team league, managed for the final time by the returning Del Norwood. The Wytheville Twins ended the Appalachian League season with a record of 35–35. The Twins ended the season in third place, finishing 10.5 games behind the first place Bluefield Orioles as the six-team league held no playoffs. Twins' player Matt Szykowny tied for the league lead with 11 home runs. Szkowny had been a three-sport athlete in his collegiate career at the University of Iowa. Szkowny started at quarterback for the 1960 Big Ten champion football team, was a starter on the basketball team that finished second in the 1961 Big 10 season and started for the baseball team that finished second in the Big 10 in 1963. Szkowny was drafted by his hometown Pittsburgh Steelers in the 1963 NFL draft, had a tryout with the Pittsburgh Pirates and then played minor league baseball after signing with the Minnesota Twins organization.

In his first professional season, Reggie Smith played for Wytheville in 1963, having been signed by the Minnesota Twins out of Centennial High School in California. Smith would go on to become a seven-time all-star in the major leagues and played in both the All-star game and world series representing both the American League and National League. Smith was inducted into the Boston Red Sox Hall of Fame in 2000. Smith later became a coach and was on the coaching staff of the 2000 U.S. Olympic baseball team that won the Olympic Gold Medal. Playing for Wytheville in 1963, Smith hit .257 with 8 home runs, 37 RBI and 12 stolen bases playing in 66 games.

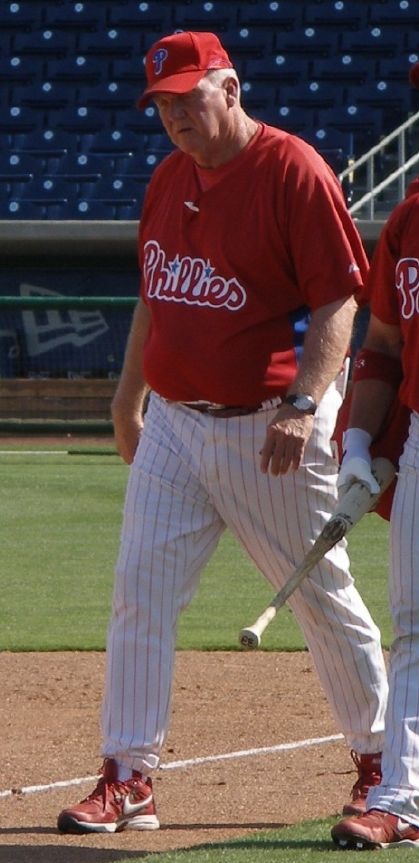
(2008) Charlie Manuel. Manuel played for Wytheville in 1963 in his first professional season. He managed the 2008 World Series Champion Philadelphia Phillies team,

At age 19, Charlie Manuel was a teammate of Smith on the 1963 Wytheville Twins. In the aftermath of his father's suicide in 1963, Manuel turned down college scholarship offers to support his family, signing with the Minnesota Twins and receiving a signing bonus of $20,000. After beginning play with Wytheville, Manuel would send money home to his family during his first professional season. Playing for Wytheville in 1963, Manuel hit .358 with 7 home runs in 58 games. After his playing career ended, Manuel became a minor league manager and then managed both the Cleveland Indians (2000-2002) and Philadelphia Phillies (2005-2015). His 2008 Phillies team won the 2008 World Series and the 2009 Phillies won the National League pennant.

The Wytheville franchise became an affiliate of the Kansas City Athletics for the 1964 Appalachian League season, as the league reduced teams. The Wytheville "A's" ended the season in second place in the final standings. Ending the season with a record of 38–33, Wytheville played the season under the direction of manager Gus Niarhos. With their second-place finish, Wytheville finished 9.0 games behind the first place Johnson City Yankees in the four-team league.

Manager Gus Niarhos had been the bullpen coach for the Kansas City Athletics in the 1962 and 1963 seasons before being named as the Wytheville manager. Niarhos was a former major league catcher who had a lengthy career as a player and as a coach. Niarhos was the starting catcher for the 1949 New York Yankees to begin the season. However, Baseball Hall of Fame member Yogi Berra eventually became the starter in his rookie season.

A three-time world series champion with the Oakland A's and a three-time MLB All-Star, Joe Rudi made his professional debut with the 1964 Wytheville A's at age 17. Rudi was signed by the Kansas City A's out of high school in Modesto, California despite Rudi having suffered a broken hand that spring. on June 13, 1964, Rudi agreed to terms and was signed by A's scout and former Wytheville manager Don Pries, receiving a $15,000 bonus. Rudi hit .429 with 1 home run and 15 RBI in 8 games with Wytheville, before being promoted to the Class A level Daytona Beach Islanders for the remainer of the season.

In 1965, Wytheville became known as the Wytheville "Senators" played the season as a minor league affiliate of the Washington Senators (Today's Texas Rangers) in expanded the six-team Appalachian League. 38–31, second place 4.5 games behind the first place Salem Rebels in the six-team league. Wytheville was last in the league in attendance, drawing 18.834 for the season. Bob Weigle won the League batting title playing for Wytheville, hitting .363, while A's teammate Dick Hense hot 20 home runs, most in the league. A's pitcher Marvin Tidd had 9 wins to lead the Appalachian League.

In 1966, Wytheville did not field a team in the league as the Appalachian League played the season with five teams without Wytheville. The Marion Mets won the league championship.

Resuming minor league play in 1967, the Wytheville "Reds" played the season as a minor league affiliate of the Cincinnati Reds in rejoining the six-team Appalachian League. The Reds finished in last place in the six-place league. With a record of 24–49, Wytheville played the season under manager Scott Breeden while finishing in sixth place. The Reds finished 16.5 games behind the first place Bluefield Orioles in the final league standings as no playoffs were held. Reds pitcher Dave Tomlin had 7 wins to tie for the league lead.

In the 1968 season, Wytheville did not field a team in the as the Appalachian League reduced from a six-team league to a four-team league for the season. The Marion Mets won the league championship.

Wytheville returned to the 1969 Appalachian League, playing as a minor league affiliate of the Washington Senators. The Appalachian League played the 1969 season with eight teams, divided into two divisions. The Wytheville Senators ended the season with a record of 31–35. The Senators were managed by Dick Gernert and finished in fourth place in the North Division. The Senators ended the season 7.0 games behind the first place Pulaski Phillies in the four-team division within the eight-team league.

Jeff Burroughs played for the 1969 Wytheville Senators. Burroughs had been selected by the Washington Senators as the first overall pick in the 1969 Major League Baseball draft and played his first professional season with Wytheville. Burroughs an $88,000 signing bonus from Washington and was assigned to play first base when he reported to the Wytheville Senators. At age 18, Burroughs hit .355 with 8 home runs and 48 RBI in 52 games for Wytheville. Burroughs made his major league debut with the Senators on July 20, 1970, at the age of 19. Playing for the Texas Rangers in 1974, Burroughs was named as the 1974 American League Most Valuable Player. Burroughs would have a 16-season major league career.

In the 1970 season, Wytheville did not field a minor league team as the Appalachian League reduced from an eight-team league to a seven-team league for the season.

=== 1971 to 1973 - Wytheville Braves ===
Wytheville returned to play in the 1971 Appalachian League as an Atlanta Braves minor league affiliate. The league was an eight-team league. Wytheville joined the Bluefield Orioles (Baltimore Orioles affiliate), Bristol Tigers (Detroit Tigers) affiliate, Covington Astros (Houston Astros), Johnson City Yankees (New York Yankees), Kingsport Royals (Kansas City Royals), Marion Mets New York Mets and Pulaski Phillies (Philadelphia Phillies) in beginning league play on June 23, 1971.

The 1971 Wytheville "Braves" ended the season in fourth place overall and in third place in the North Division of the Appalachian League. Managed by Paul Snyder, Wytheville ended the season with a record of 33–35. The Braves finished 7.5 games behind the first place Bluefield Orioles in the eight-team league. Wytheville's Roger Williams led the Appalachian League with both 82 total hits and 47 runs scored. Braves manager Paul Snyder had a 40-year career with the Braves as a player, manager, scouting director and director of player development. Synder was key figure in building the successful 1990's Atlanta Braves teams.

Roger Cador played for the 1971 Wytheville Braves and later had a storied tenure as a collegiate coach. Cador served as the head baseball coach at Southern from 1985 to 2017, after having been an assistant coach from 1980 to 1984. Cador played had played baseball and graduated from Southern. Cador spearheaded efforts to obtain equipment and develop the baseball facilities for his Southern teams. Cador organized the Urban Invitational baseball tournament, featuring Historically Black Colleges and Universities that has been televised on MLB Network. Cador was appointed by baseball commissioner Bud Selig to be a member of a Major League Baseball task force to improve African-American participation in baseball. In his tenure, Cador's Southern baseball teams won 14 SWAC titles, made 11 NCAA tournament appearances, and captured two black national titles (in 2003 and 2005). Cador had the distinction of having coached the first Golden Spikes Award winner and Dick Howser Trophy to have played at a predominantly black school (Rickie Weeks Jr. in 2003) and his team won the first NCAA Division I tournament game by a historically black school. Cador compiled a record of 913–597–1 at Southern before his retirement following the 2017 season.

In the 1972 Appalachian League, the Wytheville Braves continued play and finished in fourth place in the eight-team league standings. The Braves ended the season with a record of 35–30. Wytheville were managed to their fourth place finish by manager Eddie Haas and ended the season 3.5 games behind the first place Bristol Tigers in the eight-team league. Braves player David Michalec hit 16 home runs to tie for the league lead. Eddie Haas later became manager of the 1985 Atlanta Braves, succeeding hall of famer Joe Torre as the Atlanta manager.

Playing in the 1973 Appalachian League, the Wytheville Braves ended the season in third place as Paul Snyder returned to managed the Braves. With a record of 37–32, third place 15.5 games behind the first place Kingsport Royals in the eight-team league. The franchise was seventh in league attendance, drawing 12,851 for the season.

The team relocated to become the Elizabethton Twins in the 1974 Appalachian League. Wytheville, Virginia would receive another minor league franchise when the 1985 Wytheville Cubs joined the Appalachian League.

== The ballpark ==
The Wytheville teams played home games at "Withers Field." Constructed in 1948, the ballpark hosted all Wytheville minor league teams during its existence. The ballpark was repurposed in 1993 to become a public park, renamed "Withers Park." Its grandstand and brick exterior are still in existence today within the park and a plaque recognizes the home plate location. The park is located at 300 North 4th Street in Wytheville, Virginia.

== Timeline ==
| Year(s) | # Yrs. | Team | Level | League | Affiliate | Ballpark |
|---|---|---|---|---|---|---|
| 1957–1959 | 3 | Wytheville Cardinals | Class D | Appalachian League | St. Louis Cardinals | Withers Field |
| 1960 | 1 | Wytheville Senators | Class D | Appalachian League | Washington Senators | Withers Field |
| 1961–1962 | 2 | Wytheville Twins | Class D | Appalachian League | Minnesota Twins | Withers Field |
| 1963 | 1 | Wytheville Twins | Rookie | Appalachian League | Minnesota Twins | Withers Field |
| 1964 | 1 | Wytheville A's | Rookie | Appalachian League | Kansas City Athletics | Withers Field |
| 1965 | 1 | Wytheville Senators | Rookie | Appalachian League | Washington Senators | Withers Field |
| 1967 | 1 | Wytheville Reds | Rookie | Appalachian League | Cincinnati Reds | Withers Field |
| 1969 | 1 | Wytheville Senators | Rookie | Appalachian League | Washington Senators | Withers Field |
| 1971–1973 | 3 | Wytheville Braves | Rookie | Appalachian League | Atlanta Braves | Withers Field |

== Year–by–year records ==
| Year | Record | Finish | Manager | Playoffs/Notes |
Wytheville Cardinals (Appalachian League)
| 1957 | 32–28 | 4th | Johnny Grodzicki | No playoffs held |
| 1958 | 44–28 | 2nd | Whitey Kurowski | No playoffs held |
| 1959 | 29–37 | 5th | Don Pries | No playoffs held |
Wytheville Senators (Appalachian League)
| 1960 | 43–27 | 1st | Red Norwood | No playoffs held League champions |
Wytheville Twins (Appalachian League)
| 1961 | 38–29 | 2nd | Red Norwood | No playoffs held |
| 1962 | 40–30 | 2nd | Red Norwood | No playoffs held |
| 1963 | 35–35 | 2nd | Red Norwood | No playoffs held |
Wytheville A's (Appalachian League)
| 1964 | 38–33 | 2nd | Gus Niarhos | No playoffs held |
Wytheville Senators (Appalachian League)
| 1965 | 38–31 | 2nd | Lee Anthony | No playoffs held |
Wytheville Reds (Appalachian League)
| 1967 | 24–49 | 6th | Scott Breeden | No playoffs held |
Wytheville Senators (Appalachian League)
| 1969 | 31–35 | 4th | Dick Gernert | North Division; No playoffs held |
Wytheville Braves (Appalachian League)
| 1971 | 33–35 | 4th | Paul Snyder | No playoffs held |
| 1972 | 35–50 | 4th | Eddie Haas | No playoffs held |
| 1973 | 37–32 | 3rd | Paul Snyder | No playoffs held |

== Notable alumni ==
- Tony Oliva (1961), Inducted Baseball Hall of Fame 2022
- Dick Bates (1964)
- Larry Bradford (1973)
- Scott Breeden (1967, MGR)
- Don Buschhorn (1964)
- Jeff Burroughs (1969) 1974 AL M.V.P.
- Roger Cador (1971)
- Pete Cimino (1960)
- Jim Clark (1965)
- Don Collins (1972)
- Taylor Duncan (1971)
- Dick Gernert (1969, MGR)
- Jerry Crider (1962)
- Johnny Grodzicki (1957, MGR)
- Steve Foucault (1969)
- Paul Gleason (1960) Actor
- Bill Gogolewski (1965)
- Julio Gotay (1957)
- Eddie Haas (1972, MGR)
- Jack Hamilton (1957)
- Preston Hanna (1972)
- Terry Harper (1973)
- Tom Kopp (1961)
- Whitey Kurowski (1958, MGR) St. Louis Cardinals Hall of Fame
- Fred Lasher (1960)
- Johnny Lewis (1959)
- Jeoff Long (1959)
- Pete Mackanin (1969)
- Jim Manning (1961)
- Charlie Manuel (1963) Philadelphia Baseball Wall of Fame
- Gene Martin (1969)
- Wayne Minshew (1957)
- Dave Moates (1969)
- Junior Moore (1971)
- Gus Niarhos (1964, MGR)
- Tony Pierce (1964)
- Biff Pocoroba (1971)
- Frank Quilici (1961)
- Pat Rockett (1973)
- Tom Ragland (1969)
- Jim Rantz (1960)
- Gordie Richardson (1957)
- Ellie Rodríguez (1964) 2x MLB All-Star
- Joe Rudi (1964) Athletics Hall of Fame
- John Sanders (1964)
- Jim Saul (1957)
- Reggie Smith (1963) Boston Red Sox Hall of Fame
- Paul Snyder (1971, 1973, MGR)
- Dave Tomlin (1967)
- Ted Uhlaender (1961)
- Bill Whitby (1961)
- Roger Williams (1971)
- Wytheville Cardinals players
- Wytheville Senators players
- Wytheville Twins players
- Wytheville A's players
- Wytheville Reds players
- Wytheville Braves players
