= 2026 Appalachian League season =

96th annual season of the Appalachian League

- League: Appalachian League
- Sport: Baseball
- Defending champions: Bluefield Ridge Runners (2025)
- Duration: June 4 – July 30 (Playoffs: July 31 – August 1)
- Games: 48 (192 games in total)
- Teams: 8
- Season champions: Kingsport Axmen
- Runners-up: Pulaski River Turtles

Appalachian League Championship
- Venue: Calfee Park
- Champions: Kingsport Axmen
- Runners-up: Pulaski River Turtles

Seasons
- ← 2025 2027 →

The 2026 Appalachian League season is the 6th season of collegiate summer baseball in the Appalachian League, a collegiate summer baseball league in the Appalachian regions of Tennessee, Virginia, West Virginia, and North Carolina, since it became a collegiate summer league in 2021. It will be the 96th season overall for the league, including the 90 seasons it served as a professional rookie-level and Class D affiliate league in Minor League Baseball (MiLB).

The Bluefield Ridge Runners entered the season as defending champions, having defeated the Kingsport Axmen in the league's 2025 championship game.

== Season schedule ==
It was announced during the offseason that the Tri-State Coal Cats were folding after only playing two seasons due to challenges coordinating with Marshall University over the use of the facilities at Jack Cook Field.

Also, it was announced that the Bristol State Liners were going on hiatus for the 2026 season due to the uncertainty regarding their future as a franchise surrounding their potential new stadium.

The season will be played with a 48-game schedule, with the regular season starting on June 4 and concluding on July 30. The top two teams in each division will qualify for the playoffs that start on July 31.

== Regular season standings ==
East Division Regular Season Standings
Pos	Team	G	W	L	Pct.	GB
1	Danville Otterbots - X	44	25	19	.568	--
2	Pulaski River Turtles - X	45	25	20	.556	0.5
3	Bluefield Ridge Runners	44	19	25	.432	6.0
4	Burlington Sock Puppets	41	17	24	.415	6.5

West Division Regular Season Standings
Pos	Team	G	W	L	Pct.	GB
1	Kingsport Axmen - X	36	24	12	.667	--
2	Johnson City Doughboys - X	35	18	17	.514	3.5
3	Elizabethton River Riders	35	17	18	.486	4.5
4	Greeneville Flyboys	34	15	19	.441	6.0

- x – Clinched playoff spot

== Statistical leaders ==
=== Hitting ===
Stat	Player	Team	Total
HR	Brandon Novy	Burlington Sock Puppets	9
AVG	Alex Meyers	Bluefield Ridge Runners	.404
RBIs	Deacon Pomeroy	Burlington Sock Puppets	35
SB	Bryce Clavon	Burlington Sock Puppets	19

=== Pitching ===
Stat	Player	Team	Total
W	Tyler Kenast	Danville Otterbots	5
ERA	Diego Gutierrez	Danville Otterbots	1.26
SO	Michael Savarese	Kingsport Axmen	23
SV	PJ Fitzpatrick, Jake Wise	Bluefield Ridge Runners, Pulaski River Turtles	3

== Awards ==
Award	Player	Team
Player of the Year		
Pitcher of the Year		
Manager of the Year		
Organization of the Year	N/A	
Executive of the Year		
Promotional Award of Excellence	N/A	
Community Service Award	N/A	
Humanitarian Award		

== Playoffs ==
=== Format ===
The team with the best winning percentage in each division hosts the team in its division with the second-best winning percentage. The winners will meet in the Appalachian League Championship Game. In even-numbered years, the East Division hosts the game, while in odd-numbered years, the West Division hosts.

=== Playoff bracket ===
Division Championship Round
1	Pulaski River Turtles	4
2	Danville Otterbots	3
↑ East / ↓ West
1	Johnson City Doughboys	2
2	Kingsport Axmen	5

Appalachian League Championship
Kingsport Axmen	8
Pulaski River Turtles	8

== See also ==
- 2026 FCBL season
- 2026 Major League Baseball season
- 2026 Northwoods League season
- 2026 PGCBL season
- 2026 Prospect League season
