= DeVault Memorial Stadium =

Baseball stadium in Bristol, Virginia

Coordinates: 36.601968°N 82.199251°W

DeVault Memorial Stadium is a stadium in Bristol, Virginia. It is primarily used for baseball, and is the home field of Bristol State Liners of the summer collegiate Appalachian League. It was previously home to the Bristol Pirates Minor League Baseball team. it is also home to the Virginia High School baseball team and was the site of their 1981, 1983, 1992, 1993 and 1996 Virginia VHSL state baseball championships. It was built in 1969. It holds 2,000 people.

The stadium is named for Charlton Ross ("Chauncey") DeVault, Sr. (1910–1980), of Bristol, Tennessee. DeVault was President of the Appalachian League from its revival in 1957 until his death in 1980. DeVault Field at Emory & Henry College in Emory, is also named after him.
