= Paul Snyder =

Paul Snyder may refer to:

- Paul Snyder (basketball) (1938–2026), American businessman and owner of the Buffalo Braves basketball team
- Paul Snyder (baseball) (1935–2023), American front-office executive in Major League Baseball
