= Bowen Field =

Bowen Field may refer to:

- Bowen Field at Peters Park, a stadium in Bluefield, Virginia, United States
- Bowen Field (or Chancerelles Airport), a Haitian airport used from 1942 until it was succeeded by the François Duvalier International Airport in 1965
