= Ray Smith (catcher) =

American baseball player (born 1955)

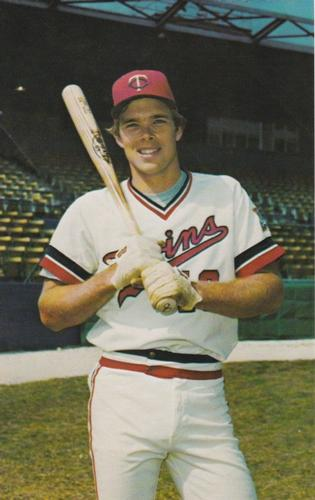
- Catcher
- Born: September 18, 1955 (age 70); Glendale, California, U.S.
- Batted: Right Threw: Right

MLB debut
- April 9, 1981, for the Minnesota Twins

Last MLB appearance
- September 25, 1983, for the Minnesota Twins

MLB statistics
- Batting average: .219
- Home runs: 1
- Runs batted in: 10
- Stats at Baseball Reference

Teams
- Minnesota Twins (1981–1983)

Raymond Edward Smith (born September 18, 1955) is an American professional baseball manager and a former Major League Baseball catcher who appeared in 83 big-league games for the Minnesota Twins from 1981 to 1983.

Smith is the longtime manager of the Twins' Rookie-level farm system affiliate, the Elizabethton Twins of the Appalachian League. In 2017, Smith will spend his 24th season as manager at Elizabethton and his 32nd year overall with the franchise.

Smith attended the University of Oregon. Signed by Minnesota as an amateur free agent in 1977, he made his pro debut that season with Elizabethton, batting .303 in 63 games and earning a promotion to the Class A Visalia Oaks. Smith then climbed the ladder in the Twins' farm system and spent the entire 1981 and 1983 seasons in the Majors, as well as part of 1982, as the Twins' backup catcher. He had 47 hits in 215 at bats, including six doubles and one triple. His lone MLB home run, a solo shot, came off Jerry Don Gleaton of the Seattle Mariners on April 15, 1981. He played in the Twins' system through 1984, then spent one season each in the San Diego Padres and Oakland Athletics organizations before retiring as a player in 1986. He batted and threw right-handed, stood 6 feet 1 inch (1.85 m) tall and weighed 185 pounds (84 kg) during his active career.

In 1987, Smith began his managerial career with the Elizabethton Twins, skippering them for eight consecutive seasons (1987–94). He then stepped down to a coaching role with Elizabethton for seven seasons, serving from 1995 to 2001. In 2002, he resumed the helm as the club's manager, and 2017 marks his 16th consecutive year in that role. In 23 seasons, Smith has compiled a win–loss record of 935–613 (.604), all with Elizabethton. He has won six league championships.

His teams made the playoffs for eight consecutive seasons (2005–12) and Smith has been named the Appalachian League manager of the year on six occasions.

Preceded by Fred Waters; Rudy Hernández	Elizabethton Twins manager 1987–1994; 2002–	Succeeded by John Russell; Incumbent
