= Elizabethton Twins =

- 1974–2020; Elizabethton, Tennessee
Team logo
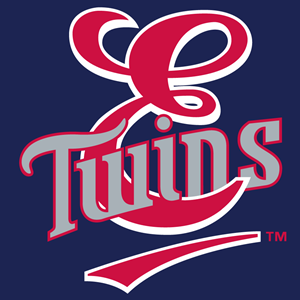
Cap insignia

Minor league affiliations
- Class: Rookie (1974–2020)
- League: Appalachian League (1974–2020)

Major league affiliations
- Team: Minnesota Twins (1974–2020)

Minor league titles
- League titles (12): 1978; 1984; 1989; 1990; 2000; 2003; 2005; 2007; 2008; 2012; 2017; 2018
- Division titles (16): 1984; 1989; 1992; 1993; 2000; 2001; 2003; 2005; 2006; 2007; 2008; 2009; 2012; 2014; 2017; 2018

Team data
- Name: Elizabethton Twins (1974–2020)
- Colors: Navy, scarlet, white, gray
- Ballpark: Northeast Community Credit Union Ballpark (1974–2020)

The Elizabethton Twins were a Minor League Baseball team of the Appalachian League and a Rookie-level affiliate of the Minnesota Twins. They were located in Elizabethton, Tennessee, and were named for their major league affiliate. The team played its home games at Northeast Community Credit Union Ballpark, which opened in 1974.

Over 46 years of competition, the Twins played in 3,113 regular season games and compiled a 1,779–1,333–1 win–loss–tie record. They qualified for the postseason on 19 occasions, winning 16 division titles and 12 Appalachian League championships. Elizabethton won more league championships than any other team in Appalachian League history. They had a postseason record of 33–24. Combining all 3,170 regular season and postseason games, the Twins had an all-time record of 1,812–1,357–1.

== History ==
Professional baseball was first played in Elizabethton, Tennessee, by the Elizabethton Betsy Red Sox in the Appalachian League in 1937. They remained in the league through 1942. The city's Appalachian League entry from 1945 to 1948 was called the Elizabethton Betsy Cubs. They were followed by the Elizabethton Betsy Local from 1949 to 1950 and the Elizabethton Phils in 1951.

Thirty-three years later, the Minnesota Twins placed the Elizabethton Twins in the Appalachian League as a Rookie-level affiliate. Elizabethton played its inaugural game on June 21, 1974, against the Kingsport Braves on the road at the ballpark on the campus of Dobyns-Bennett High School, losing 8–3. The Twins got their first win the next night, defeating Kingsport, also 8–3. Their Riverside Park home opener, scheduled for June 23 against the Bristol Tigers, was rained out. They played their first home game the next evening, losing to Bristol, 15–2. Elizabethton finished its inaugural season in second place with a 41–27–1 record.

Twins pitcher Rubio Malone tossed two no-hitters in 1978. He pitched the first on June 23 in the second game of a doubleheader against the Johnson City Cardinals in a seven-inning 8–1 win. The lone Johnson City run was scored in the first inning when Gotay Mills drew a walk, stole second, advanced to third on an outfield fly ball, and came home on a sacrifice fly. Malone's second no-hit game occurred nearly a month later on July 19, this time in front of a home audience. He held the Bluefield Orioles hitless for nine innings in the 6–0 win. The season was also successful for the Twins as they won their first Appalachian League championship in 1978 with a first-place 41–28 record. Manager Fred Waters, who had been leading the team since 1975, was selected for the Appalachian League Manager of the Year Award. Waters led Elizabethton to its second championship in 1984. They won the Southern Division title with a 40–29 record, then defeated the Pulaski Braves in a one-game playoff for the Appalachian League title. Waters won Manager of the Year honors, as he also had in 1981.

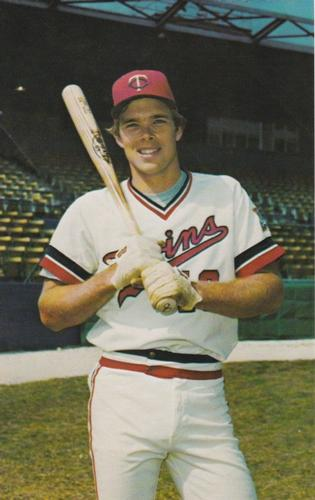
Manager Ray Smith leads the Appalachian League in wins (1,048).

In 1987, Ray Smith replaced Waters as the Twins' manager after 12 years guiding the team. Smith would go on to become the winningest manager in Appalachian League history with 1,048 wins from 1987 to 1994 and 2002 to 2019. He would win a record seven Manager of the Year Awards and lead Elizabethton to nine league championships.

The first two championship seasons under Smith came back-to-back in 1989 and 1990. The 1989 team won the Southern Division and defeated Pulaski, 2–0, in the finals. The 1990 Twins set a franchise record with their 51–16 (.761) season and earned the league crown with a first-place finish. On August 26, 1991, Eddie Guardado pitched a no-hitter versus the Pulaski Braves, 5–0, at Joe O'Brien Field. They missed the playoffs that season but returned in 1992 and 1993 by virtue of winning the Southern Division title, only to lose in the championship finals. Smith was selected for four consecutive Manager of the Year Awards from 1989 to 1992. Another playoff drought occurred from 1994 to 1999, the longest in franchise history.

Over 20 years from 2000 to 2019, the Twins qualified for the postseason 15 times. Jeff Carter, the 2000 season's Manager of the Year, led Elizabethton to the Southern Division title and the franchise's fifth Appalachian League championship. After losing in the finals of 2001 under Manager of the Year Rudy Hernández, Ray Smith returned to lead the team in 2002. He guided the Twins to league titles in 2003, 2005, 2007, 2008, 2012, 2017, and 2018.

On July 16, 2011, pitchers Tim Shibuya (7 IP), Garrett Jewel (1 IP), and Steven Gruver (1 IP) combined to no-hit the Greeneville Astros, 6–0, on the road.

The start of the 2020 season was postponed due to the COVID-19 pandemic before ultimately being cancelled on June 30. In conjunction with a contraction of Minor League Baseball beginning with the 2021 season, the Appalachian League was reorganized as a collegiate summer baseball league, and the Twins were replaced by the Elizabethton River Riders, a new franchise in the revamped league designed for rising college freshmen and sophomores.

== Season-by-season results ==
Table key
League	The team's final position in the league standings
Division	The team's final position in the divisional standings
GB	Games behind the team that finished in first place in the division that season
‡	League champions
†	Division champions
*	Postseason berth

Season-by-season results
Season	Regular season					Postseason			Ref.
Season	Record	Win %	League	Division	GB	Record	Win %	Result	Ref.
1974	41–27–1	.603	2nd	2nd	10 1/2	—	—	Result	—
1975	38–30	.559	2nd	2nd	3	—	—	—	
1976	27–43	.386	7th	3rd	23	—	—	—	
1977	29–40	.420	5th	—	14	—	—	—	
1978 ‡	41–28	.594	1st	—	—	—	—	Won AL championship	
1979	37–33	.529	3rd	—	17 1/2	—	—	—	
1980	32–36	.471	4th	—	13	—	—	—	
1981	42–28	.600	2nd	—	4	—	—	—	
1982	32–36	.471	5th	2nd	1/2	—	—	—	
1983	28–43	.394	7th	—	18 1/2	—	—	—	
1984 ‡ †	40–29	.580	1st	1st	—	1–0	1.000	Won Southern Division title Won AL championship vs. Pulaski Braves, 1–0	
1985	31–40	.437	5th	—	14	—	—	—	
1986	37–31	.544	4th	2nd	8	—	—	—	
1987	29–40	.420	6th	2nd	13	—	—	—	
1988	33–37	.471	6th (tie)	4th	12 1/2	—	—	—	
1989 ‡ †	47–21	.691	1st	1st	—	2–0	1.000	Won Southern Division title Won AL championship vs. Pulaski Braves, 2–0	
1990 ‡	51–16	.761	1st	—	—	—	—	Won AL championship	
1991	39–29	.574	4th	2nd	6	—	—	—	
1992 †	49–17	.742	1st	1st	—	1–2	.333	Won Southern Division title Lost AL championship vs. Bluefield Orioles, 2–1	
1993 †	37–30	.552	4th	1st	—	0–2	.000	Won Southern Division title Lost AL championship vs. Burlington Indians, 2–0	
1994	36–30	.545	4th	2nd	5	—	—	—	
1995	33–31	.516	3rd	2nd	14	—	—	—	
1996	40–27	.597	4th	3rd	8	—	—	—	
1997	38–30	.559	4th	2nd	5	—	—	—	
1998	38–29	.567	2nd	2nd	4 1/2	—	—	—	
1999	40–30	.571	4th	3rd	8 1/2	—	—	—	
2000 ‡ †	46–18	.719	1st	1st	—	2–0	1.000	Won Southern Division title Won AL championship vs. Danville Braves, 2–0	
2001 †	41–22	.651	1st	1st	—	1–2	.333	Won Southern Division title Lost AL championship vs. Bluefield Orioles, 2–1	
2002	37–30	.552	4th	2nd	5 1/2	—	—	—	
2003 ‡ †	42–24	.636	2nd	1st	—	2–1	.667	Won Western Division title Won AL championship vs. Martinsville Astros, 2–1	
2004	38–29	.567	4th	2nd	3	—	—	—	
2005 ‡ †	48–19	.716	1st	1st	—	2–1	.667	Won Western Division title Won AL championship vs. Danville Braves, 2–1	
2006 †	42–26	.618	1st	1st	—	1–2	.333	Won Western Division title Lost AL championship vs. Danville Braves, 2–1	
2007 ‡ †	50–18	.735	1st	1st	—	2–0	1.000	Won Western Division title Won AL championship vs. Danville Braves, 2–0	
2008 ‡ †	41–25	.621	1st	1st	—	2–0	1.000	Won Western Division title Won AL championship vs. Pulaski Mariners, 2–0	
2009 †	45–23	.662	2nd	1st	—	0–2	.000	Won Western Division title Lost AL championship vs. Danville Braves, 2–0	
2010 *	41–25	.621	2nd	2nd	1	2–2	.500	Won semifinals vs. Pulaski Mariners, 2–0; Lost AL championship vs. Johnson City Cardinals, 2–0	
2011 *	42–26	.618	2nd	2nd	3	1–2	.333	Lost semifinals vs. Bluefield Blue Jays, 2–1	
2012 ‡ †	43–22	.662	1st	1st	—	4–2	.667	Won Western Division title Won semifinals vs. Danville Braves, 2–1; Won AL championship vs. Burlington Royals, 2–1	
2013	37–31	.544	5th	3rd	3 1/2	—	—	—	
2014 †	38–30	.559	2nd (tie)	1st	—	1–2	.333	Won Western Division title Lost semifinals vs. Johnson City Cardinals, 2–1	
2015	34–34	.500	5th (tie)	3rd	6	—	—	—	
2016 *	36–31	.537	5th	2nd	2 1/2	1–2	.333	Lost semifinals vs. Johnson City Cardinals, 2–1	
2017 ‡ †	41–27	.603	3rd	1st	—	4–1	.800	Won Western Division title Won semifinals vs. Greeneville Astros, 2–1; Won AL championship vs. Pulaski Yankees, 2–0	
2018 ‡ †	39–27	.591	3rd	1st	—	4–1	.800	Won Western Division title Won semifinals vs. Kingsport Mets, 2–1; Won AL championship vs. Princeton Rays, 2–0	
2019	33–34	.493	7th	4th	1 1/2	—	—	—	
2020	Season cancelled (COVID-19 pandemic)								
Totals	1,779–1,333–1	.572	—	—	—	33–24	.579	—	—

== Achievements ==
=== Awards ===
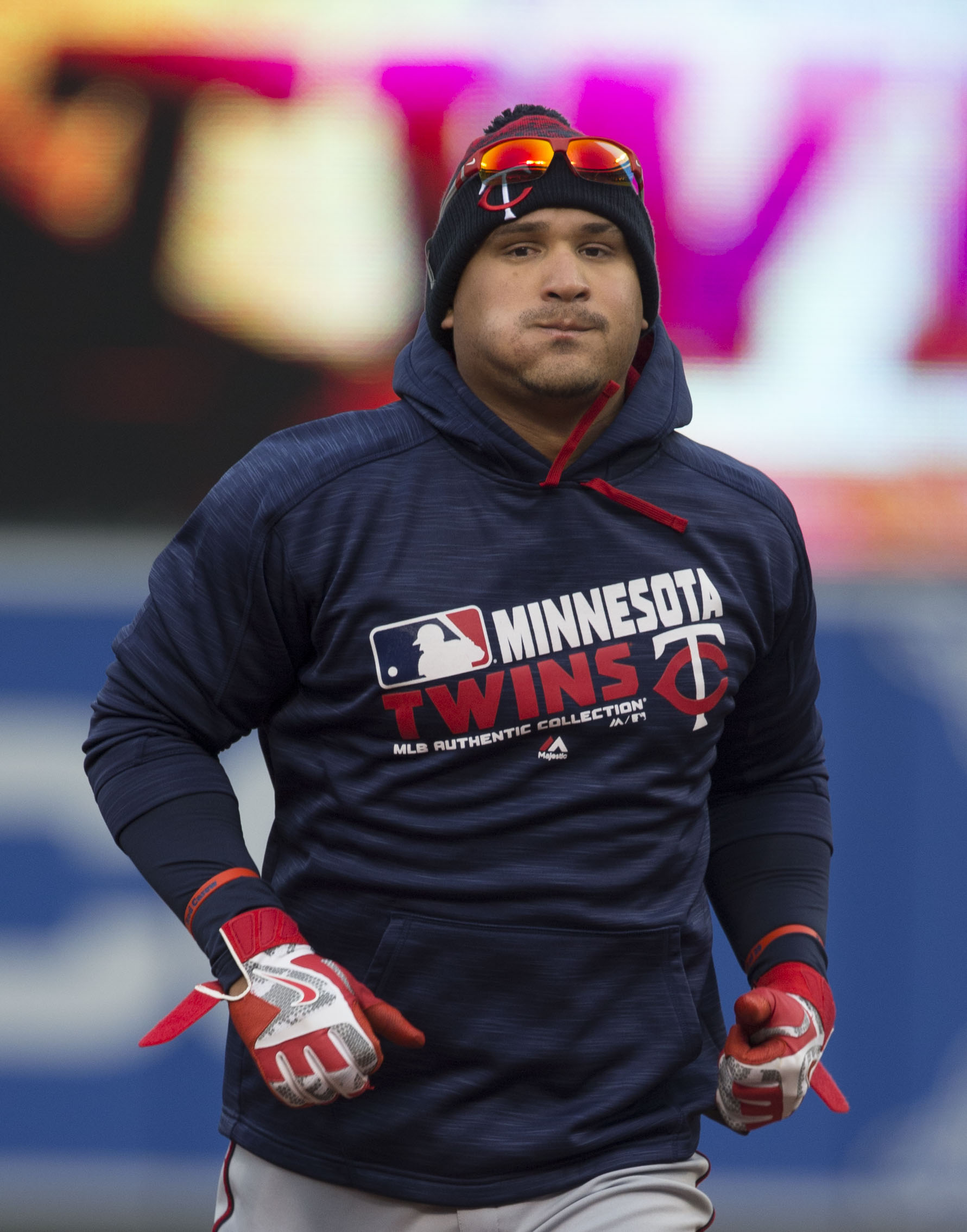
Oswaldo Arcia, 2010 Player of the Year Award winner

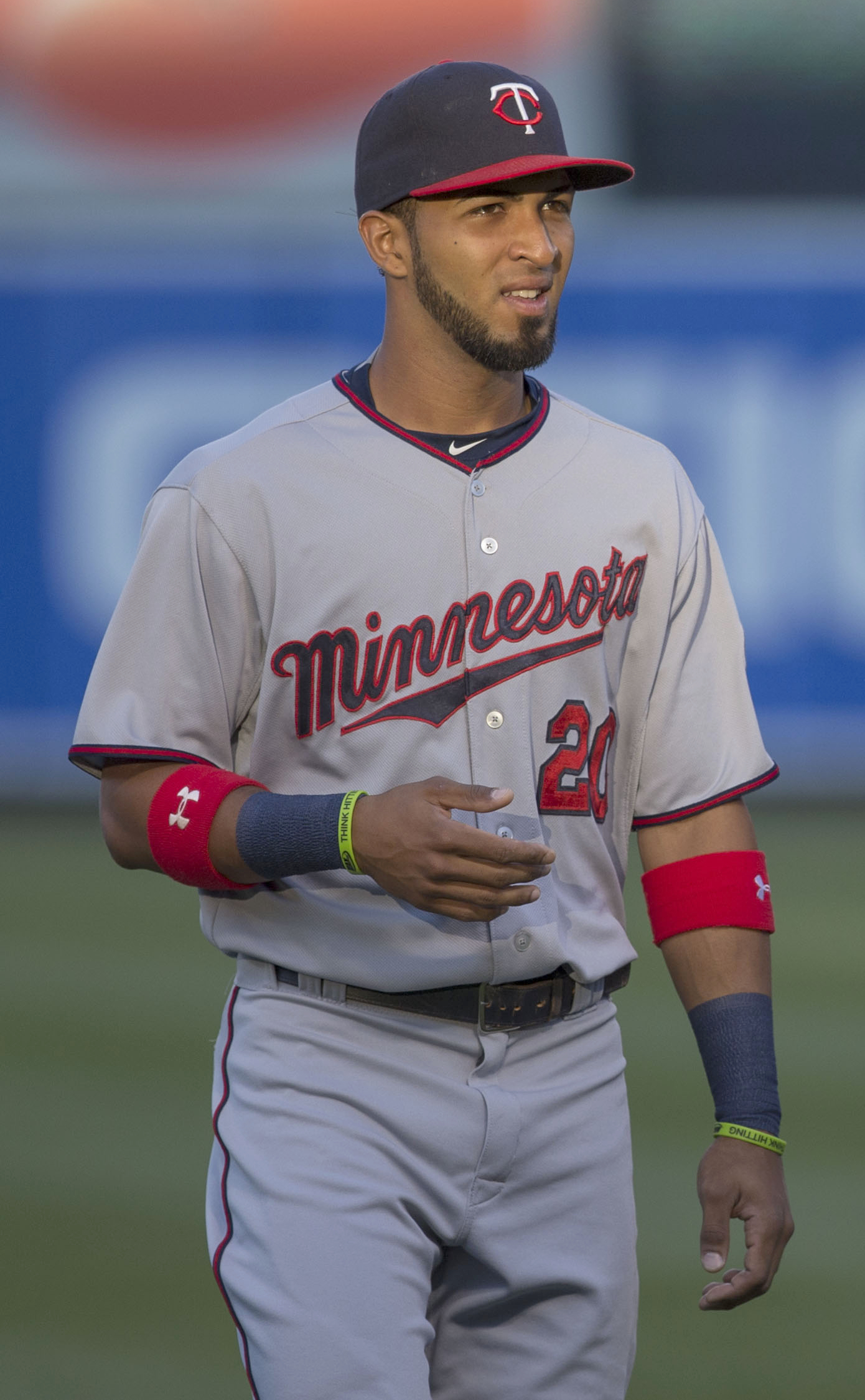
Eddie Rosario, 2011 Player of the Year Award winner

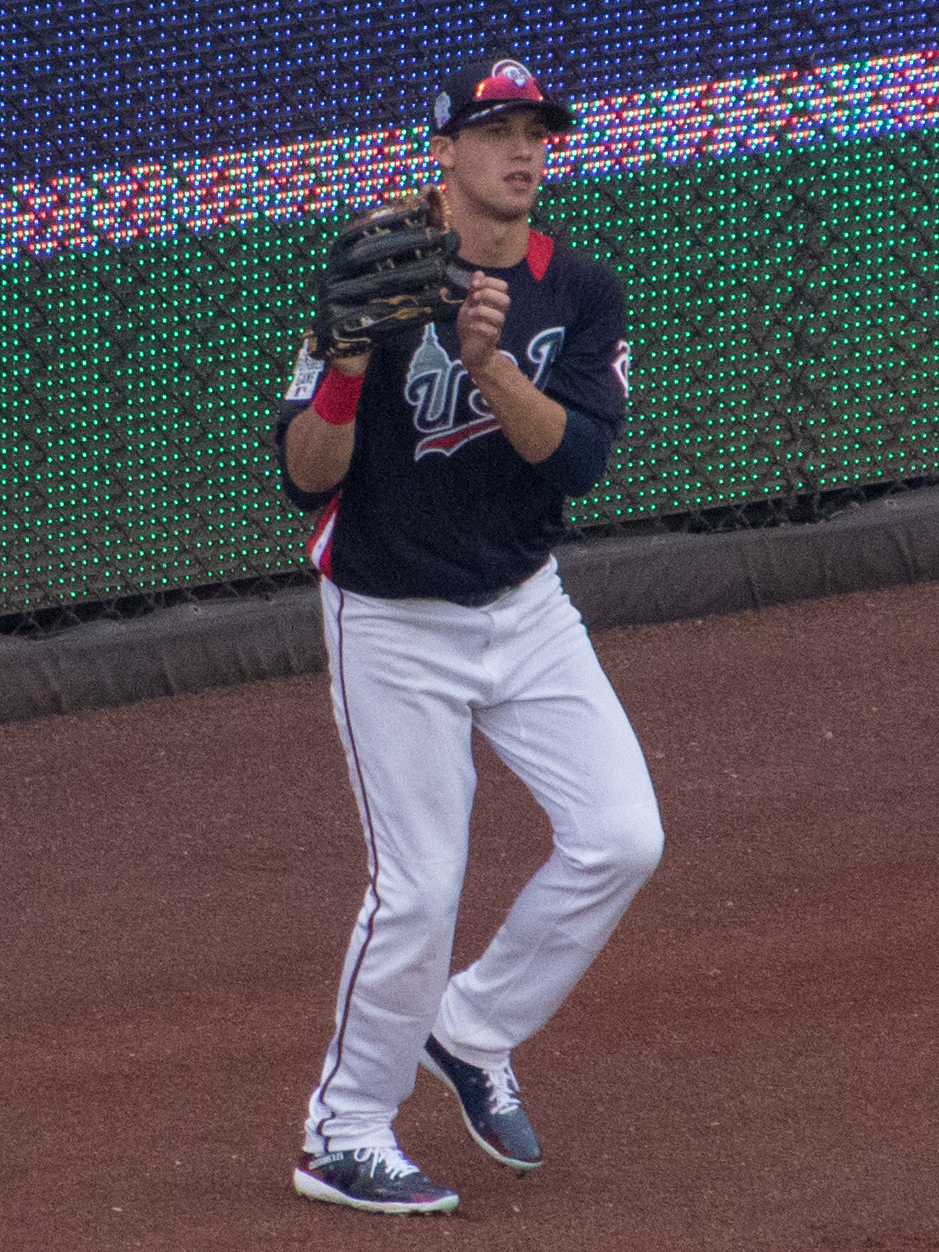
Alex Kirilloff, 2016 Player of the Year Award winner

Eighteen players won Appalachian League awards in recognition for their performance with the Twins. Eleven won Player of the Year Awards, while seven won the Pitcher of the Year Award. Four managers won the Manager of the Year Award, including Fred Waters, who was selected for the honor three times, and Ray Smith, who won the award a league-leading seven times. The team also won four Executive of the Year Awards, the Promotional Award of Excellence (2003 and 2014), and the Community Service Award (2017). Altogether, the Twins have won 37 Appalachian League awards.

Appalachian League Award Winners
Award	Recipient	Season	Ref.
Player of the Year	Dave Vetsch	1984	Ref.
Player of the Year	Mike House	1989	
Player of the Year	Paul Russo	1990	
Player of the Year	Michael Restovich	1998	
Player of the Year	Ruben Salazar	1999	
Player of the Year	Ozzie Lewis	2007	
Player of the Year	Oswaldo Arcia	2010	
Player of the Year	Eddie Rosario	2011	
Player of the Year	Candido Pimentel	2012	
Player of the Year	Max Murphy	2014	
Player of the Year	Alex Kirilloff	2016	
Pitcher of the Year	Ricky Barrett	2002	
Pitcher of the Year	Steven Duguay	2004	
Pitcher of the Year	Dave Bromberg	2007	
Pitcher of the Year	Dan Osterbrock	2008	
Pitcher of the Year	Tim Shibuya	2011	
Pitcher of the Year	Félix Jorge	2014	
Pitcher of the Year	Dereck Rodríguez	2015	
Manager of the Year	Fred Waters	1978	
Manager of the Year	Fred Waters	1981	
Manager of the Year	Fred Waters	1984	
Manager of the Year	Ray Smith	1989	
Manager of the Year	Ray Smith	1990	
Manager of the Year	Ray Smith	1991	
Manager of the Year	Ray Smith	1992	
Manager of the Year	Jeff Carter	2000	
Manager of the Year	Rudy Hernández	2001	
Manager of the Year	Ray Smith	2005	
Manager of the Year	Ray Smith	2006	
Manager of the Year	Ray Smith	2014	
Executive of the Year	Mike Mains	2001	
Executive of the Year	Mike Mains	2005	
Executive of the Year	Mike Mains	2006	
Executive of the Year	Mike Mains	2011	
Promotional Award of Excellence	Elizabethton Twins	2003	
Promotional Award of Excellence	Elizabethton Twins	2014	
Community Service Award	Elizabethton Twins	2017	

=== Hall of Famers ===
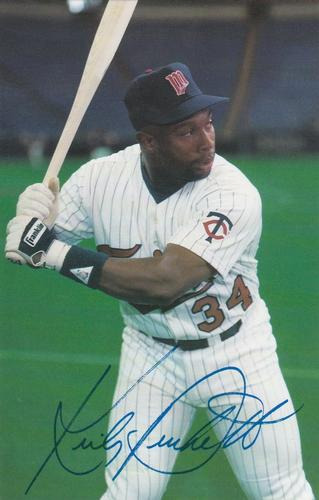
Kirby Puckett was inducted in both the National Baseball Hall of Fame and Appalachian League Hall of Fame.

One former member of the Twins has been elected to the National Baseball Hall of Fame. Outfielder Kirby Puckett, who was inducted in 2001, played 65 games with Elizabethton in 1982, his first professional season. He registered a .382 batting average with 105 hits and 35 RBI in addition to stealing 43 bases.

The Twins have also had five members inducted in the Appalachian League Hall of Fame.

Appalachian League Hall of Famers
Inductee	Year	Position	Ref.
Randy Boyd	2019	Team operator	Ref.
Harold Mains	2020	Team executive	
Mike Mains	2020	General manager	
Kirby Puckett	2019	Outfielder	
Ray Smith	2019	Outfielder	

== Notable players ==
Among the Twins to make significant contributions to Major League Baseball teams after their time in Elizabethton are:

- Jay Bell (1984)
- Byron Buxton (2012)
- Marty Cordova (1989)
- Brian Dozier (2009)
- Jim Eisenreich (1980)
- Gary Gaetti (1979)
- Rich Garcés (1988)
- Matt Garza (2005)
- Eddie Guardado (1991)
- LaTroy Hawkins (1992)
- Denny Hocking (1990)
- Kent Hrbek (1979)
- Max Kepler (2012)
- Corey Koskie (1994)
- Joe Mauer (2001)
- Justin Morneau (2001)
- Denny Neagle (1989)
- Jesse Orosco (1978)
- A. J. Pierzynski (1995)
- Jorge Polanco (2012)
- Kirby Puckett (1982)
- Jeff Reed (1980)
- Todd Ritchie (1990)
- Miguel Sanó (2011)
- Denard Span (2003)
