= Princeton WhistlePigs =

- Logo

Information
- League: Appalachian League
- Location: Princeton, West Virginia
- Ballpark: H. P. Hunnicutt Field
- Founded: 2021
- Folded: 2023
- Colors: Brown, yellow
- President: Dewey Russell
- General manager: Danny Shingleton
- Manager: Patrick Anderson
- Media: WSTG (home games)
- Website: Official website

The Princeton WhistlePigs were a summer collegiate baseball team of the Appalachian League. They were located in Princeton, West Virginia, and played their home games at H. P. Hunnicutt Field. "Whistle pig" is an alternate name for a groundhog.

== History ==
Princeton and H. P. Hunnicutt Field previously served as home to a Minor League Baseball team from 1988 to 2020, last known as the Princeton Rays. In conjunction with a contraction of the minor leagues beginning with the 2021 season, the Appalachian League was reorganized as a collegiate summer baseball league designed for rising college freshmen and sophomores. In the revamped league, the Rays were replaced by the WhistlePigs, who are scheduled to play their first game on June 3, 2021, hosting the Burlington Sock Puppets.

After a 30-22 debut campaign in 2021, the Whistlepigs slumped to sub-.500 records in 2022 and 2023. After a 2023 campaign in which Princeton struggled to a 17-27 mark and finished last in the league in attendance, the franchise announced their departure from the Appalachian League and cessation of operations on October 11.
