= H. P. Hunnicutt Field =

Coordinates: 37°21′30″N 81°6′19″W

H.P. Hunnicutt Field
- Interactive map of H.P. Hunnicutt Field
- Location: 1321 Stafford Drive, Princeton, WV 24740
- Capacity: 1,700
- Surface: Grass
- Field size: Left and right field – 330; Center field – 396

Construction
- Opened: 1988
- Renovated: 1999

Tenants
- Princeton Pirates (1988–89); Princeton Patriots (Co-op) (1990); Princeton Reds (1991–1996); Princeton Rays / Devil Rays (1997–2020); Princeton WhistlePigs (2021-2023)

H.P. Hunnicutt Field is a stadium in Princeton, West Virginia. It is primarily used for baseball, and was the home field of the Princeton WhistlePigs in the summer collegiate Appalachian League until 2023, when the team ceased operations. It is also home to the teams of Princeton Middle School and Princeton High School, located adjacent to the high school football field. Built in 1988, it was developed by the H.P. and Anne S. Hunnicutt Foundation, and it holds 1,700. The stadium was updated in 1999 from wooden bleachers and press boxes to a modernized stadium featuring wrap around bleacher seating down each foul line and box seats behind home plate. Also added were home and visitor locker areas, coach's offices, and training rooms. More recently, a new batting tunnel was constructed near the main gate of the stadium which can accommodate practices in inclement weather.

== Tenants ==
Hunnicutt Field has been home to numerous tenants throughout the years. The first team to play in Princeton was a Pittsburgh Pirates affiliate. They stayed from 1988 to 1989 then quickly left. The Philadelphia Phillies quickly set up a co-op with the Chicago Cubs and Atlanta Braves called the Princeton Patriots. The co-op only lasted through 1990 when the Cincinnati Reds decided to add a team in 1991. The Reds had several successful years but left in 1996. The Tampa Bay Rays' Princeton Rays settled down at Hunnicutt Field in 1997 and remained until after the 2020 season.

== Events ==
Hunnicutt Field hosted portions of the 2006 and 2007 West Virginia Intercollegiate Athletic Conference baseball tournaments.
