= Steve Roadcap =

Steven Craig Roadcap (born September 13, 1960, in Pottsville, Pennsylvania, USA) is the former manager, for two years, of the Reading Phillies, the Double-A affiliate of the Major League Baseball team the Philadelphia Phillies and other minor league teams in the Phillies organization. He managed in the minor leagues in 1988–2010 and played in the minor leagues from 1982 to 1986. He is currently a scout for the Cincinnati Reds.

Roadcap managed in the Chicago Cubs organization from 1988 until 1998. He first managed the Wytheville Cubs, whom he led for two seasons. In 1990, he took over as manager of the Huntington Cubs, whom he led for two seasons as well. He managed the Peoria Chiefs from 1992 to 1994 and then the Rockford Cubbies in 1995 and 1996, leading them to the playoffs both seasons. In 1997 and 1998, he managed the Daytona Cubs.

In 1999, Roadcap began managing the Seattle Mariners organization. He led the Wisconsin Timber Rattlers to the league finals that season, though they lost the series. After three years as the Mariners' minor league catching instructor, he took over as the Inland Empire 66ers manager in 2003 and led them to victory in the California League championship. He managed the Wisconsin Timber Rattlers again in 2004.

He then joined the Philadelphia Phillies organization, managing the Batavia Muckdogs in 2006. In 2007 and 2008, he managed the Lakewood BlueClaws. In 2009 and 2010, he managed the Reading Phillies, leading them to the playoffs in 2009.

As a player, Roadcap hit .199 in 294 games over the course of his five-year minor league career. A catcher, he played in the Cubs farm system.

Preceded by Dave Trembley	Daytona Cubs manager 1997–1998	Succeeded by Nate Oliver
