= Wytheville Cubs =

- 1985–1989; Wytheville, Virginia

Minor league affiliations
- Class: Rookie (1985-1989)
- League: Appalachian League (1985–1989)
- Division: North Division (1985–1989)

Major league affiliations
- Team: Chicago Cubs (1985–1989)

Team data
- Name: Wytheville Cubs (1985–1989)
- Ballpark: Withers Field (1985–1989)

The Wytheville Cubs were a minor league baseball team located in Wytheville, Virginia, between 1948 and 1989 that played under several monikers. An affiliate of the Chicago Cubs from 1985 to 1989, the Wytheville Cubs were members of the Rookie level Appalachian League. Previous Wytheville teams played as members of the Blue Ridge League (1948–1949) and Appalachian League (1953–1955, 1957–1965, 1967, 1969, 1971–1973).

== History ==
The Wytheville Cubs finished with their best record in their first year, when they went 39–31, finishing third in the 1985 Appalachian League.

Previously, Wytheville was home of the Wytheville Braves (1971–1973), Wytheville Senators (1960, 1965, 1969), Wytheville Reds (1967), Wytheville A's (1964), Wytheville Twins (1961–1963), Wytheville Cardinals (1957–1959), Wytheville Statesman (1949, 1953–1955) and Wytheville Pioneers (1948). Wytheville was an affiliate of the Chicago Cubs (1985–1989), Atlanta Braves (1971–1973), Washington Senators II (1965, 1969), Cincinnati Reds (1967), Kansas City A's (1964), Minnesota Twins (1961–1963), Washington Senators I (1960), St. Louis Cardinals (1957–1959), Baltimore Orioles (1954), and St. Louis Browns (1953).

Alumni include Jerome Walton, Tony Oliva, Reggie Smith, Joe Rudi, and Jeff Burroughs.

After the 1989 season, the Wytheville Cubs moved to Huntington, West Virginia to become the Huntington Cubs.

The 1960 Wytheville Senators captured the Appalachian League Championship.

== The ballpark ==
Wytheville teams played at Withers Field. Constructed in 1948, the ballpark hosted all Wytheville minor league teams during its existence. The ballpark was repurposed in 1993 to become a public park, renamed Withers Park. Its grandstand and brick exterior are still in existence today within the park and a plaque recognizes the home plate location. The address is 300 North 4th Street, Wytheville, Virginia, 24382.

== Year-by-year Cubs record ==
Year	Record	Finish	Manager	Playoffs
1985	39-31	3rd	Ramon Conde	None
1986	22-46	7th	Tony Franklin	None
1987	32-38	5th	Brad Mills	None
1988	28-40	9th	Steve Roadcap	None
1989	34-35	4th	Steve Roadcap	None

== Notable franchise alumni ==
- Alex Arias (1987)
- Frank Castillo (1987)
- Matt Franco (1987–1988)
- Derrick May (1986)
- Jerome Walton (1986) 1989 NL Rookie of the Year
