= TVA Credit Union Ballpark =

Stadium in Johnson City, Tennessee

Coordinates: 36°19′7″N 82°20′27″W

- Interactive map of TVA Credit Union Ballpark
- Location: Johnson City, Tennessee
- Owner: City of Johnson City
- Operator: Johnson City Sports Foundation
- Capacity: 3,800
- Surface: Turf
- Field size: Baseball: Left Field: 330 ft (100 m); Center Field: 430 ft (130 m); Right Field: 320 ft (98 m)

Construction
- Groundbreaking: 1950
- Opened: 1950

Tenants
- Johnson City Cardinals (AppL) (1956–2020); East Tennessee State Buccaneers (NCAA DI) (1956–2011); Johnson City Doughboys (AppL) (2021–present); Tri-Cities Otters (USL2) (2021–2022)

TVA Credit Union Ballpark is a stadium in Johnson City, Tennessee. It is primarily used for baseball, and is the home field of Johnson City Doughboys in the summer collegiate Appalachian League. It was previously home to the Johnson City Cardinals Minor League Baseball team of the Appalachian League.

The stadium opened in 1950 as Cardinal Park. It was renamed in 1957 to Phillies Park when the Philadelphia Phillies placed an affiliate team in town. The stadium changed names again when the New York Yankees had its affiliation from 1964-1974 to Yankee Park.

It was renamed Cardinal Field when the St. Louis Cardinals returned as the parent club in 1975, but renamed to Howard Johnson Field in 1977, to honor longtime recreation director who had retired.

The stadium was renamed again to TVA Credit Union Ballpark in 2016. Boyd Sports took over the team and the ballpark in 2016 and made several improvements including a party deck/beer garden known as “The Perch”, new concession items, and a new ticketing system. The stadium holds 3,800 people.
