= Northeast Community Credit Union Ballpark =

Baseball stadium in Elizabethton, Tennessee

- Location within Tennessee
- Former names: Joe O'Brien Field (1981-2017) Riverside Park (1974–1980)
- Address: 208 N Holly Lane; Elizabethton, Tennessee; United States
- Coordinates: 36.354899°N 82.232183°W
- Owner: City of Elizabethton
- Capacity: 2,000
- Field size: Left field: 339 ft (103 m); Center field: 320 ft (98 m); Right field: 320 ft (98 m)

Construction
- Opened: 1974

Tenants
- Elizabethton Twins (APL) 1974–2020; Elizabethton River Riders (APL) from 2021

Northeast Community Credit Union Ballpark is a baseball stadium in Elizabethton, Tennessee.

The venue is owned and subsidized by the City of Elizabethton and the stadium itself is primarily used for Appalachian League summer collegiate baseball as the home field of Elizabethton River Riders that will begin play in 2021. It was previously home to Minor League Baseball as the home field of the Appalachian League's Elizabethton Twins, the rookie affiliate team of the Minnesota Twins from 1974 to 2020. The Elizabethton High School baseball teams also use the Joe O'Brien Field.

Built in 1974, the Joe O'Brien Field ballpark can provide seating for 2,000 people.
