= Bowen Field at Peters Park =

Baseball stadium in Bluefield, Virginia, US

Coordinates: 37°14′58″N 81°14′47″W

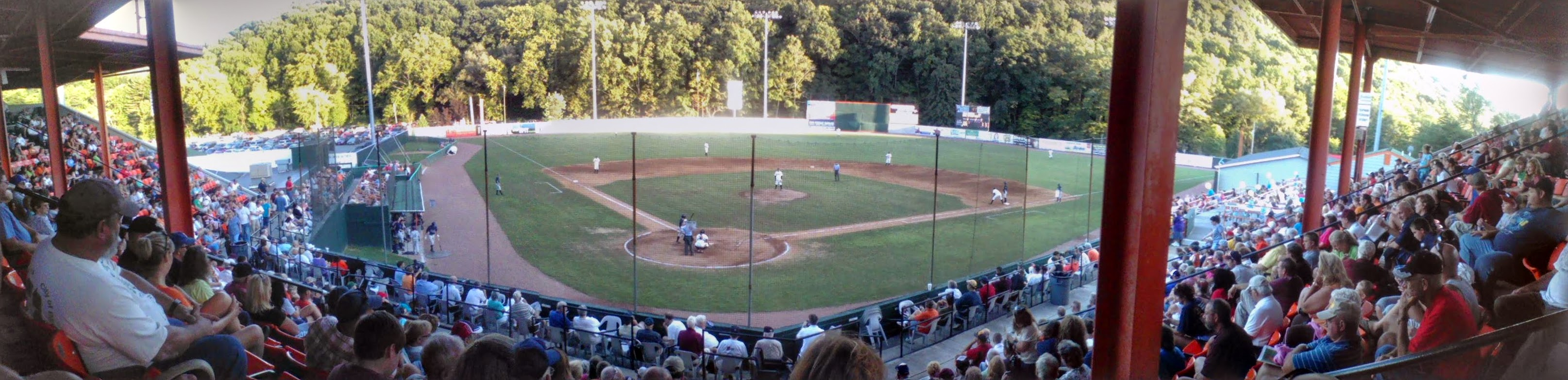
- Interactive map of Bowen Field at Peters Park
- Location: 2003 Stadium Dr., Bluefield, VA 24701-3325
- Operator: City of Bluefield, WV
- Capacity: 2,250
- Surface: Grass
- Field size: Left Field: 335’ Center Field: 399’ Right Field: 335’

Construction
- Opened: 1939
- Renovated: 1973–1975

Tenants
- Bluefield Blue–Grays, Mountain States League (1939–42), Appalachian League (1946–55); Bluefield Dodgers (1957), Bluefield Orioles (1958–2010); Bluefield Blue Jays (2011–2020); Bluefield Ridge Runners (from 2021)

Bowen Field at Peters Park is a stadium in Bluefield, Virginia, United States. Primarily used for baseball, it is the home field for Bluefield Ridge Runners of the summer collegiate Appalachian League and the Bluefield University Rams baseball team. It previously hosted the Bluefield Orioles and the Bluefield Blue Jays of Minor League Baseball from 1939 to 2020.

The stadium was built in 1939 during the Great Depression as a Works Progress Administration project. The original wooden grandstand, bleachers, and press box were destroyed in a fire on the night of May 22–23, 1973, and were reconstructed in part using steel and concrete, reopening in 1974. The current orange chair-back seats at the stadium came from Anaheim Stadium, and were installed at the park in the late 1990s.

The stadium is located in the city park of Bluefield, West Virginia, and is operated the Bluefield Baseball Club. However, the park straddles the Virginia–West Virginia state line, and Bowen Field lies entirely on the Virginia side of the park.

The Blue Jays added "Peters Park" to the ballpark name in May 2017, in honor of a local Bluefield donor, Charles Peters.
