= Johnson City Doughboys =

U.S. baseball team

- Logo

Information
- League: Appalachian League
- Location: Johnson City, Tennessee
- Ballpark: TVA Credit Union Ballpark
- Founded: 2021
- Colors: Black, gold, white
- Ownership: Boyd Sports, LLC
- General manager: Kiva Fuller
- Website: Official website

The Johnson City Doughboys are a summer collegiate baseball team of the Appalachian League. They are located in Johnson City, Tennessee, and play their home games at TVA Credit Union Ballpark.

== History ==
From 1975 to 2020, Johnson City, Tennessee, was home to the Johnson City Cardinals, a Rookie affiliate of the St. Louis Cardinals playing in the Appalachian League. In conjunction with a contraction of Minor League Baseball beginning with the 2021 season, the Appalachian League was reorganized as a collegiate summer baseball league, and the Johnson City Cardinals were replaced by a new franchise in the revamped league designed for rising college freshmen and sophomores.

The new team became known as the Johnson City Doughboys. The nickname is in reference to a statue behind their home stadium, TVA Credit Union Ballpark, named Spirit of the American Doughboy. The statue honors U.S. infantrymen who died during World War I. Doughboys was a nickname for American soldiers during World War I until about the 1940s.
