= Calfee Park =

Baseball stadium in Pulaski, Virginia, U.S.

Coordinates: 37°2′21.5″N 80°46′32″W

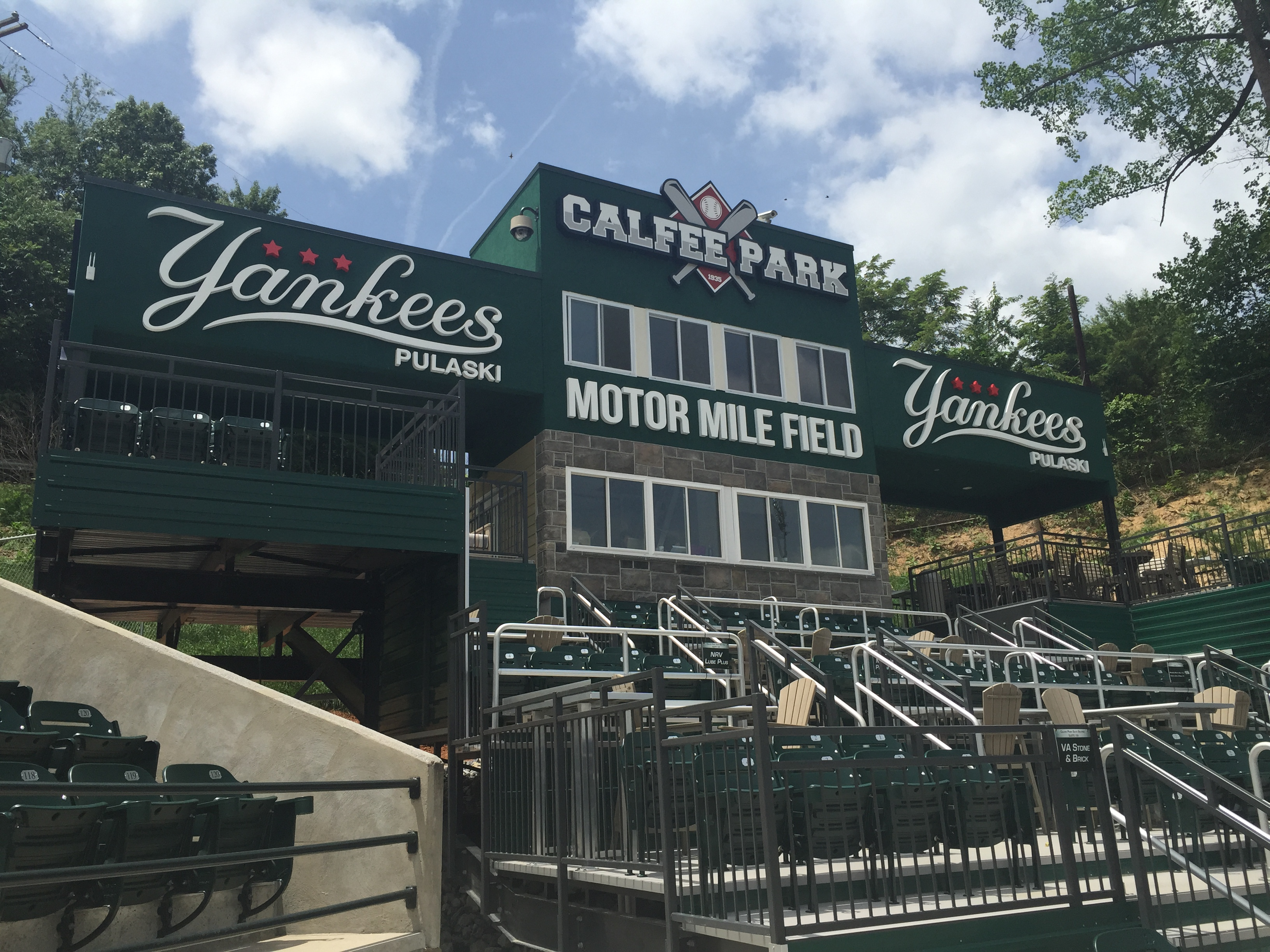
- Press box at Calfee Park, 2015
- Interactive map of Calfee Park
- Location: 700 South Washington Ave, Pulaski, Virginia, 24301
- Owner: Shelor Motor Mile
- Operator: Calfee Park Baseball, Inc.
- Capacity: 3,200
- Surface: Grass
- Field size: Left Field: 338 feet Center Field: 405 feet Right Field: 301 feet with 19 foot wall
- Motor Mile Field
- U.S. National Register of Historic Places
- Virginia Landmarks Register
- Location within Virginia Location within the United States
- Location: Washington and Pierce Aves., SE, Pulaski, Virginia
- Area: 15 acres (6.1 ha)
- Built: 1935
- Architect: Millirons, Edgar Hampton Millirona
- Architectural style: Late 19th And 20th Century Revivals
- NRHP reference No.: 00001432
- VLR No.: 125-0102

Significant dates
- Added to NRHP: November 22, 2000
- Designated VLR: September 13, 2000

Construction
- Opened: 1935
- Renovated: 2015
- Main contractor: Works Progress Administration

Tenants
- Pulaski Counts (1942, 1946–1950); Pulaski Phillies (1952–1955); Pulaski Cubs (1957–1958); Pulaski Phillies (1969–1977); Pulaski Braves (1982–1992); Pulaski Rangers (1997–2002); Pulaski Blue Jays (2003–2006); Pulaski Mariners (2008–2014); Pulaski Yankees (2015–2020); Pulaski River Turtles (from 2021)

Calfee Park is a stadium in Pulaski, Virginia, United States. It is primarily used for baseball, and is the home ballpark of the Pulaski River Turtles in the Appalachian League, a summer collegiate baseball league. It was built in 1935 as a Works Progress Administration project, and is listed on the National Register of Historic Places. Calfee Park was named after the mayor of Pulaski in 1935, Ernest W. Calfee. It holds approximately 3,200 people. Calfee Park is owned and operated by David Hagan and Larry Shelor, owners of Shelor Motor Mile. Calfee Park was voted the best rookie-level ballpark in America in 2019 and 2020 by a fan vote in Ballpark Digest's annual Best of the Ballparks competition.

The park is set off of U.S. Route 11 in a valley within a residential neighborhood. As a result, a number of houses that surround the park have good views of games. The park had major renovations prior to the 1999 season, with a new grandstand behind the plate and along the first-base side as well as “open-air suites” (railed-in areas with picnic tables) farther down on the first-base line. A new scoreboard was also installed.

After the Shelor ownership group purchased Calfee Park from the Town of Pulaski in 2015, over $9 million in renovations were made to the historic park. The park has received a new press box and VIP towers, renovated home clubhouse, new visiting clubhouse, a jumbotron, 18 additional outdoor suites, new concession stand, upgraded souvenirs, additional general admission seating, upgraded padded club seating, renovated ticket offices, and several additional parking lots. Additional renovations since the 2015 season have included a picnic pavilion, three-tiered party deck in left field, and walk-in retail store.

== Renovations ==
- Opened in 1935
- In 1999 the area behind homeplate was renovated, adding individual seats that are sold as reserved seats. There was a fairly large grandstand added to the first base side stretching from homeplate to first base. "open air suites" stretch down the first base line right along the field, past the dugout there is a deck that is sectioned off and used as box seating. There are 13 boxes stretching down the right side of the field. There was a new Concession stand and home clubhouse added in as well.
- In 2009, the town added a 14th box behind homeplate and above the general admission seating. The box looks directly down the first base line. Views of left field are somewhat obstructed when in the "sky box" because of the roof above the old grandstands. Earlier in 2009 there was a new indoor facility constructed on site. It showcases two hitting tunnels that can also be used for pitching work.
- The New York Yankees and the new owners of the Park announced on Sept. 9, 2014 the plan for over $3.5 million of improvements to the park for the 2015 season. The Yankees replaced the Mariners in Pulaski for 2015.
- In July 2018, the Pulaski Yankees announced upcoming renovations to include the addition of approximately 675 seats and a new upper concourse along the third baseline featuring a new concession stand, additional restrooms, and a rooftop "party deck" area. The renovations will bring the main concourse sections to the same level with the new concourse providing access from one end of the park to the other.
- Prior to the 2019 season, the Pulaski Yankees added a new concourse along the third-base line, a three-tiered party deck in left field, and a walk-in retail store. The party deck was named the Best Ballpark Improvement (under $1 million) by Ballpark Digest.
