= Johnny Grodzicki =

American baseball player (1917–1998)

- Pitcher
- Born: February 26, 1917; Nanticoke, Pennsylvania, U.S.
- Died: May 2, 1998 (aged 81); Daytona Beach, Florida, U.S.
- Batted: Right Threw: Right

MLB debut
- April 18, 1941, for the St. Louis Cardinals

Last MLB appearance
- September 17, 1947, for the St. Louis Cardinals

MLB statistics
- Win–loss record: 2–2
- Earned run average: 4.43
- Strikeouts: 20
- Stats at Baseball Reference

Teams
- St. Louis Cardinals (1941, 1946–1947)

John Grodzicki (February 26, 1917 – May 2, 1998) was an American Major League Baseball pitcher. A native of Nanticoke, Pennsylvania, he pitched for the St. Louis Cardinals in 1941, 1946 and 1947. The right-hander stood 6 feet 1 inch (1.85 m) and weighed 200 pounds (91 kg).

A top pitching prospect before the outbreak of World War II, Grodzicki would pitch in 24 games (23 in a relief role) for the Cardinals, winning 2 and losing 2, with an earned run average of 4.43. He allowed 31 hits and 34 bases on balls in 402/3 MLB innings pitched, with 20 strikeouts.

Grodzicki's baseball career was interrupted by four years of military service. He served in the United States Army's 17th Airborne Division and became a paratrooper. In combat in Germany on March 29, 1945, Grodzicki sustained shrapnel wounds to both legs. He was awarded a Purple Heart, and required surgery and extensive rehabilitation to resume his baseball career after the war's end.

Grodzicki's professional playing career — spent entirely in the Cardinal organization — stretched from 1936 through 1952, including 11 years in minor league baseball. He later managed in the Redbird farm system, scouted for the Cardinals, then became a minor league instructor for the Detroit Tigers for over a dozen years. He then spent a season (1979) as the Tigers' MLB pitching coach. He died at age 81 in Daytona Beach, Florida.

Preceded by Fred Gladding	Detroit Tigers pitching coach 1979	Succeeded by Roger Craig
