= Pulaski River Turtles =

- Logo

Information
- League: Appalachian League
- Location: Pulaski, Virginia
- Ballpark: Calfee Park
- Founded: 2021
- Division championships: 2 (2021, 2026)
- Former name: Pulaski Yankees
- Colors: Green, black, white, yellow, gray
- Ownership: Calfee Park Inc.
- General manager: JW Martin
- Website: Official website

The Pulaski River Turtles are a summer collegiate baseball team of the Appalachian League. They are located in Pulaski, Virginia, and play their home games at Calfee Park.

== History ==
=== Previous Pulaski teams ===
Professional baseball was first played in Pulaski, Virginia, in 1942 as the Pulaski Counts. They were affiliated with eight different Major League Baseball teams and also played as an independent club for a few seasons. Their final affiliation as a rookie league professional club was with the New York Yankees. The team played its home games at Calfee Park.

The Pulaski Yankees were awarded Minor League Baseball's top honor, the John H. Johnson President's Award, in 2019. The award recognizes the "complete baseball franchise—based on franchise stability, contributions to league stability, contributions to baseball in the community, and promotion of the baseball industry."

=== Collegiate summer team ===
In conjunction with a contraction of Minor League Baseball beginning with the 2021 season, the Appalachian League was reorganized as a collegiate summer baseball league, and the Pulaski Yankees continued under a new name, the Pulaski River Turtles, in the revamped league designed for rising college freshmen and sophomores. The nickname refers to the team's location in the New River Valley. The 2021 season will mark Pulaski's 55th season fielding teams in the Appalachian League.
