= Princeton Rays =

- 1988–2020; Princeton, West Virginia

Team logo	Cap insignia

Minor league affiliations
- Class: Rookie Advanced (1988–2020)
- League: Appalachian League (1988–2020)

Major league affiliations
- Team: Tampa Bay Rays (1997–2020); Cincinnati Reds (1991–1996); Co-op (1990); Pittsburgh Pirates (1988–1989)

Minor league titles
- League titles (1): 1994
- Division titles (3): 1994; 1998; 2018

Team data
- Name: Princeton Rays (2009–2020); Princeton Devil Rays (1997–2008); Princeton Reds (1991–1996); Princeton Patriots (1990); Princeton Pirates (1988–1989)
- Ballpark: H. P. Hunnicutt Field (1988–2020)

The Princeton Rays were a Minor League Baseball team in Princeton, West Virginia, operating as an Advanced Rookie-level team in the Appalachian League. The team was affiliated with several Major League Baseball (MLB) franchises, primarily the Tampa Bay Rays.

== History ==
The Princeton franchise began play in the Appalachian League in 1988 and was first affiliated with the Pittsburgh Pirates for two seasons. The team was next a cooperative for the 1990 season, known as the Princeton Patriots, and was then affiliated with the Cincinnati Reds from 1991 to 1996. The team's final affiliation was with the Tampa Bay Devil Rays/Rays from 1997 to 2020. After being known as the Princeton Devil Rays during the 1997–2008 seasons, the team announced on December 2, 2008, that they would update their name, logo, colors, and uniforms as their parent club had done the previous year.

Through completion of the 2012 season, the franchise had seen 57 former players move on to play in Major League Baseball, including: Brandon Backe, Rocco Baldelli, Carl Crawford, Jonny Gomes, Josh Hamilton, Seth McClung, Pokey Reese, Matt Moore, Wade Davis, Desmond Jennings, Jeremy Hellickson, Jason Hammel, and Jared Sandberg. NFL quarterback Doug Johnson and NBA referee David Guthrie also played professional baseball for Princeton teams, in 1997 and 1995, respectively. The team was operated on a not-for-profit basis.

The Princeton Rays played their home games at H. P. Hunnicutt Field, which originally opened in 1988 (and was completely rebuilt in 2000 on the same site) and held 1,950 fans. The team played an annual 68-game schedule that traditionally extended from mid-June through the end of August.

The start of the 2020 season was postponed due to the COVID-19 pandemic before ultimately being cancelled on June 30. In conjunction with a reorganization of Minor League Baseball beginning with the 2021 season, the Appalachian League was converted to a collegiate summer baseball league intended for rising college freshmen and sophomores. In the revamped league, the Rays continued as the Princeton WhistlePigs.

== Playoffs ==
- 1994: Defeated Johnson City 2–1 to win championship.
- 1998: Lost to Bristol 2–0 in finals.
- 2014: Lost to Danville 2–0 in semifinals.
- 2015: Defeated Pulaski 2–1 in semifinals; lost to Greeneville 2–1 in finals.
- 2016: Lost to Burlington 2–1 in semifinals.
- 2018: Defeated Bluefield 2–1 in semifinals; lost to Elizabethton 2–0 in finals.

== Notable alumni ==
- Alex Cobb (2006)
- Carl Crawford (1999) 4 x MLB All-Star
- Wade Davis (2004) 3 x MLB All-Star
- Chad Fox (1992)
- Jonny Gomes (2001)
- Josh Hamilton (1999) 5 x MLB All-Star; 2010 AL Batting Title; 2010 AL Most Valuable Player
- Jason Hammel (1992)
- Jeremy Hellickson (2005)
- Kevin Kiermaier (2010)
- Matt Moore (2007–2008) MLB All-Star
- Pokey Reese (1991) 2 x Gold Glove
- John Stearns (1994, MGR) 4 x MLB All-Star
