= Rudy Hernández (baseball, born 1968) =

Venezuelan baseball player, coach and manager

- Hitting coach
- Born: April 9, 1968 (age 57); Turmero, Venezuela
- Bats: Right Throws: Right
- Stats at Baseball Reference

Teams
- As coach: Minnesota Twins (2015–2024)

Rodolfo Jesús Hernández (born April 9, 1968) is a Venezuelan professional baseball coach and a former minor league infielder, coach and manager. He has previously served as the assistant hitting coach for the Minnesota Twins of Major League Baseball (MLB). He was born in Maracay, Aragua, Venezuela.

== Career ==
A former second baseman and third baseman, Hernández played for five seasons (1987–91) in the New York Mets' farm system, peaking at the Double-A level. He batted .250 in 493 games played. He threw and batted right-handed and was listed at 5 feet 10 inches (1.78 m) tall and 160 pounds (73 kg)

Hernández was named to manager Paul Molitor's 2015 coaching staff after serving for 14 seasons as a coach and instructor in the Twins' minor-league system, including managerial assignments with the Rookie-level Elizabethton Twins (2001) and Gulf Coast League Twins (2002–03). He previously worked as a Venezuela-based scout for the Twins. At the time of his appointment, Hernández was also serving as bench coach with the Aragua Tigers of the Venezuelan Winter League. On October 2, 2024, Hernández and the Twins organization parted ways.
