= Elizabethton River Riders =

Collegiate baseball team in Elizabethton, Tennessee

- Logo

Information
- League: Appalachian League
- Location: Elizabethton, Tennessee
- Ballpark: Northeast Community Credit Union Ballpark
- Founded: 2021
- Colors: Navy, light blue, gold, green, white
- Ownership: Boyd Sports, LLC
- General manager: Kiva Fuller
- Website: Official website

The Elizabethton River Riders are a summer collegiate baseball team of the Appalachian League. They are located in Elizabethton, Tennessee, and play their home games at Northeast Community Credit Union Ballpark.

== History ==
=== Previous Elizabethton teams ===
Professional baseball was first played in Elizabethton, Tennessee, by the Elizabethton Betsy Red Sox in the Appalachian League in 1937. They remained in the league through 1942. The city's Appalachian League entry from 1945 to 1948 was called the Elizabethton Betsy Cubs. They were followed by the Elizabethton Betsy Local from 1949 to 1950 and the Elizabethton Phils in 1951. Thirty-six years later, the Minnesota Twins placed the Elizabethton Twins in the Appalachian League as a Rookie-level affiliate in 1974.

=== Collegiate summer team ===
In conjunction with a contraction of Minor League Baseball beginning with the 2021 season, the Appalachian League was reorganized as a collegiate summer baseball league, and the Elizabethton Twins were replaced by a new franchise in the revamped league designed for rising college freshmen and sophomores. The new team became known as the Elizabethton River Riders. The nickname is in reference to the Watauga River, which runs just behind their stadium, Northeast Community Credit Union Ballpark.
