= Scott Breeden =

American pitcher and pitching coach in professional baseball

Breeden

Harold Scott Breeden (September 17, 1937 – February 21, 2006) was an American pitcher and pitching coach in professional baseball. A native of Charlottesville, Virginia, he threw and batted right-handed, stood 6 feet 2 inches (1.88 m) tall and weighed 190 pounds (86 kg).

Breeden graduated from Reily High School of Hamilton, Ohio, in 1956 and attended Miami University. He signed with the Brooklyn Dodgers in 1956 and enjoyed his best minor league season in 1958 for the Kokomo Dodgers, winning 17 of 22 decisions (.773) with an earned run average of 2.09. He also pitched a no-hit game that season against the Keokuk Cardinals on May 19. After 2½ seasons at the Triple-A level in the Dodger system, he was traded to the Cincinnati Reds before the 1963 season for infielder Don Zimmer. In 12 minor league seasons (1956–67), Breeden won 102 games and lost 90, with an ERA of 4.02 in 422 career appearances.

Although he never reached Major League Baseball as a player, Breeden spent 14 seasons (1968–81) as the roving minor league pitching instructor for the Cincinnati organization and was the Reds' MLB pitching coach from 1986 to 1989, serving under Pete Rose and Tommy Helms. He also scouted for the Reds and served as a minor league pitching coach for the Chicago Cubs and Toronto Blue Jays.

Scott Breeden died at age 68 in Temple Terrace, Florida.

Preceded by Jim Kaat	Cincinnati Reds Pitching Coach; 1986–1989	Succeeded by Stan Williams
