= Bluefield Ridge Runners =

Collegiate summer baseball team based in Bluefield, West Virginia

- Logo

Information
- League: Appalachian League
- Location: Bluefield, West Virginia
- Ballpark: Bowen Field at Peters Park (2,250)
- Founded: 2021
- League championships: 2025
- Colors: Black, blue, light blue, white
- Ownership: Bluefield Baseball Club
- General manager: Rocky Malamisura
- Manager: Drew Dosch
- Website: www.milb.com/bluefield

The Bluefield Ridge Runners are a summer collegiate baseball team of the Appalachian League. They are located in Bluefield, West Virginia, and play their home games at Bowen Field at Peters Park.

== History ==
=== Previous Bluefield teams ===
Professional baseball was first played in Bluefield, West Virginia, in 1937 by the Bluefield Grays. They were affiliated with six different Major League Baseball teams and also played as an independent club for a few seasons. As the Bluefield Orioles, they were affiliated with the Baltimore Orioles, but the team ended their affiliation with Bluefield and the Appalachian League at the end of the 2010 season. Bluefield's 53-season affiliation with the Orioles, which lasted from 1958 to 2010, had been the oldest continuous affiliation with the same major league franchise in Minor League Baseball. The Bluefield Blue Jays became an affiliate organization with the Toronto Blue Jays in 2011.

=== Collegiate summer team ===
In conjunction with a contraction and reorganization of Minor League Baseball beginning with the 2021 season, the Appalachian League was reorganized as a collegiate summer baseball league designed for rising college freshmen and sophomores; the Bluefield Blue Jays lost their affiliation with Toronto, but the franchise continued on in the revamped league and rebranded as the Bluefield Ridge Runners. The moniker is in reference to the city's railroading heritage. Their namesake, the Ridge Runner narrow-gauge passenger train, has been a local tourist attraction since 1964. It traverses a loop throughout Lottio Park beyond the right field wall at Bowen Field, the team's home ballpark. The Ridge Runners won their first Appalachian League title in 2025.
