= Fred Waters =

American baseball player (1927–1989)

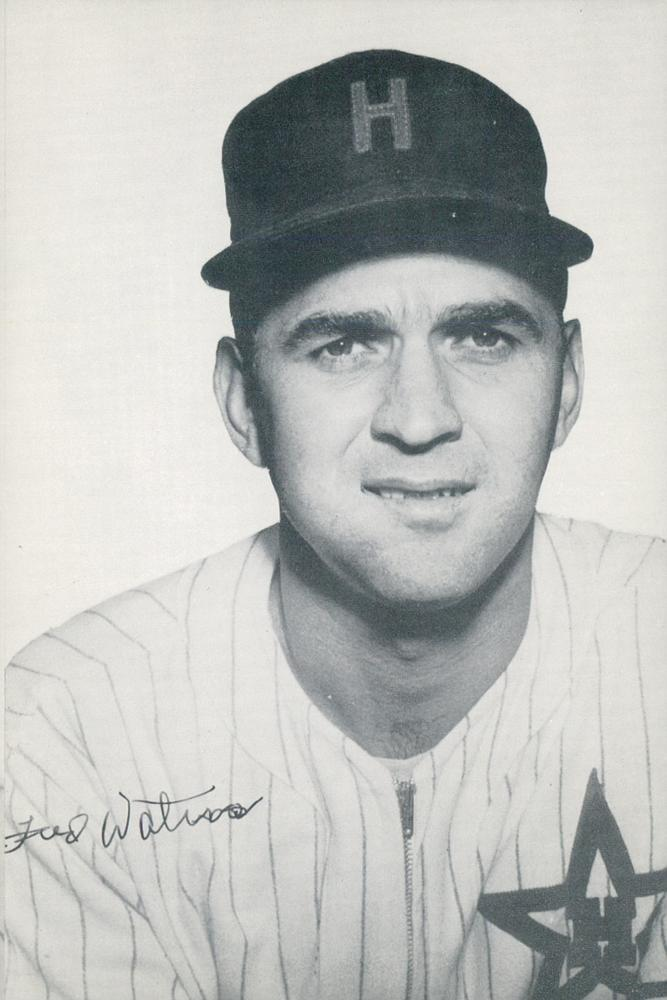
- Waters with the Hollywood Stars c. 1957
- Pitcher
- Born: February 2, 1927; Benton, Mississippi, U.S.
- Died: August 28, 1989 (aged 62); Pensacola, Florida, U.S.
- Batted: Left Threw: Left

MLB debut
- September 20, 1955, for the Pittsburgh Pirates

Last MLB appearance
- September 23, 1956, for the Pittsburgh Pirates

MLB statistics
- Win–loss record: 2–2
- Earned run average: 2.89
- Strikeouts: 14
- Innings pitched: 56
- Stats at Baseball Reference

Teams
- Pittsburgh Pirates (1955–1956)

Fred Warren Waters (February 2, 1927 – August 28, 1989) was an American professional baseball player, manager, scout and coach. The left-handed pitcher appeared in 25 Major League games for the 1955–56 Pittsburgh Pirates. Born in Benton, Mississippi, Waters attended the University of Southern Mississippi. He stood 5 feet 11 inches (1.80 m) tall and weighed 185 pounds (84 kg).

== Career ==
Apart from his trials with the Pirates, Waters had a 13-season (1949–58; 1960–62) pitching career in minor league baseball. He was first signed by the Brooklyn Dodgers, then acquired by the Milwaukee Braves in April 1953, spending most of that season with the Lincoln Chiefs of the Class A Western League. Then, on December 26, 1953, he was traded to Pittsburgh along with third baseman Sid Gordon, outfielder Sam Jethroe, pitcher Max Surkont, fellow minor leaguers Curt Raydon and Larry Lasalle, and $100,000 for third baseman Danny O'Connell. This is the only six-for-one trade in Major League history and was surpassed only by the seven-for-one deal that sent Vida Blue from the Oakland Athletics to the San Francisco Giants in 1978.

Waters appeared in two games in relief for the Pirates at the end of the 1955 season, then worked in 23 games for them over the last three months of 1956 after his recall from the Open-Classification Hollywood Stars of the Pacific Coast League. Both of his MLB victories came in starting roles. His first big-league triumph came on July 26, when he went seven shutout innings against the Chicago Cubs, allowing only four singles and three bases on balls. Howie Pollet relieved Waters in the eighth inning with two runners on base, and preserved the 4–0 shutout win.

Over his 25 Major League games and 56 innings pitched, Waters allowed 55 hits and compiled a strong 2.89 career earned run average. However, he issued 32 bases on balls, with only 14 strikeouts.

Waters appeared in only seven minor league games in 1958 and sat out the 1959 season completely. He became a high school baseball coach in Pensacola, Florida. But in 1960, at age 33, he returned to baseball as a pitcher-coach for the Class D Pensacola Angels of the Alabama–Florida League. In three seasons with Pensacola's professional franchise, he appeared in 73 games, largely as a starting pitcher, and compiled a 41–13 record and a sparkling 2.04 earned run average.

In 1964, Waters became a manager and coach in the farm system of the Minnesota Twins, while continuing his high school coaching duties in Pensacola. During Waters' 22 seasons as a manager, all of them in short-season leagues (Rookie and Short Season-A levels), his teams went 681–664 (.505).

Waters retired from managing after the 1986 season, and died in Pensacola three years later at the age of 62.
