= Paul Snyder (baseball) =

American baseball executive (1935–2023)

- Born: June 11, 1935; Dallastown, Pennsylvania, U.S.
- Died: November 30, 2023 (aged 88); Hayesville, North Carolina, U.S.
- Occupations: Baseball player, scout and executive
- Years active: 1958–2007

Paul Luther Snyder (June 11, 1935 – November 30, 2023) was an American front-office executive in Major League Baseball. He played an integral role in the rise and sustained dominance of the Atlanta Braves that began in 1991 and continued into the first decade of the 21st century, as the team's longtime amateur scouting director (1981–90; 1999–2000), assistant to the general manager (1991–95; 2001–06), and director of player development (1977–80; 1996–98).

In recognition of Snyder's career accomplishments, Baseball America named him one of the top 25 people in the game on the publication's 25th anniversary in 2006.

== Life and career ==
Paul Luther Snyder was born in Dallastown, Pennsylvania on June 11, 1935. He spent his entire 50-year professional baseball career in the Braves' organization, signing with them as an outfielder and first baseman in 1958 when the team was still based in Milwaukee. As a player, Snyder never reached the Major Leagues, peaking at the Triple-A level in 1963 with the Denver Bears of the Pacific Coast League — a season which also saw his debut as a minor league manager in the Braves' farm system. Snyder, however, was a strong hitter in his playing days, compiling a lifetime batting average of .318 during his seven-year active career. In his finest over-all campaign, 1962 with the Austin Senators of the Double-A Texas League, Snyder hit .312 with 19 home runs and 113 RBI in 132 games played. He batted left-handed and threw right-handed, stood 6 ft 2 in (1.88 m) tall and weighed 200 pounds (91 kg).

Snyder managed Braves' farm clubs and scouted for them between 1963 and 1972. In 1973, he joined the team's front office as assistant minor league administrator before taking the reins of the Braves' farm department in 1977. Working with then-general managers Bill Lucas and John Mullen, Snyder was a major architect of the Braves' strong early 1980s teams under manager Joe Torre—despite having suffered a stroke at age 40 that required brain surgery and an extensive period of rehabilitation.

When the MLB Braves went through a prolonged rebuilding process after winning the 1982 National League West Division championship, Snyder, by now scouting director, assisted general manager Bobby Cox in drafting and developing the talent base—players such as Tom Glavine, Steve Avery, David Justice, Jeff Blauser and Chipper Jones—that served as the foundation for the Braves' string of first-place teams of the 1990s through 2005, including the 1995 world champions. He also served as a top assistant to John Schuerholz when he took over the Atlanta front office after the 1990 season and performed several key functions in the Braves' baseball operations department in addition to working as scouting or player development director.

Snyder retired from the Braves after the 2007 season, which saw Schuerholz move upstairs to the team presidency and a new general manager, Frank Wren, assume control of baseball operations. In 2005, he was inducted into the Braves Museum and Hall of Fame. In 2006, he was presented with the King of Baseball award given by Minor League Baseball. In 2013, he was selected for the Professional Baseball Scouts Hall of Fame.

Snyder died on November 30, 2023, at the age of 88.
