= Johnson City Cardinals =

- (1957–1961, 1964–2020); Johnson City, Tennessee
Team logo
Cap insignia

Minor league affiliations
- Class: Rookie (1964–2020); Class D (1957–1961)
- League: Appalachian League (1957–1961; 1964–2020)

Major league affiliations
- Team: St. Louis Cardinals (1975–2020); New York Yankees (1964–1974); St. Louis Cardinals (1961); Philadelphia Phillies (1957–1960)

Minor league titles
- League titles (9): 1958; 1964; 1975; 1976; 2010; 2011; 2014; 2016; 2019
- Division titles (8): 1986; 1987; 1994; 2010; 2011; 2014; 2016; 2019

Team data
- Name: Johnson City Cardinals (1975–2020); Johnson City Yankees (1964–1974); Johnson City Cardinals (1961); Johnson City Phillies (1957–1960)
- Ballpark: TVA Credit Union Ballpark (1957–1961, 1964–2020)

The Johnson City Cardinals were a Minor League Baseball team based in Johnson City, Tennessee. The team was affiliated with the St. Louis Cardinals organization from 1975 through 2020 and played in the Rookie-level Appalachian League. The team won 10 league championships, most recently in 2019. They played their home games at TVA Credit Union Ballpark.

The start of the 2020 season was postponed due to the COVID-19 pandemic before ultimately being cancelled on June 30. In conjunction with a contraction of Minor League Baseball beginning with the 2021 season, the Appalachian League was reorganized as a collegiate summer baseball league, and the Cardinals were replaced by the Johnson City Doughboys, a new franchise in the revamped league designed for rising college freshmen and sophomores.

== Playoffs ==
From 1986 to 2019, Johnson City reached the playoffs by virtue of winning their division or clinching a playoff spot eight times. The results of their postseason play during this time was as follows.

- 1986: Lost to Pulaski 2–1 in finals.
- 1987: Lost to Burlington 2–0 in finals.
- 1994: Lost to Princeton 2–1 in finals.
- 2010: Defeated Burlington 2–0 in semifinals; defeated Elizabethton 2–0 to win championship.
- 2011: Defeated Danville 2–1 in semifinals; defeated Bluefield 2–1 to win championship.
- 2012: Lost to Burlington 2–1 in semifinals.
- 2014: Defeated Elizabethton 2–1 in semifinals; defeated Danville 2–1 to win championship.
- 2016: Defeated Elizabethton 2–1 in semifinals; defeated Burlington 2–0 to win championship.
- 2019: Defeated Bristol 2–1 in semifinals; defeated Burlington 2–1 to win championship.

== Notable alumni ==
Many of the players fielded by Johnson City have gone on to distinguish themselves in Major League Baseball.

- Matt Adams (2009)
- Rick Ankiel (2001)
- Ron Blomberg (1967)
- Glenn Brummer (1975)
- Danny Cater (1958)
- Vince Coleman (1982) 2 x MLB All-Star; 1985 NL Rookie of the Year
- Pat Corrales (1959)
- Danny Cox (1981)
- Coco Crisp (1999)
- Tony Cruz (2007)
- Ray Culp (1959) 2 x MLB All-Star
- Joe Cunningham (1949) 2 x MLB All-Star
- Jeff Fassero (1984)
- Curt Ford (1981)
- Ron Guidry (1971) 4 x MLB All-Star; 2 x AL ERA Leader (1978-1979); 1978 AL CY Young Award
- Cesar Geronimo (1967)
- Mike Heath (1974)
- Tom Herr (1975) MLB All-Star
- LaMarr Hoyt (1973) MLB All-Star; 1983 AL Cy Young Award
- Stan Javier (1981–82)
- Terry Kennedy (1977) 4 x MLB All-Star
- Ray Lankford (1987) MLB All-Star
- Joe Magrane (1985) 1988 NL ERA Leader
- Yadier Molina (2001) 8 x Gold Glove; 9 x MLB All-Star
- Bill Monbouquette (1969, MGR) 4 x MLB All-Star
- Jason Motte (2003) 2012 NL Saves Leader
- Bobby Murcer (1964) 5 x MLB All-Star
- Jerry Narron, MLB player, coach, and manager
- Ken Oberkfell (1975)
- Terry Pendleton (1982) MLB All-Star; 1991 NL Most Valuable Player
- David Peralta (2006–07) Gold Glove, Silver Slugger
- Tommy Pham (2006)
- Ryan Sherriff (2011)
- Chris Short (1957) 2 x MLB All-Star
- Oscar Taveras (2010) Died, age 22
- Otto Velez (1970)
- Jack Wilson (1998) 2004 MLB All-Star
- Bobby Wine (1957) Gold Glove
- Dmitri Young (1991) 2 x MLB All-Star
