= Bluefield Blue Jays =

- 1937–2020; Bluefield, Virginia
Team logo
Cap insignia

Minor league affiliations
- Class: Advanced Rookie (1963–2020); Class D− (1957–1962); Class D (1946–1955); Class C (1942); Class D (1937–1940)
- League: Appalachian League (1946–1955, 1957–2020); Mountain State League (1937–1942)

Major league affiliations
- Team: Toronto Blue Jays (2011–2020); Baltimore Orioles (1958–2010); Brooklyn Dodgers (1957); Boston Red Sox (1954–1955); Washington Senators (1953); Boston Braves (1946–1951)

Minor league titles
- League titles (14): 1949; 1950; 1954; 1957; 1962; 1963; 1967; 1970; 1971; 1982; 1992; 1996; 1997; 2001
- Division titles (12): 1971; 1974; 1976; 1982; 1992; 1995; 1996; 1997; 2001; 2002; 2011; 2017

Team data
- Name: Bluefield Blue Jays (2011–2020); Bluefield Orioles (1958–2010); Bluefield Dodgers (1957); Bluefield Blue–Grays (1937–1942, 1946–1955)
- Colors: Blue, white, navy, red
- Ballpark: Bowen Field at Peters Park (1946–1955, 1957–2020)

The Bluefield Blue Jays were a minor league baseball team of the Rookie Appalachian League representing the twin cities of Bluefield, West Virginia, and Bluefield, Virginia. The team played their home games at Bowen Field at Peters Park, a historic stadium (opened in 1939) in Bluefield's city park. The park, which straddles the West Virginia–Virginia state line, was operated by the West Virginia city; however, Bowen Field lies entirely within Virginia.

Upon the minor league reorganization in 2020, the team's partnership with the Toronto Blue Jays ended and they rebranded as the Bluefield Ridge Runners.

== History ==
On August 28, 2010, Andy MacPhail, then-president of baseball operations for the Baltimore Orioles announced that Baltimore was ending their affiliation with Bluefield and the Appalachian League, effective at the end of that season. Bluefield's 53-season affiliation with the Orioles, which lasted from 1958 to 2010, had been the oldest continuous affiliation with the same major league franchise in Minor League Baseball.

The Orioles were sometimes known as the "Baby Birds" or the "Baby O's", a reference to their major league parent club. One of the best known players to have played in Bluefield is Cal Ripken Jr., who played with Bluefield in 1978 when he was 17 years old. Another famous former Baby Bird is Boog Powell, who played there in 1959, also as a 17 year old.

Bluefield became an affiliate organization with the Toronto Blue Jays for the 2011 season. Outfielder Kevin Pillar played for Bluefield that season, batted .347, won the Appalachian League batting title, and led the Blue Jays minor leaguers in batting average. In August 2013, Pillar became the first Bluefield Blue Jays alumnus to play for Toronto.

The start of the 2020 season was postponed due to the COVID-19 pandemic before ultimately being cancelled on June 30. In conjunction with a contraction of Minor League Baseball beginning with the 2021 season, the Appalachian League was reorganized as a collegiate summer baseball league, and the Blue Jays rebranded as the Ridge Runners in the revamped league designed for rising college freshmen and sophomores.

== Playoffs ==
- 1992: Defeated Elizabethton 2–1 to win championship.
- 1995: Lost to Kingsport 2–1 in finals.
- 1996: Defeated Kingsport 2–1 to win championship.
- 1997: Defeated Pulaski 2–0 to win championship.
- 2001: Defeated Elizabethton 2–1 to win championship.
- 2002: Lost to Bristol 2–1 in finals.
- 2011: Defeated Elizabethton 2–1 in semifinals, lost to Johnson City 2–0 in finals.
- 2013: Lost to Pulaski 2–0 in semifinals.
- 2017: Lost to Pulaski 2–1 in semifinals.
- 2018: Lost to Princeton 2–1 in semifinals.

== Notable alumni ==
Hall of Fame alumni

- Eddie Murray (1973) Inducted, 2003
- Cal Ripken Jr. (1978) Inducted, 2007

Notable alumni

- Joe Altobelli (1966–1967, MGR) Manager: 1983 World Series Champion Baltimore Orioles
- Don Baylor (1967) MLB All-Star, 1979 AL Most Valuable Player
- Mark Belanger (1962) MLB All-Star, 8x Gold Glove
- Armando Benitez (1992) 2x MLB All-Star
- Mike Boddicker (1978) 2x MLB All-Star, 1984 AL ERA Leader
- Zach Britton (2006) 2x MLB All-Star, 2016 AL Saves Leader
- Don Buford (2003, MGR) MLB All-Star
- Dean Chance (1959) 2x MLB All-Star, 1964 AL Cy Young Award
- Storm Davis (1979) MLB All-Star
- Doug DeCinces (1970) MLB All-Star
- Andy Etchebarren (1993–1994, 1998, MGR) 2x MLB All-Star
- Jim Frey (1964–1965, MGR) 1984 NL Manager of the Year
- Bobby Grich (1967) 6x MLB All-Star
- Vladimir Guerrero Jr. (2016, 2018) 4x MLB All-Star, 2021 MLB home run leader
- Pete Harnisch (1987) MLB All-Star
- Billy Hunter (1962–1963, MGR) MLB All-Star
- Jim Johnson (2002–2003) MLB All-Star; 2012, 2013 MLB saves leader
- Sparky Lyle (1964) 3x MLB All-Star, 1977 AL Cy Young Award
  - Johnny Oates (1967) 1996 AL Manager of the Year
- Roberto Osuna (2012) MLB All-Star
- Boog Powell (1959) 4x MLB All-Star, 1970 AL Most Valuable Player
- Arthur Rhodes (1988) MLB All-Star
- Aaron Sanchez (2011) MLB All-Star, 2016 AL ERA Leader
- Jonathan Schoop (2010) MLB All-Star
- Ron Shelton (1967) Director and screenwriter of Bull Durham
- Noah Syndergaard (2011) MLB All-Star

== See also ==
- Bluefield Blue Jays players
- Bluefield Orioles players
- Bluefield Dodgers players
- Bluefield Blue-Grays players
