= Pulaski Yankees =

- 1942–2020; Pulaski, Virginia
Team logo
Cap insignia

Minor league affiliations
- Class: Advanced Rookie League (1969–1977, 1982–1992, 1997–2006, 2008–2020); Class D (1946–1958); Class C (1942)
- League: Appalachian League (1946–1950, 1952–1955, 1957–1958, 1969–1977, 1982–1992, 1997–2006, 2008–2020); Virginia League (1942)

Major league affiliations
- Team: New York Yankees (2015–2020): Seattle Mariners (2008–2014); Toronto Blue Jays (2003–2006); Texas Rangers (1997–2002); Atlanta Braves (1982–1992); Philadelphia Phillies (1969–1977); Chicago Cubs (1957–1958); Philadelphia Phillies (1952–1955); Brooklyn Dodgers (1947–1949)

Minor league titles
- League titles (3): 1986; 1991; 2013
- Division titles (10): 1984; 1986; 1989; 1991; 1997; 1999; 2008; 2010; 2013; 2019

Team data
- Name: Pulaski Yankees (2015–2020); Pulaski Mariners (2008–2014); Pulaski Blue Jays (2003–2006); Pulaski Rangers (1997–2002); Pulaski Braves (1982–1992); Pulaski Phillies (1969–1977); Pulaski Cubs (1957–1958); Pulaski Phillies (1952–1955); Pulaski Counts (1942, 1946–1950)
- Ballpark: Calfee Park (1982–1992, 1997–2006, 2008–2020)

The Pulaski Yankees were a minor league baseball team based in Pulaski, Virginia, United States. They were an Advanced Rookie League team in the Appalachian League. The team played its home games at Calfee Park. They were affiliated with several Major League Baseball teams, including the New York Yankees in their final season.

The Pulaski Yankees were awarded Minor League Baseball's top honor, the John H. Johnson President's Award, in 2019. The award recognizes the "complete baseball franchise—based on franchise stability, contributions to league stability, contributions to baseball in the community, and promotion of the baseball industry."

The start of the 2020 season was postponed due to the COVID-19 pandemic before ultimately being cancelled on June 30. In conjunction with a contraction of Minor League Baseball beginning with the 2021 season, the Appalachian League was reorganized as a collegiate summer baseball league, and the Yankees franchise continued under a new name, the Pulaski River Turtles, in the revamped league designed for rising college freshmen and sophomores.

== Pulaski baseball history ==
- Pulaski Counts, 1942, 1946–1950
- Pulaski Phillies, 1952–1955, 1969–1977
- Pulaski Cubs, 1957–1958
- Pulaski Braves, 1982–1992
- Pulaski Rangers, 1997–2002
- Pulaski Blue Jays, 2003–2006
- Pulaski Mariners, 2008–2014
- Pulaski Yankees, 2015–2020

Pulaski's teams won the Appalachian League's championship in 1948, 1969, 1986, 1991 and 2013.

Pulaski was the 2010 Appalachian League Eastern Division Champion.

== Ballpark ==
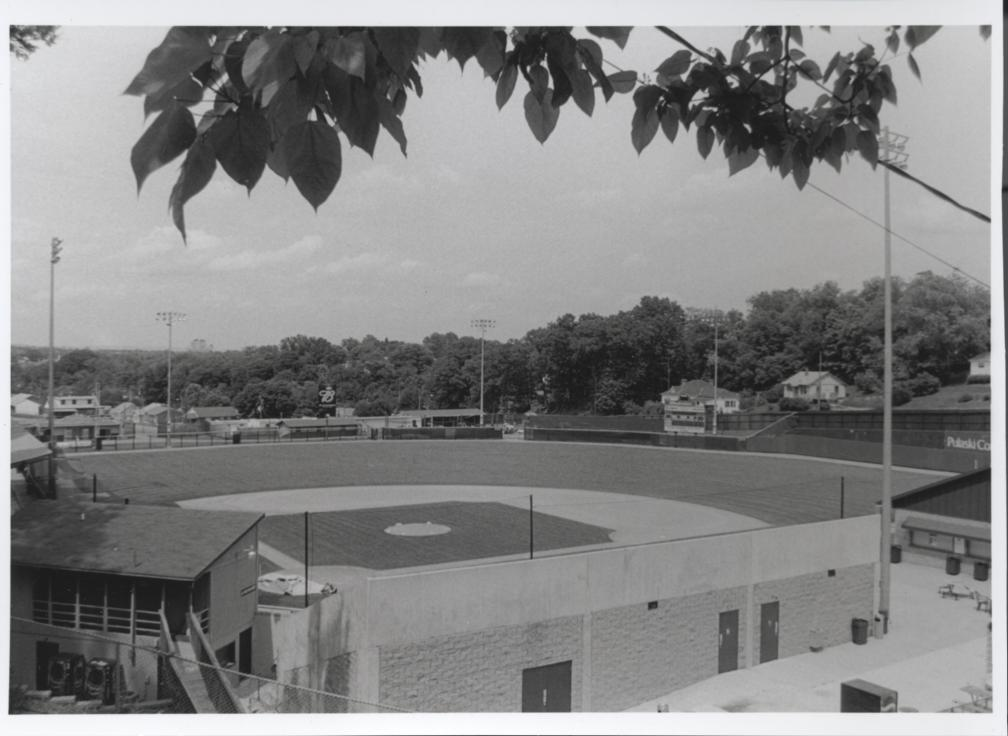
Photo of Calfee Park in 2005

The Pulaski Yankees played at Calfee Park. Calfee Park opened in 1935 and had a capacity of 3,200 fans. A number of houses that surround the park had good views of games.

The park had major renovations prior to the 1999 season, with a new grandstand behind the plate and along the first-base side as well as "open-air suites" (railed-in areas with picnic tables) farther down on the first-base line. A new scoreboard was also installed.

Since the Shelor Automotive Group purchased Calfee Park from the Town of Pulaski in 2015, ownership has completed numerous upgrades including a renovated home team clubhouse; a new visiting team clubhouse, concession stand, press box, and souvenir store; the addition of two VIP Towers, upgrading seating, and a 35’ x 22’ JumboTron; a Bermuda grass playing field and new irrigation system; construction of new home offices for ballpark employees; and the expansion of the upper concourse.

Most recently prior to the 2019 season, a three-tiered party deck and new boxes were added along the third base line, increasing the ballpark's capacity to 3,200. Additional upgrades including 800 new seats behind the party deck and new concessions points of sale were planned for 2020 before being put on hold due to the COVID-19 pandemic.

Calfee Park was voted the best rookie-level ballpark in America in 2019 and 2020 by a fan vote in Ballpark Digest's annual Best of the Ballparks competition.

== Playoffs ==
- 2019: Lost to Burlington 2–1 in semifinals.
- 2017: Defeated Bluefield 2–1 in semifinals; lost to Elizabethton 2–0 in finals.
- 2015: Lost to Princeton 2–1 in semifinals.
- 2013: Defeated Bluefield 2–0 in semifinals; defeated Greeneville 2–0 to win championship.
- 2010: Lost to Elizabethton 2–0 in semifinals.
- 2008: Lost to Elizabethton 2–0 in finals.
- 1999: Lost to Martinsville 2–0 in finals.
- 1997: Lost to Bluefield 2–0 in finals.
- 1991: Defeated Burlington 2–0 to win championship.
- 1989: Lost to Elizabethton 2–0 in finals.
- 1986: Defeated Johnson City 2–1 to win championship.
- 1984: Lost to Elizabethton 1–0 in finals.

== Notable Pulaski alumni ==
- Steve Avery (1988) MLB All-Star
- Jeff Blauser (1984) 2 x MLB All-Star
- Don Cardwell (1954)
- Larry Christenson (1972)
- Mark Clear (1974) 2 x MLB All-Star
- Julio Cruz (MGR, 1997)
- David Elder (1997)
- Jim Essian (1970)
- Tony Graffanino (1990)
- Dallas Green (1970, MGR) Manager: 1980 World Series Champion - Philadelphia Phillies
- Aaron Harang (1999)
- David Justice (1985) 3 x MLB All-Star; 1990 NL Rookie of the Year
- Mike Lamb (1997)
- Kameron Loe (2002)
- Colby Lewis (1999)
- Grady Little (MGR, 1986–1987)
- Javy López (1989) 3 x MLB All-Star
- Jerry Martin (1971)
- Kevin Mench (1999)
- Urban Meyer (1983) College Football Coach
- Travis Snider, Pulaski Blue Jays
- Jason Schmidt (1992) 3 x MLB All-Star
- Mike Stanton (1987) MLB All-Star
- Eugenio Vélez, Pulaski Blue Jays
- Turk Wendell (1988)
- C. J. Wilson (2001) 2 x MLB All-Star
- Mark Wohlers (1988-1989) MLB All-Star
- Zack Littell (2014)
- Anthony Volpe (2019) New York Yankees
