= Bristol State Liners =

Collegiate baseball team in Virginia

- Logo

Information
- League: Appalachian League
- Location: Bristol, Tennessee
- Ballpark: Pioneer Park (temporary)
- Founded: 2021
- Colors: Navy blue, red, white, cream, gray
- Ownership: Bristol Baseball, Inc. (BBI)
- Website: Official website

The Bristol State Liners are an inactive collegiate summer baseball team based in Bristol, Virginia and Bristol, Tennessee. They are a member of the Appalachian League, a collegiate summer league that operates in the Appalachian regions of Tennessee, Virginia, West Virginia, and North Carolina. The team is operated by a non-profit organization, Bristol Baseball, Incorporated (BBI). BBI had no full-time paid staff, instead relying on a volunteer board and general manager to keep and promote professional baseball in Bristol.

== Professional team ==
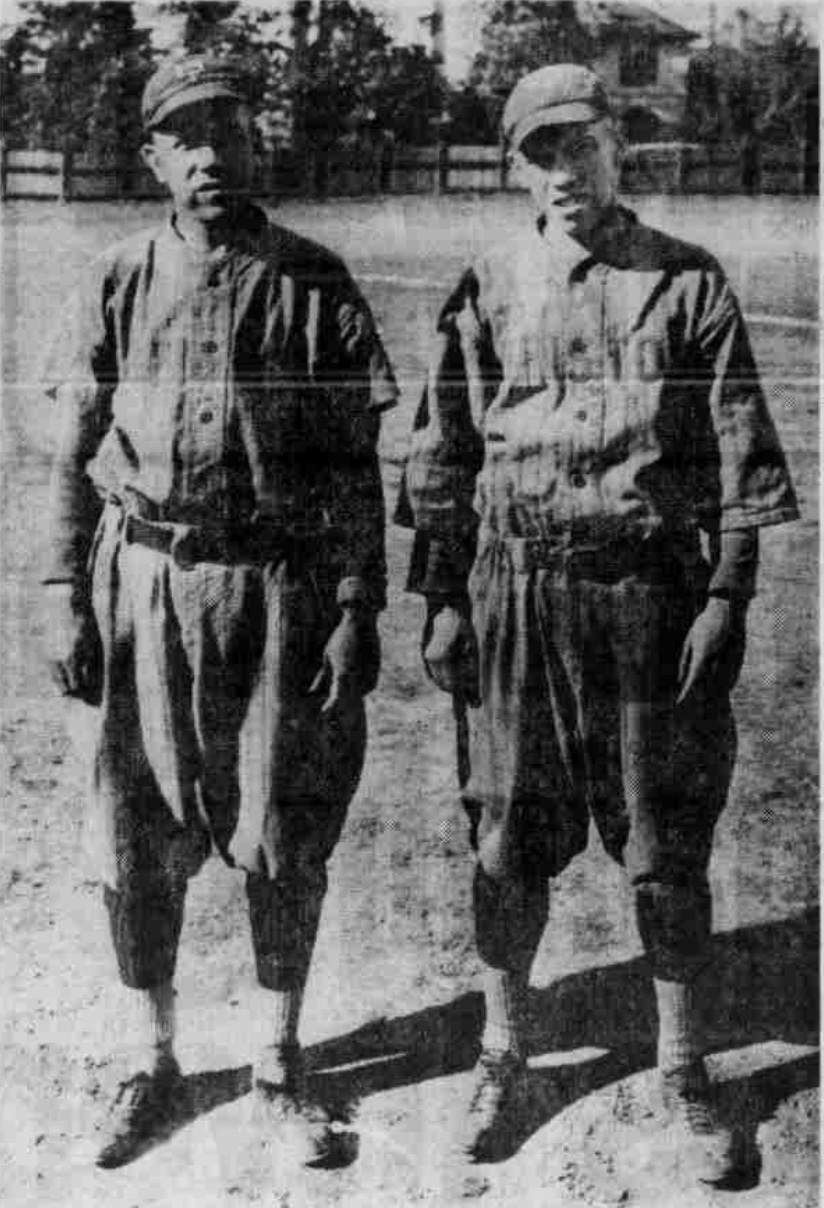
Patsy (L) and Joe O'Rourke (R) in 1924 with Bristol for which Patsy managed, and Joe Jr played infield

The original team played in the Appalachian League from 1921 to 1925. Since 1969 the franchise has been operated by Bristol Baseball, Incorporated (BBI). The organization was affiliated with the Pittsburgh Pirates, Chicago White Sox and Detroit Tigers as the Bristol Tigers, Bristol White Sox, and Bristol Pirates.

== Collegiate summer team ==
In conjunction with a contraction of Minor League Baseball beginning with the 2021 season, the Appalachian League was reorganized as a collegiate summer baseball league, and the Bristol Pirates were replaced by a new franchise in the revamped league designed for rising college freshmen and sophomores. On February 2, 2021 Bristol Baseball, Incorporated (BBI) revived the name Bristol State Liners. The nickname references the fact that the twin cities of Bristol, Virginia and Bristol, Tennessee are adjacent to one another, with the state line between the two running right down the center of State Street, their shared major downtown thoroughfare.

The State Liners were left off the Appalachian League schedule for 2026 while waiting for their new arena to be built.
