= Bristol Pirates =

- 1969–2020; Bristol, Virginia
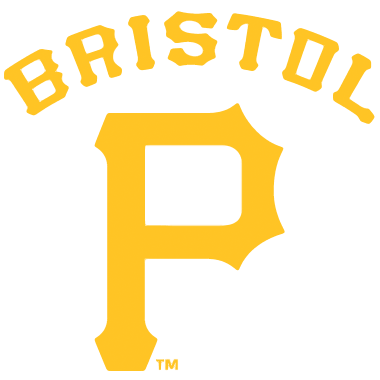
Team logo
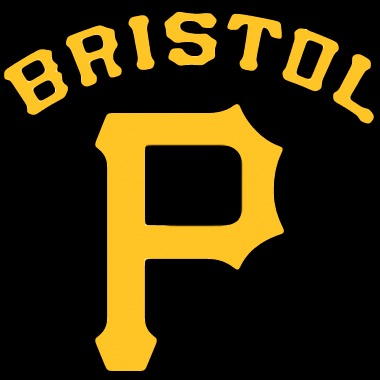
Cap insignia

Minor league affiliations
- Class: Rookie (1969–2020)
- League: Appalachian League (1969–2020)

Major league affiliations
- Team: Pittsburgh Pirates (2014–2020); Chicago White Sox (1995–2013); Detroit Tigers (1969–1994)

Minor league titles
- League titles (6): 1972; 1974; 1977; 1985; 1998; 2002
- Division titles (3): 1985; 1998; 2002

Team data
- Name: Bristol Pirates (2014–2020); Bristol White Sox (1995–2013); Bristol Tigers (1969–1994)
- Ballpark: Boyce Cox Field at DeVault Memorial Stadium (1969–2020)

The Bristol Pirates were a Minor League Baseball team in Bristol, Virginia, United States. They were a Rookie-level team in the Appalachian League.

The team played home games at DeVault Memorial Stadium. Opened in 1969, Devault Memorial Stadium held 2,000 fans. The team was previously affiliated with the Detroit Tigers, and a previous manager was retired Tigers manager Jim Leyland. They were a farm team of the Chicago White Sox from 1995 to 2013 as the Bristol White Sox.

The team was operated by a non-profit organization, Bristol Baseball, Incorporated (BBI). BBI had no full-time paid staff, instead relying on a volunteer board and general manager to keep and promote professional baseball in Bristol.

The start of the 2020 season was postponed due to the COVID-19 pandemic before ultimately being cancelled on June 30. In conjunction with a contraction of Minor League Baseball beginning with the 2021 season, the Appalachian League was reorganized as a collegiate summer baseball league, and the Pirates were replaced by a new franchise, the Bristol State Liners, in the revamped league designed for rising college freshmen and sophomores.

== Season-by-season records ==
Bristol Tigers (Appalachian League)
Year					
Year	Record	Win %	Finish*	Manager	Playoffs
1969	34-34	.500	3rd South	Bill Lajoie	none
1970	26-31	.464	5th AL	Al Lakeman	none
1971	31-35	.470	3rd South	Jim Leyland	none
1972	40-28	.588	1st AL	Joe Lewis	League Champs; No playoffs
1973	24-45	.348	7th AL	Joe Lewis	none
1974	52-17	.754	1st North	Joe Lewis	League Champs; No playoffs
1975	37-31	.544	3rd South	Joe Lewis	none
1976	35-32	.522	2nd South	Joe Lewis	none
1977	43-26	.614	2nd AL	Joe Lewis	League Champs; No playoffs
1978	35-34	.507	3rd AL	Joe Lewis	none
1979	19-50	.275	6th AL	Joe Lewis	none
1980	36-33	.522	2nd AL	Tom Kotchman	none
1981	29-41	.414	5th AL	Joe Lewis	none
1982	28-36	.438	3rd South	Boots Day	none
1983	34-38	.472	3rd AL	Boots Day	none
1984	37-33	.529	2nd South	Hal Dyer	none
1985	44-25	.638	1st AL	Tom Burgess	League Champs; No playoffs
1986	35-34	.507	3rd South	Tom Gamboa	
1987	20-49	.290	4th South	Rick Magnante	
1988	46-27	.630	2nd South	Rick Magnante	Lost 1 game playoff
1989	28-39	.418	5th South	Rubén Amaro, Sr.	
1990	22-46	.324	10th AL	Ken Cunningham	
1991	22-44	.333	5th South	Juan Lopez	
1992	33-35	.485	3rd South	Mark Wagner	
1993	28-39	.418	4th South	Ruben Amaro, Sr.	
1994	27-36	.429	4th South	Kevin Bradshaw	
Bristol White Sox (Appalachian League)
1995	28-39	.418	4th South	Chris Cron	
1996	17-51	.450	4th South	Nick Capra	
1997	30-38	.441	4th West	Nick Capra	
1998	42-24	.636	1st West	Nick Capra	League Champs
1999	45-24	.652	2nd West	Gary Pellant	
2000	34-33	.507	4th South	R.J. Reynolds	
2001	38-26	.594	2nd South	John Orton	
2002	43-25	.632	1st South	Nick Leyva	League Champs
2003	33-33	.500	6th AL	Jerry Hairston, Sr.	
2004	27-38	.415	5th West	Jerry Hairston, Sr.	
2005	30-36	.455	2nd West	Jerry Hairston, Sr.	
2006	22-42	.344	5th West	Nick Leyva	
2007	25-43	.368	4th West	Bobby Thigpen	
2008	34-30	.531	3rd West	Bobby Thigpen	
2009	27-39	.409	4th West	Ryan Newman	
2010	32-36	.471	3rd West	Ryan Newman	
2011	24-44	.353	5th West	Pete Rose Jr.	
2012	19-46	.292	5th West	Pete Rose Jr.	
2013	20-45	.308	5th West	Mike Gellinger	
Bristol Pirates (Appalachian League)
2014	22-46	.324	5th West	Edgar Varela	
2015	29-36	.446	4th West	Edgar Varela	
2016	25-43	.368	5th West	Kory DeHaan	
2017	17-49	.258	5th West	Miguel Perez	

== Playoffs ==
- 2019: Lost to Johnson City 2–1 in semifinals.
- 2002: Defeated Bluefield 2–1 to win championship.
- 1998: Defeated Princeton 2–0 to win championship.

== Notable alumni ==
- Chris Carter (2005)
- Frank Catalanotto (1992-1993)
- Tony Clark (1990) MLB All-Star
- Juan Encarnacion (1994)
- Mark Fidrych (1974) 2 x MLB All-Star; 1976 AL ERA Leader; 1976 AL Rookie of the Year
- Travis Fryman (1987) 5 x MLB All-Star
- Freddy Garcia (2009) 2 x MLB All-Star; 2001 AL ERA Leader
- Gio Gonzalez (2004) 2 x MLB All-Star
- Jerry Hairston Sr. (2004, MGR)
- Chris Hoiles (1986)
- Carlos Lee (1995)
- Jose Lima (1990) MLB All-Star
- Jerry Manual (1972)
- Lance Parrish (1974) 8 x MLB All-Star
- Jon Rauch (1999)
- Vern Ruhle (1972)
- Bobby Thigpen (2007-2008, MGR) MLB All-Star
- Justin Thompson (1991) MLB All-Star
- Alan Trammell (1976) 6 x MLB All-Star; 1984 World Series Most Valuable Player; 2018 Member of the Baseball Hall of Fame
- Tom Veryzer (1971)
- Lou Whitaker (1975) 5 x MLB All-Star; 1978 AL Rookie of the Year
