= L.A. Bounty =

1989 film by Worth Keeter

- Directed by: Worth Keeter
- Written by: Sybil Danning; Michael W. Leighton
- Produced by: Sybil Danning; Michael W. Leighton
- Starring: Sybil Danning; Wings Hauser; Henry Darrow; Lenore Kasdorf; Robert Hanley
- Cinematography: Gary Graver
- Edited by: Stewart Schill
- Music by: Howard Leese; John Sterling
- Production company: Noble Entertainment Group
- Distributed by: International Video Entertainment
- Release date: August 10, 1989
- Running time: 85 min
- Country: United States
- Language: English
- Budget: $2.2 million

L.A. Bounty is a 1989 American action thriller film directed by Worth Keeter, starring Sybil Danning, Wings Hauser, Henry Darrow, Lenore Kasdorf and Robert Hanley. Danning plays a vigilante ex-cop on the trail of a mayoral candidate, who has been abducted by the same psychopathic mobster (Hauser) responsible for the killing of her former partner. It was the actress' most significant attempt at a straightforward action franchise that would do away with her sex symbol image. A long-in-the-works sequel never materialized, making it her last feature starring role.

== Plot ==
Returning home late at night after a public function, Los Angeles mayoral candidate Mike Rhodes and his wife, Kelly, are attacked by a group of thugs. Mike gets kidnapped, but Kelly unmasks one of the assailants. She is shot at and saved by the late arrival of an armed woman, who kills two of the home invaders before disappearing. Mike gets taken to Gothic Imports, a business that serves a painting atelier and front for the criminal operation for Cavanaugh, a deranged kingpin who is responsible for the kidnapping, and doubles as an artist who hides his paintings from anyone. Upon learning that Kelly saw one of his men's face, Cavanaugh orders his en to return to her residence to kill here despite her being constantly accompanied by a police officer since the first attack.

Kelly and her guardian are ambushed inside a parking lot and the latter is killed. But the woman who had intervened during the kidnapping is still shadowing her, and once again dispatches Kelly's tormentors. She is Ruger, a loner and former narcotics cop who resigned from the force following a botched mission that saw her partner die at the hands of Cavanaugh. Today, the tough woman of few words works as a bounty hunter, and remains on the kingpin's trail. Ruger takes Kelly with her and gives a message for Cavanaugh to the last remaining assailants, telling the kingpin to call her. The upper class Kelly begrudgingly cohabitates with Ruger, although she is not impressed with her messy trailer. Meanwhile, the incumbent mayor Burrows summons veteran police lieutenant Chandler and presses him to identify both the mysterious vigilante and the kidnappers, as he is facing suspicion of taking out his rival. But appearances are not always what they seem.

== Cast ==
- Sybil Danning as Ruger
- Wings Hauser as Cavanaugh
- Henry Darrow as Lieutenant Chandler
- Lenore Kasdorf as Kelly Rhodes
- Robert Hanley as Mike Rhodes
- Van Quattro as Jackman
- Frank Doubleday as Rand
- Bob Minor as Martin
- J. Christopher Sullivan as Mayor Burrows
- Tegan West as Sergeant Perry
- Robert Quarry as Jimmy
- Blackie Dammett as James Maxwell
- Branscombe Richmond as Willis
- Frazer Smith as Newsman

== Production ==
In the spring of 1984, the press relayed Danning and manager S.C. Dacy's intention to make a film featuring a heroine in the mold of Dirty Harry that would serve as a role model for young women. At the time, that vehicle was Nemesis: Goddess of Revenge, and was supposed to be produced by Danning's agent Kenneth B. Johnston, with photography starting in September 1984. Amidst the controversy surrounding the publication of Miss America Vanessa Williams' nude pictures in Penthouse, an invitation was extended for Williams to become Danning's sidekick in Nemesis, which was now pitched as "Dirty Harry meets 48 Hrs." Nothing came of that version.

In 1985, International Video Entertainment hired the Austrian to host wraparound segments for old action films, repackaging them as a novelty line called Adventure Video. The tapes sold well, which allowed Danning to convince the distributor to provide financing for a new attempt at her vaunted vehicle. She retained a stake in the production through a new company, Adventuress Productions. The actress developed the storyline, while the screenplay was written by main producer Michael W. Leighton. Despite her personal involvement, Danning's dialogue was noted for its brevity, totaling less than fifty words across the entire picture. Confident that her fanbase would accept her decision, the Austrian also eschewed the nudity that had been a staple of her prior work (although ancillary characters did show their skin). This was in line with Danning and Dacy's prior contention that "[w]hether they are traditional heroes or new wave heroes, favorite action movie characters are basic 'no frills' models: no past, no future, no emotions, no dialogue... and no sex."

The main character was named after Ruger, a German firearms manufacturer. The film was supposed to feature a male loner serving as her counterpart. That role was intended for Steve James, who shot some pictures with Danning to promote the film. However, James was ultimately held up in South Africa by delays in the filming of American Ninja 3, and could not participate. As a result, the script was rewritten and the part intended for him was substituted with two separate characters, the mayor and a police detective.

By February 1988, filming was slated to begin in early spring, and no director had yet been announced. Photography was eventually reported underway in the August 21 edition of the Los Angeles Times. It was the Hollywood debut of Carolinas filmmaker Worth Keeter, who returned from Michael W. Leighton's recent shoot, Trapper County War. In total, the film took eighteen months to make and had a budget of $2.2 million.

== Release ==
=== Pre-release ===
The film was screened for industry professionals at the Cannes Film Market on May 13, 1989. According to Danning, L.A. Bounty was part of a five-film package sold to the U.S.S.R., which also included Sylvester Stallone and Arnold Schwarzenegger vehicles.

=== Theatrical ===
Contemporary press states that the film received a limited theatrical release in the U.S., although no specific information could be found about it at this time.

=== Home video ===
L.A. Bounty was released in the U.S. on VHS by International Video Entertainment on August 10, 1989. Earlier promotional material quoted a tentative date of August 24, 1989. IVE also issued the film on LaserDisc through disc-based media specialists Image Entertainment. The domestic release was narrowly preceded by the film's U.K. bow through Guild Home Video. In Australia, the film was released on April 25, 1990, as L.A. Bounty Hunter, via distributor Virgin Vision. The Sydney Morning Herald's video rental charts for week one of May 1990 had the film in 13th place.

There is no DVD release of L.A. Bounty on record. In April 2022, sales company California Films announced that they had commissioned a new 4K master of the movie. A Blu-ray from Scorpion Releasing, under license from MGM, reached stores on November 8, 2022. That disc apparently did not benefit from the aforementioned new scan.

== Reception ==
L.A. Bounty received mixed-to-negative reviews from critics. Variety pundit Lor. called it a "lame action vehicle" and an "uninvolving opus" which "includes lots of filler." He also found Danning unconvincing in her attempt to espouse a Clint Eastwood type persona. Larry Patten of the Wisconsin State Journal wrote that although it "seemingly contains all the right stuff for a low-key B-movie: crime, revenge, action, passion", it proved to be "a flaccid film with cardboard criminals, ambiguous revenge, static action and zero passion." David O'Callaghan of the South Wales Evening Post dismissed the film as "corny, predictable, blood-and-guts stuff with incessant gunfire that unfortunately fails to drown the despairing dialogue". Joe Kane of the New York Daily News judged that, while the film offers "the usual quota of loud shootouts, car chases and narrow escapes", "it is [Hauser's] extravagantly loony performance that prevents this otherwise totally routine time-killer from sinking into a sea of terminal ennui". Sister publications The Motion Picture Annual and TV Guide were most negative, writing that Danning "provides a stiff, unconvincing female alternative to Clint Eastwood" and that "[a]lthough it is nicely photographed, the story is so predictable, choppy, and badly directed that the film is never entertaining.

A few reviewers granted that L.A. Bounty was an upgrade compared to the usual Danning fodder. Writing in The Missoulian, Mike McNally thought the film signified that Danning "is back" and showed "sign[s] of artistic maturity". Tim Fernandez of the U.K.'s Southport Visiter concurred, finding the film less limiting than "some of the trash she has appeared in (Chained Heat, Howling II)", and "perhaps her most complete to date". Marcia Froelke Coburn of the Chicago Tribune wrote that L.A. Bounty showed Danning at "her most unconquerable best". The Age of Melbourne was perhaps most favorable: dissenting with Variety and TV Guide, its critic Jim Murphy claimed that Clint Eastwood "would be proud" of the way Danning appropriated his persona, and Keeter emulated Sergio Leone's style during the movie lot shootout.

== Planned sequel ==
Although she does not own the film, Danning kept the rights to the Ruger character, and she has touted a sequel ever since the first installment. Photographer Dan Golden was commissioned to shoot a promotional portfolio featuring Danning and Steve James who, after missing out on the first film, was again due to co-star. However, James died an untimely death, which may have contributed to the sequel never coming to fruition, although Danning's poor management was cited as a likelier reason. The sequel was tentatively titled Ruger: L.A. Bounty 2. In 2019, the actress mentioned that she had held talks with a Toronto-based company about a possible Ruger series, and that she was looking for a partner in the venture.

== Other media ==
=== Comic book ===
To help promote their putative L.A. Bounty sequel, Danning and her team announced a comic book based on that film's script. In 1994, the two-part miniseries was in the works at Alpha Productions under the title Concrete Storm, adapted by Ron Fortier and penciled by Paul Pelletier. It featured the likenesses of Danning and Steve James as a character named Major Washington Lyons, who retained the actor's features after his death. As the film sequel fell into limbo, so did the comic book, although Danning sporadically mentioned talks to resurrect the project, including with Top Cow.

A different version of the comic did surface as just Ruger in 2015, under the smaller Scare Tactix Graphix imprint. It was written by Danning, drawn by G.W. Fisher and penciled by Scott Ethan Ambruson. In a 2017 interview, Danning indicated that Stephen B. Scott had contributed to the art, although he does not appear to be credited.

=== Cancelled video game ===
A video game based on the Ruger character was announced during E3 2011. Although few details ever surfaced, it was pitched as a pioneering cloud-based title. It was primarily the work of a Las Vegas-based developer named Les Thomas, and a Kickstarter crowdfunding campaign was also considered. It was met with skepticism by the gaming press, and never materialized.
