= House of mirrors =

Traditional attraction

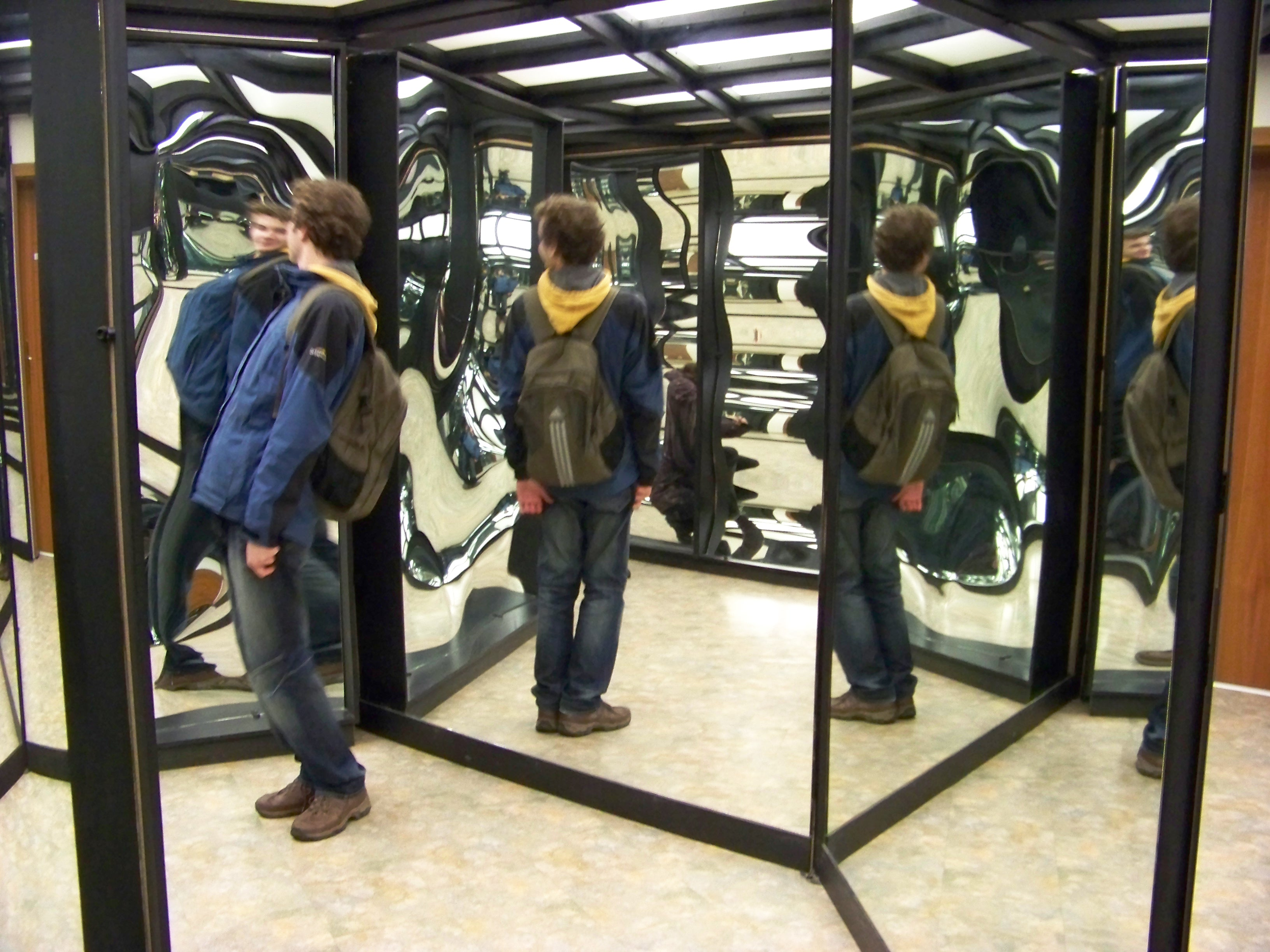
A house of mirrors in the Czech Republic

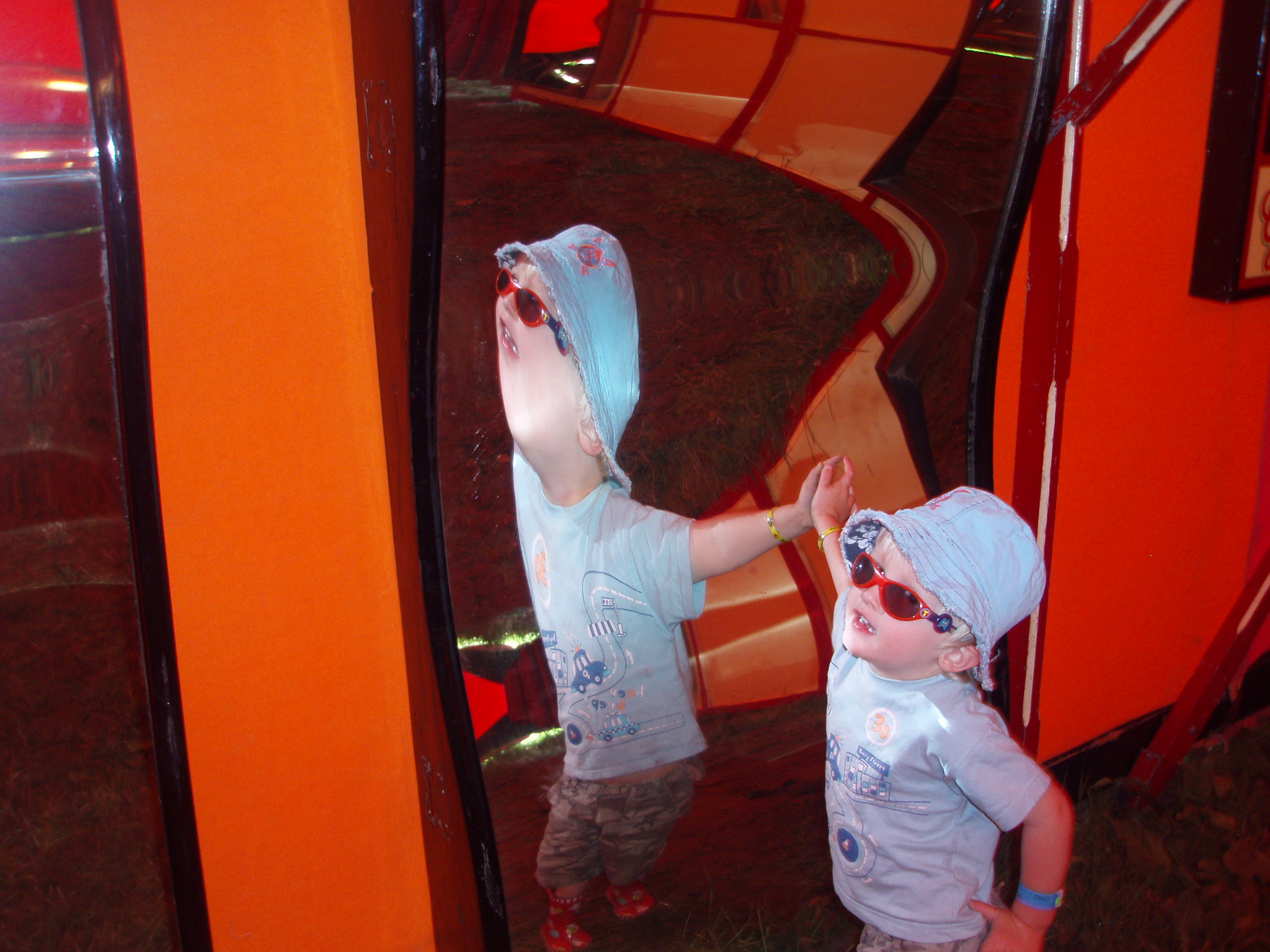
House of mirrors in Carters Steam Fair 2009

A house of mirrors or hall of mirrors is a traditional attraction at funfairs (carnivals) and amusement parks. It is a maze-like puzzle (made out of a myriad of mirrors). In addition to the maze, participants are also given mirrors as obstacles, and glass panes to parts of the maze they cannot yet get to. Sometimes the mirrors may be distorted because of different curves, convex, or concave in the glass to give the participants unusual and confusing reflections of themselves, some humorous and others frightening.

== References in fiction ==
=== Literary ===
The first known literary example is in Gaston Leroux's novel The Phantom of the Opera (1911), in which Erik has built one for the Shah of Persia as a trap and later uses a similar trap house to protect his lair from his enemies.

A (possibly magical) house of mirrors features prominently in Ray Bradbury's novel Something Wicked This Way Comes.

The concept has also been used in comics. In Batman: The Dark Knight Returns, Batman is seen chasing the Joker through an amusement park and into a hall of mirrors. The Joker is unable to clearly decipher what is real and what is just an image.

=== Film ===
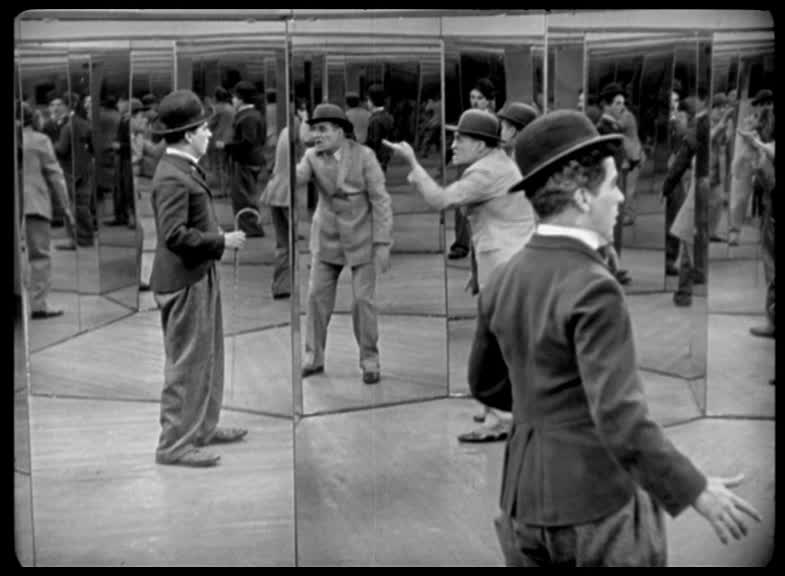
Chaplin being confronted in a mirror maze in The Circus

In Charlie Chaplin's 1928 movie The Circus, Chaplin is chased into a mirror maze by a thief and the police.

The climax of the 1947 Orson Welles film The Lady from Shanghai takes place in a maze of mirrors.

In the finale of Enter the Dragon (1973), Bruce Lee's character navigates a mirror maze by breaking through the mirrors.

Francisco Scaramanga's "Fun House" in the 1974 James Bond film The Man with the Golden Gun has a house of mirrors.

In John Boorman's 1974 movie Zardoz, character "Z" (Sean Connery) battles against "The Vortex" in a mirror maze.

The 1983 Walt Disney movie Something Wicked This Way Comes (an adaptation of Ray Bradbury's novel of the same title) culminates in a house of mirrors confrontation.

The 1984 movie Conan the Destroyer with Arnold Schwarzenegger contains a house of mirrors fight.

In Dariush Farhang’s 1985 movie “The Spell” is a house of mirrors.

Woody Allen's movie Manhattan Murder Mystery (1993) makes reference to the house of mirrors sequence from The Lady from Shanghai.

In Minions (2015), Bob the Minion enters a room of mirrors at Stacy's Department Store, thinking his reflections are his friends. Kevin the Minion finds Bob in the room of mirrors and gives him his teddy bear, Tim, which Bob had forgotten on his way to the store.

In John Wick: Chapter 2 (2017), John Wick (Keanu Reeves) engages in a chase, gunfight, and climactic knife fight in a modern art museum exhibit called "Reflections of the Soul" made of halls, rooms, and stairways lined with mirrors.

A house of mirrors features prominently in Jordan Peele's 2019 horror film Us.

=== Music ===
The Kraftwerk album Trans-Europe Express includes a song called "The Hall of Mirrors". Fusion guitarist Allan Holdsworth also has a song called "House of Mirrors" of his Hard Hat Area album. The Insane Clown Posse album The Ringmaster has a song called "House of Mirrors", representing it as one of the attractions of the Dark Carnival.

=== Television ===
In Season 3, Episode 7 of Stranger Things, the character "Hopper" (David Harbour) leads a Russian assassin into a mirror maze.

In an episode of the Twilight Zone, "In Praise of Pip", a bookie tries to tell his dying son how much he loves him while chasing him inside a house of mirrors.

Other notable examples include the CBS soap opera Guiding Light which, in 1980, featured a now famous sequence that depicted heroine Rita Bauer (Lenore Kasdorf) being pursued through a hall of mirrors by villain Roger Thorpe (Michael Zaslow); the show Macgyver, where Jack Dalton is brainwashed and is forced to fire on Macgyver; and Teen Titans episode "Betrayal".

In "The Carnival Job", a fourth season episode of the show Leverage, Elliot has a showdown with Molly's captors in a house of mirrors.

In the Pretty Little Liars: Original Sin episode, "Carnival of Souls" not only it was featured in the 1999 opening flashback but also the present day scene. The flashback depicts Angela and Elodie in a clandestine relationship and the present day scene shows Mouse lured by A.

== History ==
The origins of the house of mirrors stem from the hall of mirrors in the Palace of Versailles.

Gustav Castan patented a mirror maze in several countries between 1888 and 1895. In his words:

The primary object of my invention is to provide such an arrangement of mirrors in a room or inclosure as shall cause them, by their reflection of objects suitably located with relation to the mirrors, to present to the vision of a person in the apartment the illusion of a labyrinthian device composed of seemingly endless passages, which appear to him to be freely traversable until he is stopped in his course by an obstructing mirror, from which long passages seem to extend to the right and to the left.

Sydney's Strand Arcade hosted an amusement called The Crystal Maze in 1893, an "illusive arrangement of mirrors" which gave the illusion of gardens appearing to "contain innumerable people, the visitors and the attendants being multiplied by hundreds."

== See also ==
- Curved mirror
- Escape room
- List of amusement rides
- Musée Grévin
