= Christina Hart =

Actress, director, producer

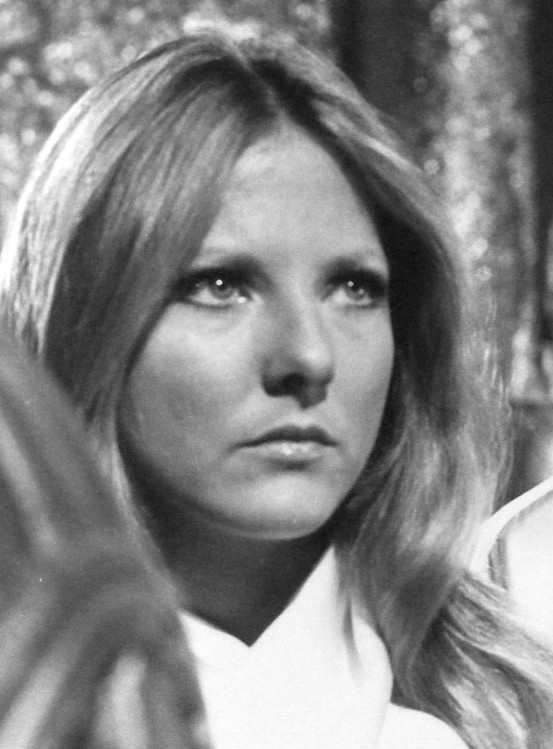
- Hart in The Fantastic Journey, 1977
- Born: 1949 (age 76–77); Lock Haven, Pennsylvania, U.S.
- Occupations: Actress, film producer, film director, playwright
- Years active: 1969–present
- Spouse(s): Frank Doubleday (m. 197?; died 2018)
- Children: Kaitlin Doubleday; Portia Doubleday

Christina Hart (born 1949) is an American film producer, film director, playwright and retired actress. She teaches acting at the Hollywood Court Theater.

She has appeared in such films as The Stewardesses (1969), The Mad Bomber (1973) and Charley Varrick (1973).

== Life and career ==
Christina Hart was born in 1949 in Lock Haven, Pennsylvania, to an elementary school teacher father. She has been acting professionally since 1958 in television and motion pictures, although she has stated that her true passion is for the theater. She formed DOXA Productions with actress Kara Pulcino, and has produced and directed under that label since 2006.

She was married to actor Frank Doubleday for over 40 years, until his death in 2018. The couple has two daughters, actresses Kaitlin and Portia Doubleday.

== Theater ==
As a playwright, Hart is most known for Women Over the Influence and Birds of a Feather, and was nominated for an LA Stage Alliance Ovation Award for Best Original Play in 2012. She has directed over 50 plays.

== Filmography ==
- The Stewardesses (1969) as Samantha
- The Woman and Bloody Terror (1970) as Karen Washington
- Red Sky at Morning (1971) as Velva Mae Cloyd
- The Roommates (1973) as Paula
- The Mad Bomber (1973) as Fromley's Victim
- Charley Varrick (1973) as Jana
- The Bunny Caper (aka Sex Play, Games Girls Play) (1974) as Bunny O'Hara
- The Daughters of Joshua Cabe Return (1975) as Charity
- The Runaway Barge (1975) as Reba Washburn
- Keep Off My Grass! (1975)
- Johnny Firecloud (1975) as June
- Addie and the King of Hearts (1976) as Kathleen Tate
- Dead of Night (1977) as Helen
- Mean Dog Blues (1978) as Gloria Kinsman
- The Night the City Screamed (1980) as Woman in Elevator
- The Sophisticated Gents (1981) as Gerda
- Hear No Evil (1982) as Sheila Green
- The Check Is in the Mail... (1986) as Janet

=== Television ===
- Ironside (1972) as Jan Ritter
- The Bold Ones: The New Doctors (1972) as Jan Ritter
- Can Ellen Be Saved? (1974) as Mary
- Shazam! (1974) as Holly
- The Rookies (1974) as Lorna Marsh
- Petrocelli (1974) as Niki James
- The Odd Couple (1975) as Susan
- The Texas Wheelers (1975) as Librarian
- The Blue Knight (1976) as Kiki
- Helter Skelter (1976) as Patricia "Katie" Krenwinkel
- Happy Days (1974–1976) as Carole Actman/Kitty
- Charlie's Angels (1976) as Billie
- C.P.O. Sharkey (1977) as Helen
- The Six Million Dollar Man (1977) as Margaret
- The Fantastic Journey (1977) as Gwenith
- The Streets of San Francisco (1977) as Nancy Telson
- Three's Company (1977) as Karen
- Hawaii Five-O (1977) as Chris Harmon
- Barnaby Jones (1976–1978) as Amanda/Jenna Smith
- David Cassidy: Man Undercover (1978) as Bobbi
- The Incredible Hulk (1979) as Cassie Floyd
- The Runaways (1979) as Jeanne Norris
- Detective School (1979) as Yolanda
- B. J. and the Bear (1980, Season 2, Episode 26, "Bear Bondage") as Janet Lockwood
- The Love Boat (1981) as Cindy Sterling
- Three's Company (1977–1981) as Francesca Angelino/Karen
- Dynasty (1981) as Bedelia
- CHiPs (1982, Season 5, Episode 17, "Alarmed") as Toni Sykes
- Hear No Evil (1982 made-for-TV-movie) as Sheila Green
- Simon & Simon (1982) as Stewardess April
- Airwolf (1985) as Mrs. Cove
- Murder, She Wrote (1989) as Sister Maria
