= Southern West Virginia King's Warriors =

King's Warriors
- Full name: Southern West Virginia King's Warriors
- Nickname: King's Warriors
- Founded: 2012
- Dissolved: 2017
- Ground: East River Soccer Complex; Bluefield, West Virginia
- Capacity: 1,500
- Owner: The Nehemiah Group, Inc.
- Head Coach: John Miglarese
- League: Premier Development League
- 2016: 4th, South Atlantic Division; Playoffs: DNQ
- Website: www.wvkingswarriors.org
Home colors	Away colors

Southern West Virginia King's Warriors was an American soccer club based in Forest Hill, West Virginia. The King's Warriors played in the South Atlantic Division of the Premier Development League.

== About ==
The club is "a Christian sports ministry of The Nehemiah Group, Inc." and is affiliated with Countryside Baptist Church in Forest Hill, West Virginia.

== Stadium ==
King's Warriors home matches were played at the East River Soccer Complex in Bluefield. They also played at the YMCA Paul Cline Memorial Youth Sports Complex in Beckley for the 2012 and 2013 seasons.

== Year-by-year ==
Year	Division	League	Regular season	Playoffs	Open Cup
2012	4	USL PDL	8th, South Atlantic	Did not qualify	Did not qualify
2013	4	USL PDL	6th, South Atlantic	Did not qualify	Did not qualify
2014	4	USL PDL	3rd, South Atlantic	Did not qualify	Did not qualify
2015	4	USL PDL	3rd, South Atlantic	Did not qualify	Did not qualify
2016	4	USL PDL	4th, South Atlantic	Did not qualify	Did not qualify

== Head coaches ==
- (United States) Scott Reitnour (2012–2014)
- (United States) John Miglarese (2014–2016)
