= Mercer Mall =

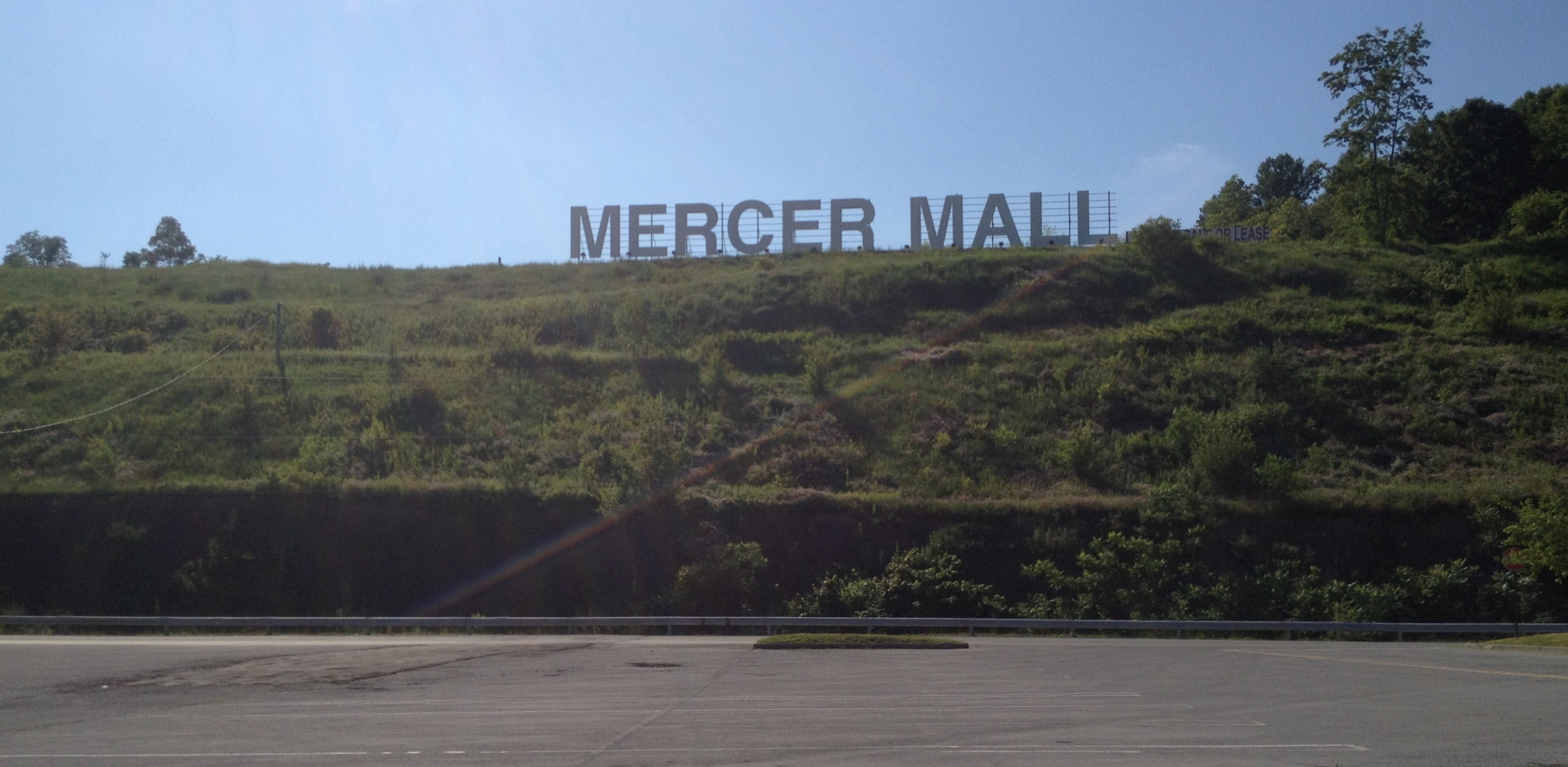
- Sign for Mercer Mall, June 2013
- Location: Bluefield, West Virginia
- Coordinates: 37.29704°N 81.16782°W
- Address: 261 Mercer Mall Road
- Opened: 1980
- Developer: Homart Development Company and Zamias Services, Inc.
- Owner: Ershig Properties
- Num. of stores: 70
- Num. of anchor tenants: 5
- Floor area: 660,783 square feet (61,000 m^{2})
- Floors: 1

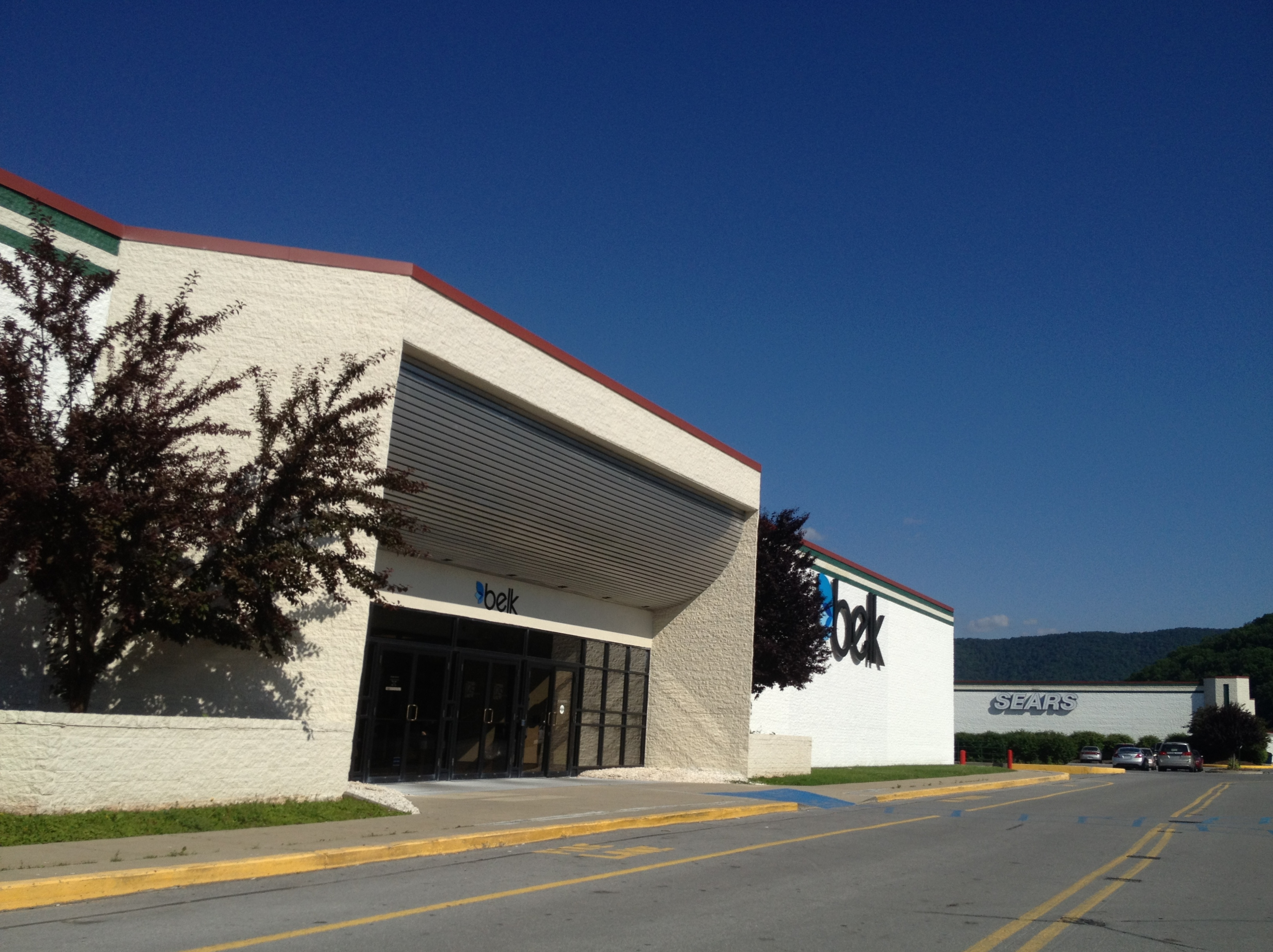
Exterior view of Mercer Mall, June 2013

Mercer Mall is a shopping mall serving Bluefield, West Virginia. Opened in 1980, the mall features J. C. Penney, Belk, Roses, Rural King, and Hobby Lobby, Five Below and seventy other store areas. It is managed by Ershig Properties.

== History ==
Although the facility boasts about 70 stores inside the mall, only about 35 stores are currently in operation inside the facility.

When it first opened in 1980, Mercer Mall had Sears, J. C. Penney, Montgomery Ward, Stone & Thomas, and Leggett (now Belk). The Montgomery Ward closed in 1987, and the space became a Hills, which was sold to Ames in 1999. Stone & Thomas was sold to Elder-Beerman in 1998, but Elder-Beerman opted not to continue with the Bluefield store. Instead, Belk purchased the store and took the space for men's wear and home goods.

Carmike Cinemas operated a theater in a separate building at the mall until 2016 when AMC Theaters announced it would take over the space. On February 27, 2023 AMC Classic Theater announced its closure. In May 2023 a new business called Golden Ticket Cinema acquired the space, with an opening date yet to be announced.

After Ames closed in 2000, the space became Carolina Pottery, which closed in 2006 and became Steve & Barry's. The space then became Roses in 2009 following the closure of Steve & Barry's. Belk later closed the second store, which became a Hobby Lobby in 2014. Also in 2014, Sears announced the closing of the Mercer Mall store. Rural King opened in the former Sears space at the mall on February 18, 2017.

In October 2024, it was announced that Five Below would be taking over in the old FYE (retailer) location, opening in November 2024.
