= Bluefield Rams =

- University: Bluefield University
- Association: NAIA
- Conference: AAC (primary)
- Athletic director: Corey Mullins
- Location: Bluefield, Virginia
- Varsity teams: 14 (7 men's, 6 women's, 1 co-ed)
- Football stadium: Mitchell Stadium
- Basketball arena: Dome Gymnasium
- Baseball stadium: Bowen Field
- Softball stadium: Graham Rec Park
- Soccer stadium: East River Soccer Complex
- Tennis venue: Bluefield City Courts
- Other venues: Fincastle on the Mountain
- Nickname: Rams
- Colors: Bluefield Navy and Bluefield Red
- Website: burams.com
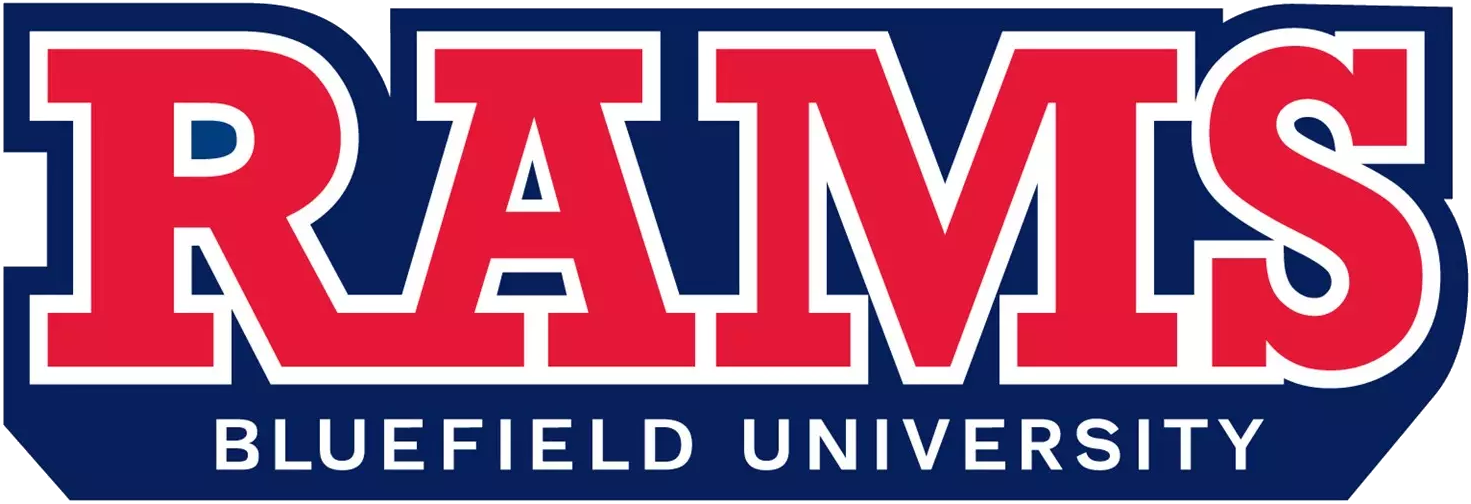

The Bluefield Rams are the athletic teams that represent Bluefield University, located in Bluefield, Virginia, in intercollegiate sports as a member of the National Association of Intercollegiate Athletics (NAIA), primarily competing in the Appalachian Athletic Conference (AAC) for most of their sports since the 2014–15 academic year (which they were a member on a previous stint from 2001–02 to 2011–12); while its football team competes in the Mid-South Conference (MSC) since the 2014 fall season.

They were also a member of the National Christian College Athletic Association (NCCAA), primarily competing as an independent in the Mid-East Region of the Division I level until after the 2019–20 school year to fully align with the NAIA. The Rams previously competed in the Mid-South as a full member from 2012–13 to 2013–14. Athletes make up about 60% of the student population at Bluefield. It served as host for the NCCAA Softball National Championship.

== Varsity teams ==
Bluefield competes in 14 intercollegiate varsity sports:

Men's sports	Women's sports
Baseball	Basketball
Basketball	Golf
Football	Soccer
Golf	Softball
Soccer	Track and field
Track and field	Volleyball
Volleyball	
Co-ed sports
Esports

=== Basketball ===
The Bluefield Rams men's basketball team was often nationally ranked between 2007 and 2009 under head coach Jason Gillespie. In the 2008–09 season, the Rams won 27 games, including an 18–0 mark in AAC conference play and a regular season championship, but fell in the conference tournament to then-rival King University by one point, finishing the season ranked seventh in NAIA Division II. Guard/forward Omar Reed went on to play professionally with the San Antonio Spurs' NBA Development League affiliate, with the Boston Celtics organization, as well as internationally in Europe and Japan.

=== Baseball ===
The Bluefield Rams baseball team won its first NCCAA Division I national championship in 2009 and followed with a school-record 41 wins in 2010 before losing in the NCCAA World Series finals to North Greenville. In 2007 they were the NCCAA Mid-East Regional Champs, and made their fourth NCCAA World Series appearance in 2014. Current head coach Mike White has won over 500 games with Bluefield and has sent multiple players to professional baseball. The Rams play their home games at Bowen Field. As of 2026, nineteen former Bluefield baseball players have gone on to play professionally.

=== Football ===
Bluefield fielded a football program from 1922 to 1941, but had not had a football program since the attack on Pearl Harbor. On June 4, 2011, Bluefield University announced the return of a football program under head coach Mike Gravier, beginning with "club football" season in 2011, and began play in the NAIA in 2012. The school hired Ordell Walker as the program's new head coach in 2013, and the Rams earned their first win since the program's return with a 46–24 defeat of the Apprentice Builders in Newport News, Va., on September 13, 2014. The Rams play their home games in 10,000-seat Mitchell Stadium.

=== Cross country ===
Bluefield hired Coach Travis Yoder in 2014 to build a cross country and track and field program from ground zero. In his first year as head coach he had the schools first NCCAA national qualifier in school history (Kendall Haynes). After his first year Coach Travis Yoder left Bluefield. Bluefield then hired Coach Kendall Haynes to Coach cross country and is now building a track and field program as well. During Coach Haynes's first year in 2017 he had the schools first girls NCCAA national qualifiers in school history (Kenize Marshall and Jordyn O'Saben).

== Facilities ==
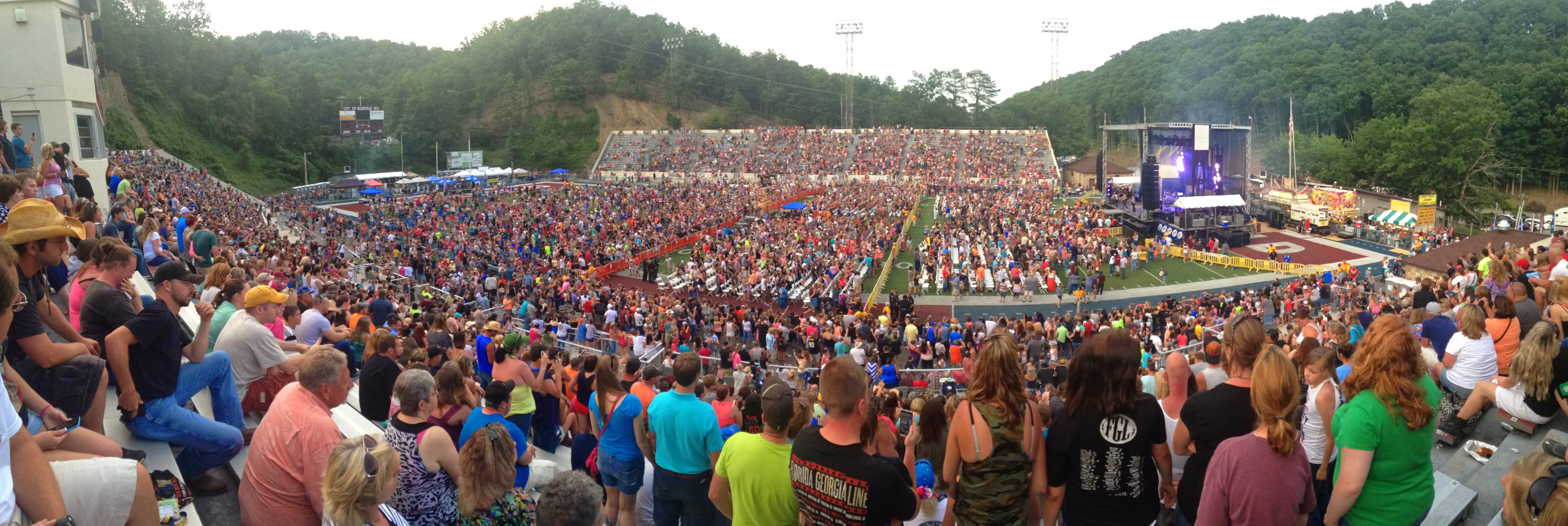
Mitchell Stadium

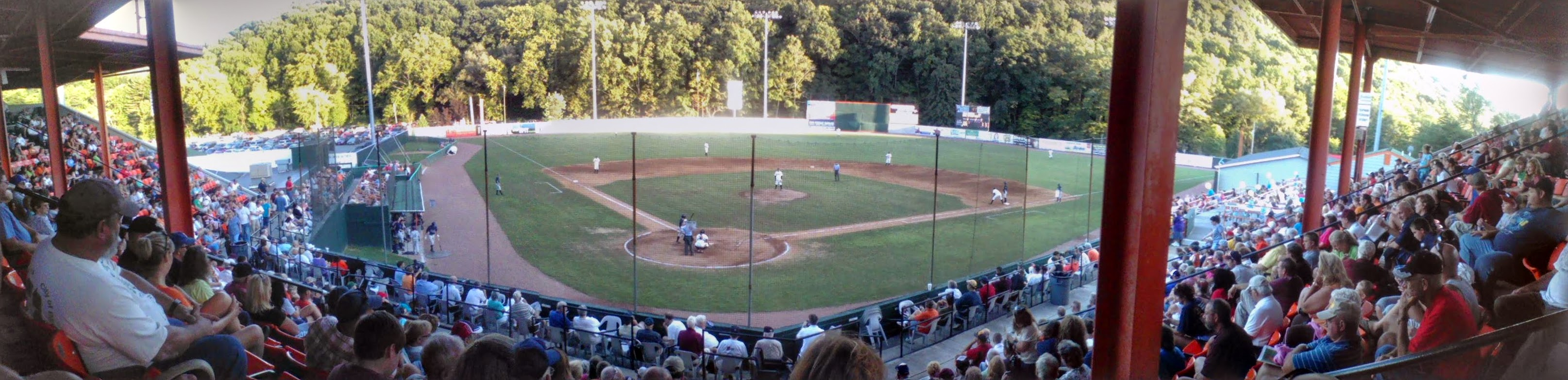
Bowen Field

Venue	Sport(s)	Ref.
Mitchell Stadium	Football	
Bowen Field (Note: Not owned by the university but by the city of Bluefield.)	Baseball	
Graham Recreation Park	Softball	
East River Soccer Complex (Note: Not owned by the university. Operated by the East River Soccer Association.)	Soccer	
Dome Gymnasium	Basketball; Volleyball	
Bluefield City Courts	Tennis	
Fincastle on the Mountain	Golf	
Herb Sims Wellness Center	(football training)	

== Achievements ==
In 2009, Bluefield won the NCCAA Baseball National Championship.
