= Nervous Ticks (film) =

- Theatrical release poster
- Directed by: Rocky Lang
- Written by: David Frankel
- Produced by: Arthur Goldblatt
- Starring: Bill Pullman; Julie Brown; Peter Boyle
- Cinematography: Bill Dill
- Edited by: Cari Coughlin
- Music by: Jay Ferguson
- Production company: Grandview Avenue Pictures
- Distributed by: Arrow Releasing
- Release dates: March 1992 (Santa Barbara Film Festival); September 3, 1993 (United States)
- Running time: 95 minutes
- Country: United States
- Language: English

Nervous Ticks is a 1992 American romantic comedy film directed by Rocky Lang and written by David Frankel. The film stars Bill Pullman as York Daley, who finds out from his mistress that she had confessed their affair to her husband.

== Premise ==
Man finds out from his mistress that she had confessed their affair to her husband who went to man's home to kill him. The man wants to avoid any conflict, but the mistress has an opposite plan. A long night has just begun.

== Cast ==
- Bill Pullman as York Daley
- Julie Brown as Nancy Rudman
- Peter Boyle as Ron Rudman
- Brent Jennings as Cole
- James Le Gros as Rusty
- Paxton Whitehead as Cheshire
- Josh Mostel as Saul Warshow
- Cathy Ladman as Sonya Warshow
- Gerald Papasyan as Seve
- Nancy Fish as Mrs. Fennel
- Claire Stansfield as Lu
- Zoe Trilling as Marci
- Lauren Lane as Blonde
- Prince Hughes as Ned
- Lenore Kasdorf as Katie
- Kerry Michales as Millicent
- David Spielberg as Mr. Reynolds
- Kim Walker as Janice

== Release ==
Nervous Ticks had its world premiere at the Santa Barbara Film Festival in March 1992. The film was theatrically released in the United States on September 3, 1993. The film was released to VHS by Columbia TriStar Home Video on September 15, 1993.

== Production ==
Nervous Ticks was filmed in Southern California, Los Angeles, and Phoenix, around February 4 to April 1 on 1991.
