= Attached =

- Star Trek: The Next Generation episode
- Episode no.: Season 7 Episode 8
- Directed by: Jonathan Frakes
- Written by: Nick Sagan
- Production code: 260
- Original air date: November 8, 1993

Guest appearances
- Robin Gammell as Mauric; Lenore Kasdorf as Lorin; James Castle Stevens as Kes aide

Episode chronology
← Previous "Dark Page"	Next → "Force of Nature"
- Star Trek: The Next Generation season 7

"Attached" is the 160th episode of the American science fiction television series Star Trek: The Next Generation. The eighth episode of the seventh season. This explores the relationships between two cultures on an exoplanet, and between Crusher and Picard.

Set in the 24th century, the series follows the adventures of the Starfleet crew of the Federation starship Enterprise-D. In this episode, Captain Picard and Dr. Crusher escape imprisonment on an alien world then discover that their thoughts are connected by brain implants.

== Plot ==
Captain Picard and Dr. Crusher prepare to look into a diplomatic request from the Kes, one of the planet Kesprytt's two societies, who want entrance into the Federation. This is unprecedented because the planet's other society, the Prytt, wish no contact with the Federation or anyone else. Worf attempts to transport Crusher and Picard to the Kes, but they end up in a Prytt prison cell, where strange electronic devices are implanted in their necks. Minister Lorin of the Prytt informs Picard and Crusher that they are being held because of suspected conspiracy with the Kes and that the devices in their necks will reveal the truth. Back aboard the Enterprise, Riker sets up a meeting with Kes Ambassador Mauric to address the abduction. Meanwhile, Beverly mysteriously receives her tricorder hidden in a tray of food. She notices that a map has been added to her directory and, sensing it may come from the Kes, she and Picard use it to escape.

Riker, Worf, and Deanna Troi meet with Ambassador Mauric, who tells them that since they have no formal relations with the Prytt, their best option is to insert a rescue team into the Prytt capital city. Meanwhile, Picard and Crusher follow the tricorder map through a maze of caverns where fireballs explode around them.

The Enterprise is contacted by Lorin, who refuses to discuss Picard and Crusher and threatens an attack if Riker does not cease communications with her people. Even though Worf's analysis shows that the Prytt weapons are no danger to the Enterprise, Riker is at a loss until Mauric informs him that Picard and Crusher have been released by a Kes operative and are on their way to the Kes border. Meanwhile, Picard and Crusher realize that the implants in their necks allow them to read each other's thoughts—whether they want to or not. When they separate to regain privacy, both are hit with nausea that renders them incapable of being apart.

When two Prytt troopers appear in their path, they backtrack to ensure their safety. Mauric learns that the pair have not arrived at their destination and summons Riker and Worf to accuse them of conspiring with the Prytt. Riker assures him that this is not the case, but Mauric insists on leaving the Enterprise. Later, Picard and Crusher stop to rest for the night. Still able to hear each other's thoughts, they realize that there is not only a strong attraction between them—but Picard was once in love with Crusher but suppressed his feelings because of his friendship with her late husband Jack, and then later due to guilt over Jack's death under his command.

Determined to prove Mauric wrong and save his crew mates, Riker transports Lorin aboard the starship against her will. He sits down with Mauric and Lorin, but neither seems to care about Picard or Crusher. Disgusted, Riker tells Mauric that, based on what he has seen, the Kes will be denied entrance into the Federation. He then tells Lorin that if anything happens to Picard and/or Crusher, the Prytt will be inundated by a flood of information requests from Starfleet investigators. At that moment, Picard and Crusher arrive at the Kes border and, while Picard gets across, Crusher is caught by Prytt security forces. Her captors hail Lorin, who orders Crusher and Picard returned to the Enterprise. Safe at home, Picard and Crusher have the implants removed and share a dinner without reading each other's minds. Picard suggests that they should not be afraid to explore their feelings for one another. Crusher kisses Picard's cheek but then tells him perhaps they should be more afraid and hints that they should go slowly. Picard kisses Crusher's lips, the two bid each other goodnight, and Crusher leaves Picard's quarters. Picard blows out the candles in his stateroom and stares into space.

== Arc narrative ==
In the finale ("All Good Things...") it is revealed that in an alternate future, Picard and Crusher get married, and Crusher becomes captain of a medical starship.

In the sequel series Star Trek: Picard, Beverly reveals that around 2380, she and Picard had a child, Jack Crusher II, but Beverly hid Jack from Picard out of concern for Jack's safety. Beverly captains a different medical starship and helps Jack in his extralegal exploits.

== Reception ==
In 2017, CBR ranked Picard and Beverly the number one best romantic relationship of all Star Trek.

In 2018, Tom's Guide rated "Attached" one of the 15 best episodes featuring Picard.

== Releases ==
"Attached" has been released as part of TNG Season 7 collections on DVD and Blu-Ray formats. Season 7 of TNG, which contains "Attached" was released on Blu-ray disc in January 2015.
