= East River Soccer Complex =

Coordinates: 37°17′07″N 81°07′46″W

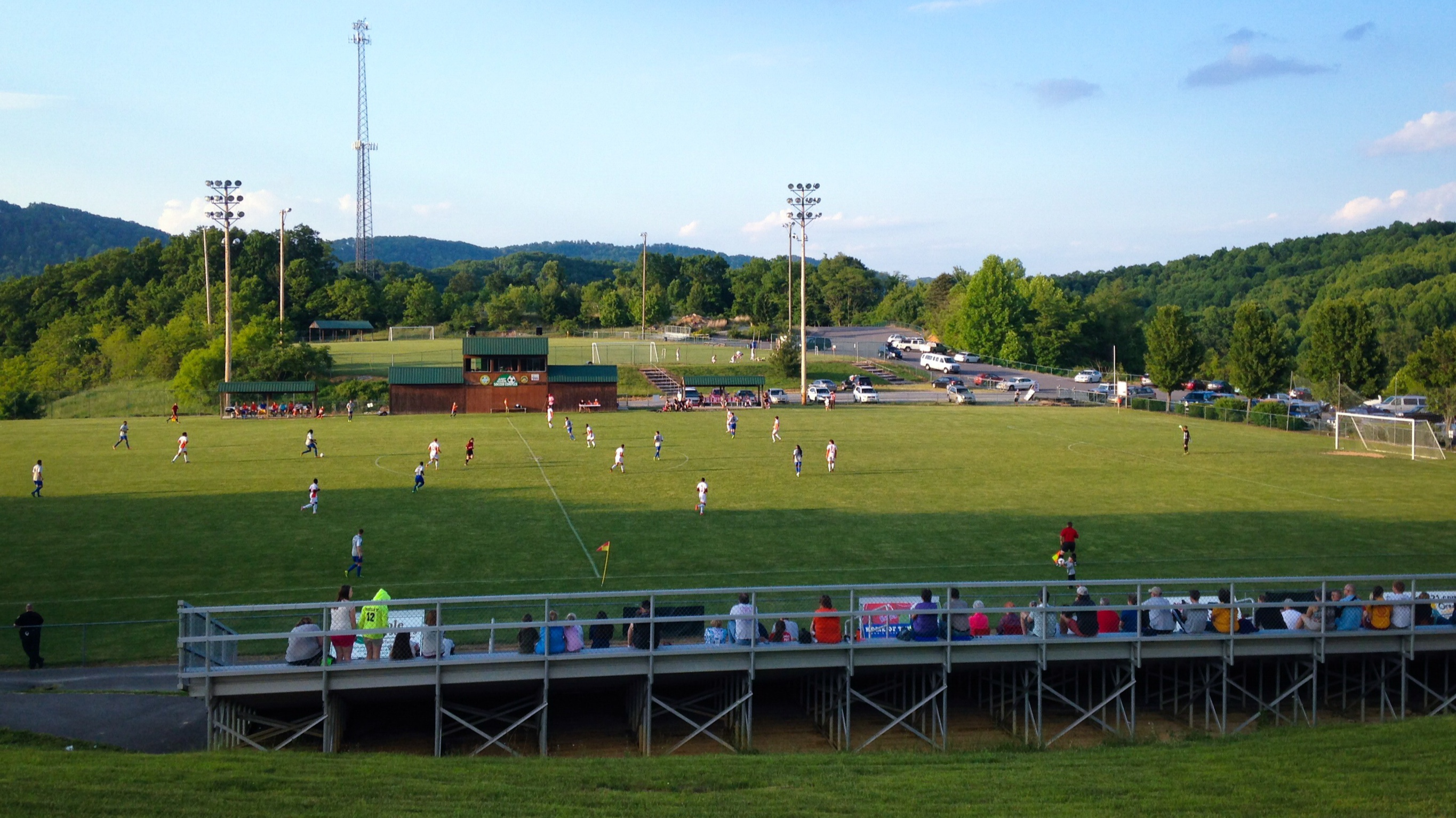
- A match at Field 1 in 2014
- Interactive map of East River Soccer Complex
- Address: Bluefield, WV; United States
- Owner: (none) (Note: It is a separate non profit organization. The actual land is owned by the Bluefield state college foundation but about 20 years ago they leased the property under a 99 year lease for $1 per year to ERSA. ERSA is a separate board whose purpose is to care and maintain the property as a soccer complex.)
- Operator: East River Soccer Association
- Capacity: 1,500 (Field 1); 250 (Field 2)
- Type: Soccer-specific stadium
- Surface: Natural grass
- Current use: Soccer

Tenants
- Bluefield Rams; SWV King's Warriors (2014–2017); Bluefield High School; Graham High School

The East River Soccer Complex is an expansive, five soccer field complex located in Bluefield, West Virginia. The ERSC is host to several teams of the Bluefield micropolitan area. Youth, middle school, high school, and adult recreational soccer is held at the complex and is regulated by The East River Soccer Association. Field 1 is home to the Southern West Virginia King's Warriors that are a member of the USL Premier Development League.

The complex also serves as home venue to the Bluefield Rams soccer program of Bluefield University.

2014 was the first season for the King's Warriors in Bluefield after a move from the Beckley YMCA, their home for two years. Five of East River's fields are full size which allows college and high school games to take place at the same time.

== Fields ==
Field 1 is full length and features bleachers, a concession stand, press box, locker rooms, and an officials hospitality area. Field 2 is full size and offers bleachers as well. Field 3 is mainly used for the youth recreational leagues that take place at the complex. Fields 4, 5, and 6 are full size and are used for games and training. The complex was the site of the USCAA National Soccer Championship hosted by Bluefield College in 2004.
