= Frank Doubleday (actor) =

American actor (1945–2018)

- Born: January 28, 1945; Norwich, Connecticut, U.S.
- Died: March 3, 2018 (aged 73); Los Angeles, California, U.S.
- Occupations: Actor; Theatre director
- Spouse(s): Christina Hart (m. 197?)
- Children: Kaitlin Doubleday; Portia Doubleday

Frank Burdette Doubleday (January 28, 1945 – March 3, 2018) was an American actor and theatre director, best known for his villainous roles in film and television.

== Early life ==
Doubleday was born in Norwich, Connecticut and moved to Los Angeles with his family as a child. He graduated from Los Angeles Pierce College.

== Career ==
Doubleday began his acting career in theatre before appearing in industrial films. He made his feature film debut in The First Nudie Musical (1976). That same year, he gained wide recognition for his role as the White Warlord in John Carpenter's Assault on Precinct 13 (1976). He worked with Carpenter again in Escape from New York (1981) as the supporting villain Romero. In the special edition Escape from New York DVD commentary, Kurt Russell credits Doubleday's performance as setting the tone of the movie.

Doubleday's other film credits include roles in Alex & the Gypsy (1976), The Big Fix (1978), Butch and Sundance: The Early Days (1979), Avenging Angel (1985), Nomads (1986), Broadcast News (1987), L.A. Bounty (1989), and Dollman (1991). He also acted and directed theater productions.

== Personal life ==
Doubleday was married to actress Christina Hart for over 40 years. For many years, the two taught acting at the Hollywood Court Theater. The couple had two daughters, actresses Kaitlin and Portia Doubleday.

=== Death ===
Doubleday died of complications from esophageal cancer at age 73 at his Los Angeles home on March 3, 2018.

== Filmography ==
Year	Title	Role	Notes
1976	The First Nudie Musical	Arvin	
1976	Alex & the Gypsy	Prisoner	
1976	Assault on Precinct 13	White Warlord	
1977	Abar, the First Black Superman	Tough	
1978	The Big Fix	Jonah's Partner	
1979	Butch and Sundance: The Early Days	Outlaw	
1981	Escape from New York	Romero	
1985	Avenging Angel	Miles Gerrard	
1985	Space Rage	Brain Surgeon	
1986	Nomads	Razor	
1987	Broadcast News	Mercenary	
1989	L.A. Bounty	Rand	
1991	Dollman	Cloy	
1991	Shakespeare's Plan 12 from Outer Space	Malvolio	
