= The Mad Bomber (film) =

- Directed by: Bert I. Gordon
- Screenplay by: Bert I. Gordon
- Story by: Marc Behm
- Starring: Vince Edwards; Chuck Connors; Neville Brand
- Cinematography: Bert I. Gordon
- Edited by: Gene Ruggiero
- Music by: Michel Mention
- Distributed by: Cinemation Industries
- Release date: 1972
- Running time: 91 min.
- Country: United States
- Language: English

The Mad Bomber, a.k.a. The Police Connection and Detective Geronimo, is a 1972 film produced, directed, and scripted by Bert I. Gordon. It stars Vince Edwards, Chuck Connors and Neville Brand.

== Plot ==
William Dorn, a middle-aged man in Los Angeles, rigs and sets off bombs in places he associates with the drug-overdose death of his daughter Ann and the collapse of his life. Investigating detective Geronimo Minnelli learns that at one of the locations of his attacks, a hospital, a rape took place, and both the victim Martha and her rapist George Fromley likely saw the face of the as-yet-unidentified bomber. The police desperately attempt to simultaneously identify and apprehend both violent criminals, hoping one will lead them to the other.

== Cast ==
- Vince Edwards as Geronimo Minelli
- Chuck Connors as William Dorn
- Neville Brand as George Fromley
- Hank Brandt as Blake
- Ted Gehring as Police Chief Marc C. Forester
- Christina Hart as Fromley's Victim
- Nancy Honnold as Anne Dorn

== Home media ==
The film was released on DVD as The Mad Bomber by Geneon on October 4, 2005, and as part of the same company's six-disc Cinema Deluxe Terror Pack on December 5, 2005. This release presented an edited-for-television cut of the movie. The full uncut version was released as The Police Connection by Code Red DVD on DVD in 2013, and upgraded to Blu-Ray limited to only 1,000 units in 2016; both releases are now out of print.
