= Wings Hauser =

American actor (1947–2025)

- Born: Gerald Dwight Hauser; December 12, 1947; Los Angeles, California, U.S.
- Died: March 15, 2025 (aged 77); Santa Monica, California, U.S.
- Other name: J.D. Hauser
- Occupations: Actor, film director, screenwriter, musician
- Years active: 1966–2019
- Spouses: Margaret Boltinhouse (m. 1970; div. 1973) Cass Warner (m. 1974; div. 1977) Nancy Locke (m. 1979; div. 1999) Cali Lili Hauser (m. 2002)
- Children: 2, including Cole
- Parent(s): Dwight Hauser; Geraldine Thienes
- Relatives: Milton Sperling (father-in-law)

Gerald Dwight "Wings" Hauser (December 12, 1947 – March 15, 2025) was an American actor, screenwriter, film director and musician. A prolific character actor, he appeared in over 100 film and television productions since 1967, and was once called "the biggest star you've never heard of". He received an Independent Spirit Award nomination for Best Supporting Male for his role in Tough Guys Don't Dance (1987). He is the father of actor Cole Hauser.

== Early life ==
Hauser was born in the Hollywood neighborhood of Los Angeles, the son of Geraldine (née Thienes) and Dwight Hauser, a director and producer. His brother is actor Erich Hauser. The elder Hauser's career was hampered by the Red Scare, and the family moved outside Los Angeles when Hauser was 8 years old, where his father started a small theatre group. He earned his nickname during high school, when he played football as a wing-back.

Hauser made his film debut at the age of 18, when he played a small role in the 1967 war film First to Fight. Although from an acting family, Hauser did not seriously pursue acting at first, and spent most of his twenties working as a folk musician and busker. For a period in the early 1970s, Hauser was homeless, and spent several months living in a vacant garage with his infant daughter Bright.

In 1970, he was a member of the band "Vision of Sunshine" that released a self-titled album on the Avco-Embassy label. In 1975, Hauser released an album for RCA titled Your Love Keeps Me Off the Streets. For this LP, he used the name "Wings Livinryte". Though the album was not a success, it enabled Hauser to move into more stable housing with his daughter. The same year, he appeared in an episode of the television series Cannon, earning his SAG card.

== Career ==
Hauser first attracted notice in December 1977, when as an unknown he was cast to play Greg Foster on the soap opera The Young and the Restless, succeeding Brian Kerwin in the part. Hauser remained with the show until 1981, when he was succeeded by Howard McGillin. He returned to the part nearly thirty years later for three episodes, in 2010.

Hauser had his film breakthrough playing the villainous pimp Ramrod in Vice Squad (1982). Hauser also wrote and performed the film's theme song, "Neon Slime".

In 1983, he wrote the story for the Paramount Pictures box-office hit Uncommon Valor. The film was stories of a childhood friend, Gary Dickerson, who had been to Vietnam. According to Hauser:

I saw that [Dickerson] had left something behind in Viet Nam and that triggered the whole thing. And then I became aware of the MIA and the POW situation and said well that will be the excuse to go back to Nam and get the POWs, but what they’re really going back for is their own clarity and their own integrity right? And that’s the story. That’s the whole film.

In 1982, Hauser starred as Garrard in Hear No Evil, a television film. In 1987, he was co-starred in the Norman Mailer-directed Tough Guys Don't Dance, earning an Independent Spirit Award nomination for Best Supporting Male.

Hauser appeared in 41 television series, including recurring roles in Beverly Hills, 90210, Murder, She Wrote, and Roseanne, and a cameo as a juror in the season 4 episode "Mr. Monk Gets Jury Duty" of Monk.

In 2010, Hauser appeared in Rubber, a French film directed by Quentin Dupieux.

== Personal life and death ==
Hauser had a daughter from his first marriage to Jane Boltinhouse. From his second marriage to Cass Warner Sperling, daughter of Milton Sperling, he had a son, actor Cole Hauser. According to the younger Hauser, he and his father did not have a relationship when he was a child, but later reconciled and reconnected when he was a teenager.

Hauser later remarried to actress Cali Lili Hauser, with whom he built a marine life and butterfly animal sanctuary.

In the early 1990s, Hauser was in a relationship with actress Linda Blair.

Chronic obstructive pulmonary disease resulted in declining health for Hauser, who relied on breathing assistance from oxygen tanks in his final years. He died in Santa Monica on March 15, 2025, at the age of 77.

== Filmography ==
=== Film ===
- 1967: First to Fight as Ragan (uncredited)
- 1978: Who'll Stop the Rain as Marine Driver
- 1982: Vice Squad as "Ramrod"
- 1982: Homework as "Reddog"
- 1982: Hear No Evil as Garrard
- 1983: Ghost Dancing as Frank Carswell
- 1983: Deadly Force as "Stoney" Cooper
- 1984: Mutant as Josh Cameron
- 1984: A Soldier's Story as Lieutenant Byrd
- 1984: Sweet Revenge as Major Frank Hollins
- 1984: Terror in the Aisles as "Ramrod" in Vice Squad (archive footage) (uncredited)
- 1985: Command 5 as Jack Coburn
- 1985: The Long Hot Summer as Wilson Mahood
- 1986: 3:15 as Mr. Havilland (uncredited)
- 1986: Jo Jo Dancer, Your Life Is Calling as Cliff
- 1986: The Wind as Phil
- 1986: Hostage as Major Sam Striker
- 1987: Tough Guys Don't Dance as Captain Alvin Luther Regency
- 1987: No Safe Haven as Clete Harris
- 1988: Dead Man Walking as John Luger
- 1988: Dark Horse as Captain Brandt
- 1988: Death Street USA (a.k.a. Nightmare at Noon) as Ken Griffiths
- 1988: The Carpenter as Carpenter
- 1989: The Siege of Firebase Gloria as Corporal Joseph L. DiNardo
- 1989: L.A. Bounty as Cavanaugh
- 1989: Bedroom Eyes II as Harry Ross
- 1990: Reason to Die as Elliot Canner
- 1990: Marked for Murder as Emerson
- 1990: Coldfire as Lars
- 1990: Street Asylum as Arliss Ryder
- 1990: Out of Sight, Out of Mind as Victor Lundgren
- 1990: Wilding as Tim Parsons
- 1990: Pale Blood as Van Vandameer
- 1990: Living to Die as Nick Carpenter
- 1991: Bump in the Night as Patrick Tierney
- 1991: Frame Up as Ralph Baker
- 1991: The Killers Edge (a.k.a. Blood Money) as Jack
- 1991: Beastmaster 2: Through the Portal of Time as Arklon
- 1991: The Art of Dying as Jack
- 1991: In Between as Jack Maxwell
- 1992: Frame Up II: The Cover-Up (a.k.a. Deadly Conspiracy) as Sheriff Ralph Baker
- 1992: Mind, Body & Soul as John Stockton
- 1992: Exiled in America as Fred Jenkins
- 1993: Champagne and Bullets as Huck Finney
- 1994: Watchers 3 as Ferguson
- 1994: Skins (a.k.a. Gang Boys) as Joe Joiner
- 1995: Victim of Desire as Leland Duvall
- 1995: Tales from the Hood as Officer Strom
- 1995: Broken Bars as Warden Pitt
- 1995: Guns & Lipstick as Michael
- 1996: Original Gangstas as Michael Casey
- 1999: Life Among the Cannibals as Vince
- 1999: The Insider as Tobacco Lawyer
- 2000: Clean and Narrow as Sheriff Brand
- 2001: Savage Season as Maddox
- 2002: The Blue Lizard as "Little G"
- 2004: Irish Eyes (a.k.a. Vendetta: No Conscience, No Mercy) as Kevin Kilpatrick
- 2004: The Ruining as Not Hasselhoff
- 2006: Mystery Woman: Wild West Mystery as Strother Elam
- 2007: Avenging Angel as Colonel Cusack
- 2007: The Stone Angel as Older Bram
- 2010: Rubber as Man in Wheelchair
- 2019: Eve N' God: This Female Is Not Yet Rated (TM) as God

=== Television ===
- 1975: Cannon “A Touch of Venom” as Ethan Morse (Credited as Wings Livinryte)
- 1976: Baretta as Dave
- 1977: Emergency! as Larry, and injured gymnast
- 1981–2010: The Young and The Restless as Greg Foster
- 1981: Magnum, P.I. - "Wave Goodbye" as Nick Frangakis
- 1983: The Fall Guy - "Just a Small Circle of Friends" as Baba
- 1984: Hunter - "Dead or Alive" as Jimmy Jo Walker
- 1985: Hardcastle and McCormick - "You Don't Hear The One That Gets You" as Arvin Lee
- 1985: Airwolf - "Airwolf II" as Harlan Jenkins
- 1985: The A-Team - "The Big Squeeze", "Blood, Sweat, and Cheers" as Jack 'The Ripper' Lane / Karl Ludwig
- 1985–1996: Murder, She Wrote - "Reflections of the Mind", "Night Fear", "Love & Hate in Cabot Cove", "Track of a Soldier" as Howard Levering / Sam Bennett / Wallace Evans / Carl
- 1986: The Last Precinct as Lieutenant Hobbs
- 1987: Perry Mason - "The Case of the Scandalous Scoundrel" as Captain James Rivers
- 1988–1991: China Beach as Lt. Col. Mac Miller
- 1990: Freddy's Nightmares - "Easy Come, East Go" as Sonny
- 1992: Lightning Force as LT. Col Matthew "Trane" Coltrane
- 1992–1993: Roseanne as Ty Tilden, Neighbor
- 1993: Space Rangers - "Fort Hope" as Ex-Ranger Decker
- 1994: Walker, Texas Ranger - "Right Man, Wrong Time" as Wayland Hampton
- 1994–1996: Beverly Hills 90210 as J. Jay Jones
- 1995: Kung Fu: The Legend Continues - "Brotherhood of the Bell" as Damon
- 1996: JAG - "Sightings" as J.D. Gold
- 2003: Kingpin as Doug Duffy
- 2005: House - "Hunting" as Michael Ryan
- 2007: Bones - "The Man in the Mud" (2007) as Lenny Fitz
- 2009: The Mentalist - "Paint It Red" as A.P. Caid
- 2010: Criminal Minds - "Exit Wounds" as Sheriff Rhodes
