= Can Ellen Be Saved? =

1974 American TV film directed by Harvey Hart

- Genre: Drama
- Written by: Emmett Roberts
- Directed by: Harvey Hart
- Starring: Leslie Nielsen; Katherine Cannon; Michael Parks; John Saxon; Louise Fletcher
- Country of origin: United States
- Original language: English

Production
- Producer: Everett Chambers
- Cinematography: Earl Rath
- Editors: Ronald J. Fagan; George Jay Nicholson
- Running time: 73 minutes
- Production companies: ABC Circle Films

Original release
- Network: ABC
- Release: February 5, 1974

Can Ellen Be Saved? is a 1974 American made-for-television drama film directed by Harvey Hart and starring Leslie Nielsen, Katherine Cannon, Michael Parks and John Saxon. The film premiered as the ABC Movie of the Week on February 5, 1974.

== Plot ==
A young girl in search of spiritual enlightenment joins a religious cult, and becomes the focus of a struggle between her family and the group.

== Cast ==
- Leslie Nielsen as Arnold Lindsey
- Katherine Cannon as Ellen Lindsey
- Michael Parks as Joseph
- John Saxon as James Hallbeck
- Louise Fletcher as Bea Lindsey
- Rutanya Alda as Rachael
- Christina Hart as Mary
- William Katt as Bob
- Kathleen Quinlan as Melissa
- Scott Colomby as Randy

== See also ==
- List of American films of 1974
