= Rita Stapleton =

- Guiding Light character
- Portrayed by: Lenore Kasdorf
- Duration: 1975–1981
- First appearance: October 8, 1975
- Last appearance: June 30, 1981
- Created by: Jerome and Bridget Dobson
In-universe information
- Occupation: Registered nurse
- Mother: Viola Stapleton
- Sisters: Eve Stapleton
- Spouse: Ed Bauer (1978–1981)

Rita Stapleton Bauer is a fictional character from the CBS (Columbia Broadcasting System) soap opera Guiding Light. The character was played by Lenore Kasdorf and created by Bridget and Jerome Dobson, shortly after they became Guiding Light's head writers in 1975. Rita was written out in 1981, as Kasdorf announced she was leaving the show, but she had been so popular in the role, that producers decided against recasting.

== Character's background ==
Rita was born and raised in Bluefield, West Virginia, and is the eldest of two sisters. She grew up under modest circumstances. Her father was a coal miner, and her mother was a schoolteacher. When she first arrived in Springfield to take a job as a nurse at Cedars Hospital, Rita began dating Dr. Tim Ryan (Jordan Clarke). However, she soon became interested in the Chief of Surgery, Ed Bauer (Mart Hulswit), and the two began dating. The two became closer, particularly after Ed helped Rita's elderly mother Viola (Kate Wilkinson) recover from a stroke, and he soon asked Rita to marry him. However, unbeknownst to him, Rita shared a past with his nemesis Roger Thorpe (Michael Zaslow) (who Ed had just found out was the biological father of the child, who was thought to be his, Christina).

Unfortunately, her past with Roger would come out while she was on trial for the murder of a wealthy, elderly Texas oil man, Cyrus Granger, for whom she had worked as a private duty nurse prior to coming to Springfield (she also became a suspect in the death of Granger's son Malcolm, who had followed Rita to Springfield, and then died under mysterious circumstances, after being admitted to Cedars). Roger had also worked for Cyrus Granger. (These events had occurred off-screen before Rita arrived in Springfield and during a three-month period during which Roger was said to have left town in early 1975.) He and Rita had a brief fling, and then both went their separate ways after Granger's death; both coincidentally ended up in Springfield independently of one another.

Though she was hesitant to provide an alibi, it eventually came out that Rita couldn't have committed the crime, for she was involved in a sexual tryst with Roger at the time. While Rita was acquitted, Ed, upset and angry to learn of her past with Roger, broke things off with her. Rita briefly dated Dr. Peter Chapman, though he turned out to be more interested in Ed's ex-wife Holly Norris Bauer (Maureen Garrett).

Eventually, Ed got over his anger. He and Rita reconnected. He grew closer to Rita during a period where she had to contend with an apparent stalker, who pushed Rita down a flight of stairs, tampered with her brakes, and attempted to set her apartment on fire (trapping Rita's then-blind sister Eve (Janet Grey) in the burning apartment). Ultimately, the stalker was revealed to be Georgene Granger (Delphi Harrington), Cyrus Granger's deranged daughter-in-law, who held Rita and Eve at gunpoint in their apartment building laundry room. Granger then confessed that it was in fact she who had murdered Cyrus (She was trying to prevent her father-in-law from changing his will to include Rita, unaware that he had in fact already done so)and that she was also indirectly responsible for the death of her husband Malcolm (she snuck into his room at Cedars and began berating him over her incorrect presumption that he and Rita had had an affair, causing him to have a fatal heart attack). By this time, Ed, along with Eve's fiancé Ben McFerren (actor Stephen Yates) and Springfield Police Chief Larry Wyatt had pieced together that Georgene was the stalker, and were tipped off that she was holding Rita and Eve at gunpoint.

Ed and Ben showed up at the laundry room just in time to rescue Rita and Eve, overhearing Georgene's confession. With Georgene arrested, Ed and Rita became engaged. However, before they were married, Roger appeared at Rita's apartment, angry over how providing an alibi for her during her murder trial had cost him his own marriage. Becoming increasingly enraged, he raped Rita. Afraid that no one would believe her, Rita remained silent. She and Ed married in November 1978. A few months later, Roger also raped Holly and Rita became overcome with guilt at having not come forward earlier. Holly did press charges, and when it looked like Roger would be acquitted, Rita finally revealed that Roger had raped her too. However, at the same time this was happening, Holly pointed a gun at Roger and, in a moment of post-traumatic stress, shot him. She was convicted of the murder (despite the extenuating circumstances) and Ed came to resent Rita for not telling him about the rape, causing a strain in their marriage.

Alienated from Ed and under pressure to be an active stepmother to Christina (which necessitated her leaving nursing), Rita began a reckless fling with an old boyfriend, Dr. Greg Fairbanks, who had just relocated to Springfield (and who also began seeing Rita's younger sister Eve, though neither sister knew Fairbanks was dating the other). When Rita found herself pregnant, she was unable to determine whether Ed or Greg was the father. Though she briefly considered terminating the pregnancy, after a discussion with her mother Viola, she decided to keep the baby. Toward the end of her pregnancy, Rita decided to undergo paternity testing on her fetus in order to try to determine whether Ed or Greg was the father (which, in 1980, before DNA testing, consisted of comparing the baby's blood types with the potential fathers'). Before she could get the results, however, Rita spotted a clown at a charity carnival to benefit Cedars as Roger Thorpe (who was presumed to be dead, after having been shot by Holly).

After thwarting Roger's attempt to abduct Christina, Roger chased after Rita, cornering her in a hall of mirrors (all the while Donna Summer and Barbra Streisand's disco hit "No More Tears (Enough is Enough)" playing, in a sequence that would win Guiding Light its first "Best Daytime Drama" Emmy). Roger abducted Rita and brought her to a remote cabin. Eventually, Ed and his brother, attorney Mike Bauer, tracked Roger and Rita down. Roger fled, but Rita went into premature labour and accidentally kicked over a kerosene lamp. Ed and Mike were able to save Rita, but she lost her baby (who it had since been revealed was Ed's). For months, Rita recuperated at home with her mother in West Virginia.

In the early summer of 1980, Rita returned to Springfield and reconciled with Ed. The couple tried to patch their marriage up, but the resentment and hurt were too difficult for them to overcome. Ed remained emotionally distant, and Rita began to have a torrid affair with Alan Spaulding (Christopher Bernau), who was at the time married to her niece Hope Bauer. When the affair was revealed in the spring of 1981 by blackmailer Andy Norris, Rita left Springfield for good. The last glimpse of her was as she sat in an airplane, taking off for parts unknown, wondering if she would ever come back to Springfield. It was suggested at the time of her departure that she might be pregnant, but this was never confirmed (nor was it confirmed whether the baby would have been Alan's or Ed's).

After her departure, Ed and Alan both tried to locate Rita, independently of one another, though her whereabouts were unknown. (She was said to be headed to San Francisco, but Alan's private investigator was unable to find her there). Eve informed Ed that she believed Rita had left San Francisco a few months after arriving there because she feared she was being followed and that she'd then lost contact with her sister. Neither Eve nor Rita's mother, Viola, had any further knowledge of Rita's whereabouts. Eventually, Ed was granted a divorce from Rita on the grounds of abandonment. The character was last referred to by name on Guiding Light in the late 1980s, during a conversation between Ed and Alan; she was subsequently referenced (referred to as "Ed's third wife") on two additional occasions during the 1990s.

== Bibliography ==
- Christopher Schemering (1986). Guiding Light: A 50th Anniversary Celebration. Ballantine Books. p. 146. ISBN 0345339312.
