= William Paterson (actor) =

American actor (1919–2003)

- Born: July 7, 1919; Buffalo, New York, U.S.
- Died: September 3, 2003 (aged 84); San Francisco, California, U.S.
- Occupation: Actor
- Years active: 1947–1998
- Spouses: Patricia Best (1943–45?); Cora Beams (1951–1993)

William Paterson (July 7, 1919 – September 3, 2003) was an actor in American regional theater who also appeared on television and in films.

== Biography ==
=== Early life ===
William Paterson was born on July 7, 1919, in Buffalo, New York, to a Scottish-American father and an Irish-American mother. Raised a Catholic, Paterson's elementary education was at St. Mark's Parochial School. Eschewing a Catholic high school, Paterson had a short, unhappy stint at Bennett High School, before attending and graduating from the private Nichols School, where he was introduced to acting in his senior year. In 1941, he graduated from Brown University, with honors in English literature. He then served four years in the US army, earning a Bronze Star and Purple Heart in Europe as a staff officer with the 110th Infantry Regiment during World War II.

=== Career ===
In 1947, after his army service, Paterson joined The Cleveland Play House, a repertory company, where he stayed for twenty years. He spent summers performing with this company at the Chautauqua Institution. Occasionally, he would appear on live television, in films, and touring nationally with his own one-man biographical shows.

In 1967, Paterson joined San Francisco's American Conservatory Theater (ACT), where he stayed for the next thirty years, until his retirement in 1998, becoming well known for his portrayal of Ebenezer Scrooge in Charles Dickens's A Christmas Carol.

=== Personal life ===
In 1943, Paterson married Patricia Best, a marriage that lasted until shortly after the war. In 1951, Paterson married Cora Beams, a marriage that ended with her death in 1993. He served nine years on the San Francisco Arts Commission and two years as a trustee of ACT. He twice worked as Senator Dianne Feinstein's campaign treasurer when she was at City Hall. His autobiography, Solid seasons: My 45 years at two resident theatres and what generations of critics made of them, was published in 1997.

== Selected stage work ==
=== Cleveland ===
- The Caine Mutiny Court-Martial (1954–55) – Lt. Barney Greenwald
- Much Ado About Nothing (1955–56) – Benedick
- Tiger at the Gates (1956–57) – Hector

=== San Francisco ===
- Long Day's Journey Into Night (1967–68) – James Tyrone Sr.
- A Christmas Carol (1976–77) – Ebenezer Scrooge
- Saint Joan (1988–89) – Bishop of Beauvais

== Selected film and TV appearances ==
- The F.B.I. – "The Savage Wilderness" (1970; Season 6, Episode 5) – Dr. Sharpe
- Dirty Harry (1971) – Judge Bannerman
- Bonanza – "Riot" (1972; Season 14, Episode 4) – Mr. Vannerman
- The Waltons – "The Separation" (1973; Season 2, Episode 3) – Oglethorpe 'Fred' Hansen
- At Long Last Love (1975) – Murray (Poker Party)
- The Taming of the Shrew (1976 TV broadcast) – Baptista
- Hear No Evil (1982 made-for-TV-Movie) – Minister
- Hard Traveling (1986) – Sheriff
- Pacific Heights (1990) – Mr. Hill (final film role)

== Works cited ==
- Jones, Kenneth (September 5, 2003). "William Paterson, Veteran Regional Theatre Actor of Cleveland Playhouse and ACT, Dead at 84". Obituaries. Playbill.
- Hurwitt, Robert (September 5, 2003). "William Paterson -- acted in plays for most of life". San Francisco Chronicle.
- Paterson, William (1996). Solid seasons: My 45 years at two resident theatres and what generations of critics made of them. OCLC 39348461.
