= Hear No Evil (1982 film) =

1982 film by Harry Falk Jr.

- Genre: Crime; Drama
- Written by: Tom Lazarus
- Directed by: Harry Falk Jr.
- Starring: Gil Gerard; Bernie Casey; Wings Hauser; Mimi Rogers; Christina Hart; Brion James; Ron Karabatsos; Mickey Jones; Raven De La Croix; Robert Dryer
- Composer: Lance Rubin
- Country of origin: United States
- Original language: English

Production
- Producer: Paul Pompian
- Cinematography: Michael P. Joyce
- Editor: Ann E. Mills
- Running time: 120 minutes (with commercials)
- Production companies: Paul Pompian Productions; MGM Television

Original release
- Network: CBS
- Release: November 20, 1982

Hear No Evil is a 1982 made-for-television-film directed by Harry Falk Jr. and written by Tom Lazarus. The TV film stars Gil Gerard, Bernie Casey, Wings Hauser, Mimi Rogers, Christina Hart, Brion James, Ron Karabatsos, Mickey Jones, Raven De La Croix, and Robert Dryer.

== Plot ==
After a cop becomes deaf in a fight, he tries to break up a drug ring run by bikers.

== Cast ==
- Gil Gerard as Dragon
- Bernie Casey as Monday
- Wings Hauser as Garrard
- Mimi Rogers as Meg
- Christina Hart as Sheila Green
- Brion James as Billy Boy Burns
- Ron Karabatsos as Lt. Lew Healy
- Mickey Jones as Blackman
- Raven De La Croix as Candy Burns
- Robert Dryer as Vinnie Holzer
- William Paterson as Minister
- John G. Scanlon as Summers
- Parker Whitman as Riles
- Jana Winters as Hooker
- Joe Bellan as Cabbie
- Denise Kerwin as Judy
- Charles Bouvier as Wilkes
- Steve Burton as Plainclothesman

== Production ==
Hear No Evil is based on the true story of William O. "Bill" Zerby, a former Marine who, as a Solano County Sherriff's Office narcotics detective, aggressively pursued members of the Hells Angels suspected of producing and distributing methamphetamine in the San Francisco Bay Area. Zerby was injured, suffered severe hearing loss and was forced to retire from his law enforcement agency as a result of an explosive device detonated as he was entering his car in front of his home on January 30, 1978. He was en route to court for a prehearing in the methamphetamine possession trial of Oakland Hells Angels chapter vice-president James Ezekiel "Jim-Jim" Brandes at the time. Brandes, who had previously been found to be in possession of a military handbook on booby traps and an address book containing the address, phone number and the license-plate number of Zerby when he was arrested on drug charges by Zerby and another detective on November 14, 1977, stated to a reporter for Rolling Stone magazine in or around November 1978 that "Zerby drew a line and stepped over it. I don't take that from anybody in the streets, and I sure ain't gonna take that from him. I don't let nobody come around and shove me around. I don't think anyone does if he's a man." The following year, Brandes and Kenneth Jay "K.O." Owen, a member of the Vallejo Hells Angels who had previously been arrested after a raid on his home led by Zerby uncovered narcotics and prohibited firearms on June 21, 1977, were charged with the attempted murder of Zerby as part of a racketeering case. Brandes and Owen were ultimately acquitted of the attempt on Zerby's life. Brandes later committed suicide by hanging himself in prison circa 1994. Owen died July 4, 2016, and Zerby died in 2021 at the age of seventy-nine.

Producer Paul Pompian heard of the Zerby incident while filming a TV pilot in San Francisco and decided to pursue the idea of translating the events into a teleplay. Paul Pompian Productions and MGM Television produced the television film which could have become a television series.

== Reception ==
=== Critical response ===
Film critic John J. O'Connor of The New York Times wrote in his review: "TRAINING for a new gimmick in the old police-drama formula, Hear No Evil, tomorrow's television movie on CBS, Channel 2, at 9, comes up with a deaf cop." Staff of the Pittsburgh Post-Gazette wrote: "Gil Gerard as Bill Dragon in a routine cop drama with a banal script and what only approximates acting. Even the central gimmick of permanently deafening the hero in an explosion seems to have been transferred by rubbings from ancient stones."
