= Bluefield, West Virginia =

- City
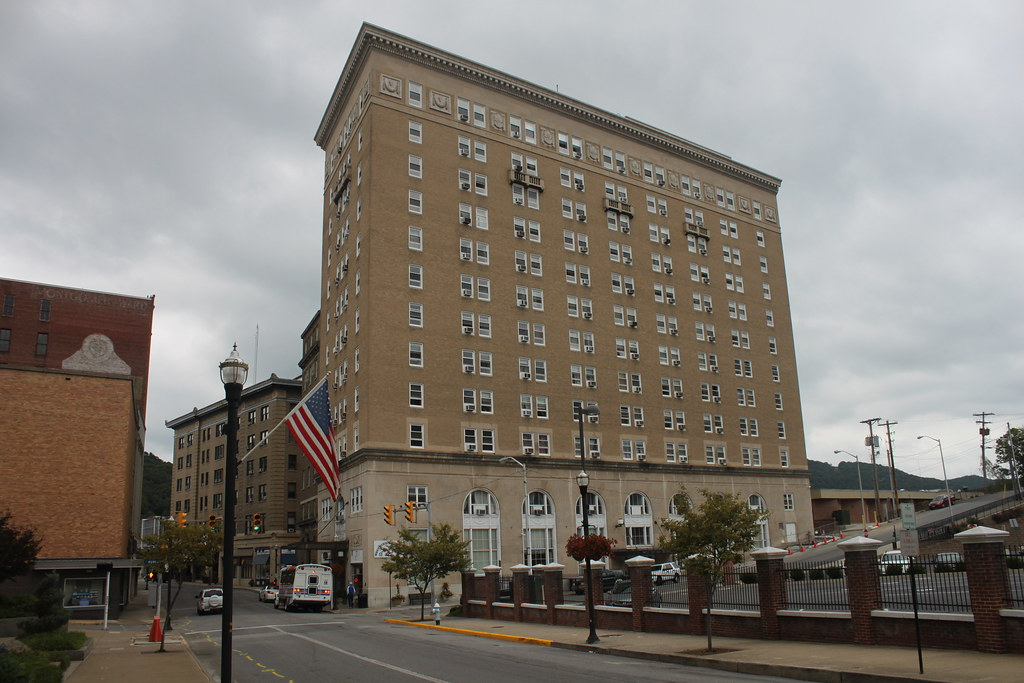
- Bluefield Downtown Commercial Historic District

- Seal Logo
- Nickname: Nature's Air Conditioned City
- Location of Bluefield in Mercer County, West Virginia

- Location in West Virginia Location in the United States
- Coordinates: 37°15′44″N 81°13′07″W
- Country: United States
- State: West Virginia
- County: Mercer
- Incorporated: 1889

Government
  - Mayor: Ronny Martin

Area
  - City: 9.03 sq mi (23.39 km^{2})
  - Land: 9.03 sq mi (23.39 km^{2})
  - Water: 0 sq mi (0.00 km^{2})
- Elevation: 2,631 ft (802 m)

Population (2020)
  - City: 9,658
  - Density: 1,069/sq mi (412.9/km^{2})
  - Metro: 106,363
- Time zone: UTC−5 (EST)
  - Summer (DST): UTC−4 (EDT)
- ZIP code: 24701
- Area codes: 304, 681
- FIPS code: 54-08524
- GNIS feature ID: 2390566
- Website: www.bluefieldwv.gov

Bluefield is a city in Mercer County, West Virginia, United States. Its population was 9,658 at the 2020 census. It is the principal city of the Bluefield micropolitan area extending into Virginia, which had a population of 106,363 in 2020. The city is home to Bluefield State University, a public, historically black university serving nearly 1,300 students.

== History ==
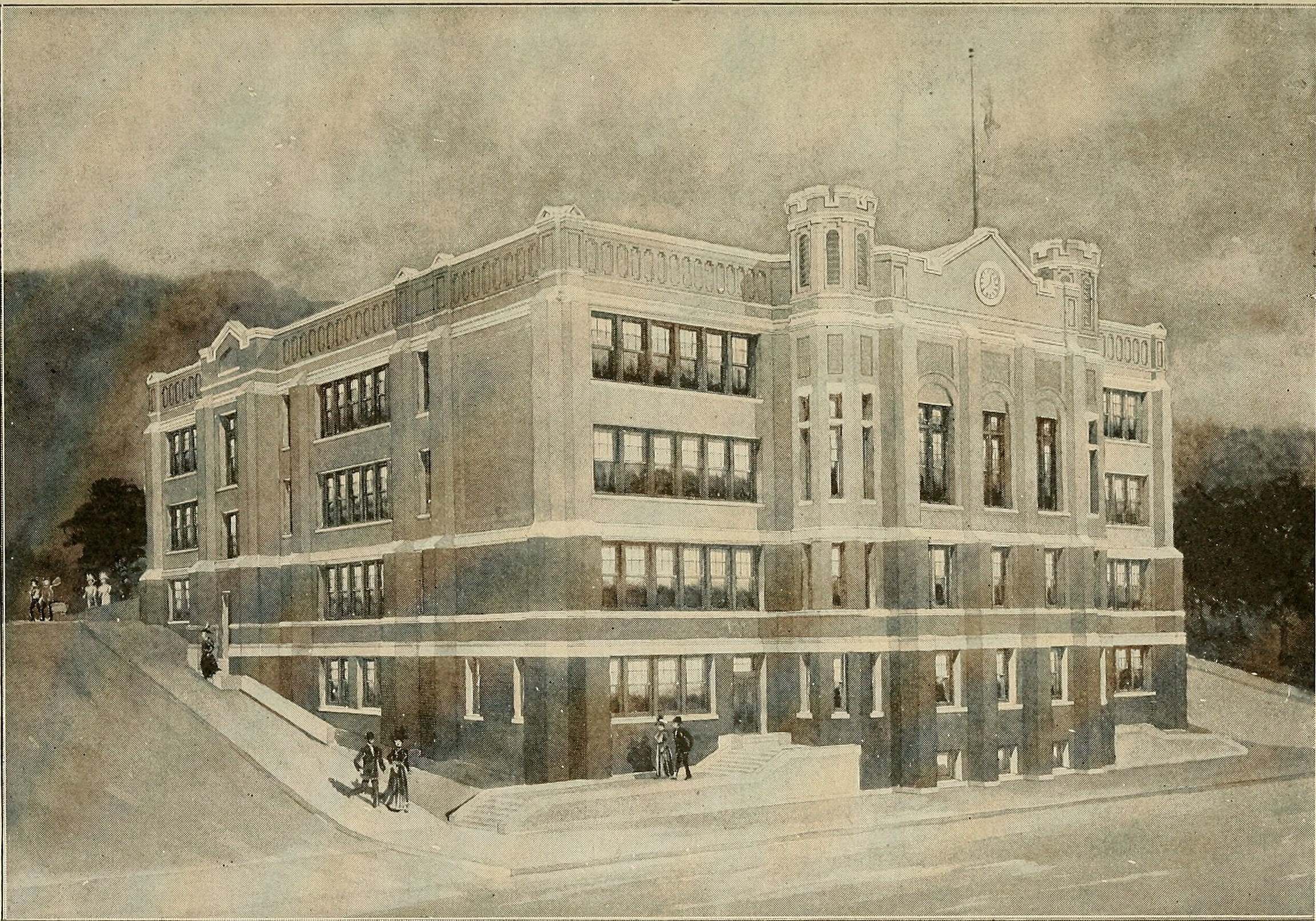
High school in Bluefield, 1910

The history of Bluefield began in the 18th century, when the Davidson and Bailey families settled in a rugged and remote part of what is now southern West Virginia. Others joined them, and they built a small village with a mill, a church, a one-room schoolhouse, and a fort for defending the settlement against invasions by the Shawnee tribe, which had a village on the banks of the Bluestone River.

In 1882, the descendants of the Davidson and Bailey families sold a portion of their land, when Captain John Fields of the Norfolk and Western Railway pioneered the area and began building a new railroad through the hills of Bluefield. The city is traditionally thought to be named after the chicory flowers in the area, which give the fields a purplish blue hue during the summer. Research has shown that this settlement, also known as Higginbotham's Summit in the 1880s, was probably named for the coal fields that were developed in the area of the Bluestone River.

=== Coal rush ===
Beneath the land of the Davidsons and Baileys lay the largest and richest deposit of bituminous coal in the world. The first seam was discovered in nearby Pocahontas, Virginia, in the backyard of Jordan Nelson. President Frederick Kimball of the Norfolk and Western Railway described this as the "most spectacular find on the continent and indeed perhaps of the entire planet." The coal seam had been mentioned much earlier in Thomas Jefferson's Notes on the State of Virginia, but it was not mined until 1882. Around that time, coal mines were developed in the area around Harman, Bluefield, War, and Pocahontas, which together were known as the Pocahontas Coal Fields. They helped support the Industrial Revolution in the United States. The development of the coal industry in this area created a boom in the local and national economy and attracted immigrant European workers and migrant African Americans from the Deep South to the mountains in search of industrial work.

In the late 19th century, the Norfolk and Western Railway Company selected Bluefield as the site for a repair center and a major division point, which greatly stimulated the town's growth. In the one-year period from 1887 to 1888, passenger travel along the railroad increased 317%. As with the extremely accelerated growth of San Francisco during the gold rush, Bluefield became a city that seemed to spring up "overnight." Growth far outpaced the existing infrastructure. Urban sprawl and blight were common complaints in the early days, as workers crowded into aging housing.

The coal boom generated a flood of money in the area. Nearby Bramwell, incorporated in 1888, boasted that it was the "Millionaires' Town" because more millionaires per capita lived there than anywhere in the nation. The city also had more automobiles per capita than any other city in the country. On November 20, 1889, the city of Bluefield was officially incorporated.

Bluefield headquartered the Baldwin-Felts Detective Agency, which initially worked train crimes, but became famous strike breakers and were prominent figures in the Coal Wars, including the Battle of Matewan.

With a strong Black community, Bluefield was the site of the 1895 founding of the Bluefield Colored Institute, an historically black college. It developed as today's Bluefield State University. Demographics began to shift with the hiring of its first White President, Dr. Hardway, and his closing of dormitories after the 1968 bombing. It is known as "The Whitest Historically Black College in America".

=== 20th century ===
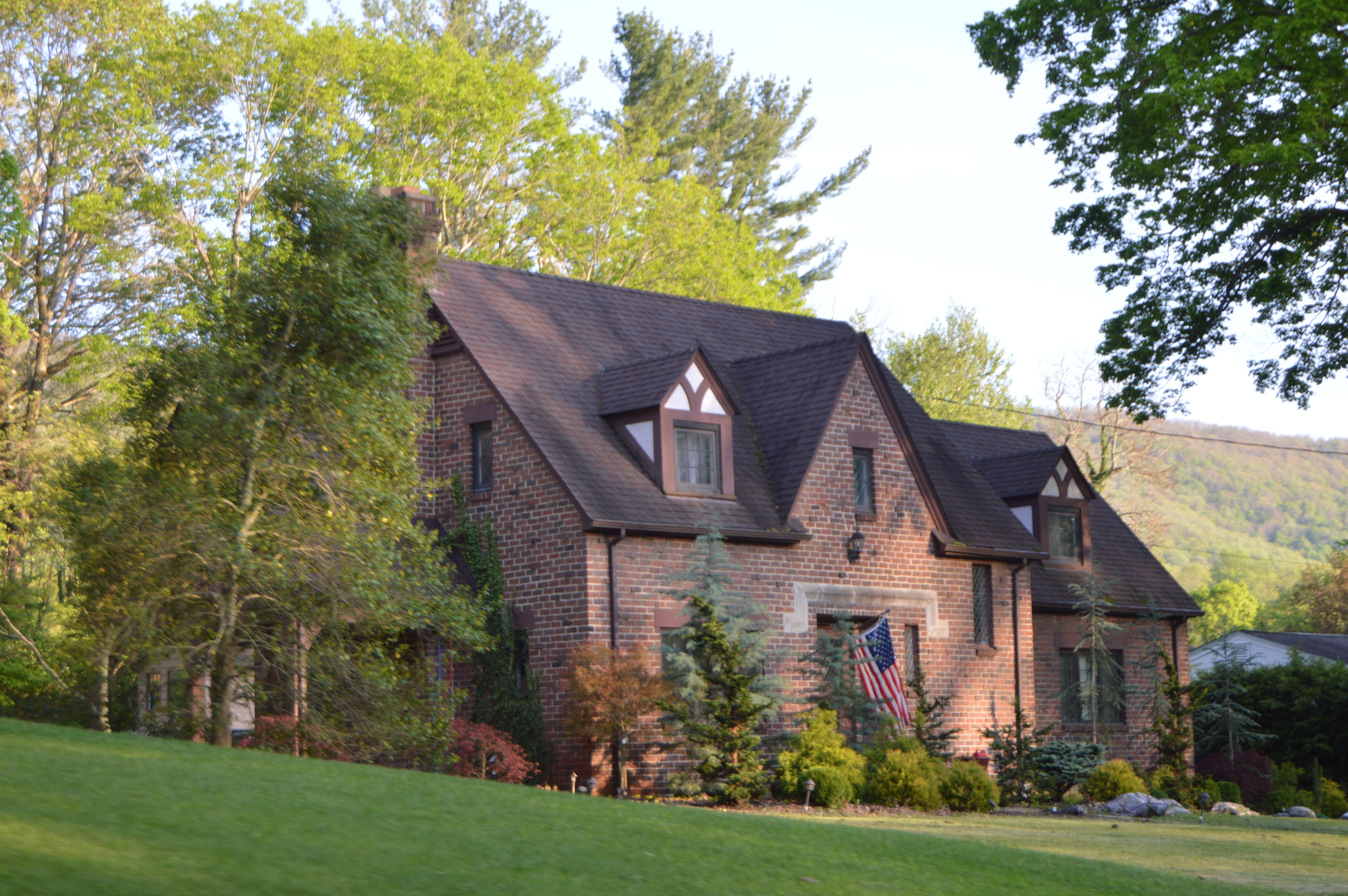
The Upper Oakhurst Historic District was primarily developed during the 1920s

During the 1920s, the 12-story West Virginian Hotel was built. It has been adapted and in the 21st century is operated as the West Virginia Manor and Retirement Home. In 1924, nearby Graham, Virginia, decided to rename itself as Bluefield to try to unite the two towns, which had been feuding since the Civil War. Nobel Prize-winning economist and mathematician John Forbes Nash was born in Bluefield in 1928. George Marshall Palmer, the well-renowned Purdue University professor of aeronautics and director of the Aerospace Sciences Laboratory at Purdue, led the invention of the Boeing wind tunnel and was a pioneer in the aerodynamic and structural testing of skyscrapers; he was born in Bluefield in 1921.

The Great Depression was particularly damaging to Bluefield. With the government nearly bankrupt, after a series of devastating structural fires swept through the downtown area, the city was nearly destroyed. Only at the outbreak of World War II did coal production revive. The strategic importance of the city was so great that Adolf Hitler put Bluefield on his reputed list of German air raid targets in the United States. Air raid practice drills were common in the city during this time.

In 1964, Helen Compton opened the now-demolished Shamrock Bar, the oldest gay bar in the state.

The Interstate Highway System was constructed through East River Mountain on December 20, 1974; for the first time automobile traffic could reach the city without crossing the top of the mountain. The dependence on the railroads waned and restructuring changed the industry. Bluefield lost jobs and population as a result. Its Amtrak station closed in the 1980s. Mercer Mall, the area's major shopping mall, opened in 1980.

== Geography ==
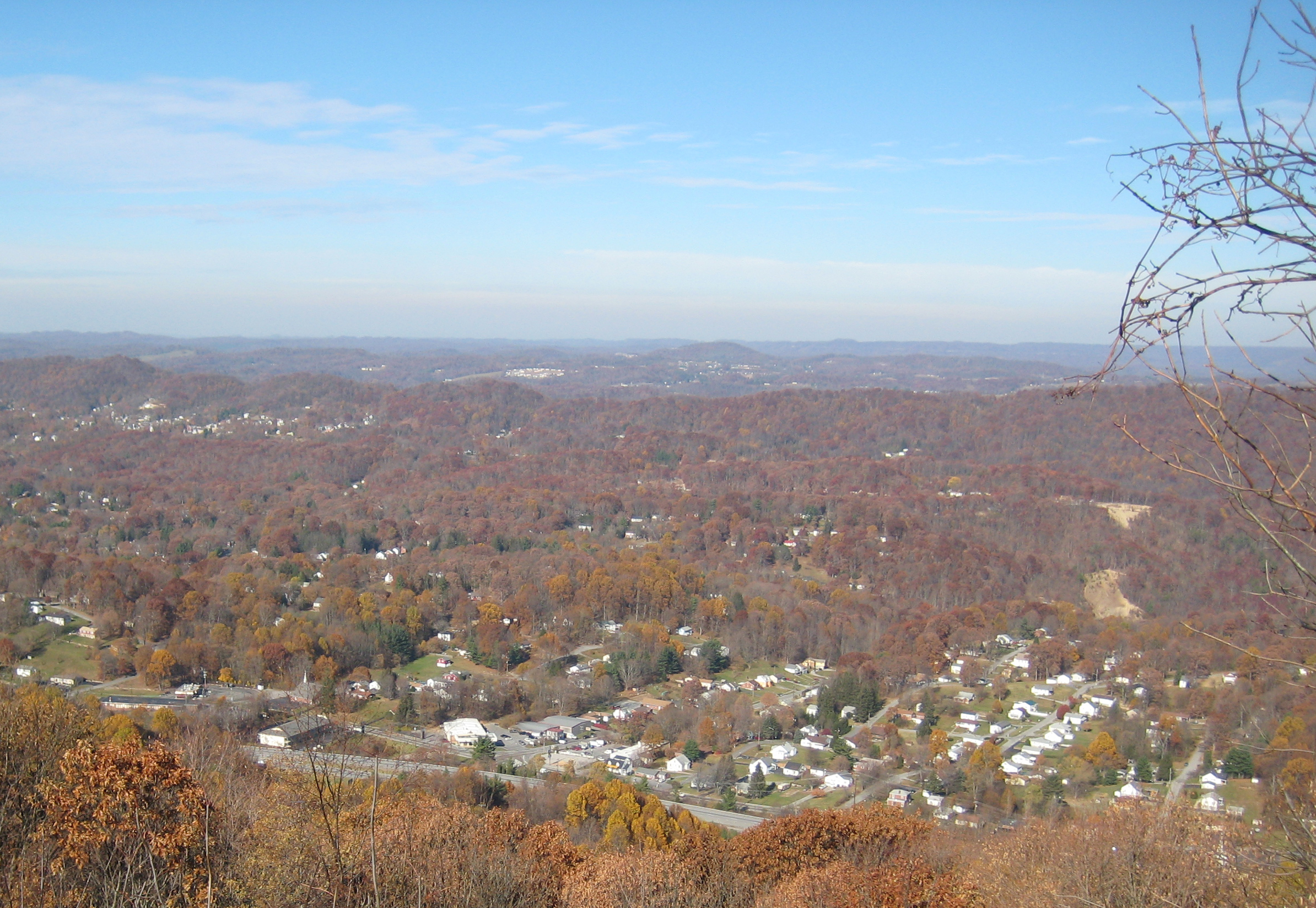
The mountainous terrain surrounding Bluefield

Bluefield is located in the Appalachian Mountains of West Virginia across the state border from Bluefield, Virginia.

According to the United States Census Bureau, the town has a total area of 8.86 square miles (22.95 km^{2}), all land.

=== Climate ===
Bluefield is a mountain city with a warm-summer humid continental climate (Dfb) bordering on subtropical highland climate or temperate oceanic climate (Cfb), due to its elevation. It is characterized by moderately cold, snowy winters and pleasantly warm to hot summers. The normal monthly mean daily temperature ranges from 31.9 °F (−0.1 °C) in January to 70.3 °F (21.3 °C) in July; on average, only 2.5 days occur with a maximum of at least 90 °F (32 °C) or greater, 1.3 days of minima at or below 0 °F (−18 °C), and 23 days where the maximum does not rise above freezing. The hottest temperature ever recorded in the city was 99 °F (37 °C), set on July 28, 1952, and August 9, 1957, with the coldest temperature at −25 °F (−32 °C), set on December 30, 1917.

Climate data for Bluefield, West Virginia (Mercer County Airport), 1991–2020 normals, (Note: Mean monthly maxima and minima (i.e. the expected highest and lowest temperature readings at any point during the year or given month) calculated based on data at said location from 1991 to 2020.) extremes 1909–present
Month	Jan	Feb	Mar	Apr	May	Jun	Jul	Aug	Sep	Oct	Nov	Dec	Year
Record high °F (°C)	75 (24)	75 (24)	87 (31)	90 (32)	92 (33)	97 (36)	99 (37)	99 (37)	96 (36)	88 (31)	83 (28)	78 (26)	99 (37)
Mean maximum °F (°C)	63 (17)	65 (18)	73 (23)	81 (27)	84 (29)	86 (30)	88 (31)	87 (31)	85 (29)	79 (26)	72 (22)	65 (18)	89 (32)
Mean daily maximum °F (°C)	39.9 (4.4)	43.4 (6.3)	51.4 (10.8)	62.7 (17.1)	69.7 (20.9)	76.0 (24.4)	78.9 (26.1)	77.9 (25.5)	72.5 (22.5)	62.8 (17.1)	52.2 (11.2)	43.2 (6.2)	60.9 (16.1)
Daily mean °F (°C)	31.9 (−0.1)	34.9 (1.6)	42.2 (5.7)	52.7 (11.5)	60.3 (15.7)	67.1 (19.5)	70.3 (21.3)	69.3 (20.7)	63.5 (17.5)	53.7 (12.1)	43.5 (6.4)	35.5 (1.9)	52.1 (11.2)
Mean daily minimum °F (°C)	23.8 (−4.6)	26.5 (−3.1)	33.0 (0.6)	42.6 (5.9)	50.9 (10.5)	58.3 (14.6)	61.8 (16.6)	60.7 (15.9)	54.5 (12.5)	44.6 (7.0)	34.7 (1.5)	27.9 (−2.3)	43.3 (6.3)
Mean minimum °F (°C)	4 (−16)	9 (−13)	14 (−10)	26 (−3)	37 (3)	48 (9)	54 (12)	54 (12)	42 (6)	30 (−1)	19 (−7)	11 (−12)	1 (−17)
Record low °F (°C)	−21 (−29)	−9 (−23)	−2 (−19)	11 (−12)	24 (−4)	31 (−1)	38 (3)	39 (4)	29 (−2)	13 (−11)	−5 (−21)	−25 (−32)	−25 (−32)
Average precipitation inches (mm)	3.03 (77)	2.90 (74)	3.84 (98)	3.64 (92)	4.61 (117)	4.14 (105)	4.36 (111)	3.14 (80)	3.24 (82)	2.78 (71)	2.55 (65)	3.01 (76)	41.24 (1,047)
Average snowfall inches (cm)	9.9 (25)	8.8 (22)	6.5 (17)	0.9 (2.3)	0.0 (0.0)	0.0 (0.0)	0.0 (0.0)	0.0 (0.0)	0.0 (0.0)	0.5 (1.3)	1.4 (3.6)	6.6 (17)	34.6 (88)
Average precipitation days (≥ 0.01 in)	13.5	13.5	15.3	13.7	15.4	13.7	13.6	11.4	10.0	10.2	10.5	13.4	154.2
Average snowy days (≥ 0.1 in)	6.6	6.3	4.1	1.1	0.0	0.0	0.0	0.0	0.0	0.3	1.6	5.2	25.2
Source: NWS Blacksburg / NOAA

== Demographics ==
Historical population
Census	Pop.	Note	%±
1890	1,775		—
1900	4,644		161.6%
1910	11,188		140.9%
1920	15,282		36.6%
1930	19,339		26.5%
1940	20,641		6.7%
1950	21,506		4.2%
1960	19,256		−10.5%
1970	15,921		−17.3%
1980	16,060		0.9%
1990	12,756		−20.6%
2000	11,451		−10.2%
2010	10,447		−8.8%
2020	9,658		−7.6%
2024 (est.)	9,157		−5.2%
U.S. Decennial Census

=== 2020 census ===
As of the 2020 census, Bluefield had a population of 9,658. The median age was 43.6 years. 20.7% of residents were under the age of 18 and 22.0% of residents were 65 years of age or older. For every 100 females there were 90.9 males, and for every 100 females age 18 and over there were 87.0 males age 18 and over.

96.4% of residents lived in urban areas, while 3.6% lived in rural areas.

There were 4,191 households in Bluefield, of which 25.0% had children under the age of 18 living in them. Of all households, 35.6% were married-couple households, 21.5% were households with a male householder and no spouse or partner present, and 36.1% were households with a female householder and no spouse or partner present. About 36.6% of all households were made up of individuals and 15.7% had someone living alone who was 65 years of age or older.

There were 5,198 housing units, of which 19.4% were vacant. The homeowner vacancy rate was 4.9% and the rental vacancy rate was 15.5%.

Racial composition as of the 2020 census
Race	Number	Percent
White	6,891	71.4%
Black or African American	2,107	21.8%
American Indian and Alaska Native	42	0.4%
Asian	44	0.5%
Native Hawaiian and Other Pacific Islander	2	0.0%
Some other race	70	0.7%
Two or more races	502	5.2%
Hispanic or Latino (of any race)	120	1.2%

=== 2010 census ===
As of the 2010 census, 10,447 people, 4,643 households, and 2,772 families were living in the city. The population density was 1,179.1 inhabitants per square mile (455.3/km^{2}). The 5,457 housing units had an average density of 615.9 per square mile (237.8/km^{2}). The racial makeup of the town was 73.7% White, 23.0% African American, 0.3% Native American, 0.5% Asian, 0.2% from other races, and 2.3% from two or more races. Hispanic or Latino people of any race were 0.9% of the population.

Of the 4,643 households, 26.1% had children under 18 living with them, 38.6% were married couples living together, 16.5% had a female householder with no husband present, 4.6% had a male householder with no wife present, and 40.3% were not families. About 35.0% of all households were made up of individuals, and 15.1% had someone living alone who was 65 or older. The average household size was 2.21 and the average family size was 2.83.

The median age in the city was 43.1 years; the age distribution was 20.8% under 18; 9.2% from 18 to 24; 22.2% from 25 to 44; 28.6% from 45 to 64; and 19.2% were 65 or older. The gender makeup of the city was 46.8% male and 53.2% female.

=== 2000 census ===
As of the 2000 census, 11,451 people, 5,038 households, and 3,078 families lived in the city. The population density was 1,311.3 people per square mile (506.4/km^{2}). The 5,966 housing units had an average density of 683.2 per square mile (263.9/km^{2}). The racial makeup of the city was 75.84% White, 22.14% African American, 0.12% Native American, 0.56% Asian, 0.01% Pacific Islander, 0.21% from other races, and 1.13% from two or more races. Hispanics or Latinos of any race were 0.52% of the population.

Of the 5,038 households, 24.7% had children under 18 living with them, 43.5% were married couples living together, 13.9% had a female householder with no husband present, and 38.9% were not families. About 34.9% of all households were made up of individuals, and 17.5% had someone living alone who was 65 or older. The average household size was 2.23 and the average family size was 2.87.

The age distribution was 21.9% under the age of 18, 9.0% from 18 to 24, 23.5% from 25 to 44, 24.5% from 45 to 64, and 21.5% who were 65 years of age or older. The median age was 42 years. For every 100 females, there were 84.4 males.

== Culture ==
Bluefield prides itself on its hospitable climate. Since 1938, the Chamber of Commerce has given free lemonade when the temperature has surpassed 90 °F. The city's motto is "nature's air conditioned city, where the summer spends the winter".

Jazz musician Louis Jordan's song "Salt Pork, W.Va." was inspired by his time in a Bluefield jail. The song "Sweet Georgia Brown" was co-written by Maceo Pinkard, a native of Bluefield. Bluefield is mentioned in the Stylistics' 1973 song Rockin' Roll Baby as the birthplace of Little Joe. Tyler Childers mentions Bluefield in the 2025 song "TomCat and a Dandy." A controversy exists over whether or not Hank Williams was last seen alive in Bluefield on his way to a show in Ohio. He was discovered dead in Oak Hill, West Virginia.

Lex Luger won the NWA United States Heavyweight Championship in Bluefield in a televised match on May 22, 1989, defeating Michael Hayes.

Bluefield was the hometown of fictional character Rita Stapleton Bauer on the CBS soap Guiding Light.

Ron Shelton, director and screenwriter of the 1988 film Bull Durham, played for the Bluefield Orioles in 1967. Furthermore, Bluefield is mentioned in the film.

"Bluefield" is the title of a song by Stonewall Jackson about the killing of the sheriff of Bluefield.

== Parks and recreation ==
Bluefield is a qualified Tree City USA as recognized by the National Arbor Day Foundation.

== Sports ==
Bluefield was the home of the Appalachian League (rookie) Bluefield Orioles baseball team until 2010. The Orioles have had a team in Bluefield since 1958, which was the longest relationship between a parent club and a town in affiliated baseball. The Toronto Blue Jays replaced Baltimore for the 2011 season with the Bluefield Blue Jays. The team played at Bowen Field (former Orioles stadium) through 2020. In conjunction with a contraction of Minor League Baseball beginning with the 2021 season, the Appalachian League was reorganized as a collegiate summer baseball league, and the Blue Jays were replaced by the Bluefield Ridge Runners, a new franchise in the revamped league designed for rising college freshman and sophomores.

Bluefield High School has many state championships in all sports, more than any other AA school in the state. Bluefield ranks second (tied with now-closed Ceredo-Kenova) in total football state championships with 11, behind national powerhouse Parkersburg High School (16). Bluefield won the High School State AAA Football Championship in 1959, 1962, 1965, 1967, 1975 and 1984. They won the West Virginia State AA football title in 1997, 2004, 2007, 2009 and 2017. Bluefield High School won the West Virginia AA State Championship in boys basketball in 1995, 1996, 2013 and 2014.

Bluefield is largely a football town and carries on a rivalry between the Bluefield Beavers and their sister city Bluefield, Virginia. The annual Beaver-Graham game is played at Mitchell Stadium, the home field of both schools.

Bluefield is also home to the East River Soccer Complex, which has five fields and hosts local high school and college soccer games. The Southern West Virginia King's Warriors of the USL PDL began to play their home games at the East River Soccer Complex in 2014 before dissolving in 2017.

Bluefield is also the home of the Rough and Rowdy Brawl, an amateur boxing tournament owned by Barstool Sports and broadcast on pay-per-view via its website. The tournament features many local and nonlocal fighters who compete in three one-minute rounds.

== Education ==
- Bluefield High School
- Bluefield State University
- Valley View Seventh-day Adventist School

== Transportation ==
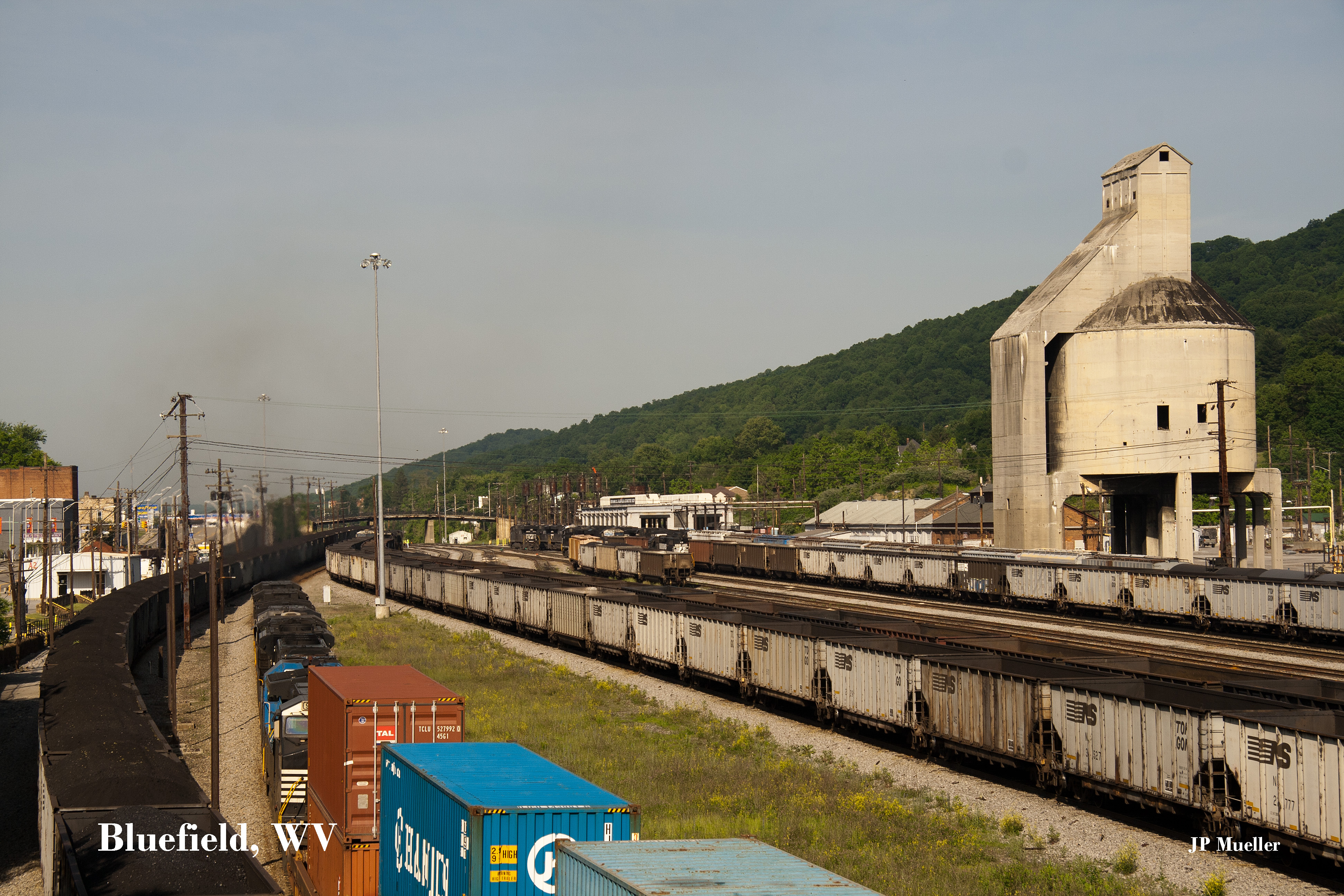
Norfolk Southern Railway's Bluefield Yard

=== Roadways ===
U.S. routes 19, 460, and 52 run through the city. Interstate 77 is a short distance to the east. Proposed and under construction are interstates 73 and 74, labeled as King Coal Highway.

=== Rail ===
The last passenger train was the Catlettsburg, Kentucky to Washington and Boston Hilltopper train of Amtrak, which was terminated in sweeping cuts in 1979. Until 1977, Amtrak's Mountaineer operated from Chicago and Cincinnati, through Bluefield, and then through lower Virginia to Norfolk, Virginia. Into the 1960s the Norfolk and Western Railroad operated trains from the Midwest to the metropolitan Norfolk-Newport News, Virginia, area, and Bluefield City was a stop. The station was located at 715 Princeton Avenue.

=== Air ===
General Aviation service is provided at Mercer County Airport, located off State Highway 123 between Bluefield and Princeton. The last commercial service by Colgan Air ended in 2007. This therefore makes Raleigh County Memorial Airport the nearest airport with commercial service.

=== Bus ===
Bluefield Area Transit provides bus routes throughout Mercer and McDowell Counties.
