= Ron Karabatsos =

American actor (1933–2012)

- Born: Ronald Christ Karabatsos; April 22, 1933; Elizabeth, New Jersey, U.S.
- Died: April 17, 2012 (aged 78); Beaumont, Riverside County, California, U.S.
- Occupation: Actor
- Years active: 1981–2004
- Spouses: Beverly Blair (m. 1982; died 1996); Janell (m. 1997–2012)
- Children: 2, 4 stepchildren (from Beverly)

Ronald Christ Karabatsos (April 22, 1933 – April 17, 2012) was an American character actor, who prior to his acting career worked as a Union City police detective.

== Early life ==
Karabatsos was born on April 22, 1933, in Elizabeth, New Jersey, USA, to Constantine and Antoinette Karabatsos, first-generation immigrants from Greece. He grew up in Union City, New Jersey, where young Ronald graduated from Emerson High School.

== Military and police service ==
Upon graduating from high school, Karabatsos was drafted in the U.S. Army spending most of his service time in the Korean War. After he was released from the military, he joined the police department of his home city, retiring after 28 years as a homicide detective.

== Movie career ==
In 1982, while still on the police force, Karabatsos was approached to act a part in the Sidney Lumet movie Prince of the City. Most New York critics and Roger Ebert wrote positive reviews on the movie. James Wolcott dissented, concluding that the film "[wore] its liberal pieties like a crown of thorns," although he reserved praise for Karabatsos' work, writing that he "carries his hulk with impressive menace as a slime-souled bail bondsman." Critic David S. Machlowitz, though agreeing with Wolcott's take on the movie, wrote that Karabatsos "is superb as [the] bloated, belligerent bail bondsman."

Karabatsos went on to act in some thirty movies and two hundred television shows, moving to live in California. He starred in the 1982 made-for-TV-movie Hear No Evil as Lt. Lew Healy.

He died on April 17, 2012, five days before his 79th birthday, in Beaumont, California, from a non-communicable disease, survived by wife Janell, daughter Dawnne Rigsby, and an extended family.

== Filmography ==
Year	Title	Role	Notes
1981	Prince of the City	Dave DeBennedeto	
1982	Cheers	Big Eddie	
1983	Flashdance	Jake Mawby	
1983	Blood Feud	Tony Buono	Television film
1984	The Cotton Club	Mike Best	
1987	Cold Steel	Fishman	
1987	Blood Vows: The Story of a Mafia Wife	Aldo	
1989	Wedding Band	Bruno Kavoles	
1989	Who's the Boss?	Ron	
1990	My Blue Heaven	Ritchie	
1990	Hollywood Heartbreak	L.R. Sharkey	
1991	Rich Girl	Rocco	
1991	29th Street	Philly "The Nap"	
1991	Where Sleeping Dogs Lie	Stan Reeb	
1991	Dead in the Water	Mike Welch	
1993	We're Back! A Dinosaur's Story		Voice
1993	Jailbait	Kelso	
1995	Get Shorty	Momo	
1996	Baby Face Nelson	Frankie "Big Frankie"	
2000	The Crew	Pauly "Fat Pauly"	
2004	Surviving Christmas	Deli Man	(final film role)
