= Robert Hanley =

American actor and entertainer

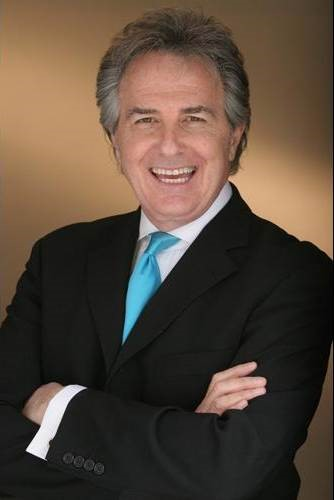
Hanley in 2010

Robert Hanley (born June 17, 1947), also known as Broadway Bob. and Bob Hanley, is an American actor, entertainer, comedian, singer, and writer. Hanley has been cast in over 100 starring and co-starring roles in television variety, comedy and drama series including Crazy Like a Fox with Jack Warden, and Pros & Cons with James Earl Jones and Richard Crenna. Hanley hosted television game shows for the ABC and CBS networks, and, as stand-up comedian Broadway Bob, appeared on The Merv Griffin Show. He headed Robert Hanley Actors Studio for eighteen years. Currently, as a singer/entertainer with his own seventeen-piece orchestra, he performs at civic and fundraising events. He is the founder of the nonprofit Entertainment Fellowship.

== Career ==
Hanley joined the U.S. Army in 1968 during the Vietnam era where he became an entertainment specialist, and wrote, directed, did stand-up comedy, and acted in numerous musical stage productions performed for the troops. Subsequently, Margaret "Skippy" Lynn, director of special services in Washington D. C., nominated Hanley for a scholarship to United States International University’s School of Performing Arts in San Diego, California, where he appeared in plays and musical productions, and received his Bachelor of Fine Arts degree. While there, he appeared locally in Actors' Equity Association theatre productions under notable directors including James Burrows. Afterward, he moved to Los Angeles where he quickly got television roles, beginning an over thirty-year career as an actor, entertainer, singer, stand-up comedian, writer, director, producer, and acting teacher.

Hanley started out in Hollywood doing hundreds of turns as warm-up host for network and syndicated television shows. This led to being cast on television variety, musical and comedy series. He was a regular on NBC’s The Mac Davis Show as well as guest star on The Carol Lawrence Show, Harry and the Hendersons, Madame’s Place, The New Gidget, and Mary Hartman, Mary Hartman.

As the stand-up comedian known as Broadway Bob, he performed on The Merv Griffin Show, and at The Comedy Store and The Improv. He served as network television game show host on ABC’s The Numbers Game, and CBS’s Fortune Hunters.

In television drama series, Hanley was cast in starring and supporting roles in The Practice, Crazy Like a Fox with Jack Warden, Pros & Cons with James Earl Jones and Richard Crenna, Hill Street Blues, Hunter, Fresno, Houston Knights, Riptide, Dragnet, Shell Game with Margot Kidder, The A-Team, and many others including the TV movie The Hit Man as well as thirty appearances on Days of Our Lives His feature film credits include Private Benjamin starring Goldie Hawn, I Married a Centerfold, L.A. Bounty, and Sparkle. Currently, as an entertainer with a strong comedy flare, Hanley fronts his own seventeen-piece orchestra, singing classics from the great American songbook. He has performed in the Los Angeles area for numerous major events including those at the Universal Hilton, Sheraton Universal, Four Seasons and Doubletree Hotels, CBS Studio Center, Warner Grand Theater, Pasadena Convention Center and The Canyon Club. In addition, Hanley headed Robert Hanley Actors Studio and Robert Hanley Musical, Drama and Theatre Institute at Debbie Reynolds Studios in North Hollywood, California where he taught and directed actors for eighteen years.

== Charitable work and other interests ==
Throughout his career, Hanley has worked with nonprofit, religious and charity groups as a producer, host, celebrity guest and performer.

Hanley was founder and CEO of the Entertainment Fellowship—a nonprofit organization of more than 4,000 actors, writers, directors, producers and others in the entertainment industry—which addressed ethics, morals and faith. Both the city and county of Los Angeles honored Hanley with their respective Humanitarian of the Year Awards.
