= Lenore Kasdorf =

American actress

- Born: July 27, 1948 (age 78); Fort Totten, New York City, New York, U.S.
- Occupation: Actress
- Years active: 1971–2004
- Known for: Rita Stapleton(Guiding Light)
- Spouse: Phil Peters
- Children: 1

Lenore Kasdorf (born July 27, 1948) is an American actress. She is known for her role as the alluring and promiscuous nurse Rita Stapleton Bauer, whom she played from 1975 to 1981 in the soap opera Guiding Light. Her other credits include the films Missing in Action, L.A. Bounty, and Starship Troopers.

== Early life ==
Kasdorf was born in Fort Totten, New York. Her father served in the United States Army and she attended International School Bangkok and Butler University in Indianapolis. She worked as a model while she attended Butler.

== Career ==
She has since appeared on the soaps Santa Barbara and Days of Our Lives, as well as a number of films. She costarred with Chuck Norris in 1984's Missing in Action. She also had a recurring role on the 1990s sitcom Coach. Other television credits include guest-starring roles on Jake and the Fatman, The A-Team, Knight Rider, Murder, She Wrote, Barnaby Jones, 21 Jump Street, The Six Million Dollar Man, NYPD Blue, Beverly Hills, 90210, Magnum P.I, Star Trek: The Next Generation, The Streets of San Francisco, In the Heat of the Night, and Babylon 5. Her last appearance was in the 2004 film Cellular.

== Personal life ==
Kasdorf married actor Phil Peters, and they have a daughter.

== Filmography ==
=== Film ===
Year	Title	Role	Notes
1972	Where Does It Hurt?	Dianne − Lester's girlfriend	
1973	Fly Me	Andrea	
1984	Missing in Action	Ann Fitzgerald	
1989	L.A. Bounty	Kelly Rhodes	
1990	Kid	Alice	
1992	Nervous Ticks	Katie	
1996	Amityville Dollhouse	Aunt Marla	Direct-to-video
1997	Starship Troopers	Mrs. Rico	
2004	Cellular	Ticket Checker	

=== Television ===
Year	Title	Role	Notes
1971	Night Gallery	Miss Wheeton	Episode: "Death in the Family/The Merciful/Class of '99/Witches' Feast"
1971	Bearcats!	Laura	Episode: "The Feathered Serpent"
1971	Monty Nash	Barbara	Episode: "The Visitor"
1971	Mannix	Michelle	Episode: "The Man Outside"
1972	The Sixth Sense	Karen	Episode: "Dear Joan: We're Going to Scare You to Death"
1972	Emergency!	Lynn	Episode: "Musical Mania"
1972–1975	The Streets of San Francisco	Various roles	3 episodes
1973	Banyon	Margie	Episode: "Time Lapse"
1973	The Mod Squad	Bev	Episode: "Put Out the Welcome Mat for Death"
1973	Love, American Style	Louise	Episode: "Love and the Hand Maiden/Hot Spell/Laughing Lover/Perfect Set-Up"
1973	Search	Addie	Episode: "Moment of Madness"
1973	The Magician	Jane Roberts	Episode: "The Vanishing Lady"
1973, 1974	Cannon	Anne Thorpe / Sherry Benson	2 episodes
1973, 1974	Ironside	Len's Girlfriend / Laura	2 episodes
1974	Chase	Betty	Episode: "Hot Beef"
1974	The Manhunter	Sally	Episode: "Pilot"
1974	Big Rose: Double Trouble	Waitress	Television film
1974	Barnaby Jones	Susan Meecham / Paula	2 episodes
1974	Alvin Karpis, Public Enemy No. 1 Film	Rita	Television film
1974	Kolchak: The Night Stalker	Girl	Episode: "Firefall"
1974	The Six Million Dollar Man	Sharon Ellis	Episode: "Act of Piracy"
1974	Crackle of Death	1st Girl − Janice	Television film
1974, 1975	Police Story	Gwen / Pearl	2 episodes
1975	Lucas Tanner	Ann Callahan	Episode: "The Noise of a Quiet Weekend"
1975	Starsky & Hutch	Kathi	Episode: "Death Notice"
1977–1981	Guiding Light	Rita	27 episodes
1983	Matt Houston	Heather Flynn	Episode: "Fear for Tomorrow"
1983	Magnum, P.I.	Savannah	Episode: "Smaller Than Life"
1983	T. J. Hooker	Officer Gina Canelli	Episode: "The Trial"
1984	Days of Our Lives	Dr. Veronica Kimball	4 episodes
1984	Lottery!	Dr. Newbury	Episode: "San Diego: Bingo!"
1984	Simon & Simon	Monica Powell	Episode: "What Goes Around Comes Around"
1984	The A-Team	Callie Russell	Episode: "Breakout!"
1984	Jessie	Sheila	Episode: "King of the Streets"
1984, 1986	Knight Rider	Karen Bennett / Lori Wainwright	2 episodes
1984–1992	Murder, She Wrote	Various roles	4 episodes
1985	Riptide	Annie Chambers	Episode: "Girls Night Out"
1985	Moonlighting	Vivian Baker	Episode: "Read the Mind... See the Movie"
1985	The Covenant	Cathy Resnick	Television film
1985	Stir Crazy	Sherry Knight	Episode: "Welcome to the Tribe"
1985	Airwolf	Jennie Burton	Episode: "Jennie"
1985	Hollywood Beat	Vicki Blum	Episode: "Out in the Cold"
1986	The Magical World of Disney	Arlene Kulick	Episode: "2 1/2 Dads"
1986	Fame	Laura Mattingly	Episode: "Contacts"
1986	Matlock	Cynthia Hyland	Episode: "The Seduction"
1986–1987	Santa Barbara	Caroline Wilson	87 episodes
1987	A Different Affair	Natalie	Television film
1988	Houston Knights	Lorraine	Episode: "Burnout"
1988	Highway to Heaven	Elizabeth Osbourne	Episode: "Whose Trash Is It Anyway?"
1989	21 Jump Street	Pam Daniels	Episode: "Parental Guidance Suggested"
1989	Dinner at Eight	Lucy Talbot	Television film
1989–1991	Jake and the Fatman	Various roles	3 episodes
1989–1992	Coach	Beth Fox	4 episodes
1990	The Flash	Mavis	Episode: "Shroud of Death"
1990	Dragnet	Detective Lyons	Episode: "DOA Cope"
1991	Beverly Hills, 90210	Suzanne	Episode: "Play It Again, David"
1991	The Woman Who Sinned	Jane Mary Woodman	Television film
1992	Pros and Cons	Sandy Morgan	Episode: "The Ex Spots the Mark"
1992	In the Heat of the Night	Ardiss Hollins Talbot	Episode: Fool for Love"
1992	A Murderous Affair: The Carolyn Warmus Story	Betty Jeanne Solomon	Television film
1992	Somebody's Daughter	Sydney	Television film
1992	Renegade	Georgia Warren	Episode: "Mother Courage"
1992	Revenge on the Highway	Shirley Trump	Television film
1993	Camp Wilder	Leigh	Episode: "I Love You, Margaret B. Sanger"
1993	Columbo	Janice	Episode: "It's All in the Game"
1993	Star Trek: The Next Generation	Lorin	Episode: "Attached"
1994	Children of the Dark	Peggy	Television film
1994	Babylon 5	ISN Reporter	3 episodes
1996	The Bold and the Beautiful	Pamela Gellar	4 episodes
1996	High Incident	Julie Jensen	5 episodes
1997	NYPD Blue	Mrs. Duffy	Episode: "Taillight's Last Gleaming"
2000	Get Real	Andrea Forman	Episode: "Waiting"
2002	The Agency	Mine	Episode: "Moo"
2003	The Division	Mrs. Willets	Episode: "Acts of Betrayal"
