= 2006 Minor League Baseball umpire strike =

The most recent umpire strike in Minor League Baseball history was the strike of 2006. It involved primarily a monetary dispute between the Association of Minor League Umpires (AMLU), a trade union, and the Professional Baseball Umpire Corporation (PBUC), a management company. The dispute resulted in the hiring of replacement umpires for a number of games, followed by minor concessions by both parties, resulting in a slight wage increase for umpires employed in Minor League Baseball.

== Parties involved ==
In 1999, the minor league umpires, under the umbrella of the Professional Baseball Umpire Corp (PBUC), unionized themselves and formed the Association of Minor League Umpires (AMLU). The following year, the AMLU signed a salary contract with the PBUC. The union was formed to provide support and protection for the umpires in contract negotiations with PBUC, which is in turn governed by the National Association of Professional Baseball Leagues (NAPBL, the formal name of Minor League Baseball). As of the 2006 strike, the president of the union was Andy Roberts, an International League umpire, while attorney George Yund and Pat O'Conner were key figures representing management and the minor leagues. O'Conner, then a vice president and the chief operating officer of Minor League Baseball, would be elected president of the minor leagues at the end of 2007. The AMLU represented about 220 umpires in then 16 different leagues within Minor League Baseball.

== Causes ==
The primary impetus for the strike came from AMLU's distaste for its umpires' salaries. Though salaries had always been rather low in accordance with PBUC's idea that umpiring was not a proper career, AMLU insisted that they had become too low. Umpires in Minor League Baseball made $15,000 in Triple-A, $12,000 in Double-A, $10,000 in full-season Class A, and $5,500 in rookie leagues. This was just a fraction of the salary of umpires in Major League Baseball, who were making from $84,000 to $300,000 annually. Many minor league umpires required an extra job or two during the off-season to make ends meet. However, the difficulty of the in-season schedule prevented the umpires from maintaining a second job during the baseball season. This led to a challenge in finding a steady job with an opportunity for advancement.

The strike began when irked umpires filed a lawsuit with the National Labor Relations Board (NLRB) in Florida against PBUC in mid-March on the grounds that PBUC threatened to fire those umpires who decided to strike. There was some speculation that the AMLU union umpires intended to strike in early 2006, just after their contracts expired in late 2005. When it was time to renew the expired contract, the AMLU umpires demanded salary increases, which the PBUC was unwilling to pay. It was decided then that the umpires would go on strike. The umpires refused to report for spring training, marking the beginning of their official strike of 2006. The first game of Minor League Baseball on April 4, 2006, began with a replacement umpire.

The umpires demanded a $100 per day salary increase and a $10 per diem increase. In the 2000 contract that AMLU initially signed with PBUC, rookie umpires were getting paid $1800 per month and senior umpires were getting paid up to $3400 per month. This salary was not enough, considering that their schedule only lasts for five to six months, leaving their annual salary at a meager $15,000 to $20,000. Per diem rates ranged from about $20 for rookie umpires to $25 for senior umpires. According to AMLU, the per diem rate in the 2000 contract was completely inadequate to meet the needs of umpires. Because the umpires spent the five-month season on the road, living in hotels and eating in restaurants, their daily food and gas expenses could not be met with the 2006 per diem rate first proposed by PBUC.

== During the strike ==
The dispute began in February 2006. As PBUC's contract with AMLU had expired in 2005, both groups were engaged in negotiating the terms of the next five-year contract for the umpires. Contention emerged over a salary hike proposed by PBUC, the first in almost a decade. PBUC offered a $100-per-month raise as well as an across-the-board increase of $1 per day to the per diem payments. The deal also included a proposal to raise the deductible for the umpires' health insurance from $100 to $500, reducing the effective amount of the salary hike. AMLU rejected the deal outright, claiming that it was insufficient to meet their needs. AMLU made an announcement on March 24, 2006, that they had filed unfair labor practice charges with the NLRB against PBUC. The umpires began to strike shortly thereafter.

The first minor leagues to announce that their umpires had failed to report on April 4 for opening day were the International League and Texas League. Umpires for the Southern League failed to report on April 5. April 6 was the national opening day for Minor League Baseball. A total of 220 umpires represented by the AMLU went on strike, refusing to report across 16 different leagues. Management (PBUC) issued a statement that they had made their best and final offer, and then announced that they would continue the season, implying that they would use replacement umpires in the place of the professional AMLU workers.

On May 11, some major league umpires joined with the AMLU umpires in a show of solidarity. Tim Timmons, Randy Marsh, Ángel Hernández, Hunter Wendelstedt and Sam Holbrook arrived in the picket line outside of Cooper Stadium in Columbus, Ohio, to strike alongside AMLU umpires.

== Replacements ==
For the duration of the strike, PBUC management called in replacement umpires for the 220 AMLU umpires on strike. These replacements consisted largely of umpires from college baseball and high school baseball. For fear of reprisals, PBUC refused to release the names of the replacements. A number of incidents involving the replacement umpires followed. Some players, coaches, managers and AMLU representatives placed the blame on the replacements.

One of the most publicized mishaps involving the replacements occurred on April 26 during a game in Pawtucket, Rhode Island. After striking out at the plate, a frustrated Delmon Young of the Durham Bulls threw his bat at an umpire in response to what he thought was a bad call. The bat hit the umpire, bringing criticism from Minor League Baseball and earning Young a 50-game suspension. In another incident, Birmingham Barons manager Chris Cron walked out in anger with his team in the eighth inning of a game against the Jacksonville Suns after the benches were vacated three separate times. After being ejected from a game on May 1, Ottawa Lynx manager Dave Trembley declared the replacement umpire’s performance as “the worst officiating [he had] ever seen in 20 years of professional baseball. [It was] an embarrassment to the International League and an embarrassment to [me]." One International League player remarked, "It's definitely not professional baseball the way they're calling balls and strikes. I've been called out twice on balls that bounced in the dirt. Definitely hitters are taking a beating and so are the pitchers. I know guys on our team are throwing pitches sometimes down the middle and (they're) getting called balls. And sometimes they're 10 inches outside and they're called strikes.

Both AMLU lawyer Robert Weaver and a National League scout criticized the skills of the replacements. Weaver said of the replacement umpires' performances, “It's definitely inconsistent and it's affecting careers. Players' numbers are down. I think the league ERA is an earned run lower than it was last year." Management within PBUC as well as Minor League Baseball remained supportive of the replacement umpires. Both PBUC and Minor League Baseball denied the charges made by players, managers, AMLU and coaches that the replacement umpires were unprofessional, lacking the experience and skills to manage the players and make the proper calls. Pat O'Conner later praised the replacement umpires for their efforts, noting that they had done quite well during the strike and would be used again should an AMLU umpire became injured or sick.

== Agreement ==
After a few grueling weeks of the strike, negotiations were finally settled between AMLU and PBUC on May 30. The umpires who had been on strike agreed to resume work by June 12. An earlier contract proposal had been rejected by AMLU by a two-to-one margin. Days later, along with the help of a federal mediator, the two sides were able to devise a new contract. Through the use of collective bargaining and their labor strike, umpires were able to negotiate an increase to their per diem payments by $3, up to a maximum of $40 depending on the league. As for monthly salaries, there was an increase of $100, also a part of the six-year agreement. Minor League Baseball and PBUC were in agreement with the arrangement. Pat O'Conner stated that he was "happy to have reached a deal that will assure labor peace with [the] umpires through the 2011 season."

== See also ==
- 1999 Major League Umpires Association mass resignation
