= Pat O'Conner =

American baseball executive

Pat O’Conner
- Born: James Patrick O'Conner; 1958 (age 67–68); Grove City, Ohio, U.S.
- Education: Ohio University; Wittenberg University
- Known for: Minor League Baseball president (2008–2020)
- Awards: South Atlantic League Hall of Fame (2000); Ohio University Distinguished Alumni Award (1997); Friends of Baseball Chapel Award (2005); Florida State League Hall of Fame (2014)

James Patrick O'Conner (born 1958) is an American professional baseball executive who served as president of Minor League Baseball for the 2008 through 2020 baseball seasons.

== Early life ==
Born in Grove City, Ohio, O'Conner attended Wittenberg University in Springfield, Ohio, where he earned a degree in economics and finance, and later graduated with a masters in sports administration from Ohio University in Athens, Ohio.

== Professional career ==
O'Conner started his baseball career working as administrative assistant for the Vero Beach Dodgers of the Florida State League in 1981. After that, he spent 1982 as general manager for the Greenwood Pirates of the South Atlantic League, and followed with two seasons as assistant general manager for the Beaumont Golden Gators of the Texas League. In 1986, he headed the Florida Operations for the Houston Astros, as well as serving as general manager of the Osceola Astros of the Florida State League from 1986 to 1993. He was named Florida State League Executive of the Year in his last season.

=== Minor League Baseball ===
O'Conner joined the Minor League Baseball (MiLB) staff as chief operating officer under president Mike Moore in 1993. He then was promoted to the vice president and administration office in 1995, and was elected the 11th president of the organization during the Winter Meeting held in December 2007. He later was re-elected for a second term in 2011.

Highlights of his tenure include the extension of the Professional Baseball Agreement with Major League Baseball (MLB) through the 2020 season, as well as a five-year collective bargaining agreement with the Association of Minor League Umpires through 2016. This agreement signed by O'Conner contributed to end a 67-day Minor League umpires' strike, which lasted from April 6 to June 12, 2006. Additionally, O'Conner promoted the realignment of two Class A leagues, the organization-wide bundling of internet rights for the first time, an industry-wide health care program, and a "green team" initiative to make MiLB clubs and stadiums more eco-friendly and cost effective.

In advance of the expiration of the Professional Baseball Agreement at the end of the 2020 season (which would lead to the restructuring of MiLB by MLB) O'Connor announced his retirement in September 2020, effective at the end of the baseball season.

=== Awards and recognition ===
During his career, O'Conner has received numerous recognitions for his dedication to baseball. In 1997, he received the Distinguished Alumni Award from the Ohio University Sports Administration Program, as he continued to be involved with the program since his graduation. In 2004, O'Conner made the announcement of his gift to create the J. Patrick O'Conner Sports Administration Scholarship. O'Conner said that the Sport Administration and Facility Management program had provided outstanding opportunity for him and he would not want a lack of resources to stand between an excellent student and similar opportunity in the future. He later received the College of Health and Human Services Award of Distinction from Ohio University in 2005. O'Conner was inducted into the South Atlantic League Hall of Fame in 2000, was honored with the Friends of Baseball Chapel Award in 2005, and gained induction into the Florida State League Hall of Fame in 2014.
