= Sal Artiaga =

American baseball executive (1946–2019)

- Born: August 4, 1946; Los Lunas, New Mexico, U.S.
- Died: February 16, 2019 (aged 72); Palm Harbor, Florida, U.S.
- Occupation: Minor League Baseball president
- Years active: 1988–1991

Salomon B. Artiaga (August 4, 1946 – February 16, 2019) was an American baseball executive, whose most significant role was as president of the National Association of Professional Baseball Leagues from 1988 through 1991.

== Early life ==
Artiaga was born in Los Lunas, New Mexico, from Spanish descent. He was praised in baseball circles for helping and teaching Latino ballplayers in many aspects of the game, through cultural assimilation programs designed to prepare them for life in the United States, spending almost a half century in organized baseball working in different capacities for several organizations. In addition, he has authored many books to assist young Latin American players transition in their new environment.

Artiaga began his baseball career in 1965 with the Double-A El Paso Sun Kings of the Texas League, where he worked as assistant business manager for the team. He then spent two years with the Class-A Tampa Tarpons of the Florida State League, first as its business manager and later as the general manager.

Following that, Artiaga was with the Cincinnati Reds organization in the scouting and player development department from 1967 through 1982. He then moved to the National Association of Professional Baseball Leagues office in 1983, serving as administrator under president John H. Johnson.

At the time, the NAPBL attained attendance levels that had not been approached in nearly 40 years, while franchise values increased dramatically. In his new role, Artiaga helped draft the new disposition involving free agency for Minor League players, the so-called six-year free agent rule, which keeps a veteran player from being stuck in one farm system. Johnson, who was re-elected to a three-year term in 1986, died in January 1988 and Artiaga succeeded him in the presidency three months later. During his first year in office, Artiaga saw the Minor Leagues raise to over 21,659,000 fans in attendance with 188 clubs.

Artiaga remained in office until 1991. After that, he worked one season as president of the Arizona Fall League and served as coordinator of cultural development for the Chicago White Sox from 1993 to 1999. Additionally, he headed a committee that organized the Venezuelan Summer League, which was launched in 1997 as an alternative to the Dominican Summer League to improve the development of young prospects from Venezuela in their early years in organized baseball. In between, he supervised presentations on steroid use during visits to its development academies.

Artiaga then found himself on the move again, this time as director of Latin American operations for the Philadelphia Phillies during 11 years spanning 1999–2009. Afterward, he became the coordinator of cultural development for the Kansas City Royals for three years before retiring in 2012, ending 48 years of service in professional baseball. He died on February 16, 2019, in Palm Harbor, Florida.
