= Mike Moore (baseball executive) =

American baseball executive (1941–2022)

- Born: November 25, 1941; Columbus, Indiana, U.S.
- Died: February 3, 2022 (aged 80); Brooksville, Florida, U.S.
- Spouse: Barbara
- Children: 5

Mike Moore (November 25, 1941 – February 3, 2022) was an American baseball executive. He served as president of the National Association of Professional Baseball Leagues from 1991 through 2007.

== Early life and career ==
Moore was born and raised in Columbus, Indiana. He enrolled at the University of Tampa in 1960 and played college baseball for the Tampa Spartans as a catcher. After suffering a shoulder injury, he called Spartans baseball games on the college radio station and managed the station. Moore earned a degree in business education in 1963.

After Moore graduated, he became the University of Tampa's sports information director. He hosted a country music radio show on WYOU, was a sports reporter for WTVT, and a ring announcer for Championship Wrestling from Florida.

From 1971 to 1988, he served as vice president, general manager and part owner of the Tampa Tarpons, a Florida State League affiliate of the Cincinnati Reds organization. During the 1970s, Tampa was in the farm system of the Cincinnati Reds, and he worked with their general manager, Bob Howsam, who put together the Big Red Machine.

== National Association of Professional Baseball Leagues ==
In 1988 Moore worked as chief administrative officer for the National Association of Professional Baseball Leagues (NAPBL), working with president Sal Artiaga. Moore was elected the 10th president of the NAPBL in December 1991. One of his most important moves came in 1992, when he was to convene a constitutional convention that would rewrite the National Association Agreement, which controlled the relationship between the NAPBL and its member leagues. The aforementioned agreement had not materially changed since the organization was founded in 1901.

Another important change was converting the NAPBL to more of a corporate structure than a political one, which prompted an intensively grown organization under his leadership. Back to 1991, prior to becoming President, Moore established an agency agreement partnership between the Professional Baseball Promotion Corporation, a NAPBL subsidiary, and Major League Baseball Properties to authorize licensed merchandise.

Moore was elected to four terms as president, winning re-election three times without opposition. As attendance increased steadily over the years, Minor League Baseball set a new all-time attendance record of 42.8 million fans in 2007, the last season for Moore after spending 16 years in the office.

In 2009, Moore became an inaugural inductee in the Florida State League Hall of Fame.

== Personal life ==
Moore and his wife, Barbara, had five children and nine grandchildren.

== Death ==
Moore died at Oak Hill Hospital in Brooksville, Florida, after a long illness on February 3, 2022, at the age of 80.
