= Minor League Baseball =

Hierarchy of professional baseball leagues affiliated with Major League Baseball

- Sport: Baseball
- Founded: September 5, 1901; 125 years ago
- Owner: MLB
- No. of teams: 202
- Countries: United States (149 teams); Canada (1 team) + Dominican Republic (Rookie League) (52 teams) (as of 2026 season)
- Headquarters: New York City, U.S.
- Broadcasters: Stadium, Bally Live App; MiLB.tv, local tv stations
- Website: MiLB.com

Minor League Baseball (MiLB) is a group of professional baseball organizations below Major League Baseball (MLB), constituted of teams affiliated with MLB teams. The earliest minor league baseball organization was founded on September 5, 1901, in response to the growing dominance of the National League and American League, as the National Association of Professional Baseball Leagues (NAPBL or NA).

MiLB originated as simply the organization of lower tiers of professional baseball in the United States, consisting of teams that lacked the financial means to compete with the National League and later the American League. The association of minor leagues remained independent throughout the early 20th century, protected by agreements with the major leagues to ensure they were compensated when minor-league players were signed by major-league clubs. Later, MiLB evolved to be constituted entirely of affiliates of larger clubs, giving young prospects a chance to develop their skills before competing in the major leagues.

MiLB teams sign Professional Development League licenses with MLB clubs, requiring that Major League affiliates provide and pay for players and staff for affiliate clubs. In exchange, MLB affiliates maintain full control of the players and may freely move them between levels of play.

MiLB consists of several levels of play. MLB prospects play at each level, typically beginning at the lowest level and earning promotion to higher levels. There are, however, no strict requirements for advancement; prospects may skip levels and some may rarely skip the Minor Leagues altogether. MiLB's levels have been restructured several times, with teams both added and contracted. Most recently, the league eliminated the Short-Season A and Rookie Advanced levels of MiLB in 2021. The five domestic levels of MiLB today are, from lowest to highest, Rookie League, (Note: The Rookie Leagues are fully owned by MLB. While not organizationally part of MiLB, they are listed by MiLB as part of the minor-league hierarchy.) Single-A, High-A, AA (or Double-A) and AAA (or Triple-A). MiLB has also included several foreign leagues throughout its existence, with the only active affiliate being the Dominican Summer League.

Entering the 2021 season, MLB began a significant restructuring of MiLB, reducing the total number of teams to 120 teams (four per each of the 30 MLB franchises) across the four full-season divisions of play. There are also two affiliated rookie leagues based in the United States, with teams based at the parent clubs' spring training complexes in Arizona and Florida; an off-season autumn league; and one affiliated rookie league in the Dominican Republic. Additionally, four independent baseball leagues, comprising teams that are not affiliated with any Major League club, are designated Partner Leagues of MLB.

== History ==
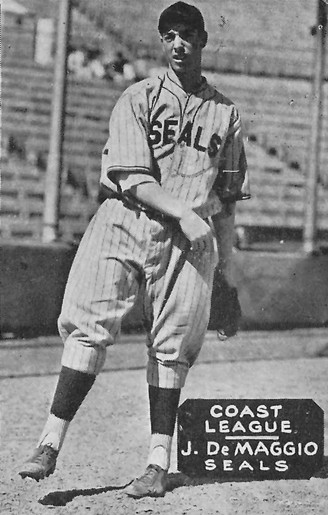
Joe DiMaggio during his time playing in the Pacific Coast League, c. 1930s

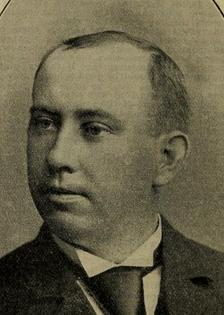
Patrick T. Powers, the first president of the National Association of Professional Base Ball Players

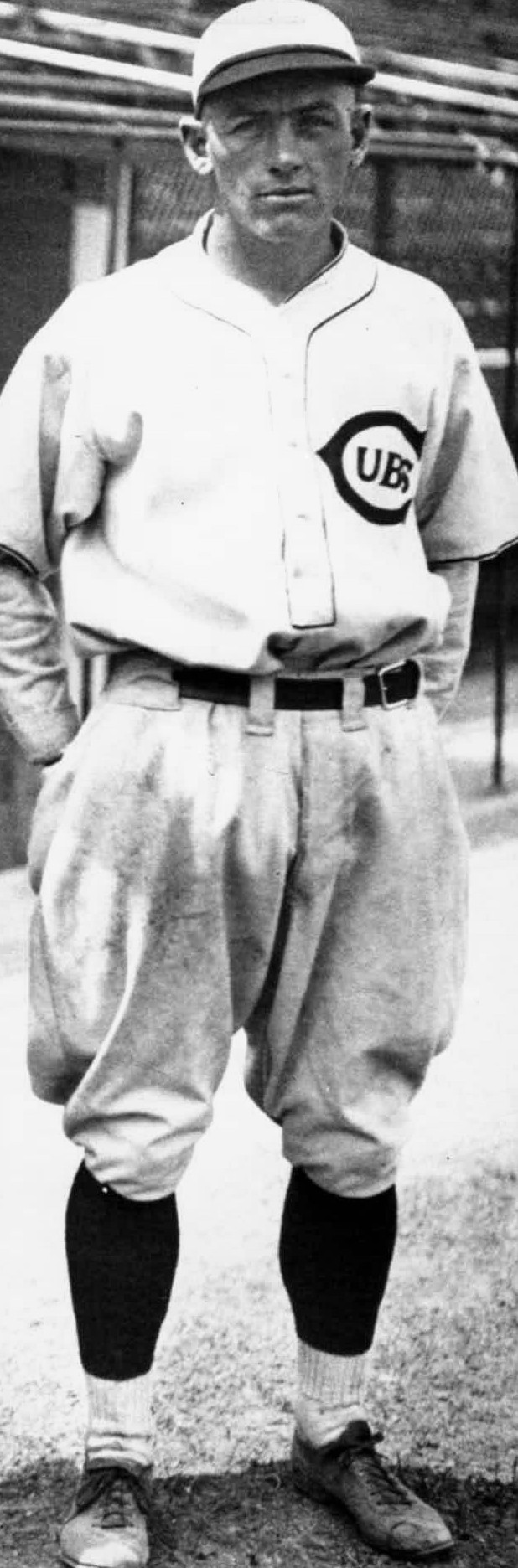
Jigger Statz played in over 2500 minor league games.

The earliest professional baseball league, the National Association of Professional Base Ball Players of 1871 to 1875, commonly referred to as the National Association, (Note: The "National Association" of 1871–1875 is not to be confused with the "National Association" formed in 1901 that came to be known as Minor League Baseball.) comprised all fully professional teams. This system proved unworkable, however, as there was no way to ensure competitive balance. Financially unsound clubs often folded during the season. The National League (NL) was founded in 1876 with a limited membership which excluded less competitive and financially weaker teams, allowing for the most prosperous teams to compete against each other. Professional clubs outside the NL responded by forming regional associations of their own. There was a series of ad hoc groupings, such as the New England Association of 1877 and the Eastern Championship Association of 1881. These were loose groups of independent clubs that agreed to play a series of games over the course of one season for a championship pennant.

Traditionally, the first true minor league is considered to be the Northwestern League of 1883 to 1884. Unlike the earlier minor associations, it was conceived as a permanent organization. It also, along with the NL and the American Association (AA), was a party to the National Agreement of 1883. Included in this was the agreement to respect the reserve lists of clubs in each league. Teams in the NL and the AA could only reserve players who had been paid at least $1,000. Northwestern League teams could reserve players paid $750, implicitly establishing the division into major and minor leagues. Over the next two decades, more minor leagues signed various versions of the National Agreement. Eventually, the minor leagues allied to negotiate collectively.

In the late 1890s, the Western League run by Ban Johnson decided to challenge the NL's position. In 1900, he changed the name of the league to the American League (AL) and vowed to make deals to sign contracts with players who were dissatisfied with the pay and terms of their deals with the NL. This led to a turf war that would lead Patrick T. Powers, president of the Eastern League, and many other minor league owners to fear how the conflict might affect their organizations. Representatives of the different minor leagues met at the Leland Hotel in Chicago on September 5, 1901. In response to the NL–AL battle, they agreed to form the National Association of Professional Baseball Leagues (NAPBL), sometimes shortened to National Association (NA), which would later adopt the trade name "Minor League Baseball". The purpose of the NAPBL at the time was to maintain the independence of the leagues involved. Several did not sign the agreement and continued to work independently. Powers was made the first president of the NAPBL, whose offices were established in Auburn, New York.

=== Formation of the National Baseball Commission ===
In 1903, the conflict between the AL and NL ended in the National Agreement of 1903, which created the National Baseball Commission to oversee the major and minor leagues. The NAPBL became involved in the later stages of the negotiations to develop rules for the acquisition of players from their leagues by the NL and the AL. The 1903 agreement ensured that teams would be compensated for the players that they had taken the time and effort to scout and develop, and no NA team was required to sell their players, although most did because the cash was an important source of revenue for most teams. The NA leagues were still fiercely independent, and the term minor was seldom used in reference to them save by major-market sportswriters. At this point, the disparity in quality of play between major and minor leagues was less significant: Many baseball writers of that time regarded the greatest players of the minor leagues, such as Buzz Arlett, Jigger Statz, Ike Boone, Buddy Ryan, Earl Rapp, and Frank Shellenback, as comparable to major league players.

The official relationship between the minor and major leagues was challenged throughout the existence of the Federal League. The league, an upstart challenger to the traditional major leagues, would frequently "raid" the minor leagues for talent throughout its brief existence. Certain member teams of the minor leagues advocated abandoning their relationship with the American and National Leagues to join the Federal League; however, this was rendered moot after the Federal League folded in 1915.

The relationship between the minor and major leagues again came into question following the First World War. In 1918, many minor leagues cut their seasons short due to players leaving for war. The major leagues did not shorten their seasons but did similarly struggle with player shortages. As such, the Commission allowed major leagues to sign minor-league players for the duration of the season.

However, a dispute arose about the rights to minor-league players following the 1918 season. Several major-league clubs claimed ownership over temporarily signed players, while their former minor-league clubs still claimed control. Notably, pitcher Jack Quinn was involved in a rights dispute. He had played for the Chicago White Sox in 1918 after the end of the Pacific Coast League season. After the season, his club, the Vernon Tigers, sold his rights to the New York Yankees. The White Sox, however, claimed to retain his rights. The Commission ultimately sided with the Tigers and Yankees. The incident severely damaged league-wide confidence in the Commission, serving as a factor in the eventual dissolution of the National Commission and creation of the office of the Commissioner of Baseball.

=== Emergence of the farm system ===
In 1921, MLB and MiLB signed an agreement allowing Major League teams to own Minor League teams. St. Louis Cardinals executive Branch Rickey used this agreement to develop a farm system for his team, purchasing lower-level clubs and using them to develop prospects prior to debuting in the Major Leagues. Commissioner Kenesaw Mountain Landis initially resisted Rickey's plan but, ultimately, the Great Depression drove teams to establish systems like Rickey's to ensure a steady supply of players, as many NA and independent teams could not afford to keep their doors open without the patronage of MLB. The leagues of the NA became subordinate to the major leagues, creating the first minor leagues in the current sense of the term. With the exception of the Pacific Coast League (PCL), which under its president Pants Rowland tried to become a third major league in the Western states, the other leagues maintained autonomy in name only, being totally economically dependent upon the AL and NL.

The 1922 Supreme Court decision Federal Baseball Club v. National League (259 U.S. 200), which grants baseball a special immunity from antitrust laws, had a major effect on the minor leagues. The special immunity meant that the AL and NL could dictate the terms under which every independent league did business. By 1925, MLB established a flat-fee purchase amount of $5,000 for the contract of any player from an NA member league team. This measure was leveled primarily at the Baltimore Orioles, then a Triple-A team that had dominated the minors by keeping players longer than many competitors. Baltimore thus allowed players to more fully develop, driving up their sale value to major-league teams and giving Baltimore a talent advantage. Deprived of this option by the flat-fee policy, minor-league teams had little choice but to sell players as soon as they drew major-league interest.

==== Resistance to the farm system ====
Although the 1922 decision essentially guaranteed Major League financial dominance over the Minor Leagues, there was still resistance to the development of the farm system. Kenesaw Mountain Landis, Commissioner of Baseball, was reportedly "never a fan of the farm teams owned by major-league teams". Landis released numerous baseball players to free agency following perceived abuses of the farm system. For example, in 1930, Landis released Fred Bennett to free agency after the St. Louis Browns sent him to play in their farm system for a third consecutive year, then seen as a violation of the player's rights. This led to a legal battle with a court voiding the "secret absolute control" of players in 1931 without eliminating the farm system. However, later rule changes by the owners formalized and limited major league clubs' ability to "option" players to the minors. Such changes largely voided the 1931 decision within the next few years.

Landis continued to fight to limit the extent of major-league control over the minor leagues, frequently seeking to curb unofficial affiliation and club control. Following an investigation of six teams in the St. Louis farm system in 1938, Landis ultimately released 74 players to free agency and fined the Cardinals $2,176, citing that the teams in question "were merely adjuncts to the St. Louis system". On similar grounds, he released 90 Detroit Tigers minor leaguers in 1939.

=== Postwar history ===
MiLB would peak in popularity in the years after World War II. In 1949, 448 teams played across 59 leagues in Canada, Mexico, and the United States, with all minor leagues combining for 39 million attendees that year. However, the rise of television in years after led to many minor-league clubs losing supporters for now-watchable major-league teams. Minor-league teams maintained territorial rights and had the option to refuse to let MLB teams air on television in their territory. Fearing insolvency, MiLB agreed to allow MLB to air on television in their territory in exchange for a share of television profits and financial support.

In 1962, MLB and MiLB agreed to terms that would largely end minor-league independence: major-league clubs would sign player development contracts (PDCs) with minor-league teams, requiring that a major-league club provide and pay for a full team of players for its affiliate in exchange for full control over the players. With this, minor-league teams were required to hand over control of their rosters to MLB partners. Though only a few minor-league clubs are directly owned by MLB teams, every MiLB team today requires an MLB affiliate.

MiLB's popularity would recover in the 1990s and continue to grow throughout the 2000s, reaching a new peak attendance of 41.6 million in 2009. In 2021, MiLB saw its size significantly reduced when MLB disaffiliated itself from nearly a quarter of all MiLB clubs and eliminated several levels of minor-league play.

== Classification history ==
=== 19th century ===
The earliest classifications used in the minor leagues began circa 1890, for teams that were party to the National Agreement of 1883. The different levels represented different levels of protection for player contracts and reserve clauses:

- Class A: contracts and reserve lists protected
- Class B: contracts and reserve lists protected, but a major league team could draft a player for a set price
- Class C: contracts protected
- Class D: contracts protected, but any higher class could draft a player for a set price
- Class E/F: no protection

=== 20th century ===
After the National Association of Professional Baseball Leagues was founded in 1901, classifications were redefined:

Class	Aggregate population of cities in the league	Salary cap (per month) team / player	Draft fee†	Protection fee‡
Class A	more than 1 million	$1800 / $175	n/a	$50
Class B	400,001 to 1 million	$1000 / $125	$300	$30
Class C	200,001 to 400,000	$800 / $100	$200	$20
Class D	up to 200,000	$700 / $75	$100	$10

† Draft fee set an amount for a team in a higher class to select a player; n/a for Class A as it would be up to each team to negotiate with an interested major league club.
‡ Protection fee reserved a player to a team, even after a contract expired, preventing the player for seeking employment with any other team.

All minor leagues were classified, and had the following assignments entering the 1902 season:

- Class A: Eastern League, Western League
- Class B: Connecticut State League, New England League, New York State League, Pacific Northwest League, Southern League, Three-I League
- Class C: no league until 1903
- Class D: Cotton States League, Iowa–South Dakota League, Missouri Valley League, North Carolina League, Pennsylvania State League, Texas League

Additional classifications added prior to World War II included:

- Class AA ("Double-A"): added in 1912 as the new highest level. Double-A remained the highest level through 1945.
- Class A1: added in 1936, between Class A and Class AA. Two Class A circuits, the Texas League and the Southern Association, were upgraded to A1 to signify their continued status as one step below the highest classification, then Double-A, and a notch above their former Class A peers, the New York–Pennsylvania League and Western League. Class A1 remained in use through 1945.
- Class E: added in 1937, as the new lowest level, for players with no professional experience in Class D or higher. The only Class E league that existed was the four-team Twin Ports League, which operated for less than a full season in 1943.

==== Postwar changes ====
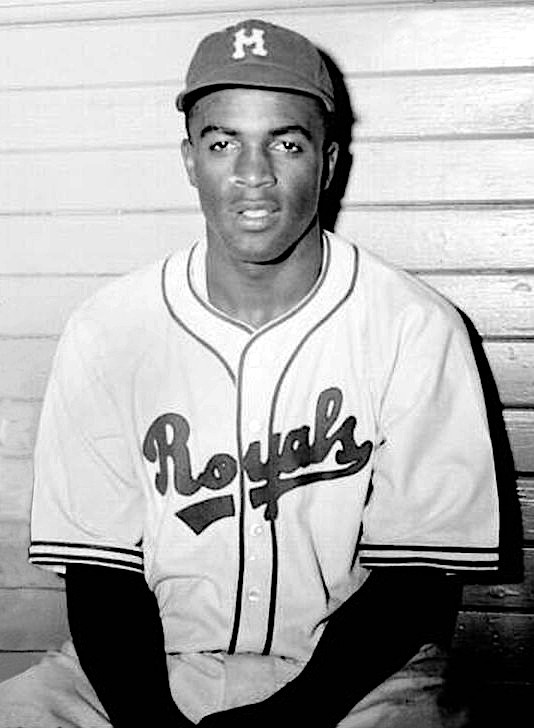
Jackie Robinson with the Triple-A Montreal Royals in July 1946

In 1946, with the minor leagues poised for unprecedented growth, the higher-level classifications were changed. Class AAA ("Triple-A") was created and the three Double-A circuits (the Pacific Coast League, International League, and the American Association) were reclassified into Triple-A. Class A1 (comprising the Texas League, which had last operated in 1942, and the Southern Association) became Class AA. Class A remained the third-highest classification, with lower levels still ranked Class B through Class D in descending order, with Class D being the equivalent of later Rookie leagues. The impact of the Korean War in 1950 caused a player shortage in many cities below Class B.

In 1952, the "Open" classification was created. The Pacific Coast League (PCL), which had been rated Triple-A since 1946, was the only minor league to obtain this classification, which it retained through 1957. At this time, the major leagues only extended as far west as St. Louis, Missouri, and as far south as Washington, D.C. This classification severely restricted the rights of the major leagues to draft players out of the PCL, and at the time it seemed like the PCL would eventually become a third major league. The PCL would revert to Triple-A in 1958, due to increasing television coverage of major league games and in light of the Dodgers and Giants moving to Los Angeles and San Francisco, respectively.

=== Reorganization of 1963 ===
A significant reorganization of the minor leagues took place in 1963, caused by the contraction of clubs and leagues during the 1950s and early 1960s. In 1949, the peak of the postwar minor league baseball boom, 448 teams in 59 leagues were members of the National Association of Professional Baseball Leagues, with the number of teams falling to 324 in 1952, and 243 in 1955. By the end of 1963, only 15 leagues above Rookie-level survived in the United States and Canada.

After the 1962 season, the Triple-A American Association—which had lost key markets such as Milwaukee, Kansas City, Minneapolis–Saint Paul and Houston to the Major Leagues since 1953—disbanded. The surviving International and Pacific Coast leagues absorbed the four remaining American Association franchises. Meanwhile, at the Double-A level and below there were even more significant changes:

- The two existing Class A circuits—the Eastern League and South Atlantic League—were upgraded to Double-A, joining the Texas League and the unaffiliated Mexican League, then Double-A, as members of this classification. This move was caused by the disbanding of the Southern Association after 1961, leaving the six-team Texas League as the only US-based Double-A circuit in 1962. In addition, many Major League parent teams had frequently treated the pre-1963 Eastern League and South Atlantic League as de facto Double-A circuits, one step (rather than two) below Triple-A.
- The Class B Carolina League and Northwest League, the Class C California League, Pioneer League and Northern League, and the Class D Florida State League, Georgia–Florida League, Midwest League, New York–Penn League, and Western Carolinas League were all designated Class A leagues. The unaffiliated Class C Mexican Central League was also designated as Class A.
- The Class D Appalachian League, then the only "short-season" circuit, was given a new designation as a Rookie league.

Designations below Class A disappeared because the lower levels could not sustain operation during a large downturn in the financial fortunes of minor league baseball, due to factors including the rise of television broadcasts of major league sports across broad regions of the country. As part of the 1963 reorganization, Major League clubs increased their commitments to affiliate with minor league teams through Player Development Contracts, outright ownerships, or shared affiliations and co-op arrangements.

=== Changes between 1963 and 2021 ===
The minor league system that evolved following the 1963 reorganization remained in place through 2020, categorizing leagues into one of six classes: Triple-A (AAA), Double-A (AA), Class A-Advanced (High A or A+), Class A (Low A), Class A Short Season, and Rookie. Furthermore, Rookie was further informally subdivided into Rookie Advanced, complex-based Rookie, and international summer baseball.

- Triple-A: The American Association was revived as a Triple-A league in 1969 and flourished with the minor league baseball boom of the 1980s and 1990s. However, all of its teams were again absorbed into the International and Pacific Coast leagues in 1998 as part of a sweeping reorganization of the minors' top classification. The American Association and the International League also played an interlocking schedule during the late 1980s as part of the Triple-A Alliance. The Mexican League was upgraded from Double-A to Triple-A in 1967.
- Double-A: In 1964, the South Atlantic League changed its name to Southern League. In 1971, because of continued contraction (and Major League expansion) that left each circuit with only seven teams, the Texas League and Southern League formed the 14-team Dixie Association. The arrangement lasted only for that season, and the records and history of the constituent leagues were kept distinct. In 1972, each league added an eighth team, rebalancing their schedules. The leagues subsequently returned to prosperity with the revival of minor league baseball that began in the 1980s.
- Class A: In 1980, the Western Carolinas League changed its name, reviving the historic South Atlantic ("Sally") League moniker. Additionally, over time, two more classifications evolved from Class A. Under the rules governing the affiliated minor leagues, these became separate classifications, despite the similarity in name:
  - Beginning in 1965, Class A Short Season leagues played approximately 75 to 80 games per season, starting in mid-June and ending in early September, designed to allow college players to complete their college seasons in the spring, be selected in the MLB draft in June, signed, and then immediately placed in a competitive league. The classification was eliminated prior to the 2021 season, with the New York–Penn League and Northwest League as the only active leagues at this level at the time of the reorganization.
  - The Class A-Advanced classification, one rung below Double-A, was introduced in 1990 for the California League, Carolina League, and Florida State League, splitting the Class A level even further. Entering the 2021 season, three new "High-A" leagues were introduced in replacement of prior leagues at this level.
- Rookie Advanced: The Appalachian League and Pioneer League were classified as Rookie Advanced leagues beginning in 1991. The players in these leagues were thought to be further along in their development than players in the pure Rookie leagues, and hence games were more competitive. Teams in these leagues were allowed to sell concessions and charge admission. In practice, many major league teams would have either one affiliate at this level or one affiliate in Class A Short Season but not both, making them de facto equivalent. The Rookie Advanced classification was eliminated prior to the 2021 season.
- Rookie: In 1964, the Pioneer League stepped down from Class A to Rookie league status, and the first "complex-based" leagues, the Sarasota Rookie League and the Cocoa Rookie League, made their debuts. The Sarasota Rookie League underwent a name change to the Florida Rookie League in 1965 before becoming the Gulf Coast League the next season. The Cocoa Rookie League lasted only one season, and the Florida East Coast League of 1972, based in the same region of the state, also existed for only one year. In 1989, a counterpart to the Gulf Coast League, the Arizona League, made its debut and it continues to operate as a Rookie-level league for MLB teams with spring training facilities based in Arizona.

There were some failed start-up leagues. During the 1970s, three official minor leagues (members of NAPBL) attempted unsuccessfully to revive unaffiliated baseball (teams not associated with specific MLB franchises) within the organized baseball structure. These were the Class A Gulf States League (1976) and Lone Star League (1977), and the Triple-A Inter–American League (1979). None lasted more than a full season.

=== Reorganization of 2021 ===
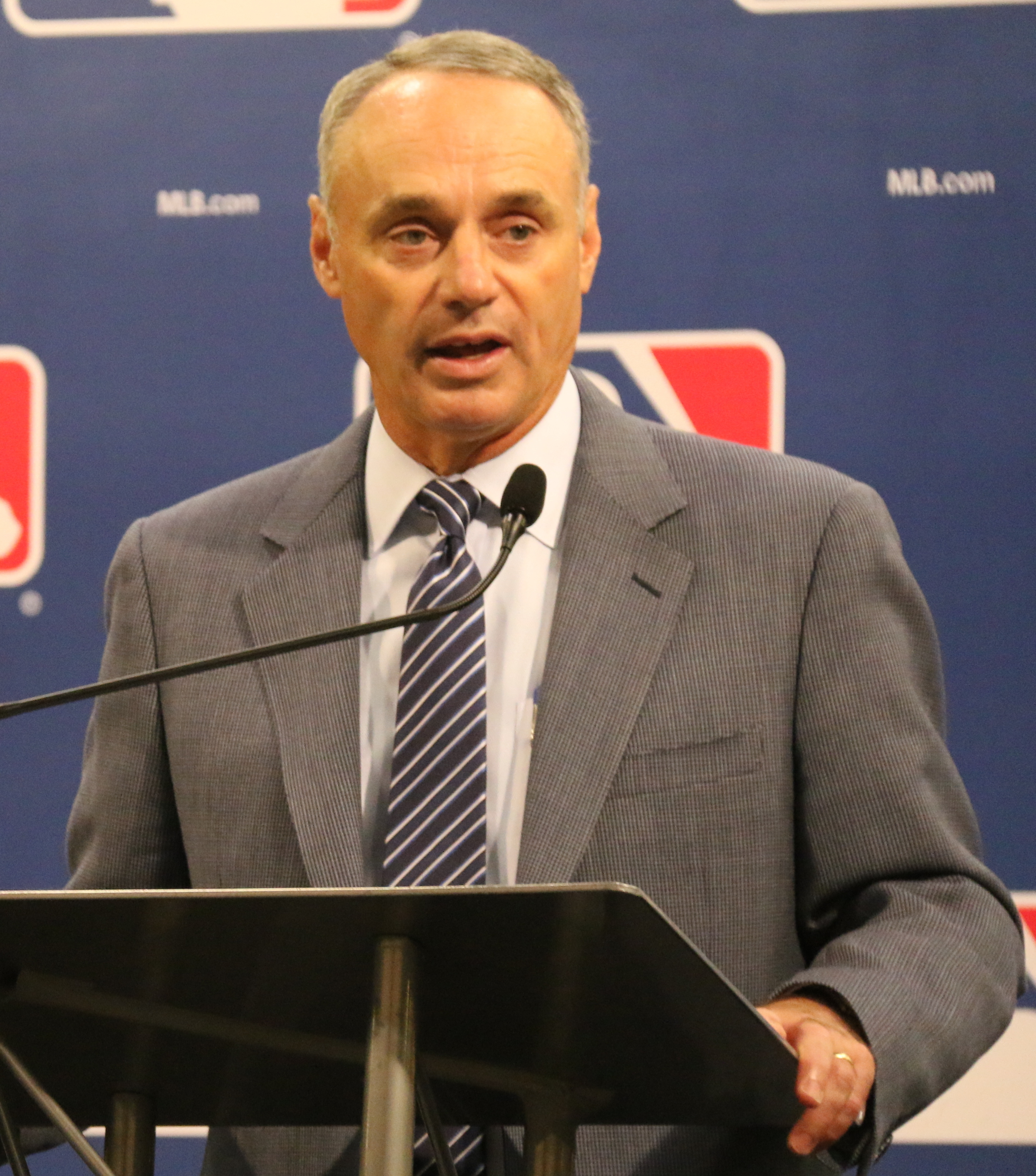
Rob Manfred

In October 2019, Baseball America reported that Major League Baseball had proposed dramatic changes to MiLB that would take effect after expiration of the Professional Baseball Agreement, which governed the MLB–MiLB relationship, at the end of the 2020 season. This included the elimination of many minor league teams.

In mid-November 2019, more than 100 members of the United States Congress signed a letter sent to Commissioner of Baseball Rob Manfred opposing the proposal, noting that it "is not in the best interest of the overall game of baseball" and that it would "devastate our communities, their bond purchasers and other stakeholders affected by the potential loss of these clubs". A response from MLB highlighted that the proposal aims to improve player travel and working conditions.

On November 21, 2019, Minor League Baseball released a statement, asserting that it is "unnecessary and unacceptable to wipe out one-quarter of minor league teams" and characterized the proposal as a way "to improve the profitability of MLB". Manfred rebuked Minor League Baseball for releasing the negotiations to the public and threatened to cut ties with MiLB altogether.

Ultimately the following changes, representing the first significant overhaul of minor league classifications since 1963, were implemented:

- The Major League Baseball draft was moved from mid-June to July to coincide with the MLB All-Star Game, and reduced from 40 rounds to 20.
- The Rookie-level Appalachian League was converted to a collegiate summer baseball league designed for rising freshmen and sophomores.
- The independent American Association, Atlantic League, and Frontier League and formerly Rookie-level Pioneer League became MLB Partner Leagues, with the ability for MLB clubs to acquire players from the Partner Leagues to assign to affiliated clubs.
- The MLB Draft League, a "showcase league" for college players expected to be selected in the annual MLB draft, was formed, with each team in the league playing a 68-game summer season. Four teams from the New York–Penn League (Mahoning Valley Scrappers, State College Spikes, West Virginia Black Bears, and Williamsport Crosscutters), one from the Eastern League (Trenton Thunder), and one from the Carolina League (Frederick Keys) composed the initial league when it debuted in May 2021.
- Three independent league teams—the St. Paul Saints, the Sugar Land Skeeters (renamed the "Sugar Land Space Cowboys" in 2022), and the Somerset Patriots—were brought into MiLB. The Skeeters became the Triple-A affiliate of the Houston Astros, the Saints became the Triple-A affiliate of the Minnesota Twins, and the Patriots became the Double-A affiliate of the New York Yankees.
- The number of MiLB teams, not counting teams in the complex-based Arizona Complex League and Florida Complex League, both of which are directly owned by MLB, was reduced from 160 to 120. Short-Season A and Rookie Advanced leagues were eliminated.
- The New York–Penn League was shut down, leaving seven of its teams without an invitation to join another league.

Affiliate invites for 2021

When MLB teams announced their affiliates for the 2021 season on December 9, 2020, each of the 30 MLB teams had one affiliate at four levels—Triple-A, Double-A, High-A, and Low-A—for a total of 120 affiliated teams. MLB announced new alignments for each division that broadly resembled most of the previous leagues, but assigned them all generic names with their level and a geographic descriptor; ultimately the leagues would play with those designations for only one season until MLB acquired rights to the historic names from the former league offices.

In total, 43 teams lost their MLB affiliations; the Fresno Grizzlies were demoted from Triple-A to Low-A; and the majority of surviving clubs at High-A and Low-A swapped levels, with the former Florida State League and California League dropped down nearly as intact units and the Northwest League and Midwest League promoted with 75% of their teams. The Carolina League dropped to Low-A with seven of its ten teams and added five from the old South Atlantic League in trade; the SAL in turn moved to High-A with half of its previous 12-team roster, filling it out with two Carolina League High-A holdovers, one Midwest League returnee, and three formerly short-season New York-Penn League promotees.

League changes

The following teams lost affiliation during the 2021 realignment:

Team	Previous league	Previous class	New league	Type	Notes
Auburn Doubledays	New York–Penn League	A–Short Season	Perfect Game League	Collegiate	
Batavia Muckdogs	New York–Penn League	A–Short Season	Perfect Game League	Collegiate	
Billings Mustangs	Pioneer League	Rookie Advanced	Pioneer League	Independent	
Bluefield Blue Jays	Appalachian League	Rookie Advanced	Appalachian League	Collegiate	Renamed the Ridge Runners
Boise Hawks	Northwest League	A–Short Season	Pioneer League	Independent	
Bristol Pirates	Appalachian League	Rookie Advanced	Appalachian League	Collegiate	Renamed the State Liners
Burlington Bees	Midwest League	A	Prospect League	Collegiate	
Burlington Royals	Appalachian League	Rookie Advanced	Appalachian League	Collegiate	Renamed the Sock Puppets
Charlotte Stone Crabs	Florida State League	A–Advanced	Folded		
Clinton LumberKings	Midwest League	A	Prospect League	Collegiate	
Danville Braves	Appalachian League	Rookie Advanced	Appalachian League	Collegiate	Renamed the Otterbots
Elizabethton Twins	Appalachian League	Rookie Advanced	Appalachian League	Collegiate	Renamed the River Riders
Florida Fire Frogs	Florida State League	A–Advanced	Folded		
Frederick Keys	Carolina League	A–Advanced	MLB Draft League	Collegiate	Returned to affiliated baseball in 2026, swapping with the Aberdeen IronBirds and joining the High-A South Atlantic League
Grand Junction Rockies	Pioneer League	Rookie Advanced	Pioneer League	Independent	Renamed the Jackalopes
Great Falls Voyagers	Pioneer League	Rookie Advanced	Pioneer League	Independent	
Greeneville Reds	Appalachian League	Rookie Advanced	Appalachian League	Collegiate	Renamed the Flyboys
Hagerstown Suns	South Atlantic League	A	Folded		Replacement team plays in the Atlantic League
Idaho Falls Chukars	Pioneer League	Rookie Advanced	Pioneer League	Independent	
Jackson Generals	Southern League	AA	Folded		Replacement team plays in the Prospect League
Johnson City Cardinals	Appalachian League	Rookie Advanced	Appalachian League	Collegiate	Renamed the Doughboys
Kane County Cougars	Midwest League	A	American Association	Independent	
Kingsport Mets	Appalachian League	Rookie Advanced	Appalachian League	Collegiate	Renamed the Axmen
Lancaster JetHawks	California League	A–Advanced	Folded		
Lexington Legends	South Atlantic League	A	Atlantic League	Independent	
Lowell Spinners	New York–Penn League	A–Short Season	Folded		
Mahoning Valley Scrappers	New York–Penn League	A–Short Season	MLB Draft League	Collegiate	
Missoula PaddleHeads	Pioneer League	Rookie Advanced	Pioneer League	Independent	
Northern Colorado Owlz	Pioneer League	Rookie Advanced	Pioneer League	Independent	Relocated from Orem
Norwich Sea Unicorns	New York–Penn League	A–Short Season	Futures League	Collegiate	
Ogden Raptors	Pioneer League	Rookie Advanced	Pioneer League	Independent	
Princeton Rays	Appalachian League	Rookie Advanced	Appalachian League	Collegiate	Renamed the WhistlePigs. Folded in 2023.
Pulaski Yankees	Appalachian League	Rookie Advanced	Appalachian League	Collegiate	Renamed the River Turtles
Rocky Mountain Vibes	Pioneer League	Rookie Advanced	Pioneer League	Independent	Folded in 2025.
Salem-Keizer Volcanoes	Northwest League	A–Short Season	Mavericks League	Independent	
State College Spikes	New York–Penn League	A–Short Season	MLB Draft League	Collegiate	
Staten Island Yankees	New York–Penn League	A–Short Season	Folded		Replacement team plays in the Atlantic League
Trenton Thunder	Eastern League	AA	MLB Draft League	Collegiate	
Tri-City ValleyCats	New York–Penn League	A–Short Season	Frontier League	Independent	
Vermont Lake Monsters	New York–Penn League	A–Short Season	Futures League	Collegiate	
West Virginia Black Bears	New York–Penn League	A–Short Season	MLB Draft League	Collegiate	
West Virginia Power	South Atlantic League	A	Atlantic League	Independent	Renamed the Charleston Dirty Birds
Williamsport Crosscutters	New York–Penn League	A–Short Season	MLB Draft League	Collegiate	

League realignment

On February 12, 2021, Major League Baseball announced new league alignments for all 120 affiliated Minor League Baseball clubs effective as of the 2021 season. Contrary to previously published reports indicating that realignment would retain the names of the existing minor leagues, Major League Baseball elected to abandon the names of existing minor leagues in favor of a new, class- and region-based naming system.

Triple-A was divided into two leagues:

- Triple-A East, consisting of 20 teams aligned into three divisions (Midwest, Northeast, and Southeast).
- Triple-A West, consisting of 10 teams aligned into two divisions (East and West).

Double-A was divided into three leagues:

- Double-A Central, consisting of 10 teams aligned into two divisions (North and South).
- Double-A Northeast, consisting of 12 teams aligned into two divisions (Northeast and Southeast)
- Double-A South, consisting of eight teams aligned into two divisions (North and South).

High-A (formerly Class A-Advanced) was divided into three leagues:

- High-A Central, consisting of 12 teams aligned into two divisions (East and West).
- High-A East, consisting of 12 teams aligned into two divisions (North and South).
- High-A West, consisting of six teams without divisional alignment.

Low-A (formerly Class A) was divided into three leagues:

- Low-A East, consisting of 12 teams aligned into three divisions (Central, North, and South).
- Low-A Southeast, consisting of 10 teams aligned into two divisions (East and West).
- Low-A West, consisting of eight teams aligned into two divisions (North and South).

The US-based Rookie-level leagues were renamed prior to starting play in late June; the former Gulf Coast League was renamed as the Florida Complex League and the former Arizona League was renamed as the Arizona Complex League.

On March 16, 2022, Minor League Baseball announced that the historic league names were acquired by MLB. The region-based names were scrapped and the previous league names given to the new leagues that most closely resembled the old leagues.

- Triple-A East became the International League
- Triple-A West became the Pacific Coast League
- Double-A Central became the Texas League
- Double-A Northeast became the Eastern League
- Double-A South became the Southern League
- High-A Central became the Midwest League
- High-A East became the South Atlantic League
- High-A West became the Northwest League
- Low-A East became the Carolina League
- Low-A Southeast became the Florida State League
- Low-A West became the California League

The Low-A classification was also renamed Single-A. Additionally, the International League was reorganized from three divisions to two: East and West.

== Organization ==
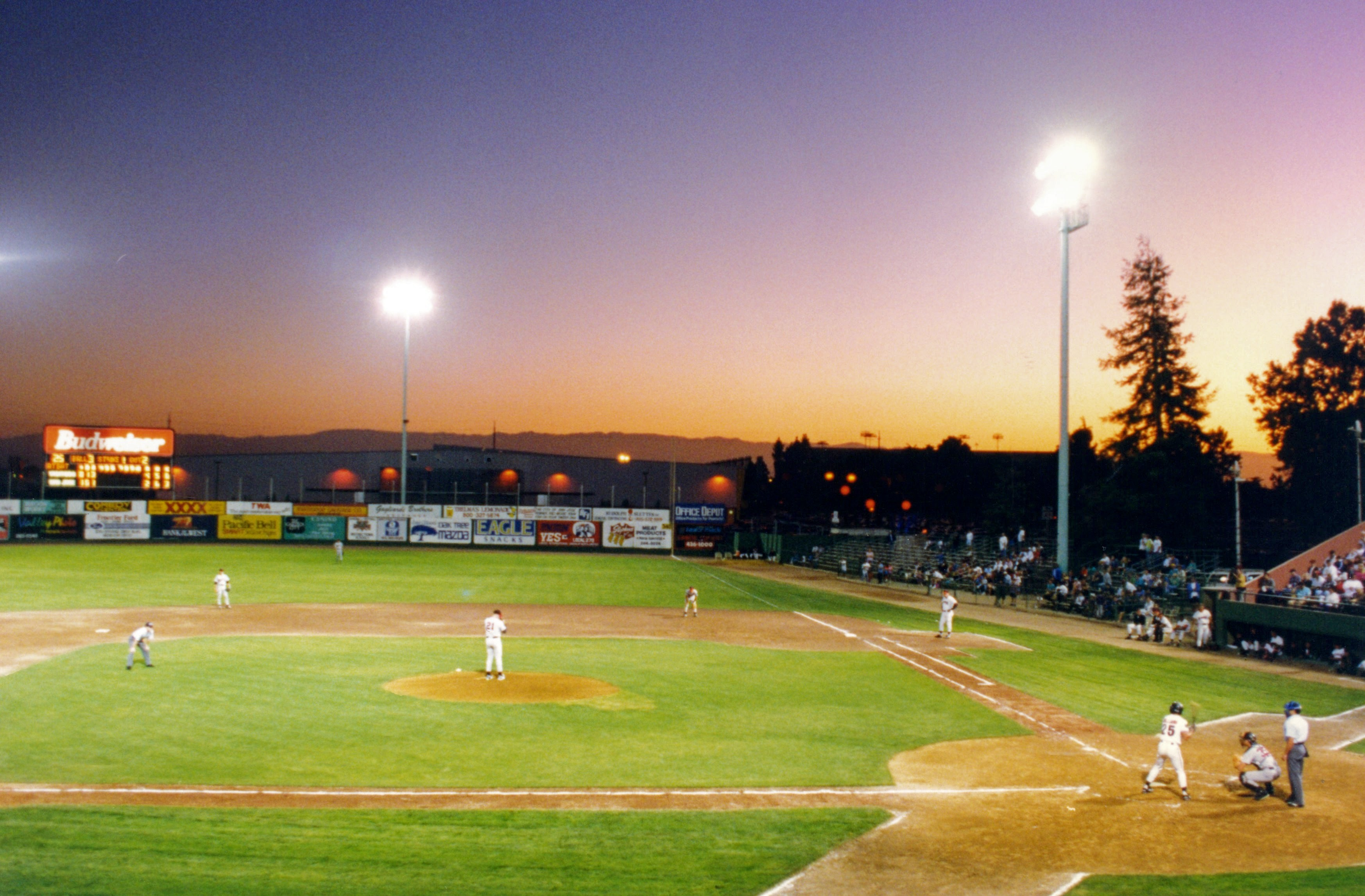
A Class A-Advanced California League game in San Jose, California, in 1994

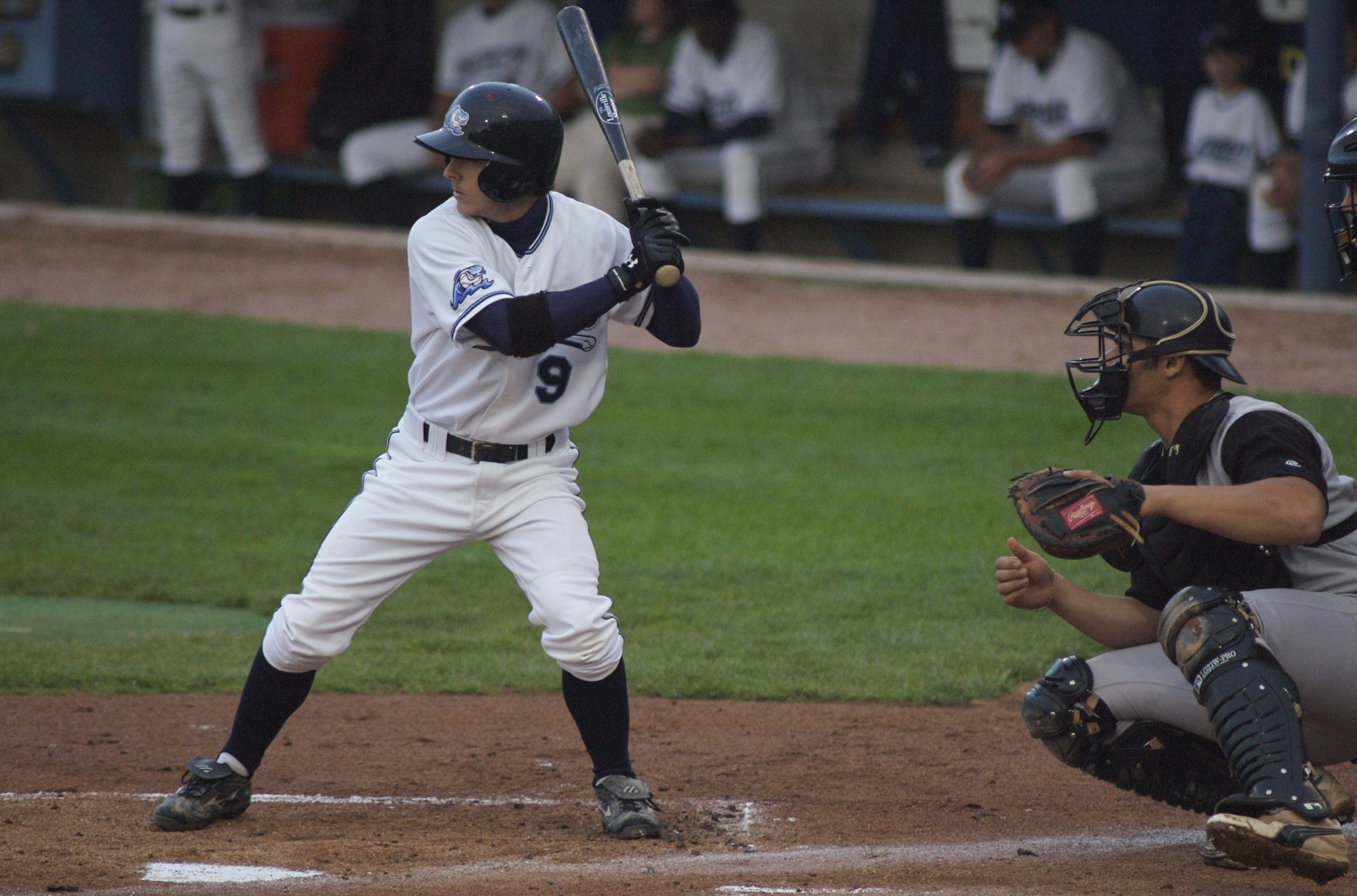
Will Rhymes bats during a Class A game between the West Michigan Whitecaps and Kane County Cougars in September 2006

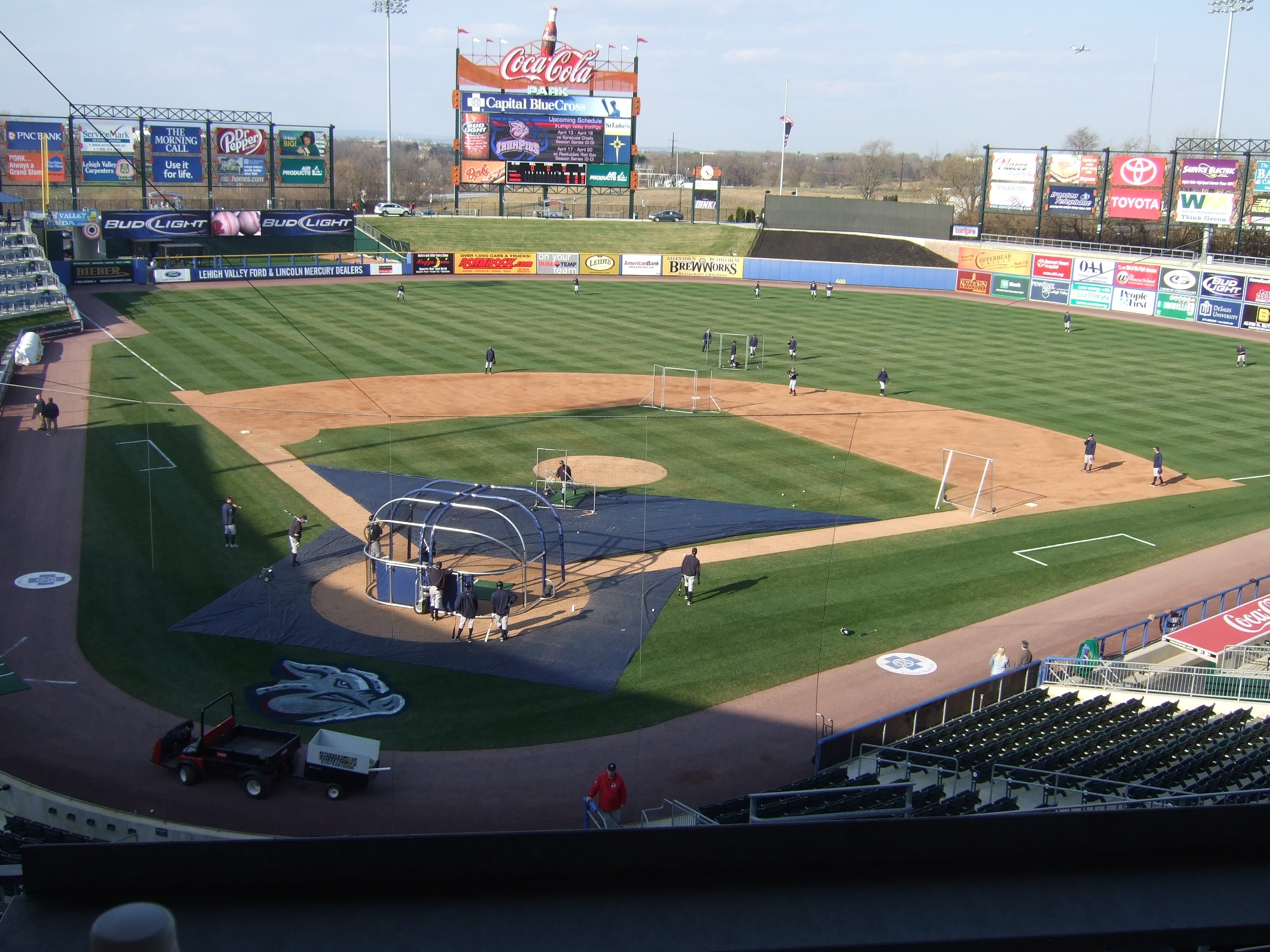
Coca-Cola Park in Allentown, Pennsylvania, home of the Lehigh Valley IronPigs, the Triple-A affiliate of the Philadelphia Phillies, in April 2009

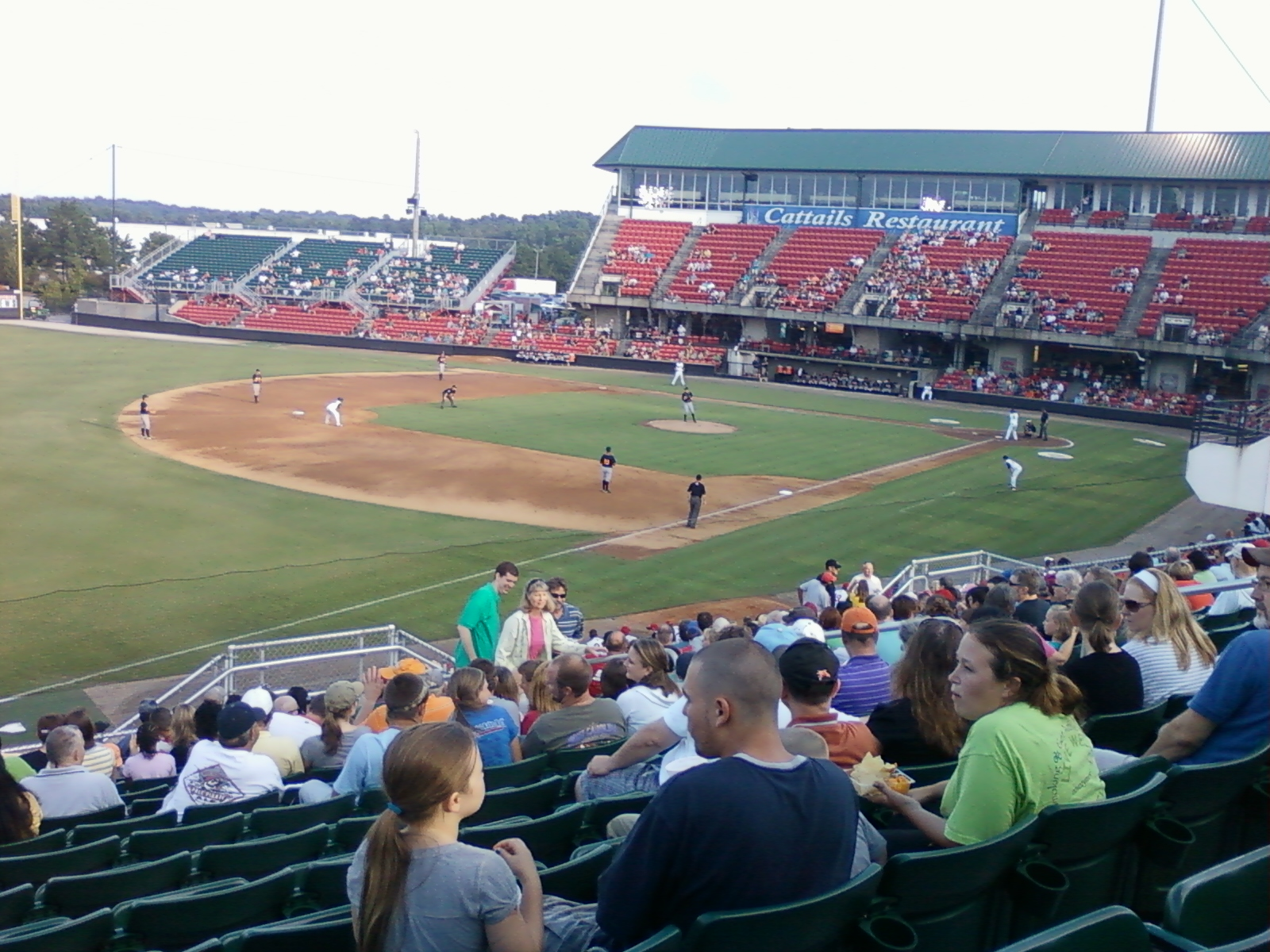
A 2011 Double-A game between the Montgomery Biscuits and Carolina Mudcats at Five County Stadium in Zebulon, North Carolina in August 2011

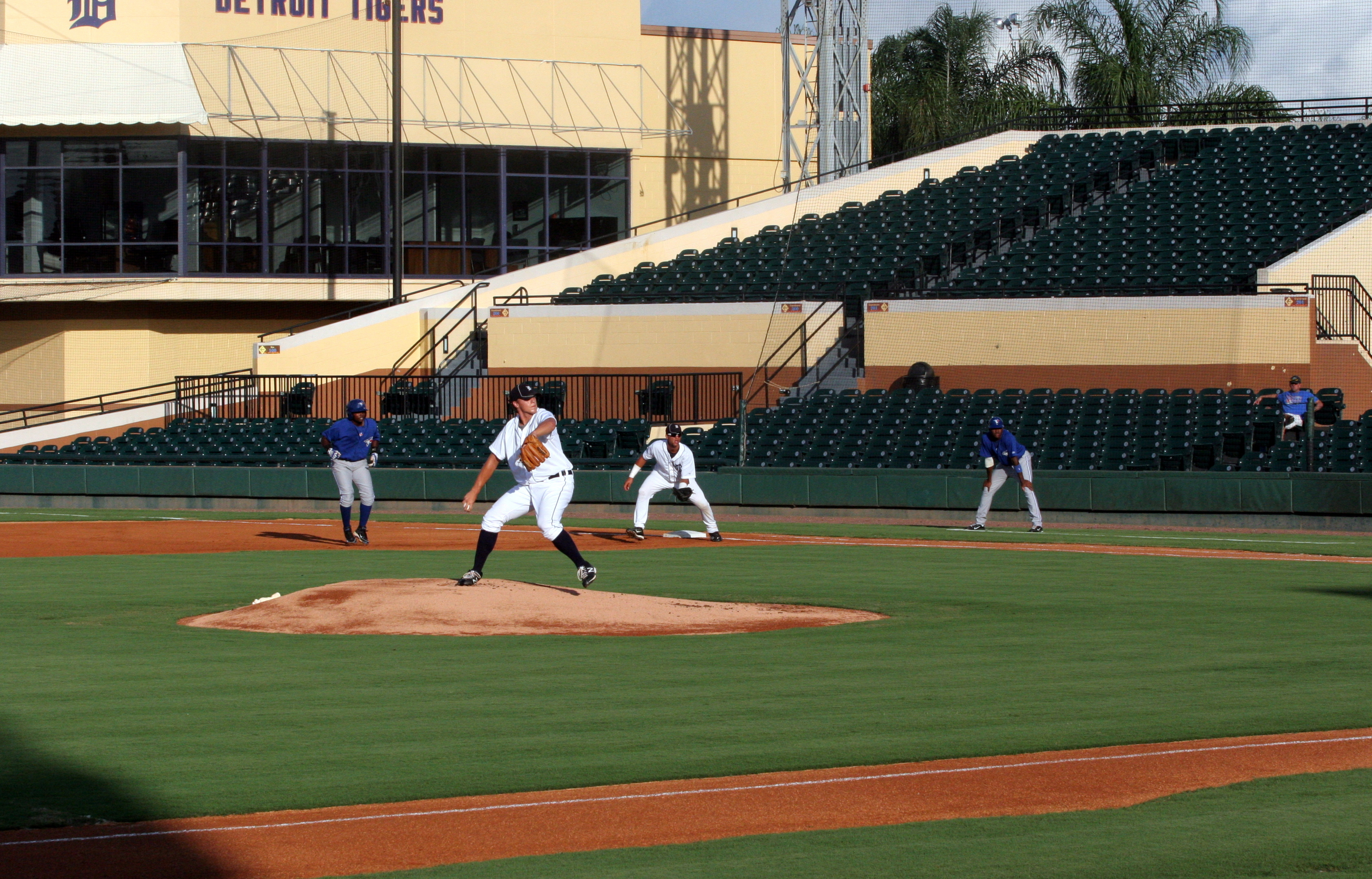
Jake Thompson pitches for the GCL Tigers against the GCL Blue Jays in September 2012

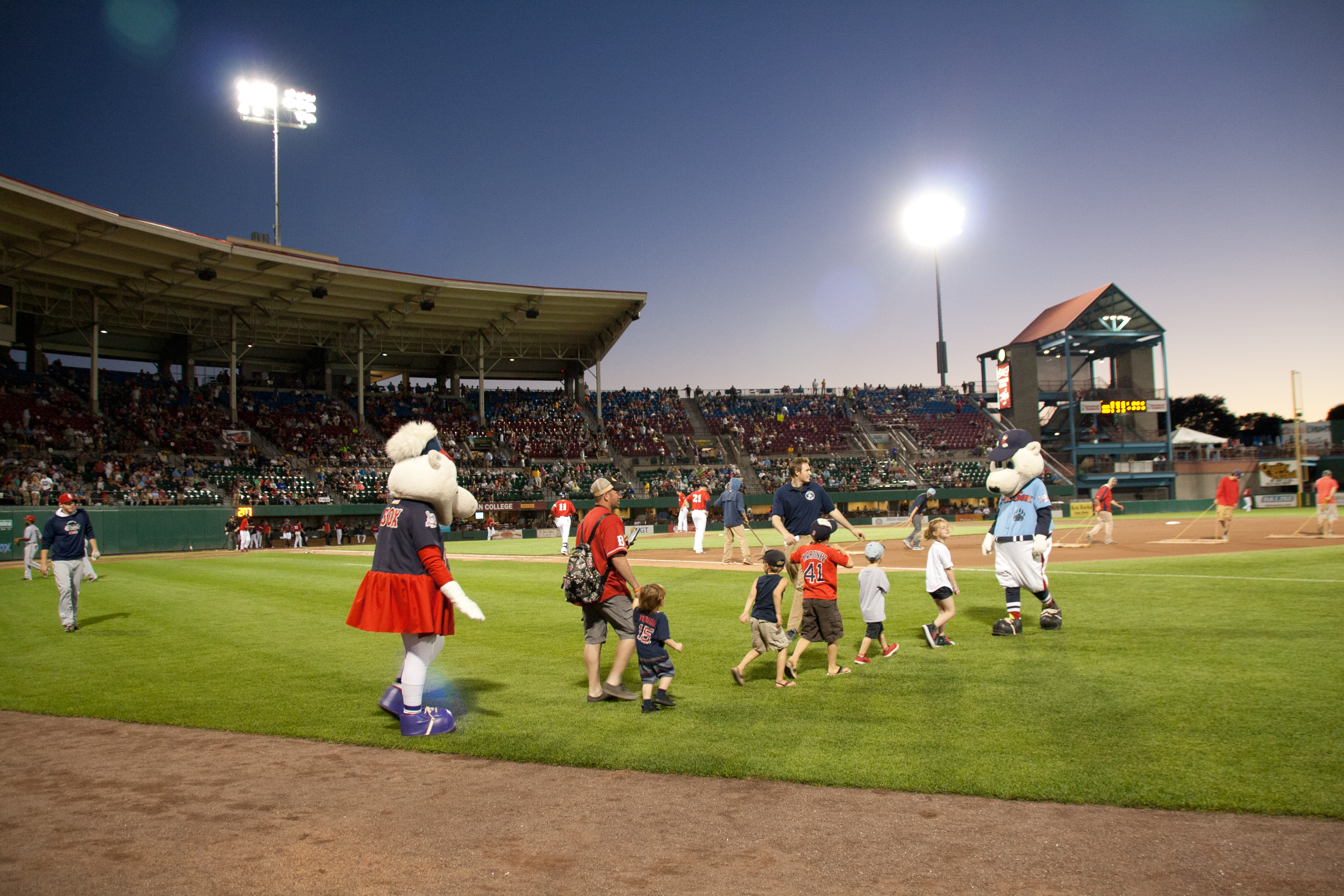
Minor League mascots at a Pawtucket Red Sox Triple-A game in Pawtucket, Rhode Island in August 2016

As of the 2022 season, the minor league system is divided into four classes: Triple-A (AAA), Double-A (AA), High-A (A+), and Single-A (A). (Note: Sites such as Baseball-Reference.com use the AAA, AA, A+, and A abbreviations in player records; A− is used for the now defunct Class A Short Season. A+ and A− are written abbreviations only; the levels are not called "A-plus" or "A-minus".) Major League Baseball franchises may also maintain one or two complex-based rookie teams in the Arizona Complex League or Florida Complex League, and international summer baseball teams in the Dominican Summer League. While major league teams play a 162-game schedule, minor league seasons are shorter. As of 2022, a complete season in Triple-A is 150 games, Double-A is 138 games, and High-A and Single-A are each 132 games. In addition to the below organized leagues, the off-season Arizona Fall League has six teams that play approximately 30 games apiece in autumn, with rosters comprising the top prospects associated with each of the six MLB divisions.

=== Triple-A ===
This classification currently includes two affiliated leagues: the 20-team International League and the 10-team Pacific Coast League, known as Triple-A East and Triple-A West, respectively, for the 2021 season. For most of the 20th century, Triple-A also included the American Association, based in the Midwest, but that league disbanded with its clubs absorbed by the other two leagues, as part of a reorganization of the Triple-A level in 1997. The International League features teams from the Atlantic coast and midwestern U.S., while the Pacific Coast League features teams from the Pacific coast and the southwest.

Both young players and veterans play for Triple-A teams. Parent clubs often hold players who are on the 40-man roster, but not on the active MLB roster, at the Triple-A level. Such players are eligible to be added to a team's active major league roster. For teams in contention for a playoff spot late in a season, it gives them fresh players, while for teams not in contention, it gives them an opportunity to evaluate their second-tier players against major league competition. Some Triple-A players are "career minor leaguers", former prospects whose skill growth has halted and who are not likely to advance to MLB, unless as a temporary replacement.

=== Double-A ===
There are currently three leagues in this classification: the 12-team Eastern League, known as Double-A Northeast for the 2021 season, with teams in the Northeast and Mid-Atlantic regions of the U.S., the eight-team Southern League (known as Double-A South for the 2021 season) with teams in the Deep South, and the 10-team Texas League (known as Double-A Central for the 2021 season) with teams in the Southwest and Great Plains.

Some players jump to the majors from this level, as many of the top prospects are put here to play against each other rather than against minor and major league veterans in Triple-A. A small handful of players might be placed here to start, usually veterans from foreign leagues with more experience in professional baseball. The expectation is usually that these veteran players will be in the majors by the end of the season, as their salaries tend to be higher than those of most prospects.

=== High-A ===
One level below Double-A is the High-A level, named "Class A-Advanced" before 2021. This classification has three leagues: the 12-team Midwest League, known as High-A Central for the 2021 season, covering the Midwest, the six-team Northwest League, known as High-A West for the 2021 season, with teams in the Pacific Northwest, and the 12-team South Atlantic League, known as High-A East for the 2021 season, with teams in the eastern states. All three leagues were reclassified prior to the 2021 season, with the Midwest League and the South Atlantic League promoted from Single-A and the Northwest League promoted from Class A Short Season.

This level of play is often a second or third promotion for a minor league player, although some high first-round draftees, particularly those with experience playing college baseball, begin at this level.

=== Single-A ===
Below the High-A level is Single-A, named "Class A" before 2021, when it was also known as Single-A or Full-Season A, (Note: "Full-Season A" and "Short-Season A" were used to clearly differentiate Class A from Class A Short Season.) and "Low-A" for the 2021 season. This classification has three leagues: the 8-team California League, known as Low-A West for the 2021 season, located entirely in California, the 12-team Carolina League, known as Low-A East for the 2021 season, and the 10-team Florida State League, known as Low-A Southeast for the 2021 season. All three leagues were demoted from High-A to Single-A effective with the 2021 season.

These leagues are a mix of players moving up from Rookie leagues, as well as the occasional experienced first-year player. Most of the teams in the Florida State League are owned by major league parent clubs and use their spring training complexes.

In 2022, the official name of the class became Single-A.

=== Rookie ===
Minor leagues with the Rookie classification play a shortened season that traditionally began in mid-June and ended in late August or early September. This lowest level of minor league baseball consists of two US-based leagues, the Arizona Complex League and Florida Complex League, known as the Arizona League and Gulf Coast League, respectively, before 2021, and one Caribbean-based league, the Dominican Summer League.

The U.S.-based Rookie leagues play a schedule of approximately 60 games and are named "complex leagues" because games are played at their parent clubs' spring training complexes. Rosters consist primarily of newly drafted players who are not yet ready for a higher level of play. These leagues are intended almost exclusively to allow players to hone their skills; no admission is charged and no concessions are sold.

As of the 2024 season, the Arizona Complex League and Florida Complex League seasons commence in early May and conclude in late July in order to provide players with previous experience in the Dominican Summer League with a full season in stateside professional baseball without having to compete for playing time with newly drafted players selected in the July Major League Baseball draft. This adjusted schedule also allows the top Rookie-level prospects in each organization to be promoted to class Single-A for the final two months of the professional baseball season upon the conclusion of the complex league seasons.

=== Roster sizes and player restrictions ===
As of the 2024 season, each major league club may have no more than 165 players assigned to the rosters of their domestic affiliates (i.e., Triple-A, Double-A, High-A, Single-A, and complex-league Rookie)—excluding international players assigned to the Dominican Summer League who have not yet been assigned to a domestic affiliate, as well as players placed on the minor league 60-day and full-season injured lists and players on each club's major league 40-man roster who are on optional assignment with a club's minor league affiliates—during the minor league season, with a limit of 175 domestic players during the offseason. During the minor league season, the following roster limits for each classification are used:

Rosters sizes in Minor League Baseball
Level	Active roster size	Player restrictions
Triple-A	28 players	No restrictions
Double-A	28 players	No restrictions
High-A	30 players	No more than 2 players and 1 player-coach with 6 or more years of minor-league experience
Single-A	30 players	No more than 2 players with 5 or more years of minor-league experience
U.S.-based Rookie	No limit	No more than 3 players with 4 or more years of minor-league experience
International Rookie	35 players	No players with 4 or more years of minor-league experience

== Leagues and affiliations ==
=== Minor leagues ===
Triple-A

- International League
- Pacific Coast League

Double-A

- Eastern League
- Southern League
- Texas League

High-A

- Midwest League
- Northwest League
- South Atlantic League

Single-A

- California League
- Carolina League
- Florida State League

Rookie

- Arizona Complex League
- Florida Complex League
- Dominican Summer League

Off-season leagues

- Arizona Fall League

Showcase league

- MLB Draft League

Partner leagues

- American Association
- Atlantic League
- Frontier League
- Pioneer League

=== Major League affiliations ===
Table key
Triple-A		Double-A		High-A		Single-A	
IL	International League	EL	Eastern League	MWL	Midwest League	CAL	California League
PCL	Pacific Coast League	SL	Southern League	NWL	Northwest League	CAR	Carolina League
—		TL	Texas League	SAL	South Atlantic League	FSL	Florida State League

Affiliations of Minor League teams with Major League teams
League	Division	MLB Team	Triple-A	Double-A	High-A	Single-A
American League	East	Baltimore Orioles	Norfolk Tides^{IL}	Chesapeake Baysox^{EL}	Frederick Keys^{SAL}	Delmarva Shorebirds^{CAR}
American League	East	Boston Red Sox	Worcester Red Sox^{IL}	Portland Sea Dogs^{EL}	Greenville Drive^{SAL}	Salem RidgeYaks^{CAR}
American League	East	New York Yankees	Scranton/Wilkes-Barre Highlanders^{IL}	Somerset Patriots^{EL}	Hudson Valley Renegades^{SAL}	Tampa Tarpons^{FSL}
American League	East	Tampa Bay Rays	Durham Bulls^{IL}	Montgomery Biscuits^{SL}	Bowling Green Hot Rods^{SAL}	Charleston RiverDogs^{CAR}
American League	East	Toronto Blue Jays	Buffalo Bisons^{IL}	New Hampshire Fisher Cats^{EL}	Vancouver Canadians^{NWL}	Dunedin Blue Jays^{FSL}
American League	Central	Chicago White Sox	Charlotte Knights^{IL}	Birmingham Barons^{SL}	Winston-Salem Dash^{SAL}	Kannapolis Cannon Ballers^{CAR}
American League	Central	Cleveland Guardians	Columbus Clippers^{IL}	Akron RubberDucks^{EL}	Lake County Captains^{MWL}	Hill City Howlers^{CAR}
American League	Central	Detroit Tigers	Toledo Mud Hens^{IL}	Erie SeaWolves^{EL}	West Michigan Whitecaps^{MWL}	Lakeland Flying Tigers^{FSL}
American League	Central	Kansas City Royals	Omaha Storm Chasers^{IL}	Northwest Arkansas Naturals^{TL}	Quad Cities River Bandits^{MWL}	Columbia Fireflies^{CAR}
American League	Central	Minnesota Twins	St. Paul Saints^{IL}	Wichita Turbo Tubs^{TL}	Cedar Rapids Kernels^{MWL}	Fort Myers Mighty Mussels^{FSL}
American League	West	Athletics	Las Vegas Aviators^{PCL}	Midland RockHounds^{TL}	Lansing Lugnuts^{MWL}	Stockton Ports^{CAL}
American League	West	Houston Astros	Sugar Land Space Cowboys^{PCL}	Corpus Christi Hooks^{TL}	Asheville Tourists^{SAL}	Fayetteville Woodpeckers^{CAR}
American League	West	Los Angeles Angels	Salt Lake Bees^{PCL}	Rocket City Trash Pandas^{SL}	Tri-City Dust Devils^{NWL}	Rancho Cucamonga Quakes^{CAL}
American League	West	Seattle Mariners	Tacoma Rainiers^{PCL}	Arkansas Travelers^{TL}	Everett AquaSox^{NWL}	Inland Empire 66ers^{CAL}
American League	West	Texas Rangers	Round Rock Express^{PCL}	Frisco RoughRiders^{TL}	Hub City Spartanburgers^{SAL}	Hickory Crawdads^{CAR}
National League	East	Atlanta Braves	Gwinnett Stripers^{IL}	Columbus Clingstones^{SL}	Rome Emperors^{SAL}	Augusta GreenJackets^{CAR}
National League	East	Miami Marlins	Jacksonville Jumbo Shrimp^{IL}	Pensacola Blue Wahoos^{SL}	Beloit Sky Carp^{MWL}	Jupiter Hammerheads^{FSL}
National League	East	New York Mets	Syracuse Mets^{IL}	Binghamton Rumble Ponies^{EL}	Brooklyn Cyclones^{SAL}	St. Lucie Mets^{FSL}
National League	East	Philadelphia Phillies	Lehigh Valley IronPigs^{IL}	Reading Fightin Phils^{EL}	Jersey Shore BlueClaws^{SAL}	Clearwater Threshers^{FSL}
National League	East	Washington Nationals	Rochester Red Wings^{IL}	Harrisburg Senators^{EL}	Wilmington Blue Rocks^{SAL}	Fredericksburg Nationals^{CAR}
National League	Central	Chicago Cubs	Iowa Cubs^{IL}	Knoxville Smokies^{SL}	South Bend Cubs^{MWL}	Myrtle Beach Pelicans^{CAR}
National League	Central	Cincinnati Reds	Louisville Bats^{IL}	Chattanooga Lookouts^{SL}	Dayton Dragons^{MWL}	Daytona Tortugas^{FSL}
National League	Central	Milwaukee Brewers	Nashville Sounds^{IL}	Biloxi Shuckers^{SL}	Wisconsin Timber Rattlers^{MWL}	Wilson Warbirds^{CAR}
National League	Central	Pittsburgh Pirates	Indianapolis Indians^{IL}	Altoona Curve^{EL}	Greensboro Grasshoppers^{SAL}	Bradenton Marauders^{FSL}
National League	Central	St. Louis Cardinals	Memphis Redbirds^{IL}	Ozarks Springbirds^{TL}	Peoria Chiefs^{MWL}	Palm Beach Cardinals^{FSL}
National League	West	Arizona Diamondbacks	Reno Aces^{PCL}	Amarillo Sod Poodles^{TL}	Hillsboro Hops^{NWL}	Visalia Rawhide^{CAL}
National League	West	Colorado Rockies	Albuquerque Isotopes^{PCL}	Hartford Yard Goats^{EL}	Spokane Indians^{NWL}	Fresno Grizzlies^{CAL}
National League	West	Los Angeles Dodgers	Oklahoma City Comets^{PCL}	Tulsa Drillers^{TL}	Great Lakes Loons^{MWL}	Ontario Tower Buzzers^{CAL}
National League	West	San Diego Padres	El Paso Chihuahuas^{PCL}	San Antonio Missions^{TL}	Fort Wayne TinCaps^{MWL}	Lake Elsinore Storm^{CAL}
National League	West	San Francisco Giants	Sacramento River Cats^{PCL}	Richmond Flying Squirrels^{EL}	Eugene Emeralds^{NWL}	San Jose Giants^{CAL}

=== Map ===
Current team locations:
- International League
- Pacific Coast League
- Eastern League
- Southern League
- Texas League
- Midwest League
- Northwest League
- South Atlantic League
- California League
- Carolina League
- Florida State League

=== Classification hierarchy ===
The following classifications, listed from highest to lowest, have existed since the National Association of Professional Baseball Leagues (the formal name of Minor League Baseball) was established prior to the 1902 season. Only seasons where a change was made to the hierarchy are listed; class introductions after 1902 appear in bold font, while class eliminations appear in italics. Not all defined classifications were used each season.

1902	1912	1936	1937	1946	1952	1958	1963	1965	1990	1991	2021
A; B; C; D	**AA**; A; B; C; D	AA; **A1**; A; B; C; D	AA; A1; A; B; C; D; **E**	**AAA**; AA; A; B; C; D	**Open**; AAA; AA; A; B; C; D	AAA; AA; A; B; C; D	AAA; AA; A; **Rk**	AAA; AA; A; **A (Short)**; Rk	AAA; AA; **A-Adv**; A; A (Short); Rk	AAA; AA; A-Adv; A; A (Short); **Rk-Adv**; Rk	AAA; AA; High-A; A; Rk
				A1; E		Open	B; C; D				A (Short); Rk-Adv

Notes:

- High-A was formerly Class A-Advanced (A-Adv) before 2021
- Class A was officially known as Low-A during the 2021 season
- A (Short) denotes Class A Short Season
- Rk-Adv denotes Rookie Advanced
- Rk denotes Rookie

== Players ==
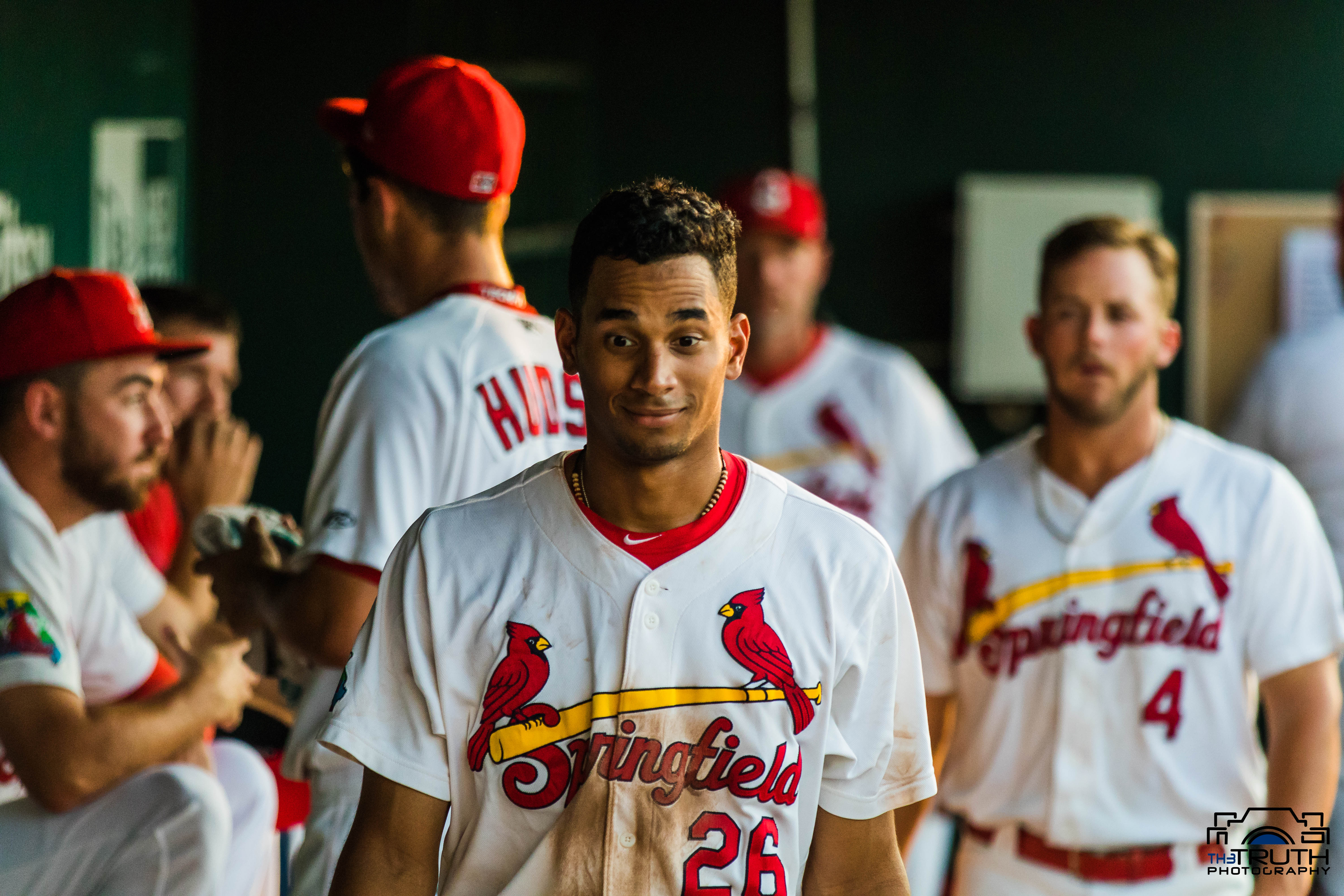
Players of the Double-A Springfield Cardinals in July 2017

Major league clubs may only use players who are on the team's major league active roster in games; players on the active roster are selected from a 40-man major league reserve list (often called the 40-man roster). Effective with the 2020 Major League Baseball season, the active roster size for each team is 26 players for regular games and 27 players for scheduled doubleheaders, with the roster size expanding to 28 players from September 1 through the end of the regular season. Prior to the 2020 season, the active roster size from the start of the regular season until September 1 was 25 players, with a 26th player allowed for a scheduled doubleheader. From September 1 to the end of the regular season, teams were allowed to expand their active rosters up to 40 players, the size of the major league reserve list.

Players on the 40-man reserve list who are not on the team's active roster are generally either on the injured list or playing at some level of the minor leagues (usually at the Triple-A or Double-A level). Prior to 2022, players on the 40-man reserve list were the only minor league players eligible for union membership in the Major League Baseball Players Association (MLBPA) and the remaining minor leaguers did not have union representation; in September 2022, following a majority of minor league players expressing support for unionization, joined the MLBPA.

A major league team's director of player development determines where a given player will be placed in the farm system, in coordination with the coaches and managers who evaluate their talent. At the end of spring training, players both from the spring major league camp and minor league winter camp are placed by the major league club on the roster of a minor league team. The director of player development and the general manager usually determine the initial assignments for new draftees, who typically begin playing professionally in June after they have been signed to contracts. The farm system is ever-changing, and the evaluation of players is a constantly ongoing process. The director of player development and his managers meet or teleconference regularly to discuss how players are performing at each level. Personal development, injuries, and high levels of achievement by players in the classes below all steer a player's movement up and down in the class system.

Players will play for the team to which they are assigned for the duration of that season unless they are "called up" (promoted to a higher level), "sent down" (demoted to a lower-class team in the major league club's farm system), or released from the farm system entirely. A release from minor-league level used to spell the end of a minor league player's career. In more modern times, released players often sign with independent baseball clubs, which are scouted heavily by major league organizations. Many players get a second or third look from the major league scouts if they improve in the independent leagues.

=== Salaries and compensation ===
Although not playing at the major league level, minor league players are professional athletes. Generally, the parent major league club pays the salaries and benefits of uniformed personnel (players and coaches) and provides bats and balls, while the minor league club pays for in-season travel and other operational expenses.

Minor league salaries vary based on class level and contract type. Minor league players with major league experience or on an MLB team's 40-man roster at work on the lower end of major league pay scales but are covered by all rules and player agreements of the MLB collective bargaining agreement, regardless of the level they are assigned to. Minor league players not on the 40-man reserve list are under contract to their respective parent MLB clubs; they generally work for far less pay as they develop their skills and work their way up the ladder toward the major leagues. Many players have signing bonuses and other additional compensation that can run into the millions of dollars, although that is generally reserved for early-round draft picks. Prior to 2022, the majority of MiLB players made less than $10,000 per season. After renegotiation and unionization of MiLB players, minor leaguers received large increases in salaries and benefits.

Player compensation (in $USD) in Minor League Baseball, as of 2024
Level	Minimum annual salary	Minimum annual salary if on 40-man roster	Minimum annual salary with MLB experience
Triple-A	$35,800	$60,300	$120,600
Double-A	$30,250	$60,300	$120,600
High-A	$27,300	$60,300	$120,600
Single-A	$26,200	$60,300	$120,600
US-based Rookie	$19,800	$60,300	$120,600
Arizona Fall League	$6,000	$60,300	$120,600
Foreign-based Rookie	$3,000	$60,300	$120,600

=== Rehabilitation assignments ===
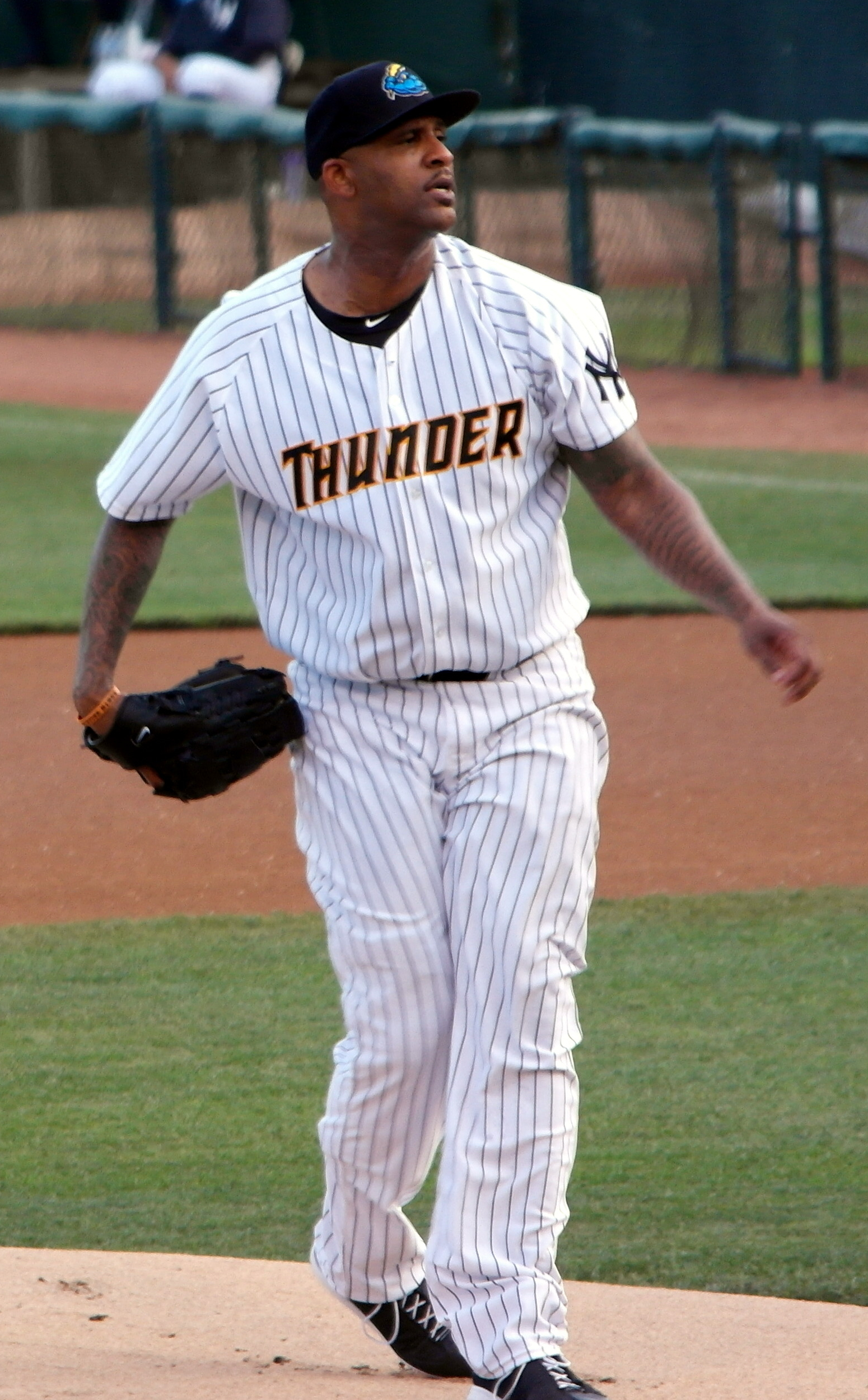
C C Sabathia of the New York Yankees with the Trenton Thunder in July 2014

Rehabilitating with Minor League teams is a standard way for injured Major League players to get back into playing shape.

Players on the injured list (IL) can be sent to the minor leagues to aid in rehabilitation following an injury, typically for one or two weeks. Players are often sent to minor league clubs based on geography and facilities, not necessarily by class for these reassignments.

Rehabbing major leaguers continue to receive Major League pay and generally enjoy better amenities than their minor league teammates.

Former Minnesota Twins star Joe Mauer, who missed most of the first two months of the 2011 season due to a difficult recovery from arthroscopic knee surgery after the 2010 season, reported to Minnesota's Class A-Advanced Florida State League team, the Fort Myers Miracle, which is based in their spring training facility in Fort Myers. The Miracle manager at the time was Mauer's older brother Jake.

Mike Trout's first rehab assignment of his career, in July 2017, was with the Inland Empire 66ers of San Bernardino, California, the Class A-Advanced affiliate of the Los Angeles Angels. This allowed Trout to stay closer to the Angels compared to the team's Triple-A affiliate, the Salt Lake Bees.

== Umpires ==
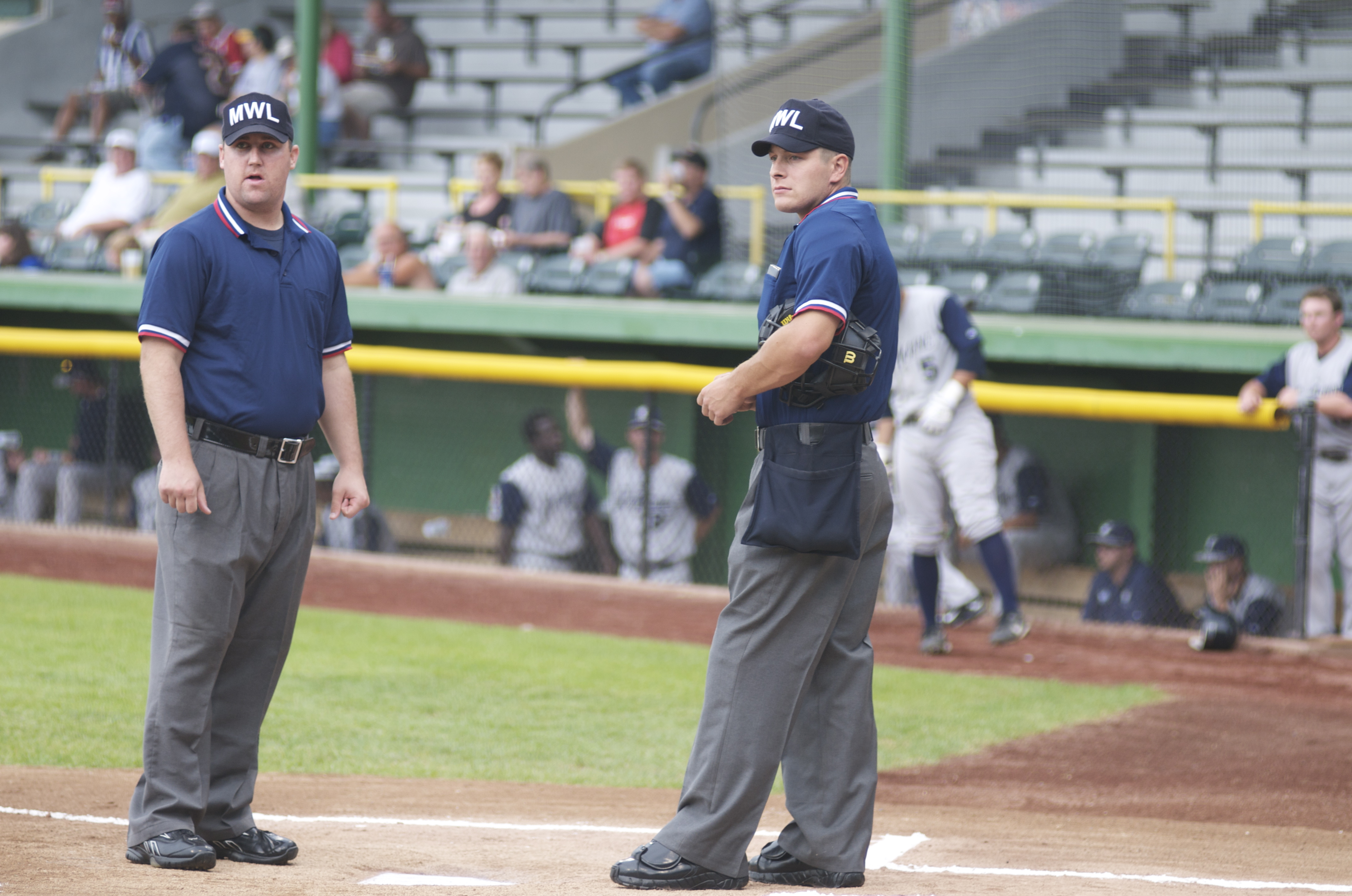
Ryan Blakney (left) and Ben May umpiring in the Midwest League in 2008

Umpires at the minor league level are overseen by Minor League Baseball Umpire Development (MiLBUD), which is responsible for the training, evaluation, and recommendation for promotion and retention or release of the umpires.

The umpires are evaluated eight times a season by the staff of MiLBUD and receive a ranking at mid-season and the end of each year. Based on performance during the year, an umpire may advance in classification when a position opens in-season or during the off-season. MiLBUD holds an annual Rookie Evaluation Course every year in March to evaluate rookie umpires. Participants are normally the best students from the two professional umpire schools (one owned and operated by the same entity). The top students who pass the evaluation course are recommended for the first openings in lower-level leagues.

Any student who wants to work as an umpire must attend a professional umpire training school. MiLB recognizes two schools for training prospective professional umpires, the Harry Wendelstedt Umpire School and Minor League Baseball Umpire Training Academy, both located in Florida. The Umpire Training Academy is owned and operated by MiLBUD, while the Wendelstedt Umpire School is independently owned by MLB umpire Hunter Wendelstedt. The classes for each school are held for five weeks in January and February. The instructors at these schools are former or present major or minor league umpires. Simply attending one of these schools, however, does not guarantee that the candidate will be recommended to the evaluation course or for openings in lower-level leagues. Generally, less than 20% of students move on to the Rookie Evaluation Course.

Before a development program was created, minor league presidents would recruit directly from umpire schools. Umpires were then "sold" from league to league by word of mouth through the various league presidents. The umpire development program first started in 1964, when it was decided that a method of recruitment, training, and development for umpires of both major and minor leagues was needed. The program was founded at baseball's 1964 Winter Meetings in Houston, and it began operating the next year. The program aimed to recruit more athletic, energetic, and dedicated individuals who would also have high morals and integrity standards. In 1968, it was decided that the program needed its own umpire training course, which would be held annually. The first "Umpire Specialization Course" was held in St. Petersburg, Florida, the following year.

Minor league umpires have been unionized since 1999, when they formed the Association of Minor League Umpires (AMLU), which has been a guild within the Office and Professional Employees International Union (OPEIU) since 2010. A strike action occurred at the start of the 2006 season, spurred by a disagreement over salaries and resulting in the use of replacement umpires until an agreement was reached after two months.

Presently, the candidates for a job in professional umpiring must meet several requirements in order to be considered. An applicant must have a high school diploma or a G.E.D., must be athletic, and also must have 20/20 vision, although they are permitted to wear glasses or contact lenses. They must also have good communication skills, good reflexes and coordination, and must have trained at one of the two professional umpire schools.

== Ownership ==
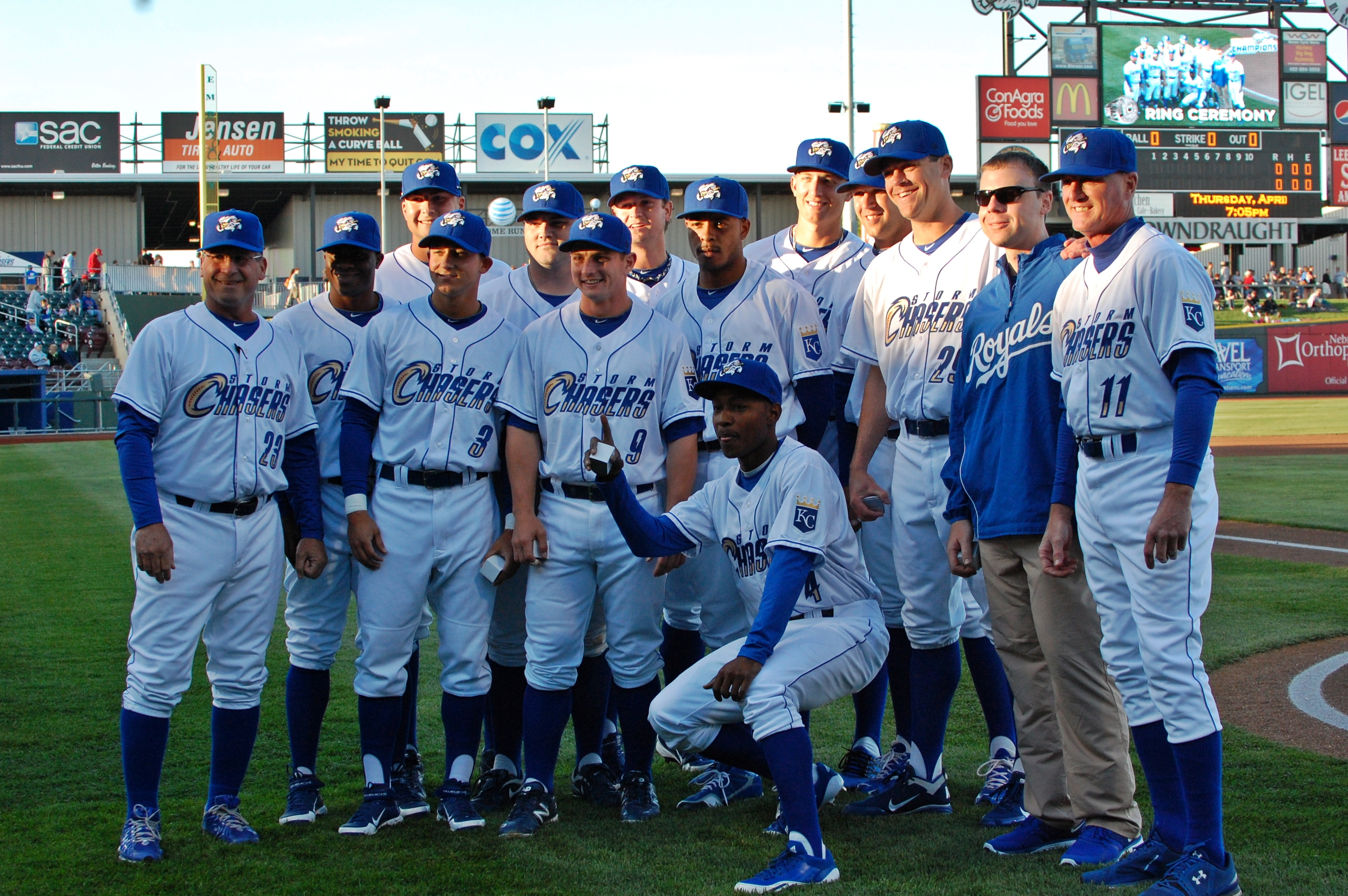
The 2011 Omaha Storm Chasers, the Pacific Coast League champions

Teams in the affiliated minor leagues are generally independently owned and operated, and are directly affiliated with one major league team. Affiliations are governed by standardized agreements; historically known as a Player Development Contract (PDC), as of 2021 the term Player Development License Agreement (PDL) is used. Some minor league teams are directly owned by their major league parent club. As of December 2025, 48 of the 120 are owned and operated by a single company, Diamond Baseball Holdings, which was established in 2021. MLB does not allow one organization to own more than 50 MiLB teams and no more than 14 at any level; Diamond Baseball Holdings is the only owner with 10 or more teams.

With the reorganization of 2021, the standard length of an affiliation agreement is 10 years. Previously, affiliations were for only two or four years, with affiliation changes being fairly frequent, though many relationships have been renewed and endure for extended time periods. For example, the Omaha Storm Chasers (formerly the Omaha Royals and Omaha Golden Spikes) have been the Triple-A affiliate of the Kansas City Royals since the Royals joined the American League in 1969, but the Columbus Clippers, having been affiliated with the New York Yankees since 1979, changed affiliations to the Washington Nationals in 2007, and again changed to the Cleveland Indians two years later in 2009.

The longest continuous affiliations are between the Philadelphia Phillies and their Double-A affiliate, the Reading Fightin Phils and between the Detroit Tigers and their Low-A affiliate, the Lakeland Flying Tigers, both of which date to 1965. Both Reading and Lakeland are now owned outright by their parent major league clubs.

== Presidents ==
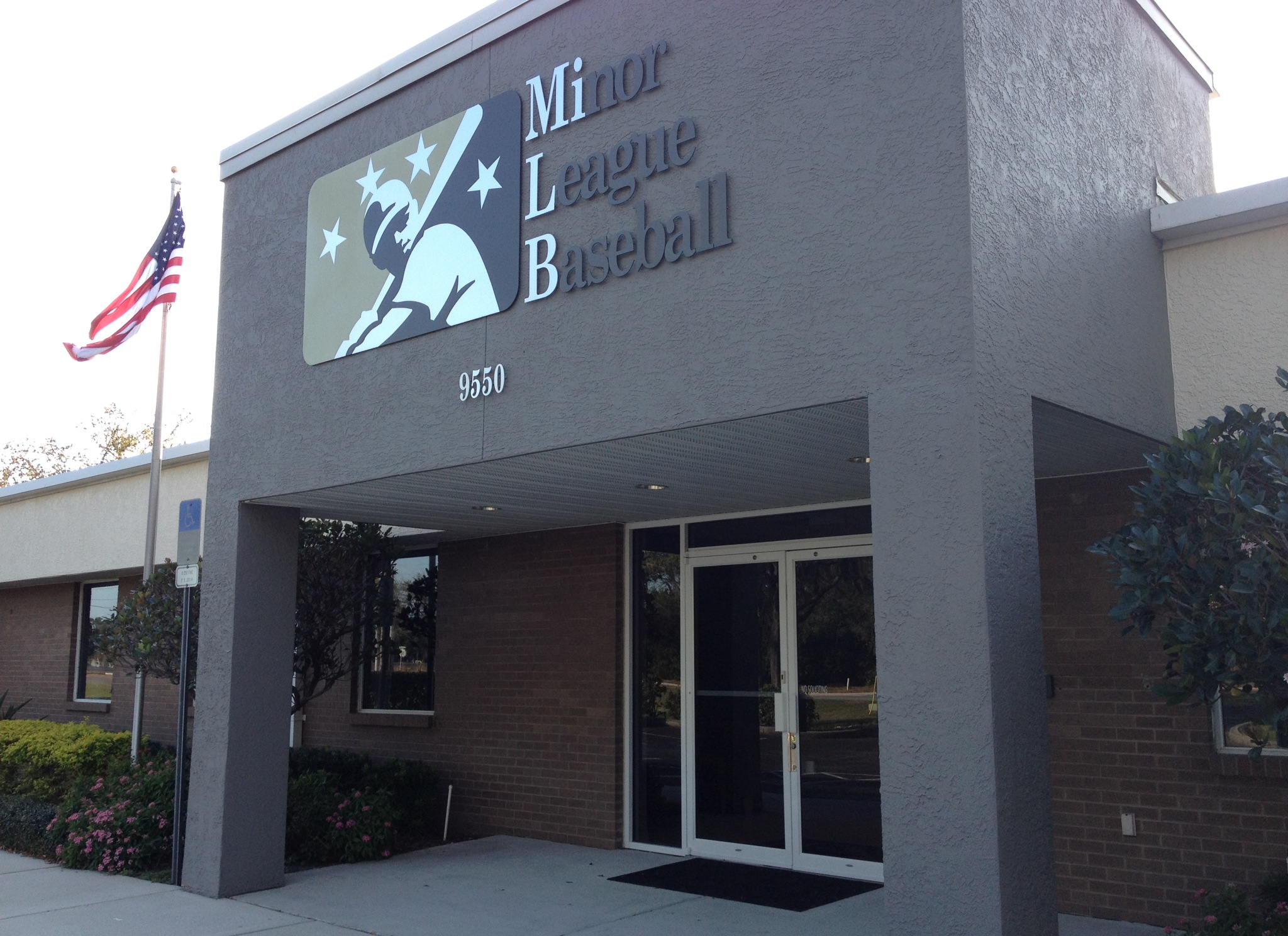
The former headquarters of MiLB in St. Petersburg, Florida; the league is now based in New York City

MiLB was governed through a centralized office until the restructuring of the minor leagues in 2021, with MLB itself now handling "all issues related to governance, scheduling, umpiring, license compliance, and other league administration functions". Minor league headquarters were located in St. Petersburg, Florida, from 1973 onward. As of 2009, MiLB had 27 employees in St. Petersburg. Before coming under the direct control of MLB, 11 people served as president of MiLB:

- Patrick T. Powers, 1901–1909
- Michael H. Sexton, 1910–1932
- William G. Bramham, 1933–1946
- George Trautman, 1947–1963
- Phil Piton, 1964–1971
- Hank Peters, 1972–1975
- Bobby Bragan, 1976–1978
- John H. Johnson, 1979–1988
- Sal Artiaga, 1988–1991
- Mike Moore, 1992–2007
- Pat O'Conner, 2007–2020

== Independent baseball ==
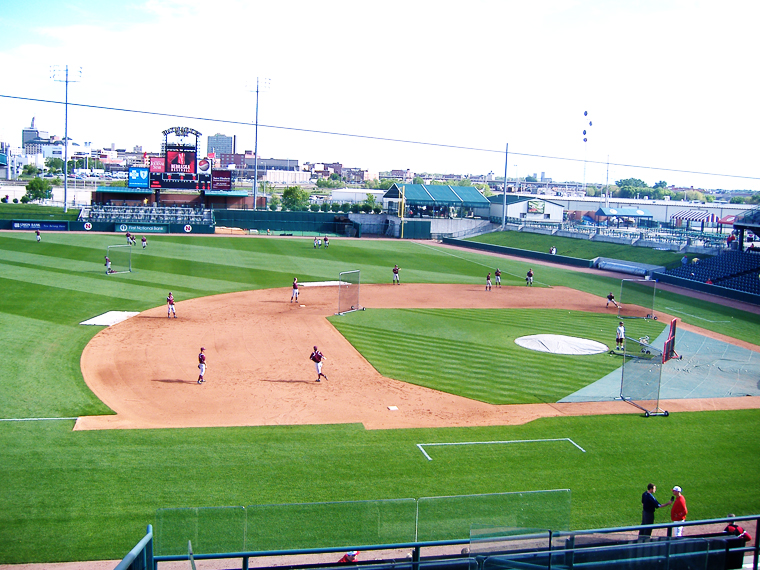
Haymarket Park, home to the Lincoln Saltdogs, an independent baseball team in Lincoln, Nebraska

Independent leagues are professional leagues in the United States and Canada not under the purview of organized MiLB and the Commissioner of Baseball. Independent baseball existed in the early 20th century and has become prominent again since 1993.

Leagues operated mostly autonomously before 1902, when the majority joined the NAPBL. From then until 1915, a total of eight new and existing leagues remained independent. Most joined the National Association after one season of independence. Notable exceptions were the California League, which was independent in 1902 and from 1907 to 1909; the United States Baseball League, which folded during its independent 1912 season; and the Colonial League, a National Association Member that went independent in 1915 and then folded. Another independent league, the Federal League, played at a level considered major league from 1914 to 1915.

Few independent leagues existed between 1915 and 1993. Major exceptions included the Carolina League and the Quebec-based Provincial League. The Carolina League, based in the North Carolina Piedmont region, gained a reputation as a notorious "outlaw league" during its existence from 1936 to 1938. The Provincial League fielded six teams across Quebec and was independent from 1948 to 1949. Similarly to early 20th-century independent leagues, it joined the National Association in 1950, playing for six more years.

Independent leagues saw new growth after 1992, after the new Professional Baseball Agreement in organized baseball instituted more stringent revenue and stadium requirements on members. Over the next eight years, at least 16 independent leagues formed, of which six existed in 2002. As of the 2025 season, there are seven active leagues, with four of them acting as MLB Partner Leagues.

== Awards ==
=== MiLBY Awards ===
The MiLBY Awards (formerly "This Year in Minor League Baseball Awards") are given in nine categories. In five categories (Best Starter, Best Hitter, Best Reliever, Best Game, and Best Team), winners are selected at each level of Minor League Baseball above Rookie league. In three categories (Play of the Year, Moment of the Year, and Homer of the Year), one overall winner is chosen for all of Minor League Baseball. In the remaining category (Promo of the Year), there are overall winners in each of five subcategories: Best Promotion (of all types), Best Theme Night, Best Giveaway, Best Celebrity Appearance, and Best Miscellaneous Promotion.

=== Other player awards ===
- MiLB Topps Minor League Player of the Year Award – first issued in 1960; has not happened since 2013
- MiLB George M. Trautman Awards – Topps Player of the Year in each of the domestic minor leagues
- MiLB Joe Bauman Home Run Award – awarded since 2002
- Baseball America Minor League Player of the Year Award – awarded since 1981
- The Sporting News Minor League Player of the Year Award – awarded 1936–2007
- USA Today Minor League Player of the Year Award – awarded since 1988

=== Major awards ===
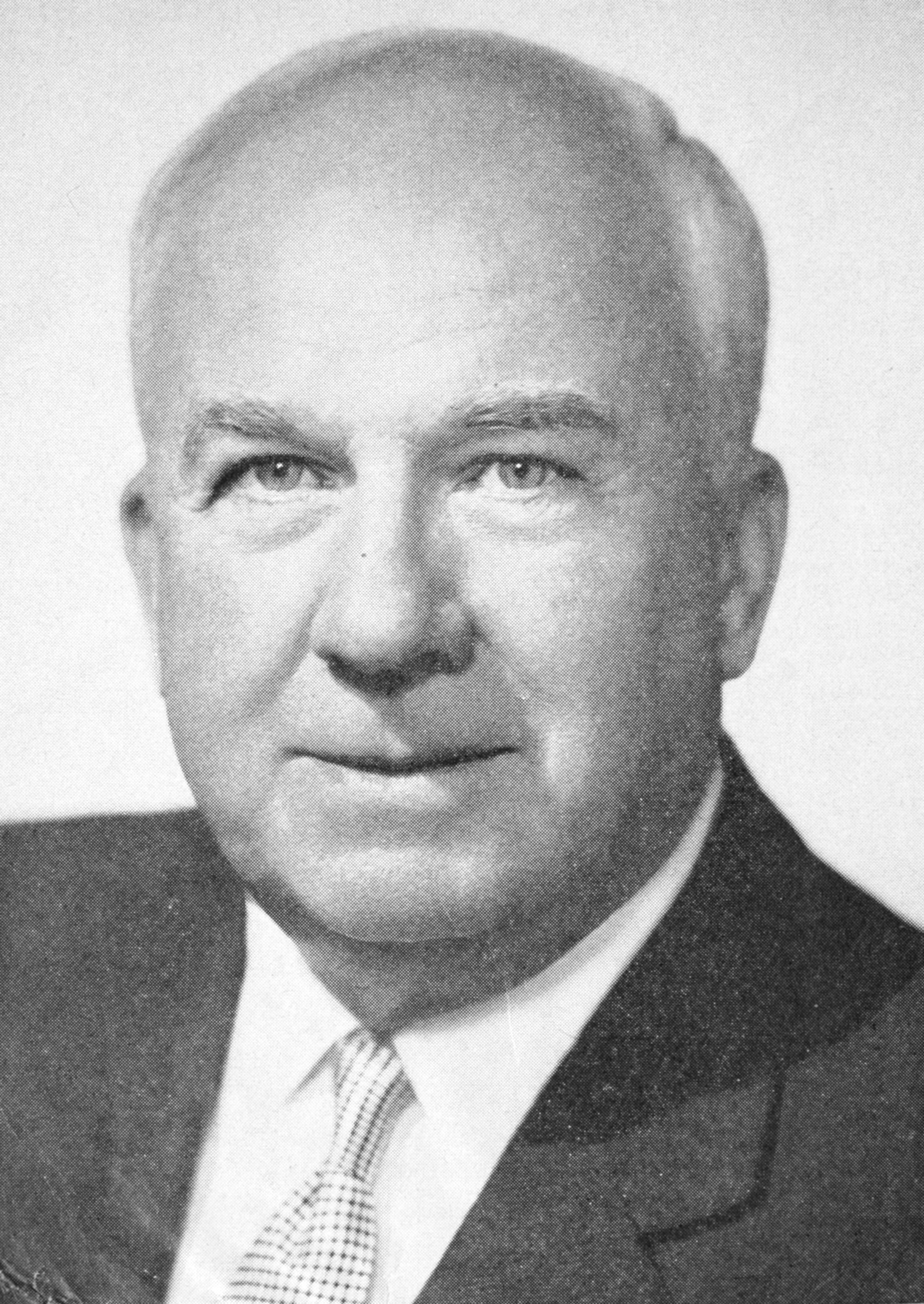
Warren Giles, namesake of the league president annual award

- Organization of the Year Award (formerly the John H. Johnson President's Award) (1974) – given each year, MiLB's top award recognizes "the complete baseball franchise—based on franchise stability, contributions to league stability, contributions to baseball in the community, and promotion of the baseball industry".
- Rawlings Woman Executive of the Year (1976) – given each year to a woman in MiLB for exceptional contributions to her club, her league, or baseball.
- Warren Giles Award (1984) – given each year to a league president for outstanding service.
- King of Baseball (1951) – given annually in recognition of longtime dedication and service to professional baseball.
- Larry MacPhail Award (1966–2019) – given annually in recognition of team promotions.
- Sheldon "Chief" Bender Award (2008) – given to a person with distinguished service who has been instrumental in player development.
- Mike Coolbaugh Award (2008) – given to someone who has shown an outstanding baseball work ethic, knowledge of the game, and skill in mentoring young players on the field.
- John H. Moss Community Service Award (2013) – given to a team to recognize outstanding charitable service, support, and leadership.
- Charles K. Murphy Patriot Award (2016) – given to an individual or team to recognize outstanding support of and engagement with the United States Armed Forces and veterans.

=== Top 100 teams ===
During its centennial celebration in 2001, MiLB compiled a list of the 100 best minor-league baseball teams of the century.

== Broadcasting ==
=== Radio ===
Nearly every minor-league team has its own local radio contract, though unlike their major-league counterparts, these generally consist of only one or two individual stations.

Also see: Sports radio networks in the United States (MiLB is a sub-template).

=== Television ===
Nationally, MiLB games air on Stadium and MLB Network.

Many individual teams have contracts with local television channels. For example, the Triple-A Indianapolis Indians had a contract with WISH-TV to air 35 home games during the 2021 season.

=== Streaming media ===
MiLB.TV is the minor leagues' online video streaming service, in the vein of MLB's MLB.tv. Entering the 2021 season, the subscription service offers games for all Triple-A and Double-A teams, and select games from other classifications. All games also stream for free on the Bally Live App.

TuneIn has provided free audio streams to minor league games, accessible through the MiLB.TV website.

== Attendances ==
The top 50 Minor League Baseball teams by average home attendance in 2025:

#	Team	Total	Average
1	Lehigh Valley IronPigs	585,167	7,908
2	Dayton Dragons	490,468	7,664
3	Indianapolis Indians	570,677	7,660
4	Columbus Clippers	513,085	7,077
5	Nashville Sounds	500,002	6,757
6	Albuquerque Isotopes	493,849	6,629
7	Richmond Flying Squirrels	446,679	6,617
8	Las Vegas Aviators	491,889	6,559
9	Durham Bulls	485,021	6,510
10	El Paso Chihuahuas	472,125	6,337
11	Worcester Red Sox	455,467	6,114
12	Toledo Mud Hens	452,049	6,027
13	Rochester Red Wings	431,265	5,868
14	Reading Fightin Phils	396,455	5,830
15	Buffalo Bisons	425,517	5,829
16	Tacoma Rainiers	430,813	5,744
17	West Michigan Whitecaps	373,025	5,695
18	Hartford Yard Goats	389,496	5,686
19	St. Paul Saints	420,428	5,681
20	Charlotte Knights	425,461	5,673
21	Frisco RoughRiders	383,515	5,640
22	Iowa Cubs	409,706	5,499
23	Portland Sea Dogs	366,442	5,429
24	Salt Lake Bees	395,534	5,309
25	Oklahoma City Comets	395,026	5,267
26	Somerset Patriots	348,758	5,054
27	Norfolk Tides	370,537	5,041
28	Fort Wayne TinCaps	327,542	5,001
29	Jacksonville Jumbo Shrimp	359,679	4,796
30	Round Rock Express	354,867	4,732
31	Reno Aces	352,375	4,698
32	Tulsa Drillers	322,452	4,673
33	South Bend Cubs	305,311	4,661
34	Amarillo Sod Poodles	319,646	4,633
35	Greenville Drive	305,267	4,625
36	Syracuse Mets	342,977	4,573
37	Louisville Bats	328,441	4,379
38	Tennessee Smokies	295,460	4,345
39	Altoona Curve	293,487	4,284
40	Vancouver Canadians	277,990	4,212
41	Lansing Lugnuts	275,713	4,177
42	Corpus Christi Hooks	278,653	4,068
43	Charleston RiverDogs	264,227	4,065
44	Sacramento River Cats	302,973	4,040
45	Winston-Salem Dash	262,074	4,032
46	Wichita Wind Surge	277,722	4,025
47	Rocket City Trash Pandas	275,423	4,021
48	Akron RubberDucks	274,686	4,010
49	Spokane Indians	264,416	4,006
50	San Antonio Missions	269,383	3,933

== See also ==
- History of baseball
- List of Minor League Baseball lists
- The Official Professional Baseball Rules Book
- Independent baseball league
- Korea Baseball Futures League
- Eastern League and Western League of Japan
