= John H. Johnson (baseball) =

American baseball executive (1921–1988)

- Born: September 26, 1921; Staten Island, New York, U.S.
- Died: January 12, 1988 (aged 66); St. Petersburg, Florida, U.S.
- Occupation: Minor League Baseball president
- Years active: 1979–1988

John H. Johnson (September 26, 1921 – January 12, 1988) was an American baseball executive, whose most significant role was as president of the National Association of Professional Baseball Leagues from 1979 through 1988. He was born in Staten Island, New York.

Johnson was credited with helping the then struggling organization stabilize and grow. During his ten-year tenure, he was in charge of 17 minor league circuits and 176 teams throughout the United States. One of his most important achievements was an extensive overhaul of the master player development contract, which governs the relations between Major League Baseball organizations and their mostly independently owned Minor League affiliates.

== Early life ==
Johnson, whose strength was as an administrator, joined the New York Yankees organization in 1947, working for them for 24 years. He served initially as secretary to general manager George Weiss. Johnson was later promoted as general manager of the Double-A Binghamton Triplets farm club, traveling secretary for the Yankees, and finally as vice president for minor league operations.

When Bowie Kuhn was elected baseball commissioner in 1969, Johnson joined his office staff for the next eight years. Following his stint as administrator for Kuhn, Johnson was unanimously elected as president of the National Association of Professional Baseball Leagues at the Winter Meetings held in 1978, succeeding Bobby Bragan. Johnson received a five-year contract extension in 1981 and was re-elected to a three-year term in 1986. With Johnson at the helm, the NAPBL attendance soared to more than 20 million fans in 1987, a figure not matched since the 1953 season.

Johnson was diagnosed with chest cancer in September 1987. He was a long-time resident of St. Petersburg, Florida, where he died in January 1988 at the age of 66.

The John H. Johnson President's Award, is considered the most prestigious recognition given by Minor League Baseball and is awarded annually to honor the complete minor league franchise, based on franchise stability, contributions to league stability, contributions to baseball in the community, and promotion of the baseball industry. Originally known only as the President's Award when it was created in 1974, it was renamed in Johnson's honor starting with the 1988 season.
