= Cocoa Mets =

- 1964; Cocoa, Florida

Minor league affiliations
- Class: Rookie (1964)
- League: Cocoa Rookie League (1964)

Major league affiliations
- Team: New York Mets (1964)

Minor league titles
- League titles (0): None

Team data
- Name: Cocoa Mets (1964)
- Ballpark: Cocoa Expo Sports Center (1964)

The Cocoa Mets were a minor league baseball team based in Cocoa, Florida in 1964. The Cocoa Mets played exclusively as members of the four–team Rookie level Cocoa Rookie League, placing second in the league standings, with all league games played at the Cocoa Expo Sports Center. The Cocoa Mets were a minor league affiliate of the New York Mets in 1964.

== History ==
The Cocoa Rookie League began play in the 1964 season, with all games based in Cocoa, Florida. The Cocoa "Mets" became members of the four–team Rookie level Cocoa Rookie League. The Cocoa Colts, Cocoa Tigers and Melbourne Twins joined the Mets in the four–team league, beginning play on July 1, 1964.

On July 3, 1964, Cocoa Met pitcher Tug McGraw threw a 7–inning no-hitter in his professional debut. McGraw defeated the Cocoa Colts 4–0 in the victory.

In their only season of play, the Cocoa Mets placed second in the Cocoa Rookie League final standings. With a record of 28–22, playing under manager Ken Deal, the Mets finished 5.0 games the first place Melbourne Twins (34–18) in the final regular season standings. Cocoa Met player Al Yates led the Cocoa Rookie League with 31 RBI, while Yates and teammate John Agnetti tied with Gerald Lyscio of the Twins for the league lead with 2 home runs each.

The complex–based Mets and other Cocoa Rookie League teams charged fans no admission to games and individual attendance records were not kept, as the league drew a total of 1,683 fans for the season.

The Cocoa Rookie League did not return to play in 1965. The next season, Cocoa, Florida hosted the Cocoa Astros, who began play as members of the 1965 Class A level Florida State League.

== The ballparks ==
The Cocoa Rookie League teams played games at the Cocoa Expo Sports Center.

== Year–by–year record ==
Year	Record	Finish	Manager	Playoffs/Notes
1964	28–22	2nd	Ken Deal	No playoffs held

== Notable alumni ==
- Jim Bethke (1964)
- Kevin Collins (1964)
- Ken Deal (1964, MGR)
- Tug McGraw (1964) New York Mets Hall of Fame
- Al Yates (1964)

== See also ==
- Cocoa Rookie League Mets players

== External references ==
- Cocoa - Baseball Reference
