= Cocoa Rookie League =

American baseball league

- Classification: Rookie (1964)
- Sport: Minor League Baseball
- First season: 1964
- Folded: 1964
- President: Unknown (1964)
- No. of teams: 4
- Country: United States of America
- Venue: Cocoa Expo Sports Center
- Most titles: 1 Melbourne Twins (1964)
- Related competitions: Sarasota Rookie League

The Cocoa Rookie League, based in Cocoa and Melbourne, Florida, was an American minor professional baseball league that operated for one season, 1964. One of the first spring training-complex-based circuits, it was graded at the Rookie-league level, which is the lowest level of minor league baseball.

== History ==
=== Instruction-driven league for youngsters ===
Its four teams were owned and operated by Major League Baseball teams seeking a means to develop 18- and 19-year-old players who had just signed their first professional contracts. The contraction in leagues and teams during the 1950s and early 1960s had caused a major reorganization of the structure of minor league baseball in 1963, and the two Florida rookie circuits created in 1964 (the Sarasota Rookie League along the Gulf Coast was the other) were founded to offer an entry-level league for inexperienced players who might struggle in the other Rookie-level circuits, the Appalachian League and the Pioneer League. The complex-based teams charged no admission (individual attendance records were not kept) and the emphasis was on baseball fundamentals instruction for the young players.

The four teams — operated by the Detroit Tigers, Houston Colt .45s, Minnesota Twins and New York Mets — competed against each other in a league schedule of over 50 games, with the Twins' entry — led by 19—year-old Rod Carew, a future member of the Baseball Hall of Fame — taking the CRL pennant by five games over the Mets' club. Total attendance for the year was only 1,683. The Cocoa Rookie League folded after the season, while the Sarasota—based circuit became the basis for the Gulf Coast League, which still plays today. A successor to the CRL, the Florida East Coast League, operated in 1972 in Cocoa and Melbourne.

== Cocoa Rookie League teams ==
- Cocoa Colts
- Cocoa Mets
- Cocoa Tigers
- Melbourne Twins

== Standings & statistics ==
1964 Cocoa Rookie League

Team standings	W	L	PCT	GB	Managers
Melbourne Twins	34	18	.654	--	Fred Waters
Cocoa Mets	28	22	.560	5.0	Ken Deal
Cocoa Colts	23	29	.442	11.0	Dave Philley
Cocoa Tigers	17	33	.340	16.0	Doc Daugherty

All games played at Cocoa, Florida
Total Attendance: 1,683
Playoffs: None Scheduled.

Player statistics
Player	Team	Stat	Tot	Player	Team	Stat	Tot
Lawrence Seneta	Tigers	BA	.383	Gerald Lyscio	Twins	W	7
Jim Bachus	Twins	Runs	44	Claude Melton	Twins	SO	63
Lawrence Seneta	Tigers	Hits	52	Claude Melton	Twins	ERA	1.22
Al Yates	Mets	RBI	31	Al Yates	Mets	HR	2
John Agnetti	Mets	HR	2	Gerald Lyscio	Twins	HR	2
