= Cocoa Tigers =

- 1964; Cocoa, Florida

Minor league affiliations
- Class: Rookie (1964)
- League: Cocoa Rookie League (1964)

Major league affiliations
- Team: Detroit Tigers (1964)

Minor league titles
- League titles (0): None

Team data
- Name: Cocoa Tigers (1964)
- Ballpark: Cocoa Expo Sports Center (1964)

The Cocoa Tigers were a minor league baseball team based in Cocoa, Florida in the 1964 season. The Cocoa Tigers played exclusively as members of the four–team Rookie level Cocoa Rookie League, with all league games played at the Cocoa Expo Sports Center. The Cocoa Tigers were a minor league affiliate of the Detroit Tigers in 1964 and placed fourth in the standings.

Baseball Hall of Fame member Jim Leyland played for the Cocoa Tigers.

== History ==
The Cocoa Rookie League began play in the 1964 season, with all games based in Cocoa, Florida. The Cocoa "Tigers" became members of the four–team Rookie level Cocoa Rookie League. The Cocoa Colts, Cocoa Mets and Melbourne Twins joined the Cocoa Tigers in the four–team league, beginning league play on July 1, 1964.

On July 4, 1964, The Tigers were on the losing end as Melbourne Twins' pitchers Jerry Lyscio and Gene Melton threw a combined 7–inning no-hitter in a 2–0 victory over the Cocoa Tigers.

In their only season of play, the Cocoa Tigers finished last in the Cocoa Rookie League final standings. With a record of 17–33, playing under manager Doc Daugherty, the Tigers placed fourth and finished 16.0 games the first place Melbourne Twins (34–18) in the final regular season standings, as the league had no playoffs. The Tigers also finished behind the second place Cocoa Mets (28–22) and third place Cocoa Colts (23–29). Cocoa Tiger player Lawrence Seneta won the Cocoa Rookie League batting title with a .383 batting average. Seneta also led the league with 52 total hits.

The complex–based Tigers and other 1964 Cocoa Rookie League teams did not charge paid admission to games and individual attendance records were not kept. The league drew 1,683 total fans for the season. The Cocoa Rookie League folded after one season of play.

In the following season, Cocoa, Florida hosted the Cocoa Astros, who began play as members of the 1965 Class A level Florida State League.

== The ballparks ==
The Cocoa Rookie League teams played games at the Cocoa Expo Sports Center. The facility was built in 1964 and initially hosted the Houston Astros spring training. Still in use today, the complex is located at 500 Friday Road, Cocoa, Florida.

== Year–by–year record ==
Year	Record	Finish	Manager	Playoffs/Notes
1964	17–33	4th	Doc Daugherty	No playoffs held

== Notable alumni ==
- Jim Leyland (1964) Inducted Baseball Hall of Fame, 2023
- Doc Daugherty (1964, MGR)
- Mike Kilkenny (1964)
- Ray Newman (1964)

== See also ==
- Cocoa Rookie League Tigers players

== External references ==
- Cocoa - Baseball Reference
