= List of Houston Astros minor league affiliates =

Current Houston Astros domestic minor league affiliate locations

The Houston Astros farm system consists of seven Minor League Baseball affiliates across the United States and in the Dominican Republic. Four teams are independently owned, while three—the Florida Complex League Astros and two Dominican Summer League Astros squads—are owned by the major league club.

The Astros have been affiliated with the Double-A Corpus Christi Hooks of the Texas League since 2005, making it the longest-running active affiliation in the organization. The longest continuous affiliation in team history was the 21-year relationship with the Double-A Southern League's Columbus Astros/Mudcats from 1970 to 1990. Their newest affiliates are the Triple-A Sugar Land Space Cowboys of the Pacific Coast League and the High-A Asheville Tourists of the South Atlantic League, which became Astros affiliates in 2021.

Geographically, Houston's closest domestic affiliate is the Sugar Land Space Cowboys, which are approximately 20 miles (32 km) away. Houston's furthest domestic affiliate is the Single-A Fayetteville Woodpeckers of the Carolina League some 1,165 miles (1,875 km) away.

== Current affiliates ==
The Houston Astros farm system consists of seven minor league affiliates.

Class	Team	League	Location	Ballpark	Affiliated
Triple-A	Sugar Land Space Cowboys	Pacific Coast League	Sugar Land, Texas	Constellation Field	2021
Double-A	Corpus Christi Hooks	Texas League	Corpus Christi, Texas	Whataburger Field	2005
High-A	Asheville Tourists	South Atlantic League	Asheville, North Carolina	McCormick Field	2021
Single-A	Fayetteville Woodpeckers	Carolina League	Fayetteville, North Carolina	Segra Stadium	2017
Rookie	FCL Astros	Florida Complex League	West Palm Beach, Florida	The Ballpark of the Palm Beaches	2023
Rookie	DSL Astros Blue	Dominican Summer League	Boca Chica, Santo Domingo	Houston Astros Complex	2022
Rookie	DSL Astros Orange	Dominican Summer League	Boca Chica, Santo Domingo	Houston Astros Complex	2022

== Past affiliates ==
=== Key ===
Season	Each year is linked to an article about that particular Astros/Colt .45s season.

=== 1962 ===
Minor League Baseball operated with six classes (Triple-A, Double-A, Class A, Class B, Class C, and Class D) in 1962.

Season	Triple-A	Double-A	Class A	Class B	Class C	Class D	Ref.
1962	Oklahoma City 89ers	—	—	Durham Bulls	Modesto Colts	Moultrie Colt .22s	

=== 1963–1989 ===
Prior to the 1963 season, Major League Baseball (MLB) initiated a reorganization of Minor League Baseball that resulted in a reduction from six classes to four (Triple-A, Double-A, Class A, and Rookie) in response to the general decline of the minors throughout the 1950s and early-1960s when leagues and teams folded due to shrinking attendance caused by baseball fans' preference for staying at home to watch MLB games on television. The only change made within the next 27 years was Class A being subdivided for the first time to form Class A Short Season in 1966.

Season	Triple-A	Double-A	Class A	Class A Short Season	Rookie	Ref(s).
1963	Oklahoma City 89ers	San Antonio Bullets	Durham Bulls; Modesto Colts; Moultrie Colt .22s	—	—	
1964	Oklahoma City 89ers	San Antonio Bullets	Durham Bulls; Modesto Colts	—	Cocoa Colts	
1965	Oklahoma City 89ers	Amarillo Sonics	Cocoa Astros; Durham Bulls; Salisbury Astros	—	FRL Astros	
1966	Oklahoma City 89ers	Amarillo Sonics	Cocoa Astros; Durham Bulls; Salisbury Astros	Bismarck-Mandan Pards	—	
1967	Oklahoma City 89ers	Amarillo Sonics	Asheville Tourists; Cocoa Astros	—	Covington Astros	
1968	Oklahoma City 89ers	Dallas–Fort Worth Spurs	Cocoa Astros; Greensboro Patriots	—	Covington Astros	
1969	Oklahoma City 89ers	Savannah Senators (Note: In 1969, the Astros shared the Double-A Savannah Senators with the Washington Senators.)	Cocoa Astros; Peninsula Astros	Williamsport Astros	Covington Astros	
1970	Oklahoma City 89ers	Columbus Astros	Cocoa Astros	Williamsport Astros	Covington Astros	
1971	Oklahoma City 89ers	Columbus Astros	Cocoa Astros; Sumter Astros	—	Covington Astros	
1972	Oklahoma City 89ers	Columbus Astros	Cocoa Astros	—	Cocoa Astros; Covington Astros	
1973	Denver Bears	Columbus Astros	Cedar Rapids Astros	—	Covington Astros	
1974	Denver Bears	Columbus Astros	Cedar Rapids Astros	—	Covington Astros	
1975	Iowa Oaks	Columbus Astros	Dubuque Packers	—	Covington Astros	
1976	Memphis Blues	Columbus Astros	Dubuque Packers	—	Covington Astros	
1977	Charleston Charlies	Columbus Astros	Cocoa Astros	—	GCL Astros	
1978	Charleston Charlies	Columbus Astros	Daytona Beach Astros	—	GCL Astros	
1979	Charleston Charlies	Columbus Astros	Daytona Beach Astros	—	GCL Astros	
1980	Tucson Toros	Columbus Astros	Daytona Beach Astros	—	GCL Astros Blue; GCL Astros Orange	
1981	Tucson Toros	Columbus Astros	Daytona Beach Astros	—	GCL Astros Blue; GCL Astros Orange	
1982	Tucson Toros	Columbus Astros	Asheville Tourists; Daytona Beach Astros	Auburn Astros	GCL Astros	
1983	Tucson Toros	Columbus Astros	Asheville Tourists; Daytona Beach Astros	Auburn Astros	GCL Astros	
1984	Tucson Toros	Columbus Astros	Asheville Tourists; Daytona Beach Astros	Auburn Astros	GCL Astros	
1985	Tucson Toros	Columbus Astros	Asheville Tourists; Osceola Astros	Auburn Astros	GCL Astros	
1986	Tucson Toros	Columbus Astros	Asheville Tourists; Osceola Astros	Auburn Astros	GCL Astros	
1987	Tucson Toros	Columbus Astros	Asheville Tourists; Osceola Astros	Auburn Astros	GCL Astros	
1988	Tucson Toros	Columbus Astros	Asheville Tourists; Osceola Astros	Auburn Astros	GCL Astros	
1989	Tucson Toros	Columbus Mudcats	Asheville Tourists; Osceola Astros	Auburn Astros	GCL Astros; DSL Astros/Rangers/White Sox	

=== 1990–2020 ===
Minor League Baseball operated with six classes from 1990 to 2020. In 1990, the Class A level was subdivided for a second time with the creation of Class A-Advanced. The Rookie level consisted of domestic and foreign circuits.

Season	Triple-A	Double-A	Class A-Advanced	Class A	Class A Short Season	Rookie	Foreign Rookie	Ref(s).
1990	Tucson Toros	Columbus Mudcats	Osceola Astros	Asheville Tourists	Auburn Astros	GCL Astros	DSL Astros/Cardinals	
1991	Tucson Toros	Jackson Generals	Osceola Astros	Asheville Tourists	Auburn Astros	GCL Astros	DSL Astros	
1992	Tucson Toros	Jackson Generals	Osceola Astros	Asheville Tourists; Burlington Astros	Auburn Astros	GCL Astros	DSL Astros	
1993	Tucson Toros	Jackson Generals	Osceola Astros	Asheville Tourists; Quad Cities River Bandits	Auburn Astros	GCL Astros	DSL Astros; DSL Astros/Giants/Phillies	
1994	Tucson Toros	Jackson Generals	Osceola Astros	Quad Cities River Bandits	Auburn Astros	GCL Astros	DSL Astros/Brewers	
1995	Tucson Toros	Jackson Generals	Kissimmee Cobras	Quad Cities River Bandits	Auburn Astros	GCL Astros	DSL Astros/Brewers	
1996	Tucson Toros	Jackson Generals	Kissimmee Cobras	Quad Cities River Bandits	Auburn Doubledays	GCL Astros	DSL Astros/Red Sox	
1997	New Orleans Zephyrs	Jackson Generals	Kissimmee Cobras	Quad Cities River Bandits	Auburn Doubledays	GCL Astros	DSL Astros	
1998	New Orleans Zephyrs	Jackson Generals	Kissimmee Cobras	Quad Cities River Bandits	Auburn Doubledays	GCL Astros	DSL Astros	
1999	New Orleans Zephyrs	Jackson Generals	Kissimmee Cobras	Michigan Battle Cats	Auburn Doubledays	Martinsville Astros	DSL Astros	
2000	New Orleans Zephyrs	Round Rock Express	Kissimmee Cobras	Michigan Battle Cats	Auburn Doubledays	Martinsville Astros	DSL Astros	
2001	New Orleans Zephyrs	Round Rock Express	—	Lexington Legends; Michigan Battle Cats	Pittsfield Astros	Martinsville Astros	DSL Astros	
2002	New Orleans Zephyrs	Round Rock Express	—	Lexington Legends; Michigan Battle Cats	Tri-City ValleyCats	Martinsville Astros	DSL Astros; VSL Venoco	
2003	New Orleans Zephyrs	Round Rock Express	Salem Avalanche	Lexington Legends	Tri-City ValleyCats	Martinsville Astros	DSL Astros; VSL Venoco	
2004	New Orleans Zephyrs	Round Rock Express	Salem Avalanche	Lexington Legends	Tri-City ValleyCats	Greeneville Astros	DSL Astros; VSL Venoco 1	
2005	Round Rock Express	Corpus Christi Hooks	Salem Avalanche	Lexington Legends	Tri-City ValleyCats	Greeneville Astros	DSL Astros; VSL Astros	
2006	Round Rock Express	Corpus Christi Hooks	Salem Avalanche	Lexington Legends	Tri-City ValleyCats	Greeneville Astros	DSL Astros; VSL Astros	
2007	Round Rock Express	Corpus Christi Hooks	Salem Avalanche	Lexington Legends	Tri-City ValleyCats	Greeneville Astros	DSL Astros; VSL Astros	
2008	Round Rock Express	Corpus Christi Hooks	Salem Avalanche	Lexington Legends	Tri-City ValleyCats	Greeneville Astros	DSL Astros; VSL Astros	
2009	Round Rock Express	Corpus Christi Hooks	Lancaster JetHawks	Lexington Legends	Tri-City ValleyCats	Greeneville Astros; GCL Astros	DSL Astros	
2010	Round Rock Express	Corpus Christi Hooks	Lancaster JetHawks	Lexington Legends	Tri-City ValleyCats	Greeneville Astros; GCL Astros	DSL Astros	
2011	Oklahoma City RedHawks	Corpus Christi Hooks	Lancaster JetHawks	Lexington Legends	Tri-City ValleyCats	Greeneville Astros; GCL Astros	DSL Astros	
2012	Oklahoma City RedHawks	Corpus Christi Hooks	Lancaster JetHawks	Lexington Legends	Tri-City ValleyCats	Greeneville Astros; GCL Astros	DSL Astros	
2013	Oklahoma City RedHawks	Corpus Christi Hooks	Lancaster JetHawks	Quad Cities River Bandits	Tri-City ValleyCats	Greeneville Astros; GCL Astros	DSL Astros	
2014	Oklahoma City RedHawks	Corpus Christi Hooks	Lancaster JetHawks	Quad Cities River Bandits	Tri-City ValleyCats	Greeneville Astros; GCL Astros	DSL Astros Blue; DSL Astros Orange	
2015	Fresno Grizzlies	Corpus Christi Hooks	Lancaster JetHawks	Quad Cities River Bandits	Tri-City ValleyCats	Greeneville Astros; GCL Astros	DSL Astros Blue; DSL Astros Orange	
2016	Fresno Grizzlies	Corpus Christi Hooks	Lancaster JetHawks	Quad Cities River Bandits	Tri-City ValleyCats	Greeneville Astros; GCL Astros	DSL Astros Blue; DSL Astros Orange	
2017	Fresno Grizzlies	Corpus Christi Hooks	Buies Creek Astros	Quad Cities River Bandits	Tri-City ValleyCats	Greeneville Astros; GCL Astros	DSL Astros Blue; DSL Astros Orange	
2018	Fresno Grizzlies	Corpus Christi Hooks	Buies Creek Astros	Quad Cities River Bandits	Tri-City ValleyCats	GCL Astros	DSL Astros	
2019	Round Rock Express	Corpus Christi Hooks	Fayetteville Woodpeckers	Quad Cities River Bandits	Tri-City ValleyCats	GCL Astros	DSL Astros	
2020 (Note: The 2020 Minor League Baseball season was cancelled due to the COVID-19 pandemic.)	Round Rock Express	Corpus Christi Hooks	Fayetteville Woodpeckers	Quad Cities River Bandits	Tri-City ValleyCats	GCL Astros	DSL Astros (Note: In 2020, the Astros planned to operate two Dominican Summer League teams but did not announce specific names for each squad.); DSL Astros	

=== 2021–present ===
The current structure of Minor League Baseball is the result of an overall contraction of the system beginning with the 2021 season. Class A was reduced to two levels: High-A and Low-A. Low-A was reclassified as Single-A in 2022.

Season	Triple-A	Double-A	High-A	Single-A	Rookie	Foreign Rookie	Ref.
2021	Sugar Land Skeeters	Corpus Christi Hooks	Asheville Tourists	Fayetteville Woodpeckers	FCL Astros	DSL Astros	
2022	Sugar Land Space Cowboys	Corpus Christi Hooks	Asheville Tourists	Fayetteville Woodpeckers	FCL Astros Blue; FCL Astros Orange	DSL Astros Blue; DSL Astros Orange	
2023	Sugar Land Space Cowboys	Corpus Christi Hooks	Asheville Tourists	Fayetteville Woodpeckers	FCL Astros	DSL Astros Blue; DSL Astros Orange	
2024	Sugar Land Space Cowboys	Corpus Christi Hooks	Asheville Tourists	Fayetteville Woodpeckers	FCL Astros	DSL Astros Blue; DSL Astros Orange	
2025	Sugar Land Space Cowboys	Corpus Christi Hooks	Asheville Tourists	Fayetteville Woodpeckers	FCL Astros	DSL Astros Blue; DSL Astros Orange	
2026	Sugar Land Space Cowboys	Corpus Christi Hooks	Asheville Tourists	Fayetteville Woodpeckers	FCL Astros	DSL Astros Blue; DSL Astros Orange	
