= Florida Complex League Cardinals =

- (1966–1976, 2007–present); Jupiter, Florida

Minor league affiliations
- Class: Rookie
- League: Florida Complex League
- Division: East Division
- Previous leagues: Gulf Coast League (1966–1976, 2007–2020); Florida Rookie League (1965); Sarasota Rookie League (1964)

Major league affiliations
- Team: St. Louis Cardinals

Minor league titles
- League titles (1): 2016
- Division titles (4): 2012; 2014; 2016; 2018

Team data
- Name: FCL Cardinals
- Previous names: GCL Cardinals (1966–1976, 2007–2020); FRL Cardinals (1965); SRL Cardinals (1964)
- Ballpark: Roger Dean Stadium
- Owner/ Operator: St. Louis Cardinals
- Manager: Willi Martin

The Florida Complex League Cardinals or FCL Cardinals are a rookie league affiliate of the St. Louis Cardinals, competing in the Florida Complex League of Minor League Baseball. Prior to 2021, the team was known as the Gulf Coast League Cardinals. The team plays its home games in Jupiter, Florida, at Roger Dean Stadium, which is also the spring training home of the St. Louis Cardinals and the Miami Marlins. The team is mainly composed of players who are in their first year of professional baseball either as draftees or non-drafted free agents.

== History ==
The team first competed in the Sarasota Rookie League in 1964 and the Florida Rookie League in 1965, predecessors of the Gulf Coast League (GCL), which began play in 1966. The team competed until 1976, then was absent from the league for 30 years.

In 2007, the team returned to the GCL, and has operated continuously since then. The team claimed its first league championship in 2016. Prior to the start of the 2021 season, the Gulf Coast League was renamed as the Florida Complex League.

The FCL Cardinals play in the FCL Southeast division against rookie league affiliates of the Mets, Astros, Marlins, and Nationals.

== Season by season ==
Year	Record	Finish	Manager	Playoffs
SRL Cardinals (1964)
1964	30-30	2nd	Fred Koenig	No playoffs
FRL Cardinals (1965)
1965	27-31	5th	George Kissell	No playoffs
GCL Cardinals (1966–76)
1966	20-28	5th	George Kissell	No playoffs until 1983
1967	25-32	6th	George Kissell	
1968	34-27	2nd	George Kissell/Ray Hathaway	
1969	21-33	7th	Tom Burgess	
1970	32-28	5th	Tom Burgess	
1971	20-33	7th	Tom Burgess	
1972	27-32	5th	Bobby Dews	
1973	25-30	7th	Ken Boyer	
1974	27-21	5th	Bobby Dews/Tom Burgess	
1975	17-37	7th	Fred Koenig	
1976	27-24	4th	Dave Ricketts	
GCL Cardinals (2007–2020)
2007	24-30	12th	Eude Brito	
2008	17-38	15th	Eude Brito	
2009	25-31	12th	Steve Turco	
2010	28-28	8th	Steve Turco	
2011	31-24	5th	Steve Turco	
2012	34-24	3rd	Steve Turco	Lost in 1st round vs. GCL Pirates (1 game to 0)
2013	24-35	15th	Steve Turco	
2014	37-23	2nd	Steve Turco	Lost in 1st round vs. GCL Red Sox (1 game to 0)
2015	34-25	5th (t)	Steve Turco	Lost in 1st round vs. GCL Red Sox (1 game to 0)
2016	33-21	1st	Steve Turco	League Champs vs. GCL Red Sox (1 game to 0); Won in first round vs. GCL Phillies (2 games to 1)
2017	26-29	11th	Steve Turco	
2018	40-16	1st	Erick Almonte	Won in first round vs. GCL Phillies East (1 game to 0); Lost in League Finals vs. GCL Tigers East (2 games to 1)
2019	20-34	16th	Josh Lopez	Playoffs cancelled due to Hurricane Dorian
2020	No Season due to pandemic			
FCL Cardinals (2021–present)
2021	24-29	11th	Roberto Espinoza	
2022	25-29	11th	Roberto Espinoza	
2023	17-33	14th	Roberto Espinoza	
2024	20-33	13th	Roberto Espinoza	
2025	24-31	11th	Willi Martin	

== Roster ==
Florida Complex League Cardinals roster
Players	Coaches/Other
Pitchers: -- Liam Best; 32 Andrew Bolívar; -- Cade Crossland; -- Antoni Cuello; -- Dylan Driessen; -- Kaden Echeman; -- Payton Graham; -- Brian Holiday; -- Robbie Knowles; -- Jack Martinez; -- Rubén Menes; 41 Brailyn Paulino; -- Keiverson Ramírez; -- Owen Rice; -- Jake Shelagowski; -- Giovanni Vargas; -- Ethan Young; Catchers: 22 Paulo Asprilla; 37 Alejandro Lóaiza; 26 Chris Lopez; Infielders: 86 Ryan Mitchell; 7 Yairo Padilla; 12 Daniel Rojas; -- Johnfrank Salazar; -- Bracewell Taveras; Outfielders: 33 Andru Arthur; 53 Facundo Velásquez	Manager: 25 Willi Martin; Coaches: 55 Erick Almonte (hitting); -- Luis Cruz (assistant); -- Jordan Hara (hitting); -- Gary Kendall (bench); 62 Dernier Orozco (pitching); 60-day injured list: 54 Jefferson Moran; 7-day injured list; * On St. Louis Cardinals 40-man roster; ~ Development list; # Rehab assignment; ∞ Reserve list; ‡ Restricted list; § Suspended list; † Temporarily inactive list; Roster updated March 25, 2026; Transactions; → More rosters: MiLB • Florida Complex League; → St. Louis Cardinals minor league players
