= Sarasota Rookie League =

Baseball league

- Classification: Rookie (1964)
- Sport: Minor League Baseball
- First season: 1964
- Folded: 1964
- Replaced by: Florida Rookie League
- President: Bill Harbour
- No. of teams: 4
- Country: United States
- Venue: Payne Park
- Most titles: 1 SRL Braves (1964)
- Related competitions: Cocoa Rookie League; Gulf Coast League

The Sarasota Rookie League was a minor baseball league that played in 1964 as a Rookie level league. All league games were played in Sarasota, Florida. The Sarasota Rookie League was succeeded in 1965 by the Florida Rookie League, which evolved into the Gulf Coast League in 1966. The 1964 Cocoa Rookie League operated simultaneously with the Sarasota Rookie League.

== History ==
The four–team Sarasota Rookie League formed for the 1964 season. League teams played a 59–game schedule, beginning play on July 1, 1964 and ending on August 31, 1964.

The Sarasota Rookie League and Cocoa Rookie League were formed simultaneously in 1964. The new concept was to provide leagues with a short–season schedule that provided attendance options for fans and to assist major league teams in developing beginning professional players while further utilizing spring training facilities. Today, the Florida Complex League continues play under the concept initiated in 1964.

The four Sarasota Rookie League teams were minor league affiliates of the Chicago White Sox, Milwaukee Braves, New York Yankees and St. Louis Cardinals. All league games were played in Sarasota, Florida, with teams taking the nickname of their affiliate.

Sarasota Rookie League games were hosted at Payne Park, which was called "Arthur Allyn Park" at the time and contained multiple ballfields. Arthur Allyn was the owner of the Chicago White Sox in 1964 when the league began play. Allyn was highly supportive of the rookie league concept.

The Sarasota Rookie League began play on July 1, 1964, with two games scheduled at 11:15 AM and played simultaneously at Arthur Allyn Park.

Player salaries in the league were between $400 and $500 per month.

The SRL Braves, playing under manager Paul Snyder, won the championship with a 36–23 record. The Braves finished 6.5 games ahead of the 2nd place SRL Cardinals in the final standings.

Leora Montgomery of the SRL Braves was chosen as the league most valuable player.

Following the 1964 season, the Sarasota Rookie League evolved into the six–team Florida Rookie League in 1965.

== 1964 Sarasota Rookie League teams ==
- SRL Braves
- SRL Cardinals
- SRL White Sox
- SRL Yankees

== Standings & statistics ==
1964 Sarasota Rookie League

Team standings	W	L	PCT	GB	Managers
SRL Braves	36	23	.610	-	Paul Snyder
SRL Cardinals	30	30	.500	6½	Fred Koenig
SRL White Sox	29	31	.483	7½	Frank Parenti
SRL Yankees	24	35	.407	12	Bill Shantz

Player statistics
Player	Team	Stat	Tot	Player	Team	Stat	Tot
Milton Minton	Braves	BA	.311	Alex Bonci	Braves	W	7
Leora Montgomery	Braves	Runs	34	Robert DuGuid	Braves	W	7
Milton Minton	Braves	Hits	61	Ken Murphy	Braves	W	7
Milton Minton	Braves	RBI	25	Tom Rowe	White Sox	SO	72
Michael Mantsch	Braves	HR	3	Alex Bonci	Braves	ERA	1.00
