= Cocoa Colts =

- 1964; Cocoa, Florida

Minor league affiliations
- Class: Rookie (1964)
- League: Cocoa Rookie League (1964)

Major league affiliations
- Team: Houston Colt .45's (1964)

Minor league titles
- League titles (0): None

Team data
- Name: Cocoa Colts (1964)
- Ballpark: Cocoa Expo Sports Center (1964)

The Cocoa Colts were a minor league baseball team based in Cocoa, Florida in 1964. The Cocoa Colts played exclusively as members of the four–team Rookie level Cocoa Rookie League, placing third in the standings, with all league games played at the Cocoa Expo Sports Center. The Cocoa Colts were so named as the team was a minor league affiliate of the Houston Colt .45's in 1964.

== History ==
The Cocoa Rookie League began play in the 1964 season, with all games based in Cocoa, Florida. The Cocoa "Colts" became members of the four–team Rookie level Cocoa Rookie League. The Cocoa Mets, Cocoa Tigers and Melbourne Twins joined the Colts in the four–team league, beginning league play on July 1, 1964.

The Colts were on the losing end of two no–hitters in 1964. On July 3, 1964, Cocoa Met pitcher Tug McGraw threw a 7–inning no-hitter in his professional debut against the Cocoa Colts. McGraw defeated the Colts 4–0 in the victory. On August 30, 1964, Gene Melton and Jerry Lyscio of the Melbourne Twins threw a combined 5–inning no–hitter in defeating the Colts by the score of 2–1.

In their only season of play, the Cocoa Colts placed third in the Cocoa Rookie League final standings. With a record of 23–29, playing under manager Dave Philley, the Colts finished 11.0 games the first place Melbourne Twins (34–18) in the final regular season standings. The Colts finished behind the second place Cocoa Mets (28–22) and ahead of the fourth place Cocoa Tigers (17–33) in the final standings, as the league had no playoffs. The Cocoa Rookie League permanently folded after one season of play.

The complex–based Colts and other Cocoa Rookie League teams charged fans no admission to games and individual attendance records were not kept. The Cocoa Rookie League games drew 1,683 total fans for the 1964 season schedule.

In the next season, Cocoa, Florida hosted the 1965 Cocoa Astros, who began play as members of the Class A level Florida State League.

== The ballpark ==
The Cocoa Rookie League teams played games at the Cocoa Expo Sports Center.

== Year–by–year record ==
Year	Record	Finish	Manager	Playoffs/Notes
1964	23–29	3rd	Dave Philley	No playoffs held

== Notable alumni ==
- Larry Dierker (1964) Houston Astros Hall of Fame
- Gene Ratliff (1964)
- Don Wilson (1964) Houston Astros Hall of Fame

== See also ==
- Cocoa Colts players

== External references ==
- Cocoa - Baseball Reference
