= Florida Complex League Braves =

- Founded in 1976; (1964–1967, 1976–present); North Port, Florida

Minor league affiliations
- Class: Rookie
- League: Florida Complex League
- Division: South Division
- Previous leagues: Gulf Coast League (1966–1967, 1976–2020); Florida Rookie League (1965); Sarasota Rookie League (1964)

Major league affiliations
- Team: Atlanta Braves
- Previous teams: Milwaukee Braves (1964–1965)

Minor league titles
- League titles (3): 1964; 2003; 2023
- Division titles (1): 2003

Team data
- Name: FCL Braves
- Previous names: GCL Braves (1976–2020); FRL Braves (1965); SRL Braves (1964)
- Ballpark: CoolToday Park
- Owner/ Operator: Atlanta Braves
- Manager: Cody Gabella
- Website: Official website

The Florida Complex League Braves are an American baseball team. They are the Rookie-level affiliate of the Atlanta Braves, competing in the Florida Complex League of Minor League Baseball. Prior to 2021, the team was known as the Gulf Coast League Braves. The team plays at CoolToday Park in North Port, Florida. The team is composed mainly of players who are in their first year of professional baseball either as draftees or non-drafted free agents from the United States, Canada, Dominican Republic, Venezuela, and other countries.

== History ==
The team traces its history to the earliest days of complex-based baseball, in reference to major-league teams' spring training complexes. Initially based in Sarasota, Florida, the team was a member of the short-lived Sarasota Rookie League (1964) and Florida Rookie League (1965), and was a charter club in the Gulf Coast League when it was formed in 1966. The team operated from 1964 to 1967, and has operated continuously since 1976.

In 2003, the Braves won a best-of-three series over the GCL Pirates to become league champions. Prior to the 2021 season, the Gulf Coast League was renamed as the Florida Complex League.

== Roster ==
Florida Complex League Braves roster
Players	Coaches/Other
Pitchers: 7 Gensi Angeles; 77 Luis Arestigueta; 64 Edward Cedano; 78 Victor Duarte; 40 Will Eldridge; 99 Brody Fowler; 22 Cayman Goode; 24 Ryan Heppner #; 39 Melvin Hidalgo; 71 Carter Holton #; 98 Dayner Matos; 58 Robinson Narciso; 38 Jorge Nunez; 75 Juan Olmos; 37 Yander Pinero; 8 Cesar Rodriguez; 28 Brett Sears #; 73 Wuilinyer Tovar; 14 Luisberth Valdez; 65 Nico Wagner; 63 Danny Young * #; Catchers: 17 Yoelvis Betancourt; 16 Arlenn Manzanillo; 46 Johan Rodriguez; Infielders: 11 Mario Baez; 94 Manuel Campos; 26 Yamvier Carrero; 4 Juan Elejandro; 76 Malvin Fernandez; Outfielders: 2 Owen Carey #; 43 Gabriel Cesa; 59 Juan Espinal; 52 Caden Merritt; 61 Diego Tornes	Manager: 20 Cody Gabbella; Coaches: 33 Sam Coe (pitching); 55 Einar Díaz (hitting); 19 Frank Duncan (pitching); 9 Yovan Gonzalez (coach); 23 Trey Polewsk (hitting); 15 Taylor Sanagorski (coach); 60-day injured list: -- Rayven Antonio (full season); -- Marcos Pol (full season); 9 Raudy Reyes (full season); 7-day injured list; * On Atlanta Braves 40-man roster; ~ Development list; # Rehab assignment; ∞ Reserve list; ‡ Restricted list; § Suspended list; † Temporarily inactive list; Roster updated June 22, 2026; Transactions; → More rosters: MiLB • Florida Complex League; → Atlanta Braves minor league players

== Season-by-season ==
Year	Record	Finish	Manager	Playoffs
SRL Braves (1964)
1964	36-23	1st	Paul Snyder	League Champs; No playoffs
FRL Braves (1965)
1965	34-25	2nd	Paul Snyder	No playoffs
GCL Braves
1966	27-21	2nd	Tom Saffell	No playoffs until 1983
1967	27-32	5th	Tom Saffell	
1976	21-32	6th	Chuck Goggin & Pedro Gonzalez	
1977	22-31	5th	Pedro Gonzalez	
1978	25-30	4th	Pedro Gonzalez	
1979	26-28	4th	Pedro Gonzalez	
1980	37-25	3rd	Pedro Gonzalez	
1981	28-34	8th	Pedro Gonzalez	
1982	32-31	4th	Pedro Gonzalez	
1983	32-28	4th	Pedro Gonzalez	
1984	31-32	6th	Pedro Gonzalez	
1985	26-35	7th	Pedro Gonzalez	
1986	29-34	9th	Pedro Gonzalez	
1987	20-43	10th	Pedro Gonzalez	
1988	16-47	12th	Pedro Gonzalez	
1989	37-26	4th (t)	Jim Procopio	
1990	33-29	6th	Jim Procopio	
1991	30-29	6th (t)	Jim Saul	
1992	22-37	14th	Jim Saul	
1993	32-26	4th	Jim Saul	
1994	13-46	15th	Jim Saul	
1995	14-43	16th	Jim Saul	
1996	14-45	16th	Robert Lucas (11-36) / Chino Cadahia (3-9)	
1997	21-38	15th	Frank Howard	
1998	25-35	11th (t)	Rick Albert	
1999	27-33	10th	Rick Albert	
2000	26-34	10th	Rick Albert	
2001	30-30	8th	Rick Albert	
2002	28-32	8th (t)	Jim Saul	
2003	38-22	1st	Ralph Henriquez	League Champs vs. GCL Pirates (2 games to 0); Won in 1st round vs. GCL Red Sox (1 games to 0)
2004	23-36	10th	Ralph Henriquez	
2005	24-28	8th	Luis Ortiz	
2006	23-27	8th	Luis Ortiz	
2007	17-43	15th	Luis Ortiz	
2008	29-29	9th (t)	Luis Ortiz	
2009	26-34	13th	Luis Ortiz	
2010	27-31	12th	Luis Ortiz	
2011	24-34	12th	Jonathan Schuerholz	
2012	21-37	14th	Rocket Wheeler	
2013	26-34	12th	Rocket Wheeler	
2014	29-30	9th	Rocket Wheeler	
2015	27-33	11th	Robinson Cancel	
