= Melbourne Twins =

- 1964–1972; (1964, 1972); Melbourne, Florida

Minor league affiliations
- Previous classes: Rookie (1964, 1972)
- Previous leagues: Cocoa Rookie League (1964); Florida East Coast League (1972)

Major league affiliations
- Previous teams: Minnesota Twins (1964, 1972)

Minor league titles
- League titles: 1964

Team data
- Previous parks: Cocoa Expo Sports Center (1964)

The Melbourne Twins were a minor league baseball team based in Melbourne, Florida, that played in the 1964 and 1972 seasons. The Melbourne Twins played as members of the Rookie level Cocoa Rookie League in 1964 and Florida East Coast League in 1972, with both leagues folding after one season of play. The Twins were a minor league affiliate of the Minnesota Twins in both seasons and won the 1964 league championship. Baseball Hall of Fame member Rod Carew played for the 1964 Melbourne Twins.

== History ==
The Cocoa Rookie League began play in the 1964 season, with all games based in Cocoa, Florida. The Melbourne "Twins" became charter members of the four–team Rookie level Cocoa Rookie League. The Cocoa Colts, Cocoa Mets and Cocoa Tigers joined the Twins in beginning league play on July 1, 1964.

Melbourne Twins' pitchers threw two no–hitters during the 1964 season. On July 4, 1964, Jerry Lyscio and Gene Melton threw a combined 7–inning no-hitter in a 2–0 victory over the Cocoa Tigers. On August 30, 1964, Lyscio and Melton combined for a second no–hitter in defeating the Cocoa Colts 2–1 in a 5–inning victory.

The Twins played in 1964 as members of the four team Cocoa Rookie League, playing under manager Fred Waters. The four teams, operated by the Detroit Tigers, Houston Colt .45s, Minnesota Twins and New York Mets, played a league schedule of over 50 games. The Twins ended the season with a 34–18 record and were led by 19—year-old Rod Carew, a future member of the Baseball Hall of Fame. The Twins won the Cocoa Rookie League championship, finishing 5.0 games ahead of the second place Mets' club. Total attendance for the year was only 1,683 for the entire league. The Cocoa Rookie League folded after the season, while the Sarasota—based circuit became the basis for the Gulf Coast League, which still plays today.

In 1972, a successor to the Cocoa Rookie League, the Florida East Coast League, operated for one season, with the four league teams based in Cocoa and Melbourne.

The 1972 Melbourne Twins were a charter member of the rookie-level Florida East Coast League. During the only season of Florida East Coast league play, the Twins posted a 35–22 record, which gave them second place in the league. The Twins finished 8.0 games behind the first place Melbourne Reds in the final standings.

== Notable alumni ==
- Rod Carew (1964) Inducted Baseball Hall of Fame, 1991
- Randy Bass (1972)
- Doug Clarey (1972)
- Dave Edwards (1972)
- Danny Morris (1964)
- Fred Waters (1964, MGR)
- Melbourne Twins players
