= Bryan De La Cruz =

Dominican baseball player (born 1996)

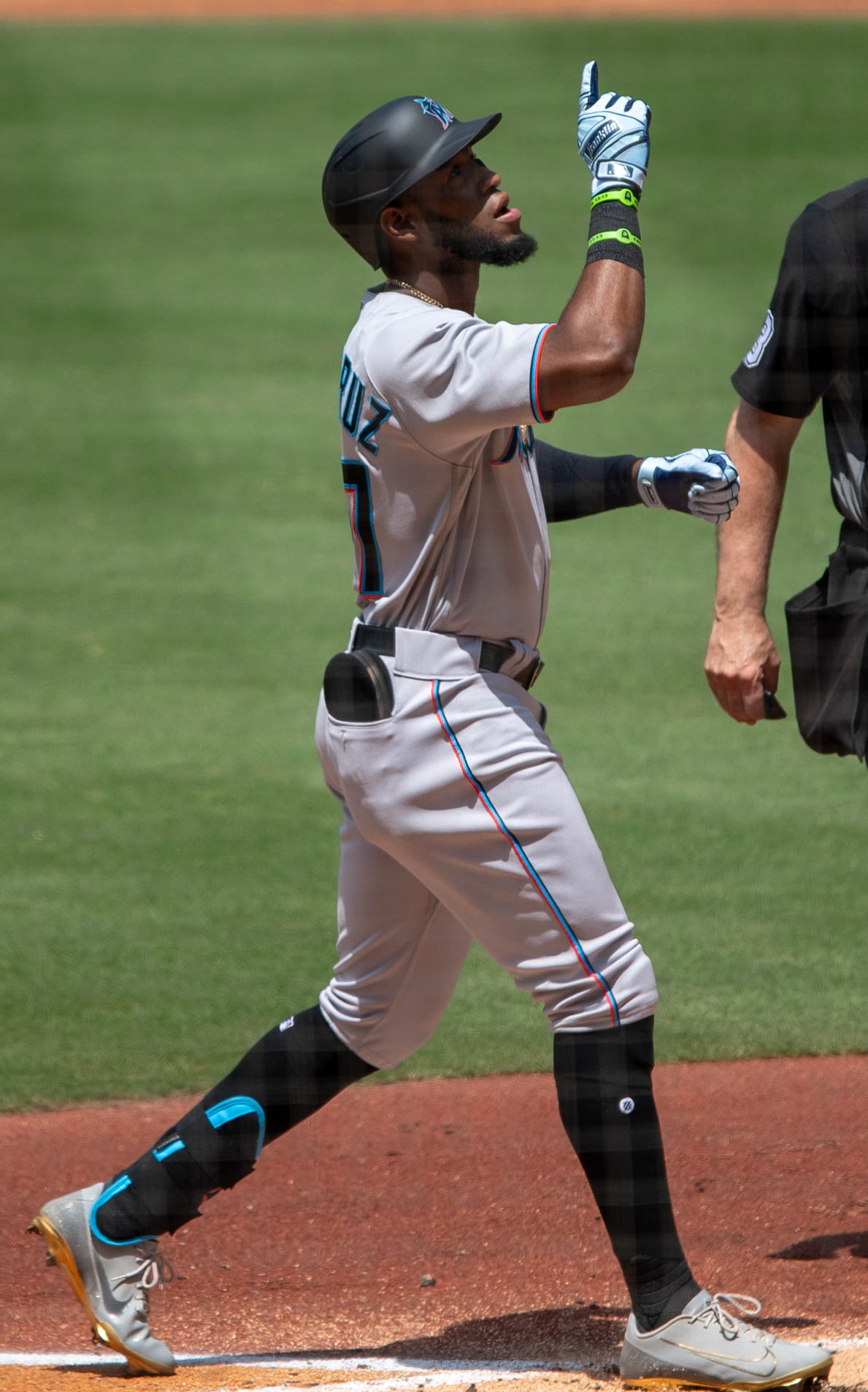
- De La Cruz with the Marlins in 2021

Free agent
- Outfielder
- Born: December 16, 1996 (age 29); Santo Domingo Este, Dominican Republic
- Bats: Right Throws: Right

MLB debut
- July 30, 2021, for the Miami Marlins

MLB statistics (through 2026 season)
- Batting average: .252
- Home runs: 60
- Runs batted in: 220
- Stats at Baseball Reference

Teams
- Miami Marlins (2021–2024); Pittsburgh Pirates (2024); Atlanta Braves (2025); Philadelphia Phillies (2026)

Bryan Starling De La Cruz (born December 16, 1996) is a Dominican professional baseball outfielder who is a free agent. He has previously played in Major League Baseball (MLB) for the Miami Marlins, Pittsburgh Pirates, Atlanta Braves, and Philadelphia Phillies. De La Cruz signed with the Houston Astros as an international free agent in 2013, and made his MLB debut in 2021 with the Marlins.

== Career ==
=== Houston Astros ===
De La Cruz signed with the Houston Astros organization as an international free agent on September 24, 2013, for a $170,000 signing bonus. He spent his professional debut season with the Dominican Summer League Astros, hitting 262/.387/.317 with one home run and 22 runs batted in (RBI). His 2015 season was spent with the Gulf Coast League Astros, hitting .242/.313/.268 with 12 RBI. He split the 2016 season between the Greeneville Astros and the Tri-City ValleyCats, hitting a combined .239/.331/.396 with three home runs and 18 RBI. He split the 2017 season between Tri-City, the Quad Cities River Bandits and the Corpus Christi Hooks, hitting a combined .244/.290/.335 with two home runs and 21 RBI.

In the 2018 season, De La Cruz played for Quad Cities and the Buies Creek Astros, hitting a combined .289/.367/.375 with two home runs and 62 RBI. De La Cruz split the 2019 season between the Fayetteville Woodpeckers and Corpus Christi, hitting a combined .280/.340/.428 with eight home runs and 43 RBI. De La Cruz did not play in a game in 2020 due to the cancellation of the Minor League Baseball season because of the COVID-19 pandemic. He opened the 2021 season with the Sugar Land Skeeters, hitting .324/.362/.518 with 12 home runs and 50 RBI over 66 games with them.

=== Miami Marlins ===
On July 28, 2021, the Astros traded De La Cruz and Austin Pruitt to the Miami Marlins in exchange for Yimi García. On July 30, Miami selected his contract and promoted him to the major leagues. He made his MLB debut that night against the New York Yankees. On August 13, De La Cruz hit his first career grand slam off of Chicago Cubs starter Adbert Alzolay. In 58 games during his rookie campaign, he batted .296 with five home runs and 19 RBI.

De La Cruz made the Marlins' Opening Day roster for the 2022 season. He played in a 115 games for Miami during the season, slashing .252/.294/.432 with 13 home runs and 43 RBI. De La Cruz made 153 appearances for the Marlins during the 2023 campaign, batting .257/.304/.411 with career–highs in home runs (19) and RBI (78).

De La Cruz played in 105 contests for Miami in 2024, hitting .245/.289/.417 with 18 home runs, 51 RBI, and three stolen bases. At the time of his trade, he was the Marlins' season leader in home runs and RBI.

=== Pittsburgh Pirates ===
On July 30, 2024, the Marlins traded De La Cruz to the Pittsburgh Pirates in exchange for Jun-Seok Shim and Garret Forrester. In 44 games for Pittsburgh, he slashed .200/.220/.294 with three home runs, 17 RBI, and two stolen bases. On November 22, the Pirates non–tendered De La Cruz, making him a free agent.

=== Atlanta Braves ===
On December 15, 2024, De La Cruz signed a one–year, major league contract with the Atlanta Braves. De La Cruz made 16 appearances for Atlanta in 2025, batting .191/.240/.213 with one stolen base.

=== New York Yankees ===
On May 1, 2025, De La Cruz was claimed off waivers by the New York Yankees; he was subsequently assigned to the Triple-A Scranton/Wilkes-Barre RailRiders. He was designated for assignment by the Yankees on July 31. De La Cruz cleared waivers and was sent outright to Scranton on August 3. On October 10, De La Cruz elected free agency.

=== Philadelphia Phillies ===
On November 6, 2025, De La Cruz signed a minor league contract with the Philadelphia Phillies. On July 4, 2026, De La Cruz was released by the Phillies organization. He re-signed with Philadelphia on a major league contract the following day, and was optioned to the Triple-A Lehigh Valley IronPigs. On November 20, 2026, De La Cruz was non-tendered by the Phillies and became a free agent.
