= Gulf Coast League White Sox =

- (1964-1977, 1980-1997); Sarasota, Florida

Minor league affiliations
- Previous classes: Rookie
- Previous leagues: Gulf Coast League (1966-1977, 1980-1997); Florida Rookie League (1965); Sarasota Rookie League (1964)

Major league affiliations
- Previous teams: Chicago White Sox

Minor league titles
- League titles (2): 1970; 1977
- Division titles (3): 1970; 1977; 1984

Team data
- Name: GCL White Sox (1966-1977, 1980-1997); FRL White Sox (1965); SRL White Sox (1964)
- Previous names: Florida Rookie League White Sox (1965); Sarasota Rookie League White Sox (1964)
- Ballpark: Ed Smith Stadium (1989-1997); Payne Park (1964-1988)

The GCL White Sox were a Gulf Coast League minor league baseball team that played from 1966 to 1977 and from 1980 to 1997. The club was affiliated with the Chicago White Sox.

They won two league championships, in 1970 and 1977 - both under manager Joe Jones.
