= Rod Carew =

American baseball player/coach (born 1945)

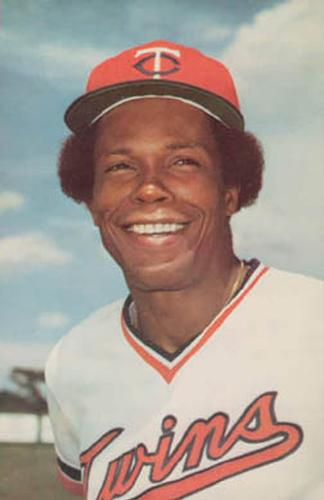
- Carew with the Minnesota Twins in 1978
- Second baseman / First baseman
- Born: October 1, 1945 (age 81); Gatún, Panama Canal Zone
- Batted: Left Threw: Right

MLB debut
- April 11, 1967, for the Minnesota Twins

Last MLB appearance
- October 5, 1985, for the California Angels

MLB statistics
- Batting average: .328
- Hits: 3,053
- Home runs: 92
- Runs batted in: 1,015
- Stats at Baseball Reference

Teams
- As player: Minnesota Twins (1967–1978); California Angels (1979–1985); As coach: California / Anaheim Angels (1992–1999); Milwaukee Brewers (2000–2001)

Career highlights and awards
- 18× All-Star (1967–1984); AL MVP (1977); AL Rookie of the Year (1967); Roberto Clemente Award (1977); 7× AL batting champion (1969, 1972–1975, 1977, 1978); Minnesota Twins No. 29 retired; Los Angeles Angels No. 29 retired; Minnesota Twins Hall of Fame; Angels Hall of Fame

Member of the National

Baseball Hall of Fame
- Induction: 1991
- Vote: 90.5% (first ballot)

Rodney Cline Carew (born October 1, 1945) is an Panamanian-American former professional baseball player and coach. He played in Major League Baseball (MLB) as a second baseman, first baseman and designated hitter from 1967 to 1985 for the Minnesota Twins and the California Angels. The most accomplished contact hitter in Twins history, he won the 1977 AL Most Valuable Player Award, setting a Twins record with a .388 batting average. Carew appeared in 18 consecutive All-Star Games and led the AL in hits three times, with his 239 hits in 1977 ranking as the 12th most in a season at the time and the 16th most as of 2024, tied with Willie Keeler's 239 hits from 1897. He won seven AL batting titles, the second most AL batting titles in history behind Ty Cobb, and on July 12, 2016, the AL batting title was renamed the Rod Carew American League batting title.

In 1977, Carew was named the recipient of the prestigious Roberto Clemente Award for his involvement in local community affairs. On August 4, 1985, he became the 16th member of the 3,000 hit club with a single to left field off Frank Viola. His 3,053 hits are 27th all time, and his career batting average of .328 is 34th all time. He was elected to the National Baseball Hall of Fame in 1991 in his first year of eligibility; he appeared on upwards of 90 percent of the ballots. He was also elected to the Caribbean Baseball Hall of Fame, Minnesota Twins Hall of Fame, and Angels Hall of Fame. After retiring as a player, Carew served as a coach for the Angels and the Milwaukee Brewers.

== Early life ==
Carew is the son of Olga Teoma and Eric Carew Sr., a painter. Carew is a Zonian and was born to a Panamanian mother on a train in the town of Gatún, which at that time was in the Panama Canal Zone. The train was racially segregated; white passengers were given the better forward cars, while non-whites, like Carew's mother, were forced to ride in the rearward cars. Traveling on the train was Dr. Rodney Cline, who delivered the baby. In appreciation for this, Mrs. Carew named the boy Rodney Cline Carew. Carew later acknowledged in 2020 that he and his father Eric had a very tumultuous relationship, even stating "Baseball was the one thing that kept me from killing my father." In his memoir One Tough Out, Carew stated that his father was a violent alcoholic who would often physically abuse him and his mother, and that Carew eventually came close to killing him with a machete.

At age 14, Carew and his siblings immigrated to the United States to join his mother in the Washington Heights section of the borough of Manhattan, New York City. Although Carew attended George Washington High School, he never played baseball for the high school team. According to Carew, his interest in baseball redeveloped at the age of 18; it had initially developed when he was younger and still in Panama, where his mother convinced him he could get away from his father if he played baseball. Carew later played semi-professional baseball for the Bronx Cavaliers, which is where he was discovered by Minnesota Twins scout Monroe Katz (whose son, Steve, played with Carew on the Cavaliers). Katz then recommended Carew to another Twins scout, Herb Stein, who arranged a tryout in April 1964, where Carew performed so well that manager Sam Mele finished the tryout early so that the Yankees would not see him. Herb Stein along with Katz signed Carew to an amateur free agent contract (at the Stella D'Oro Restaurant in the Bronx) on June 24, 1964 for a monthly salary of $400 (equivalent to $4,152 in 2025).

Starting his minor league career, Carew was assigned to play second base with the Melbourne Twins in the Cocoa Rookie League and hit .325 over the final 37 games of the season. Over the next two years he would end up hitting .302 in Class A playing second base for the Wilson Tobs and the Orlando Twins.

== Major league career ==
=== Minnesota Twins ===
In the top of the second inning on April 11, 1967, at Memorial Stadium against the Baltimore Orioles, Carew hit a single for his first major league hit in his first plate appearance; he would finish the game going 2–4. A few weeks later, against the Washington Senators, Carew went 5–5 with a double and a stolen base for the first 5–hit game of his career. He was elected to the first of his 18 consecutive All-Star game appearances and won the American League (AL) Rookie of the Year award, receiving 19 of 20 first-place votes. In a game against the Detroit Tigers at Metropolitan Stadium on May 18, 1969, Cesar Tovar led off the bottom of the third with a single. With Carew at bat, pitcher Mickey Lolich balked and Tovar moved to second base, then stole third. Carew walked, then executed a double steal with Tovar as Tovar stole home and Carew stole second. Carew then stole third base, followed by a steal of home. This marked the 41st time in Major League history and the 20th time in AL history that a runner had stolen every base in an inning. Carew stole home seven times in 1969, leading the major leagues in this category and just missing Ty Cobb's record of eight. Carew's seven steals of home in 1969 was the most in the majors since Pete Reiser stole seven for the Brooklyn Dodgers in 1946. Manager Billy Martin had worked with Carew throughout the 1969 season to learn how to steal home, and teammate Sandy Valdespino had taught Carew how to bunt more effectively. At the end of the season, he led the AL with a .332 batting average, while the second-place finisher, Reggie Smith, had a .309 average.

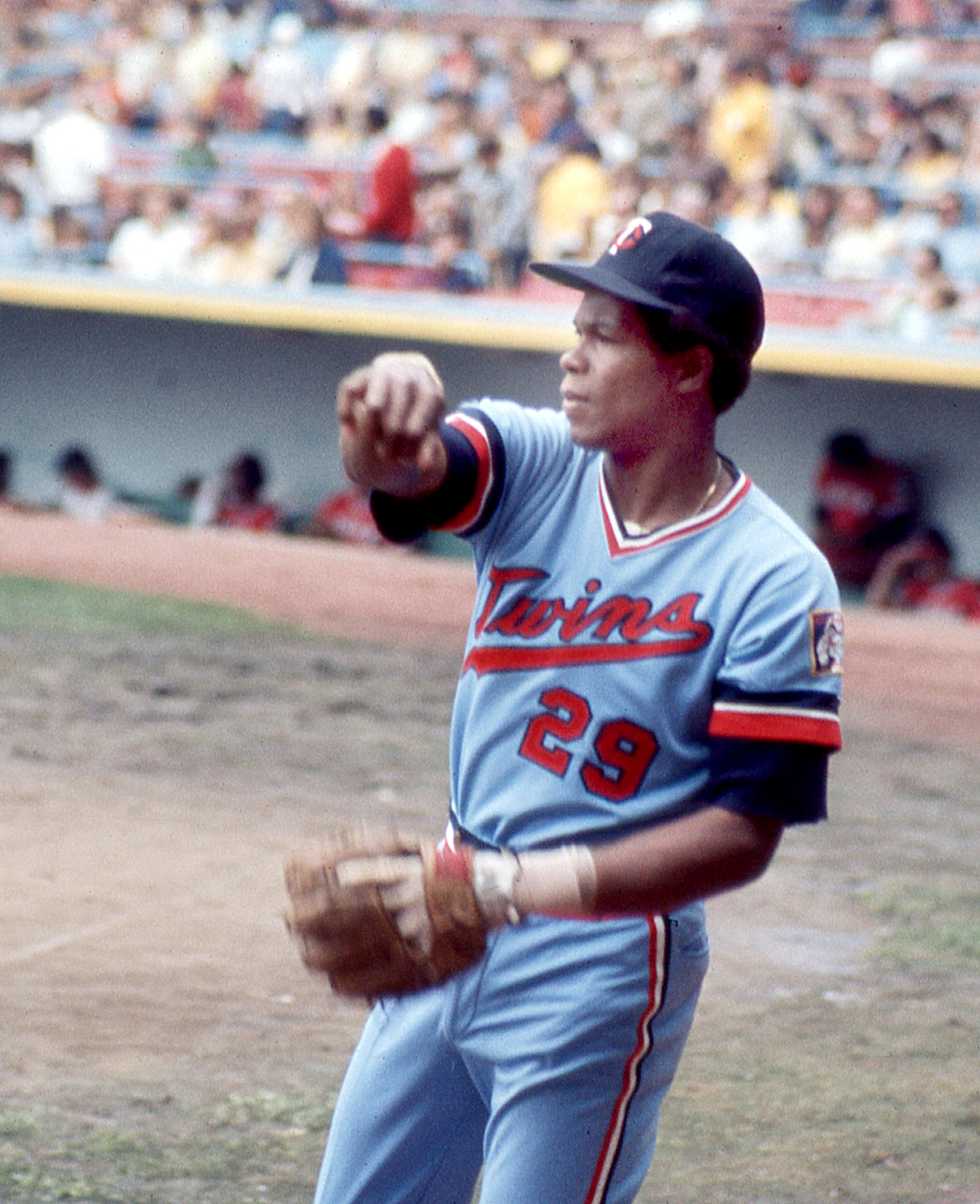
Carew with the Minnesota Twins warming up before a game in Cleveland in 1975

Carew hit for the cycle on May 20, 1970, against the Kansas City Royals, going 4–5 with a stolen base; this was the first cycle hit by a member of the Twins. On June 22, he was injured at second base attempting to convert a double play. He had surgery to repair ligaments in his left leg and missed 92 games. In 1972, Carew led the AL in batting, hitting .318; he had no home runs for the only time in his career. This was the first time since 1918, when Zack Wheat won the National League batting championship, that a player won the batting title with no home runs.

The start of the 1973 season was slow. Carew was hitting only .246 by the end of April. Carew performed well during the summer months, including a 5-hit performance on August 14. By the end of September, he was back in the major league lead with a .353 average. When the season concluded he won his third batting title with a major league-leading .350 batting average. His 203 hits and 11 triples also led the AL. The next season, Carew had his best year to date; from his first at bat on April 5 against the Kansas City Royals, his average was never below .300 the entire year. Through June 27, he was batting .400, but cooled off near the end of the season. His 213 hits were a career high and led the majors, and he collected his fourth career batting title with a .364 average.

In 1975, Carew won his fourth consecutive AL batting title. He joined Ty Cobb as the only players to lead the major leagues in batting average for three consecutive seasons. After seeing time predominantly at second base up to this point, Carew moved to first base in September 1975 and stayed there for the rest of his career. Carew missed out on winning another batting title in 1976 as his .331 average was only .002 behind league leader George Brett. Carew still collected career highs in games played (156) and stolen bases (49), and had 200 hits for the third time in his career. He became the first player to steal 40 bases while predominantly playing first base in a season since George Sisler in 1922.

In the 1977 season, Carew batted .388, which was the highest since Boston's Ted Williams hit .388 in 1957; he won the 1977 AL Most Valuable Player (MVP) Award. He also set career highs with 239 hits (at that time the most by any player since 1930), 100 RBIs and 128 runs scored. In the summer of 1977, Carew appeared on the cover of Time with the caption "Baseball's Best Hitter". He won his seventh and final batting title in 1978 when he hit .333. He had finished in the top 15 in AL MVP voting in every season between 1972 and 1978.

=== California Angels ===
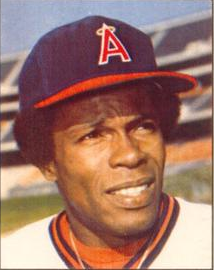
Carew with the Angels.

In 1979, allegedly frustrated by the Twins' inability to keep young talent, some racist comments by Calvin Griffith, and the Twins' overall penny-pinching negotiating style, Carew announced his intention to leave the Twins. On February 3, Carew was traded to the Angels for outfielder Ken Landreaux, catcher/first baseman Dave Engle, right-handed pitcher Paul Hartzell, and left-handed pitcher Brad Havens. Although it would have represented an infusion of talent, the Twins were unable to complete a possibly better deal with the New York Yankees in January in which Carew would have moved to the Yankees in exchange for Chris Chambliss, Juan Beníquez, Dámaso García, and Dave Righetti. In 2020, Carew denied the longtime allegations that the controversial comments which Griffith made in 1978 suggesting support for Minnesota having a low African-American population and the idea that blacks preferred wrestling to baseball was what triggered his trade to the Angels when he stated, "When he traded me prior to the 1979 season, Calvin told me he wanted me to be paid what I was worth. Later that year the Angels made me the highest paid player in baseball. A racist wouldn't have done that."

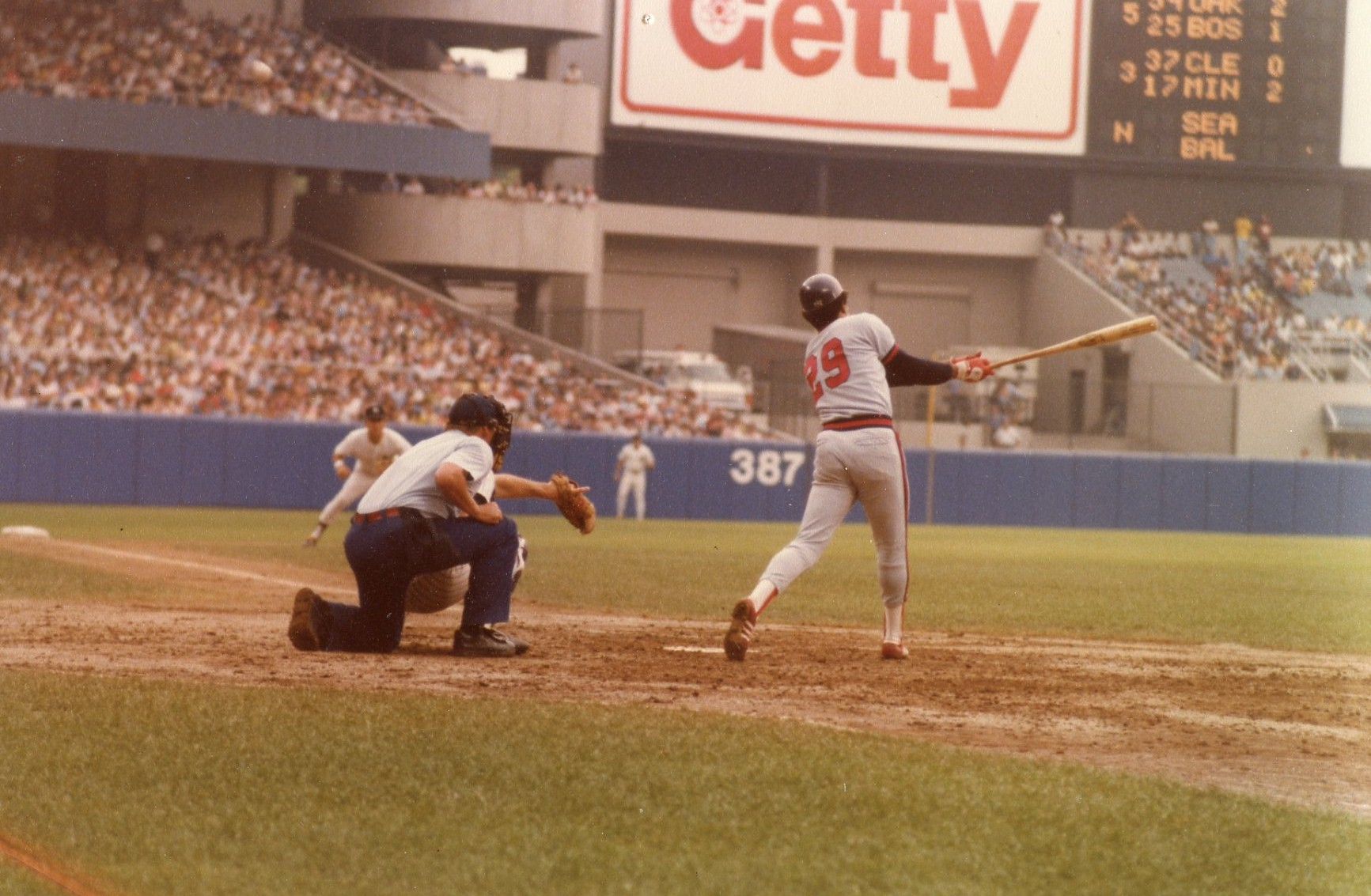
Carew bats at Yankee Stadium in 1979.

Though Carew did not win a batting title after 1978, he hit between .305 and .339 from 1979 to 1983. In 1982, Carew broke his hand early in the season. Newspaper reports characterized him as swinging one-handed that season due to pain, but he put together a 25-game hitting streak at one point in the season. He played in 138 games that year and hit .319. The Angels went to the playoffs in 1982, which was Carew's fourth and final appearance in postseason play. The team lost a five-game series (three games to two) to the Milwaukee Brewers. Carew played in all five games, but he hit .176 (three hits in 17 at-bats). Carew grounded out to end the fifth and final game by hitting a routine groundball to shortstop Robin Yount off a pitch from Pete Ladd, a minor-league journeyman who replaced the injured Brewers closer Rollie Fingers.

On August 4, 1985, Carew joined an elite group of ballplayers when he got his 3,000th base hit against Minnesota Twins left-hander Frank Viola at the former Anaheim Stadium. The 1985 season was his last. After the season, Rod Carew was granted free agency, after the Angels declined to offer him a new contract. He received an offer from the Boston Red Sox to be their minor league hitting instructor. His only offer to continue his playing career in 1986 was from the San Francisco Giants. He declined the offer and opted to retire. Carew suspected that baseball owners were colluding to keep him (and other players) from signing. On January 10, 1995, nearly a decade after his forced retirement, arbitrator Thomas Roberts ruled that the owners had violated the rules of baseball's second collusion agreement. Carew was awarded damages equivalent to what he would have likely received in 1986: $782,035.71. Carew finished his career with 3,053 hits and a lifetime batting average of .328.

Through 2017, Carew still holds many places in the Twins record books, including: highest career batting average (.334), second-highest on-base percentage (.393, tied with Buddy Myer), fourth-highest in intentional walks (99), fifth in hits (2,085), and fifth in stolen bases (271). He also holds many spots in the Angels record books, including: highest career on-base percentage (.393), second-highest batting average (.314), and sixth-highest in both intentional walks (45) and sacrifice hits (60). Carew's career total of 17 steals of home ties him for 17th on the all-time MLB list with former New York Giant MVP Larry Doyle and fellow Hall of Famer Eddie Collins.

=== Career statistics ===
In 2,469 games over 19 seasons, Carew posted a .328 batting average (3,053-for-9,315) with 1,424 runs, 445 doubles, 112 triples, 92 home runs, 1,015 RBI, 353 stolen bases, 1,018 bases on balls, .393 on-base percentage and .429 slugging percentage. Defensively, he recorded a .985 fielding percentage playing at first and second base. In 14 ALCS games, he hit .220 (11-for-50) with 6 runs, 4 doubles, 1 RBI, 2 stolen bases and 5 walks. He also had a batting average of .300 or higher in 15 consecutive seasons (1969-1983). Carew recorded 7 five-hit games and 51 four-hit games in his 19-year MLB career. Carew was also an effective pinch hitter in his career, recording a .315 batting average (40-for-127) with 3 home runs and 33 RBI in that role.

== Outside baseball ==
=== Military service ===
Starting in 1966, Carew served a six-year commitment in the United States Marine Corps Reserve as a combat engineer. He later said that his military experience helped him in his baseball career. Carew said, "When I joined the Marine Corps, it was a life-changing event for me because I learned about discipline. When I first came up to the big leagues in 1967, I was a little bit of a hothead. But after two weeks of war games every summer, I realized that baseball was not do-or-die. That kind of discipline made me the player I became."

=== Confusion over conversion to Judaism ===
There is no evidence that Carew ever formally converted to Judaism, although he wore a chai necklace during his playing days. His first wife, Marilynn Levy, is Jewish, and he was a member of Temple Beth Shalom in Santa Ana, California. Their three daughters, Charryse, Stephanie, and Michelle, were raised in the Jewish tradition and had their bat mitzvahs there. When one daughter, Michelle, died of leukemia at age 18, services were held at Beth Shalom, and she was buried in the family plot at the United Hebrew Brotherhood Cemetery in Richfield, Minnesota, a suburb of Minneapolis, where Rod Carew played for the Minnesota Twins. Carew, however, still identified as Episcopalian during their relationship.

A 2007 Salon article named Carew one of the 18 best Jewish ballplayers of all time; the article clarified that Carew was not Jewish but commended him for raising his children in the faith and for marrying Levy in spite of death threats he received. Carew and Levy, who began their relationship in 1968, were married in 1970 and divorced in 2000.

Another source propagating the story is "The Chanukah Song", written and performed by Adam Sandler in 1994. The tune (which quickly became a holiday perennial) lists famous Jews of the 20th century: "...O. J. Simpson... not a Jew! But guess who is: Hall of Famer Rod Carew! He converted!" Carew later wrote Sandler and explained the situation, adding that he thought the song was "pretty funny". (Sandler dropped Carew from later versions of the song, but Neil Diamond mentions the ballplayer in his rendition, recorded in 2009.)

== After retirement ==
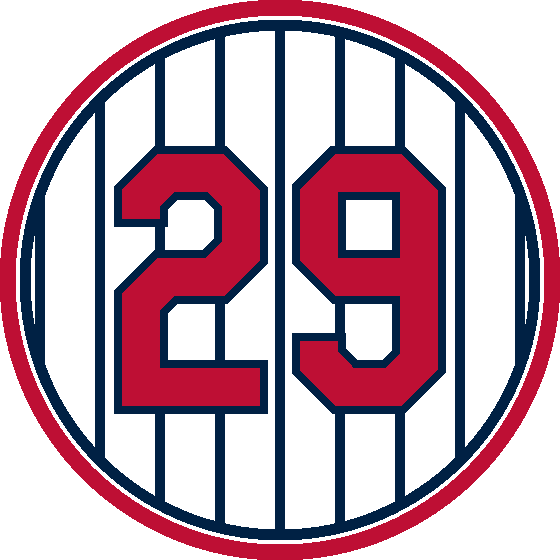
Rod Carew's number 29 was retired by the Minnesota Twins in 1987.

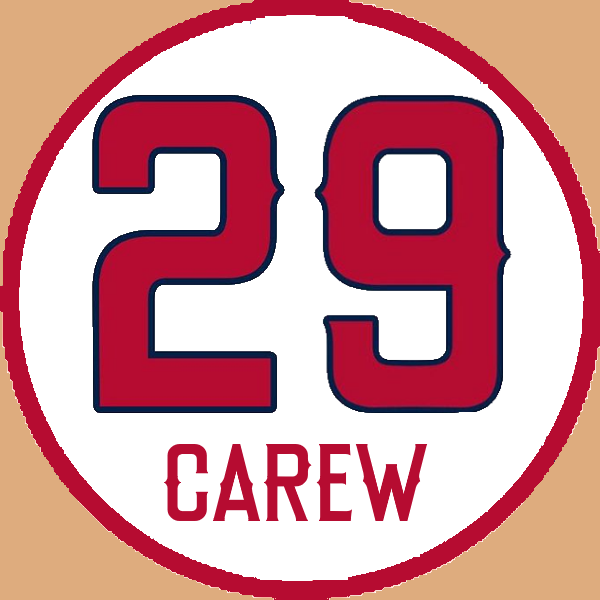
Rod Carew's number 29 was retired by the California Angels in 1986.

Carew moved to the community of Anaheim Hills, California, while playing with the Angels and remained there after his retirement. Carew was hired as the Angels' hitting coach on November 5, 1991, and served in a similar capacity with the Milwaukee Brewers. He is credited with helping develop young hitters like Garret Anderson, Jim Edmonds, and Tim Salmon. Carew has also worked at various times as a minor league and spring training hitting and base running coach for the Twins and serves as an international youth baseball instructor for Major League Baseball.

Carew married his second wife Rhonda in December 2001; she has two children, Cheyenne and Devon. Devout Christians, the family attends Saddleback Church in Lake Forest, California.

On January 19, 2004, Panama City's National Stadium was renamed "Rod Carew Stadium". In 2005, Carew was named the second baseman on the Major League Baseball Latino Legends Team.

Carew's number 29 was retired by the Twins on July 19, 1987, and by the Angels in 1986. Carew was the fourth inductee into the Angels' Hall of Fame on August 6, 1991. Carew was elected to the Baseball Hall of Fame in 1991, his first year of eligibility, the 22nd player so elected; he went into the Hall with a Twins cap. In 1999, he ranked #61 on The Sporting News' list of 100 Greatest Baseball Players, and was nominated as a finalist for Major League Baseball's All-Century Team. Carew was inducted into the Hispanic Heritage Baseball Museum Hall of Fame in 2010.

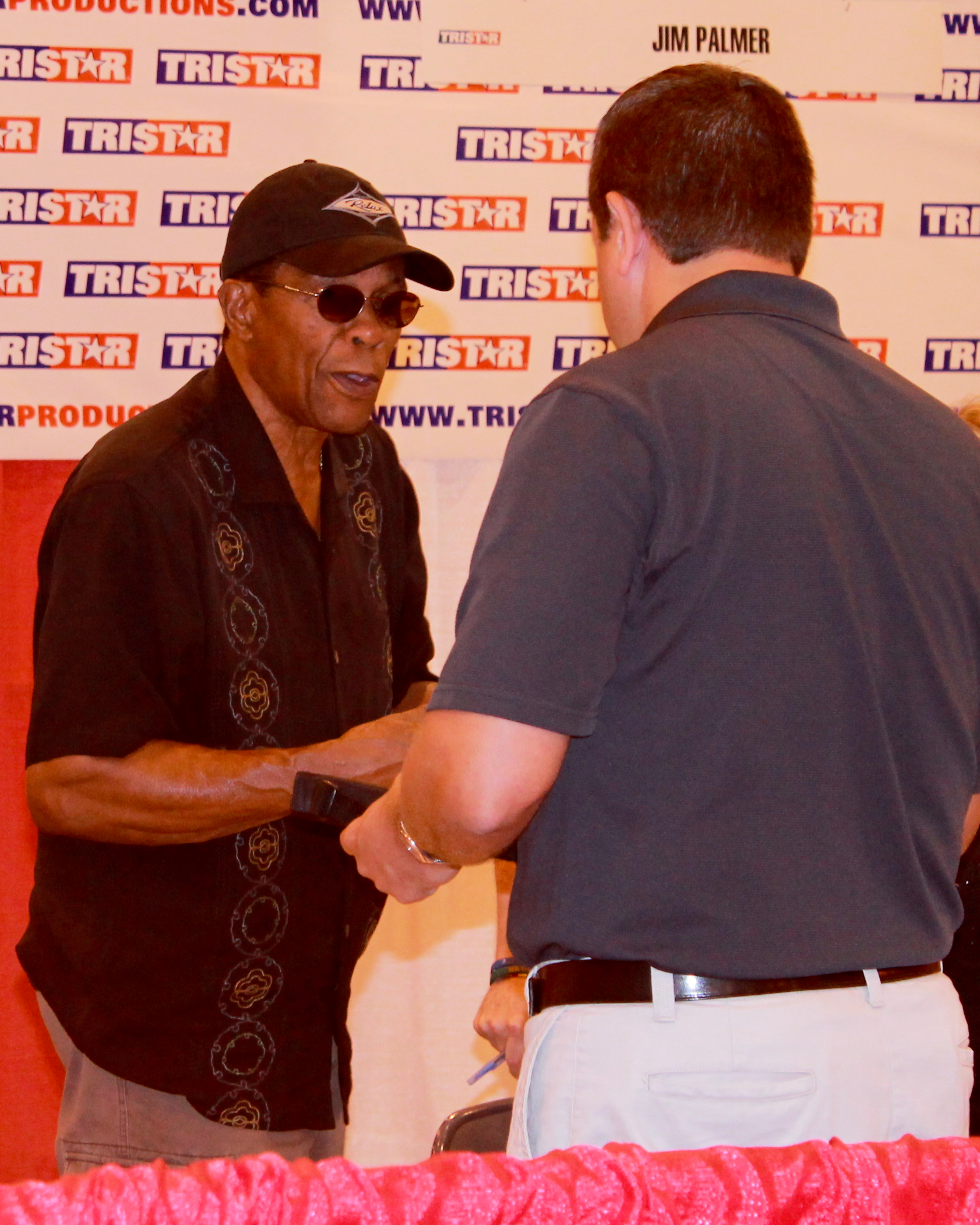
Carew (left) talks to a fan in May 2014.

Carew has three biological children from his first marriage—Charryse, Stephanie, and Michelle. In September 1995, his youngest of three daughters, Michelle, was diagnosed with acute myeloid leukemia, a relatively rare leukemia for a young person. Doctors wanted to perform a bone marrow transplant, but Michelle's rare ethnic heritage complicated the search for a matching donor; her father was black with West Indian and Panamanian roots and her mother was of Russian-Jewish ancestry. Carew pleaded for those of similar ethnic background to come forward. When no matching bone marrow donor was found, an umbilical cord blood transplant was performed in March 1996. Michelle died on April 17, 1996, at the age of 18. A statue of her has been installed in Angel Stadium of Anaheim.

Carew began using chewing tobacco in 1964 and was a regular user up to 1992, when a cancerous growth in his mouth was discovered and removed. The years of use had severely damaged his teeth and gums, and Carew has spent a reported $100,000 in restorative dental work.

In September 2015, Carew suffered a massive heart attack while on a California golf course. He was hospitalized for more than six weeks, and had several surgical procedures, which culminated with implantation of a left ventricular assist device (LVAD). Carew recovered sufficiently to take part in the Twins' 2016 spring training as an instructor, coach, and launched the Heart of 29 Campaign. Further, Carew became involved in the branding and launching of a Left Ventricular Assist Device wear company, Carew Medical Wear. In February 2016, Carew indicated that his doctors informed him that he would eventually need a heart transplant. The transplant was done on December 15, 2016. Carew's transplanted heart was donated by former Baltimore Ravens tight end Konrad Reuland, who passed away after an aneurysm had suddenly burst. Reuland was just 29 years old. Carew played his 19 MLB seasons with the number “29”, a connection that his wife, Rhonda Carew, called “God winks”. Reuland had attended middle school with Carew's children and was 11 years old when he got to meet Carew at his school. Carew had been Reuland’s favorite athlete, across all sports, and gleefully told his mom, after meeting Carew, “You know, he was a pro athlete! You know, I want to be a pro athlete!”. Reuland’s mom said Carew left quite an impression on her son. Reuland later became a high school athlete in baseball, as well as basketball and football. Carew participated in the 2018 Rose Parade aboard the Donate Life float on New Year's Day, in honor of Reuland.

In a pre-game ceremony before the 2016 MLB All Star Game in San Diego, the American League batting championship trophy was named the Rod Carew American League Batting Championship Award.

In 2016, Rod Carew was awarded the Bob Feller Act of Valor Award.

On August 23, 2024, Carew became a citizen of the United States.

== See also ==
- List of Major League Baseball career hits leaders
- List of Major League Baseball career doubles leaders
- List of Major League Baseball career triples leaders
- List of Major League Baseball career runs scored leaders
- List of Major League Baseball career runs batted in leaders
- List of Major League Baseball career stolen bases leaders
- 3,000 hit club
- List of Major League Baseball players to hit for the cycle
- List of Major League Baseball batting champions
- List of Major League Baseball annual runs scored leaders
- List of Major League Baseball annual triples leaders
- DHL Hometown Heroes
- Hispanics in the United States Marine Corps

Preceded by Wes Parker	Hitting for the cycle May 20, 1970	Succeeded by Tony Horton
