= Jun-Seok Shim =

South Korean baseball player (born 2004)

New York Mets
- Pitcher
- Born: April 9, 2004 (age 22); Seongnam, Gyeonggi Province, South Korea
- Bats: Right Throws: Right

Jun-Seok Shim (Korean: 심준석; born April 9, 2004) is a South Korean professional baseball pitcher in the New York Mets organization.

== Amateur career ==
Shim attended Duksoo High School in Seoul, South Korea. In 2020, he went 4–1 with a 1.42 ERA and 32 strikeouts over 19 innings pitched. Shim suffered an elbow injury that hampered his 2021 season. He struggled with a back injury in 2022 and pitched 20 2/3 innings over 12 appearances, posting a 5.14 ERA with 40 strikeouts and 22 walks. Shim did not apply for the 2022 Korea Baseball Organization Draft and hired agent Scott Boras to focus on being signed by a Major League Baseball (MLB) team as an international free agent.

== Professional career ==
=== Pittsburgh Pirates ===
Shim was signed by the Pittsburgh Pirates organization on January 26, 2023, and received a $750,000 signing bonus. He began the 2023 season in extended spring training. Shim was later assigned to the Rookie-level Florida Complex League Pirates, where he recorded a 3.38 ERA with 13 strikeouts over eight innings pitched.

Shim was placed on the injured list to begin the 2024 campaign due to a shoulder injury, which ultimately caused him to miss the entirety of the season.

=== Miami Marlins ===
On July 30, 2024, the Pirates traded Shim and Garret Forrester to the Miami Marlins in exchange for Bryan De La Cruz. He did not appear for the organization in 2024 following his acquisition. Shim played in the Arizona Fall League for the Peoria Javelinas during the offseason, but struggled to a 19.80 ERA with five strikeouts over five innings of work.

Shim made 13 appearances for the rookie-level Florida Complex League Marlins in 2025, but struggled to an 0–3 record and 10.80 ERA with 16 strikeouts and one save across 13 1/3 innings pitched. Shim was released by the Marlins organization on August 4, 2025.

=== New York Mets ===
On December 29, 2025, Shim signed a minor league contract with the New York Mets.
