= List of Florida Complex League team rosters =

Below are the full rosters and coaching staff of the 15 teams of Minor League Baseball's Florida Complex League.

== Florida Complex League Astros ==
Florida Complex League Astros roster
Players		Coaches/Other
Pitchers: -- Reimy Beltre; 78 Jesus Carrera; 41 Anthony Cruz; -- Ryan Forcucci; 35 Francisco Frias; 57 Franklin Gil; 39 Rafael Gonzalez; 70 David Landeta; -- Eurys Martich; -- Leomar Rosario; 38 Jose Varela	Catchers: 20 Carlos Cauro; -- Arturo Flores; 79 Andrews Sosa; 21 Kedaur Trujillo; Infielders: 6 Darwin De Leon; 93 Alberto Hernandez; 97 Waner Luciano; 11 German Ramirez; Outfielders: -- Jose Gonzalez; 10 Karniel Pratt; 14 Luis Rives; 16 Esmil Valencia	Manager: 12 Carlos Lugo; Coaches: -- Kyle Brennan (hitting); 22 Alfredo Granier (development); 72 Taylor Jones (hitting); 15 James Wiseman (pitching); 60-day injured list: 44 Antony Aparicio; -- Joey Dixon; 50 Jorge Geraldo (full season); 7-day injured list * On Houston Astros 40-man roster ~ Development list # Rehab assignment ∞ Reserve list ‡ Restricted list § Suspended list † Temporarily inactive list Roster updated March 20, 2025; Transactions → More rosters: MiLB • Florida Complex League → Houston Astros minor league players

== Florida Complex League Blue Jays ==
Florida Complex League Blue Jays roster
Players		Coaches/Other
Pitchers: 72 Austin Cates; 77 Javen Coleman; 24 Evan Elliott; 76 Jack Eshleman; 51 Troy Guthrie; -- Silvano Hechavarria; 79 Logan Hewitt; 48 Johnny King; 56 Carson Messina; -- Sann Omosako; 41 Lluveres Severino; 45 Johan Simon; 57 Khal Stephen; -- Franly Urena; -- Juanmi Vasquez; 53 Holden Wilkerson; 82 Trey Yesavage	Catchers: 70 Hayden Gilliland; 19 Luis Meza; 52 Maykel Minoso; 64 Peyton Powell; Infielders: 10 Kendry Chirinos; -- Jose Fernandez; 49 Owen Gregg; 89 Drew Jemison; 40 Jacob Lojewski; 44 Sam Shaw; 5 Gavin Smith; Outfielders: 15 Enmanuel Bonilla; 8 David Guzman; 94 Jean Joseph; 35 Yeuni Munoz; 27 Railin Tejada	Manager: 6 Andy Fermin; Coaches: 99 Antonio Caceres (pitching); 59 Paul Elliott (hitting); 44 Brendan Kelly (pitching); 31 Fred Landers (hitting); 18 Chris Schaeffer (bench); 7-day injured list * On Toronto Blue Jays 40-man roster ~ Development list # Rehab assignment ∞ Reserve list ‡ Restricted list § Suspended list † Temporarily inactive list Roster updated November 3, 2024; Transactions → More rosters: MiLB • Florida Complex League → Toronto Blue Jays minor league players

== Florida Complex League Braves ==
Florida Complex League Braves roster
Players		Coaches/Other
Pitchers: 37 Zack Austin; -- Jackson Dannelley; 34 Whilmer Guerra; -- Herick Hernandez; -- Tyler LaPorte; -- Justin Long; -- Adam Maier; 79 Justin Militello; 67 Marco Patino; 75 Yorvi Pirela; -- Luke Sinnard; 76 Jhonly Taveras	Catchers: -- Nick Clarno; -- Will King; 63 Alexander Martinez; -- Nick Montgomery; 17 Josnaider Orellana; 2 Luis Parababire; Infielders: 85 Carlos Arroyo; 9 Mario Baez; 65 Diego Benitez; -- Leiker Figueroa; 59 Roiber Niazoa; 19 Angel Nieblas; Outfielders: 66 John Estevez; 68 Douglas Glod; 64 Robert Gonzalez; 83 Carlos Monteverde; 99 Alex Verdugo	Manager: 4 Nestor Pérez; Coaches: 23 Tyler Dalton (pitching); 38 Carlos Méndez (hitting); 30 Horacio Ramírez (pitching); 1 Ben Revere (coach); 12 Stevie Wilkerson (hitting); 60-day injured list: 82 Cristobal Abreu; -- Styven Paez; -- Derek Vartanian; 7-day injured list * On Atlanta Braves 40-man roster ~ Development list # Rehab assignment ∞ Reserve list ‡ Restricted list § Suspended list † Temporarily inactive list Roster updated March 26, 2025; Transactions → More rosters: MiLB • Florida Complex League → Atlanta Braves minor league players

== Florida Complex League Cardinals ==
Florida Complex League Cardinals roster
Players		Coaches/Other
Pitchers: 27 Yadiel Batista; -- Sam Broderson; -- Mason Burns; 36 Antoni Cuello; 58 Samuel Fabian; 51 Jovi Galvez; 13 Charles Harrison; 31 Yordy Herrera; -- Brian Holiday; -- Joseph King; 38 Bruno Lopez; -- Austin Love; 18 Miguel Martinez; 57 Ruben Menes; 16 Jacob Odle; 28 Ronny Oliver; 35 Juan Severino; -- Alec Willis; -- Cade Winquest; 64 Christian Worley	Catchers: -- Alejandro Loaiza; 26 Chris Lopez; 49 Luis Rodriguez; Infielders: 3 Arfeni Batista; 8 Yancel Guerrero; 29 Jonathan Mejia; Outfielders: 19 Romtres Cabrera; -- Travis Honeyman; 40 Yordalin Pena; 52 Luis Pino; 5 Yaisel Ramos	Manager: -- Willi Martin; Coaches: 50 Erick Almonte (hitting); -- Rich Benjamin (bench); 62 Dernier Orozco (pitching); -- Will Peterson (bench); 7-day injured list * On St. Louis Cardinals 40-man roster ~ Development list # Rehab assignment ∞ Reserve list ‡ Restricted list § Suspended list † Temporarily inactive list Roster updated March 26, 2025; Transactions → More rosters: MiLB • Florida Complex League → St. Louis Cardinals minor league players

== Florida Complex League Marlins ==
Florida Complex League Marlins roster
Players		Coaches/Other
Pitchers: 21 Josue Arias; 45 Jhon Cabral; 39 Samuel Carpio; 35 Luis Cesar; 41 Rodolfo De La Cruz; 30 Hamlet Garcia; -- Leandro Hernandez; -- Aiden May; 13 Michael Perez; 14 Natanael Polanco; 27 Luis Ramirez; -- Jean Reyes; 44 Darwin Rodriguez; 31 Jhoniel Serrano; -- Jun-Seok Shim; -- Grant Shepardson; -- Dameivi Tineo; 50 Riskiel Tineo; -- Kevin Vaupel	Catchers: 38 Nixon Chirinos; 8 Nestor Rios; 18 Carlos Sanchez; Infielders: 8 Ian Lewis; 17 Fabian Lopez; 6 Cherif Neymour; -- Abrahan Ramirez; 4 Yoffry Solano; Outfielders: 5 Reminton Batista; -- John Cruz; 12 Jose Gerardo; 2 Danny Gonzalez; 20 Julio Henriquez; -- Yeral Martinez; 15 Jose Monserrate; 1 Toby Simmons; 23 Andres Valor	Manager: -- Luis Dorante; Coaches: -- Ivan Arteaga (pitching); -- Wade Elliott (hitting); 7-day injured list * On Miami Marlins 40-man roster ~ Development list # Rehab assignment ∞ Reserve list ‡ Restricted list § Suspended list † Temporarily inactive list Roster updated March 11, 2025; Transactions → More rosters: MiLB • Florida Complex League → Miami Marlins minor league players

== Florida Complex League Mets ==
Florida Complex League Mets roster
Players		Coaches/Other
Pitchers: 29 Luis Alvarez; 55 Jesus Anton; -- Nate Dohm; 75 Andinson Ferrer; -- Jace Hampson; 52 Daviel Hurtado; 78 Miguel Mejias; -- Jonathan Santucci; -- John Valle; 45 Omar Victorino	Catchers: 32 Francisco Toledo; 9 Julio Zayas; Infielders: 15 Branny De Oleo; 4 Jeremy Rodriguez; 10 Dangelo Sarmiento; 20 Jake Zitella; Outfielders: 13 Simon Juan; 28 Jeffry Rosa	Manager: -- Lino Diaz; Coaches: 39 Hector Alvarez (catching); 40 Garrett Baker (pitching); -- Dallas Burke (bench); -- Wander Cabrera (pitching); -- Alejandro Diaz (hitting); -- Ruben Sosa (hitting); 60-day injured list: 79 Cesar Rivera; 7-day injured list * On New York Mets 40-man roster ~ Development list # Rehab assignment ∞ Reserve list ‡ Restricted list § Suspended list † Temporarily inactive list Roster updated March 24, 2025; Transactions → More rosters: MiLB • Florida Complex League → New York Mets minor league players

== Florida Complex League Nationals ==
Florida Complex League Nationals roster
Players		Coaches/Other
Pitchers: 48 Leodarlyn Colon; 53 Kevin Dowdell; 36 Victor Farias; -- Jackson Kent; 73 Andy Luis; -- Henry Moreno; 76 Adrian Ogando; 45 Doimil Perez; 41 Leuris Portorreal; 76 Reilin Ramirez	Catchers: 6 Jeremy Bautista; 25 Agustin Marcano; 14 Jermaine Maricuto; 15 Helder Rosario; Infielders: 10 Luis Arias; -- Luke Dickerson; 8 Misael Mojica; Outfielders: 2 Andy Acevedo; 26 Carlos Batista; 16 Moises Gallardo; 1 Enmanuel Ramirez; 5 Elian Soto; 18 Carlos Tavares	Manager: 3 Luis Ordaz; Coaches: 34 Franklin Bravo (pitching); 57 Ender Chávez (hitting); 52 Joel Hanrahan (rehab pitching); 44 Destin Hood (development); 7-day injured list * On Washington Nationals 40-man roster ~ Development list # Rehab assignment ∞ Reserve list ‡ Restricted list § Suspended list † Temporarily inactive list Roster updated March 24, 2025; Transactions → More rosters: MiLB • Florida Complex League → Washington Nationals minor league players

== Florida Complex League Orioles ==
Florida Complex League Orioles roster
Players		Coaches/Other
Pitchers: 77 Bryan Bautista; -- Deivy Cruz; 48 Kyle Gibson *; 79 Miguel Mesa; 69 Francisco Morao; 72 Jesús Palacios; 63 Andrés Parra; 74 Aneuris Rodriguez; -- Jordany Vasquez ‡	Catchers: 67 Yasmil Bucce; -- Julio Herrera ‡; 65 Andres Nolaya; Infielders: 39 Luis Almeyda; -- DJ Layton; 68 Joshua Liranzo; Outfielders: 80 Mishael Deson; 53 Raylin Ramos	Manager: 12 Christian Frias; Coaches: 92 Adam Bleday (pitching); -- Quentin Holmes (development); -- Cade Johnson (development); 13 Jamie Johnson (fundamentals); 11 Landon Lassiter (fundamentals); 90 Teegan Leader (hitting); -- Jake Ratz (hitting); -- Ramon Sambo (fundamentals); -- Bailey Vuylsteke (pitching); 60-day injured list: 43 Harol Arias (full season); 81 Pedro Figueroa; 58 Yonatan Pineda; 7-day injured list * On Baltimore Orioles 40-man roster ~ Development list # Rehab assignment ∞ Reserve list ‡ Restricted list § Suspended list † Temporarily inactive list Roster updated March 26, 2025 → More rosters: MiLB • Florida Complex League → Baltimore Orioles minor league players

== Florida Complex League Phillies ==
Florida Complex League Phillies roster
Players		Coaches/Other
Pitchers: 45 Wilmer Blanco; 70 Cam Brown; 33 Alexis De La Cruz; 71 Ryan Degges; 89 Ryan Drombowski; 66 Luke Gabrysh; 39 Luis Gonzalez; 80 Tanner Gresham; 57 Maxwell Hernandez; -- Angel Liranzo; 44 Marcus Morgan; 64 Adilson Peralta; 73 Erik Ritchie; 76 Zack Tukis; 72 Kevin Warunek	Catchers: 86 Lou Albrecht; 9 Alirio Ferrebus; 37 Rickardo Perez; Infielders: 3 Nolan Beltran; 13 Aroon Escobar; 94 Nikau Pouaka-Grego; Outfielders: 58 Manolfi Jimenez	Manager: 19 Shawn Williams; Coaches: -- Luis Avilán (pitching); 24 Gary Cathcart (coach); 50 Rafael Delima (hitting); 2 Jake Palomaki (hitting); 11 Jarrod Parker (pitching); 7-day injured list * On Philadelphia Phillies 40-man roster ~ Development list # Rehab assignment ∞ Reserve list ‡ Restricted list § Suspended list † Temporarily inactive list Roster updated March 24, 2025; Transactions → More rosters: MiLB • Florida Complex League → Philadelphia Phillies minor league players

== Florida Complex League Pirates ==
Florida Complex League Pirates roster
Players		Coaches/Other
Pitchers: -- Gavin Adams; -- Matt Ager; 49 Victor Cabreja; -- Ronaldo Gallo; 70 Jose Garces; 45 Brennan Malone; 37 Dioris Martinez; 34 Carlos Mateo; 58 David Matoma; -- Matt McShane; -- Reinold Navarro; 52 Jose Regalado; 36 Pitterson Rosa; -- Jake Shirk; -- Angel Soriano; -- Levi Sterling; 44 Joaquin Tejada; 57 Alexis Torres; 27 Jonawel Valdez	Catchers: -- Camden Janik; 67 John Lopez; 35 Richard Ramirez; 41 Luke Scherrer; -- Miguel Sosa; Infielders: 13 Roinny Aguiar; -- Konnor Griffin; -- Eddie Rynders; -- Wyatt Sanford; 24 Carlos Tirado; 86 Jeral Toledo; 18 John Zorrilla; Outfielders: -- Carl Calixte; -- Ian Farrow; -- Solomon Maguire; 19 Eduardo Oviedo; 12 Jhonson Pena; 6 Estuar Suero	Manager: 32 Kieran Mattison; Coaches: 55 Quentin Brown (hitting); 51 Renny Duarte (pitching); 61 Mick Fieldbinder (pitching); 43 Jose Mendez (bench); 54 Gavi Nivar (coach); 31 Jonathan Roof (hitting); 28 Curt Wilson (hitting); 60-day injured list: 39 Tony Blanco Jr.; -- Jackson Grounds; -- Andres Silvera; 7-day injured list * On Pittsburgh Pirates 40-man roster ~ Development list # Rehab assignment ∞ Reserve list ‡ Restricted list § Suspended list † Temporarily inactive list Roster updated March 24, 2025; Transactions → More rosters: MiLB • Florida Complex League → Pittsburgh Pirates minor league players

== Florida Complex League Rays ==
Florida Complex League Rays roster
Players		Coaches/Other
Pitchers: -- Ryan Andrade; -- Noah Beal; 14 Joel Canizalez; -- Kaleb Corbett; -- Andres Galan; 98 Yonathan Gomez; -- Janzen Keisel; -- Jacob Kmatz; -- Nate Knowles; 90 Roberto Medina; -- Dominic Niman; -- Trey Pooser; 16 Jonathan Russell; -- Ryan Schiefer; -- Bryce Shaffer; -- Jayden Voelker	Catchers: -- Nathan Flewelling; 82 Yirer Garcia; -- Tyler Herron; Infielders: 97 Luis Ariza; 77 Nicandro Aybar; 15 Felix Cotes; 60 Erick Lara; -- Jack Lines; 80 Larry Martinez; 76 Jose Monzon; 64 Juanfel Peguero; -- Tony Santa Maria; Outfielders: 68 Jose Contreras; -- Derek Datil; 74 Brailer Guerrero	Manager: 63 Héctor Giménez; Coaches: 43 Henry Bonilla (pitching); 53 Manny Castillo (coach); 45 Jose Gonzalez (pitching); 48 Esteban Gonzalez (coach); 50 K.C. Judge (hitting); 36 Francisco Leandro (first base); 27 Jim Morrison (coach); 2 Hez Randolph (hitting); 26 Chris Roberson (coach); 6 Alejandro Segovia (hitting); 11 Julio Zorrilla (coach); 7-day injured list * On Tampa Bay Rays 40-man roster ~ Development list # Rehab assignment ∞ Reserve list ‡ Restricted list § Suspended list † Temporarily inactive list Roster updated March 25, 2025; Transactions → More rosters: MiLB • Florida Complex League → Tampa Bay Rays minor league players

== Florida Complex League Red Sox ==
Florida Complex League Red Sox roster
Players		Coaches/Other
Pitchers: 54 Obed Balderas; 51 Adam Bates; -- Brandon Clarke; 38 Nicolas De La Cruz; -- Yhoiker Fajardo; 3 Jesus Garcia; -- Smil Guzman; 17 Chansol Lee; -- Matt McShane; -- Alvaro Mejias; 70 Christian Nunez; 10 Eybersson Polanco; 48 Wuilliams Rodriguez; -- Payton Tolle	Catchers: 15 Frederik Jimenez; -- Gerardo Rodriguez; 2 Kleyver Salazar; Infielders: 50 Yosander Asencio; 30 Yohander Linarez; 81 Franyer Noria; 5 Starlyn Nunez; Outfielders: -- Kolby Johnson	Manager: 31 Jimmy Gonzalez; Coaches: 77 Pablo Cabrera (coach); 87 Chase Illig (coach); -- Michael McCormick (pitching); 71 Jarrett Pico (hitting); 52 Andres Rodriguez (pitching); 36 Junior Zamora (hitting); 7-day injured list * On Boston Red Sox 40-man roster ~ Development list # Rehab assignment ∞ Reserve list ‡ Restricted list § Suspended list † Temporarily inactive list Roster updated March 23, 2025; Transactions → More rosters: MiLB • Florida Complex League → Boston Red Sox minor league players

== Florida Complex League Tigers ==
Florida Complex League Tigers roster
Players		Coaches/Other
Pitchers: -- Bryce Alewine; 56 Ignacio Briceno; 7 Ulices Campos; 87 Jatnk Diaz; 24 Blake Dickerson; -- Lucas Elissalt; -- Owen Hall; -- Michael Massey; 15 Eliseo Mota; -- Dawson Price; -- Andres Ramos; 54 Moises Rodriguez; 93 Johnathan Rogers; -- R. J. Sales; -- Ethan Schiefelbein; -- Shay Timmer; 37 Riley Valentine; 12 Paul Wilson	Catchers: 26 Brady Cerkownyk; -- Hunter Dobbins; 14 Enrique Jimenez; -- Gabriel Rosado; Infielders: -- Abel Bastidas; 78 Yimmy Diaz; 21 Juan Hernandez; 48 Reylin Perez; -- Bryce Rainer; 59 Carson Rucker; 91 Manuel Sequera; -- Jude Warwick; Outfielders: 39 Anibal Salas; -- Samuell Sanchez	Manager: 13 Salvador Paniagua; Coaches: 31 Tyler Anderson (pitching); 60 Rafael Gil (hitting); 17 Chase Glaum (hitting); 36 Willians Moreno (pitching); 60-day injured list: 94 Jack Bushell; 29 Andrew Dunford (full season); 8 Frank Moreno (full season); 40 Albert Oliva; -- Zach Swanson (full season); 7-day injured list * On Detroit Tigers 40-man roster ~ Development list # Rehab assignment ∞ Reserve list ‡ Restricted list § Suspended list † Temporarily inactive list Roster updated March 25, 2025; Transactions → More rosters: MiLB • Florida Complex League → Detroit Tigers minor league players

== Florida Complex League Twins ==
Florida Complex League Twins roster
Players		Coaches/Other
Pitchers: 68 Miguel Cordero; 62 Juan Cota; 25 Joel Garcia; 57 Carlos Gutierrez; -- Dasan Hill; 39 Hunter Hoopes; 56 Andrew Huffman; 37 Eider Machuca; -- Mitch Mueller; 16 Dylan Questad; 33 Liam Rocha; -- Zander Sechrist; 20 Ezequiel Ventura	Catchers: 35 Ricardo Pena; 27 Javier Roman; Infielders: 13 Bryan Acuna; 8 Hendry Chivilli; 19 Gregory Duran; 12 Yilber Herrera; 88 Yohander Martinez; -- Isaac Pena; 50 Dameury Pena; Outfielders: 2 Jayson Bass; 23 Ariel Castro	Manager: 9 Seth Feldman; Coaches: 92 Mike Ahmed (hitting); 97 Anders Dzurak (pitching); 32 Nico Giarratano (development); 93 Emilio Guerrero (hitting); 99 Humberto Miranda (hitting); 96 Chris Powell (pitching); 94 Kevin Rodriguez (pitching); 95 Jesús Sánchez (pitching); 99 Josh Tols (rehab pitching); 86 Tristan Toorie (development); 7-day injured list * On Minnesota Twins 40-man roster ~ Development list # Rehab assignment ∞ Reserve list ‡ Restricted list § Suspended list † Temporarily inactive list Roster updated March 21, 2025; Transactions → More rosters: MiLB • Florida Complex League → Minnesota Twins minor league players

== Florida Complex League Yankees ==
Florida Complex League Yankees roster
Players		Coaches/Other
Pitchers: 50 Chalniel Arias; 35 Angel Benitez; -- Bryce Cunningham; -- J.T. Etherege; 47 Omar Gonzalez; -- Griffin Herring; -- Ben Hess; -- Erick Leal; 22 Sabier Marte; 41 Sunayro Martina; -- Chance Nolan; -- Xavier Rivas; 45 Hansel Rosario; -- Tony Rossi; 66 Yarison Ruiz; -- Jack Sokol; -- Chris Veach; -- Gage Ziehl	Catchers: -- Johan Contreras; -- John Cristino; -- Luis Puello; -- Ediel Rivera; 53 Juan Sanchez; 60 Engelth Urena; Infielders: 17 Santiago Gomez; -- Luis Escudero; 59 Gabriel Terrero; -- Kevin Verde; Outfielders: 12 Brando Mayea; 28 Wilson Rodriguez; 54 Brian Sanchez	Manager: 12 Ryan Chipka; Coaches: 59 Chase Gerbrick (defensive); 69 Ryan Mossman (pitching); 74 Santiago Nessy (defensive); 71 Scott Nestor (hitting); 0 Alexander Rosario (pitching); 60-day injured list: 55 Brian Arias (full season); 56 Orvis Fernandez; -- Thatcher Hurd (full season); 40 Jordarlin Mendoza; 57 Pedro Rodriguez; -- Parker Seay (full season); 7-day injured list * On New York Yankees 40-man roster ~ Development list # Rehab assignment ∞ Reserve list ‡ Restricted list § Suspended list † Temporarily inactive list Roster updated March 26, 2025; Transactions → More rosters: MiLB • Florida Complex League → New York Yankees minor league players

== See also ==
- List of Arizona Complex League team rosters
