= Fred Koenig =

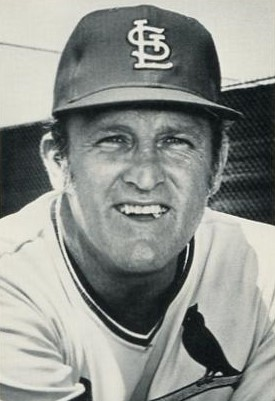
- Coach
- Born: April 27, 1931; St. Louis, Missouri, U.S.
- Died: January 12, 1993 (aged 61); Wagoner, Oklahoma, U.S.
- Batted: Right Threw: Right
- Stats at Baseball Reference

Teams
- California Angels (1970–1971); St. Louis Cardinals (1976); Texas Rangers (1977–1982); Chicago Cubs (1983); Cleveland Indians (1986)

Fred Carl Koenig (April 27, 1931 – January 12, 1993) was an American first baseman and manager in minor league baseball and a coach and farm system director at the Major League level. A native of St. Louis, Missouri, Koenig threw and batted right-handed and stood 6 ft 3 in (191 cm) and weighed 210 pounds (95 kg) in his playing days. He graduated from St. Louis' Central High School and attended the University of Illinois.

Koenig's baseball career began in 1951 with his hometown St. Louis Cardinals as a member of the Hamilton Cardinals of the Class D Pennsylvania–Ontario–New York League (PONY League). His career as a first baseman continued through 1961, but Koenig spent most of his career at the Double-A level, reaching Triple-A in 1959 for only 16 games and 49 at bats with the Omaha Cardinals of the American Association. In his best minor league campaign, with the 1954 Allentown Cardinals of the Class A Eastern League, Koenig batted .287 with 11 home runs and 83 runs batted in in 484 at-bats. He also led the league's first basemen in putouts and double plays and was selected to the Eastern League all-star team.

He became a manager in the Cardinal farm system in 1962, with the Winnipeg Goldeyes of the Class C Northern League. Switching to the California Angels organization in 1965, he managed at the Rookie and Class A levels and won the 1968 Midwest League championship at the helm of the Quad Cities Angels. Koenig then came to the Major Leagues as a coach for Angel skipper Lefty Phillips for 1970–71.

After Phillips' firing in Anaheim at the close of 1971, Koenig returned to the Cardinals for two seasons as a minor league manager, sandwiched around two seasons (1973–74) as the Cardinals' director of player development. He then was a Major League coach for the Cardinals (1976), Texas Rangers (1977–82), Chicago Cubs (1983), and Cleveland Indians (1986). Koenig later worked in the Atlanta Braves' farm system as a roving coach and manager at the Rookie level. He died in Wagoner, Oklahoma, at age 61.

== See also ==
- List of St. Louis Cardinals coaches
