= Ken Deal =

- Pitcher
- Born: Kenneth Eugene Deal; August 30, 1927; Gastonia, North Carolina, U.S.
- Died: August 12, 1993 (aged 65)
- Batted: Right Threw: Right

Kenneth Eugene Deal (August 30, 1927 — August 12, 1993) was an American pitcher and manager in minor league baseball. As a pitcher, he twice won more than 20 games (1947 in the Carolina League and 1949 in the Southeastern League). During a 16-year career he won 121 games, losing 95 (.560) and compiled an earned run average of 3.24. The native of Gastonia, North Carolina, batted and threw right-handed, stood 6 feet 2 inches (1.88 m) tall and weighed 174 pounds (79 kg).

Deal is often remembered as the first manager of Carl Yastrzemski, when the future Hall of Famer made his minor league debut with the Raleigh Capitals of the Class B Carolina League in 1959. Deal managed in the Boston Red Sox farm system from 1957 to 1960, then worked in the New York Mets' minor league organization when Boston's then-farm system director, Johnny Murphy, switched teams after the 1960 season. His managerial record was 430–467 (.479), with one championship (the 1958 Waterloo Hawks of the Midwest League).

Ken Deal died at age 65 in 1993.
