= Dominican Summer League Astros =

- Boca Chica

Team logo	Cap insignia

Minor league affiliations
- Class: Rookie
- League: Dominican Summer League
- Division: Boca Chica North (2010–present)

Major league affiliations
- Team: Houston Astros

Minor league titles
- League titles (0): None

Team data
- Name: Astros
- Ballpark: Houston Astros Complex
- Owner(s)/ Operator(s): Houston Astros
- Manager: Neder Horta

The Dominican Summer League Astros, or DSL Astros, is a minor league baseball team of the Dominican Summer League, and a Rookie-level affiliate of the Houston Astros. They are located in Boca Chica, Santo Domingo, Dominican Republic. From 2014 through 2017, they were divided into two squads: DSL Astros Orange and DSL Astros Blue.

== History ==
The team first came into existence in 1989 when they shared an affiliation with the Chicago White Sox and the Texas Rangers. For 1990, they shared an affiliation with the St. Louis Cardinals. They were independently affiliated for 1991 and 1992, then gained an affiliation with the San Francisco Giants and Philadelphia Phillies for 1993. From 1994 to 1995, they shared an affiliation with the Milwaukee Brewers. For 1996, they shared an affiliation with the Boston Red Sox. Since 1997, they have been an independent affiliate of the Astros. Beginning in 2014, the team split into two squads, DSL Astros Orange and DSL Astros Blue.

== Roster ==
Dominican Summer League Astros Blue roster
Players		Coaches/Other
Pitchers: 44 Luis Aguilar; -- Luis Amador; 39 Angel Aybar; 43 Miguel Balza; 47 Nick Borquez; 9 Anthony Gantes; -- Allan Garcia; -- Alex Gonzalez; -- Robier Hernandez; -- Juan Martinez; -- Frankelys Mendoza; 58 Manuel Mendoza; 41 Juan Mieses; -- Carlos Montes ‡; 46 Miguel Nunez; -- Isaac Palacio; -- Emilio Payro; 59 Javier Perez; 31 Porfirio Ramos; -- Luis Reyes; -- Darwin Rosario ‡; -- Adrian Ruiz; 6 Kevin Santana	Catchers: 27 Alejandro Castellano; 55 Miguel Flores; -- Ire Garcia; Infielders: 4 Samuel Brito; -- Christian Colon; 11 Wilton Lara; -- Pablo Martinez; 37 Hector Salas; 3 Franchely Silverio; Outfielders: -- Kevin Alvarez; -- Yensi De La Cruz; 21 Amauri Ramirez; -- Rainier Rivas; 18 Esteban Romero; 8 Juan Sierra	Manager: Johe Acosta; Coaches: Luis Reynoso (hitting); Starlyng Sanchez (pitching); 7-day injured list * On Houston Astros 40-man roster ~ Development list # Rehab assignment ∞ Reserve list ‡ Restricted list § Suspended list † Temporarily inactive list Roster updated March 14, 2025; Transactions → More rosters: MiLB • Dominican Summer League → Houston Astros minor league players

Dominican Summer League Astros Orange roster
Players		Coaches/Other
Pitchers: 28 Adrian Ardines; 41 Jhoster Baez; -- Antonio Delgado; 21 Norbis Diaz; 30 Eddy Mota; 35 Cristian Navarro; 27 Jesus Nunez; 15 Angel Peralta; 16 Jank Pichardo; 37 Gabriel Rivero; 20 Mauricio Rodriguez; 43 Mario Salazar; -- Jorman Santana ‡; 8 Jose Serrano; 22 Dionel Villalobos	Catchers: 11 Francisco Caldera; 29 Diego Campos; 12 Alexi Quiroz; 13 Yosweld Vasquez; Infielders: 6 Sandro Pereira; Outfielders: 2 Ariel Lebron; 31 Leandro Morgado; 44 Eduardo Perez; 9 Luis Quesada; 1 Roiner Quintana	Manager: -- Manny Martínez; Coaches: -- Rick Aponte (pitching); -- Carlos Canelon (coach); -- Brauly Mejia (hitting); -- Luis Alfredo Ramirez (pitching); 7-day injured list * On Houston Astros 40-man roster ~ Development list # Rehab assignment ∞ Reserve list ‡ Restricted list § Suspended list † Temporarily inactive list Roster updated February 14, 2025; Transactions → More rosters: MiLB • Dominican Summer League → Houston Astros minor league players
