= Al Yates =

American baseball player (1945-2007)

- Outfielder
- Born: May 26, 1945; Jersey City, New Jersey, U.S.
- Died: November 23, 2007 (aged 62); Miami, Florida, U.S.
- Batted: Right Threw: Right

MLB debut
- May 13, 1971, for the Milwaukee Brewers

Last MLB appearance
- July 27, 1971, for the Milwaukee Brewers

MLB statistics
- Batting average: .277
- Home runs: 1
- Runs batted in: 4
- Stats at Baseball Reference

Teams
- Milwaukee Brewers (1971)

Albert Arthur Yates (May 26, 1945 – November 23, 2007) was an American professional baseball player who appeared in 24 games in Major League Baseball for the Milwaukee Brewers in the 1971 season, primarily as an outfielder. Born in Jersey City, New Jersey, Yates threw and batted right-handed and was listed as 6 feet 2 inches (1.88 m) tall and 210 pounds (95 kg).

== Early years ==
Raised in Bogota, New Jersey, Yates attended Bogota High School. He was signed by the New York Mets in 1964 as an amateur free agent out of Bloomsburg University of Pennsylvania. He played in the New York–Penn League for the Auburn Mets during two seasons (1964–1965). As a big leaguer with the 1971 Brewers, he collected 24 hits, including two doubles and one home run, a solo shot on June 6 at Milwaukee County Stadium off Dave McNally of the defending world champion Baltimore Orioles.

Yates retired from baseball after the 1971 campaign.
