= Doc Daugherty =

American baseball player (1927–2015)

- Pinch hitter
- Born: October 12, 1927; Paris, Pennsylvania, U.S.
- Died: August 15, 2015 (aged 87); Downingtown, Pennsylvania, U.S.
- Batted: Right Threw: Right

MLB debut
- April 22, 1951, for the Detroit Tigers

Last MLB appearance
- April 22, 1951, for the Detroit Tigers

MLB statistics
- Games played: 1
- At bats: 1
- Hits: 0
- Stats at Baseball Reference

Teams
- Detroit Tigers (1951)

Harold Ray "Doc" Daugherty (October 12, 1927 – August 15, 2015) was an American professional baseball player and manager, and high school football head coach. A shortstop in minor league baseball, he made one appearance as a pinch hitter in the Major Leagues for the Detroit Tigers in 1951.

A native of Weirton, West Virginia, Daugherty attended Ohio State University, where he played football. After his baseball playing career ended, he became a teacher and coach in West Virginia and Ohio, and also managed the Short Season-Class A Duluth–Superior Dukes for the 1965 season.
