= Cocoa Astros =

- 1965–1977; (1965–1972, 1977); Cocoa, Florida

Minor league affiliations
- Previous classes: Class A (1965–1977)
- League: Florida State League

Major league affiliations
- Previous teams: Houston Astros (1965–1972, 1977)

Team data
- Previous names: Cocoa Astros (1965–1972, 1977)
- Previous parks: Cocoa Expo Sports Center (1965–1972, 1977)

The Cocoa Astros were a professional minor league baseball team in the Florida State League (FSL), as a Class A level affiliate with the Houston Astros from 1965–72 and 1977. The team played at the Astros' spring training facility. The first Cocoa FSL team was known as the Cocoa Indians who played from 1951 to 1958. The Indians won the Florida State League title in 1956 with a 90-50 record.

== The ballparks ==
The Cocoa Astros hosted minor league home games at the Cocoa Expo Sports Center, The ballpark facility is still in use and is located at 500 Friday Road in Cocoa. The baseball facility was originally built in 1964 for the Houston Colt .45's use as a Spring training site and remained in use by Houston for 21 seasons. The Indians played at the Ball Fields at 1450 Minuteman Causeway.

== Notable alumni ==
- Bruce Bochy (1977) MGR: 4× World Series Champion (2010, 2012, 2014) – S.F. Giants (2023) - Texas Rangers
- Jim Pankovits (1977)
- Joe Pittman (1977)
- Gary Rajsich (1977)
- Bert Roberge (1977)
- Dave Smith (1977) 2x MLB All-Star
- Paul Siebert (1972)
- John McLaren (1972)
- Jimy Williams (1972, MGR) 1999 AL Manager of the Year
- Jackie Brandt (1970)
- Mike Cosgrove (1970–1971)
- Mike Easler (1970–71) MLB All-Star
- Stan Papi (1970–1971)
- J. R. Richard (1970) MLB All-Star; 1979 NL ERA Leader; 2× NL Strikeout Leader (1978, 1979)
- Derrel Thomas (1969)
- Oscar Zamora (1969)
- Cesar Cedeno (1968) 4x MLB All-Star
- John Mayberry (1968) 2x MLB All-Star
- Leo Posada (1968–1969, Player/MGR)
- Ed Acosta (1967–1968)
- Ed Armbrister (1967–1968)
- Enzo Hernández (1967)
- Cliff Johnson (1967–1968)
- Scipio Spinks (1967)
- Roric Harrison (1966)
- Bob Watson (1966) 2x MLB All-Star
- Danny Walton (1965)
- Don Wilson (1965) MLB All-Star; 2x No-Hitters; Died age 29
