= Coastal Florida Sports Park =

Sport complex in Cocoa, Florida, US

- Interactive map of Coastal Florida Sports Park
- Former names: Cocoa Expo Sports Center
- Location: 500 Friday Road; Cocoa, FL 32926
- Coordinates: 28.363004°N 80.802861°W
- Capacity: 3,900

Construction
- Renovated: 2012

Tenants
- Houston Astros (MLB) (spring training) (1964–1984); Cocoa Rookie League (1964); Cocoa Astros, FSL (1965–1972, 1977); Cocoa Astros, Florida East Coast League (1972); Cocoa Expos, Florida East Coast League (1972); Florida Marlins (MLB) (spring training) (1993)

Coastal Florida Sports Park (formerly known as Cocoa Expo Sports Center) is a multi-sport complex located in Cocoa, Florida. Coastal Florida facilities include outdoor baseball, football, soccer and lacrosse fields, an indoor multipurpose field, batting cages and a weight room. The complex was the spring training home for Major League Baseball's Houston Astros for 21 seasons.

== Facilities ==
- Eleven (11) lighted NCAA baseball fields
  - Including a newly renovated 5,000-seat MLB stadium with 50 ft Jumbotron scoreboard
  - Eight (8) football / soccer / lacrosse fields
- A 35,000 square foot, $5 million training facility which includes:
  - A 17,000 square foot indoor, multipurpose field for football, soccer, or a baseball infield
  - 14 indoor batting cages
    - Including seven (7) ProBatter Video Pitching Simulators
  - A 15,000 square foot weight room with free weights and training machines
- Onsite player suites in the Player Hotel
- A recreations hall with two 32-foot HDTVs and six 70-inch HDTVs

Coastal Florida Sports Park will soon begin construction on a 100,000 square foot gymnasium that will have eleven (11) NBA / NCAA / FIBA-regulation hardwood basketball courts, which can be converted into fourteen (14) volleyball courts.

== CES Academy ==
Coastal Florida Sports Park has also created a college sports preparatory academy, CES Academy. CES Academy is a sports academy and boarding school that will prepare its student-athletes to become successful, confident, and responsible individuals through athletics, academics, and character development.

== History ==
Cocoa Expo Sports Center was built and opened in 1964 by the city of Cocoa as the spring training home for Major League Baseball's Houston Colt .45s. The ballpark was dedicated on March 15, 1964 prior to its first spring training game which the Colt .45s lost 6-2 to the Philadelphia Phillies before 3,245 fans.

Cocoa Expo was the spring training home of the Colt .45s/Astros through 1984.

The ballpark was purchased by private ownership in 1984 and turned into a center for amateur sports. The complex, consisting of 70 acres (28 ha), has the original 5,000 seat Cocoa Stadium and 6 additional baseball fields, four multi-purpose athletic fields, a 20,000-square-foot (1,900 m^{2}) arena that can accommodate three basketball courts and four volleyball courts, a 100-room air-conditioned athletes dormitory, cafeteria and meeting space. The 40 acres (16 ha) main section of the property was valued at $3.5 million in 1984 according to the county appraiser's records.

The center again hosted Major League Baseball in the spring of 1993 when the Florida Marlins played their inaugural spring training season games in Cocoa Stadium. In addition to Major League Baseball, the complex has been home to the Joe Brinkman Umpire School, Clint Hurdle's Big League Experience Camp, youth baseball, soccer, basketball and volleyball tournaments and is the home field for the Cocoa Expos professional women's soccer team.

By the end of 2016, with a great deal of support from private financial investors, the Coastal Florida Sports Park (FKA Cocoa Expo Sports Center) was renovated. The renovation cost $40 million and included the Major League spring training ballpark as well as eleven baseball and multi purpose fields, a hotel and indoor training center.
