= Rome Romans (Georgia baseball) =

- 1910–1916; (1910–1917, 1920–1921); Rome, Georgia

Minor league affiliations
- Class: Class D (1910–1917, 1920–1921)
- League: Southeastern League (1910–1912); Appalachian League (1913); Georgia–Alabama League (1914–1917); Georgia State League (1920–1921)

Major league affiliations
- Team: None

Minor league titles
- League titles (1): 1916

Team data
- Name: Rome Romans (1903, 1910–1916); Rome-Lindale Romans (1917); Rome (1920–1921)
- Ballpark: Hamilton Park (1910–1917, 1920–1921)

The Rome Romans were a minor league baseball team based in Rome, Georgia. Between 1910 and 1916, the "Romans" played as members of the Class D level Georgia–Alabama League, winning the 1916 league championship. The team continued Georgia–Alabama League play in 1917 known as the "Rome-Lindale Romans" followed by Rome teams of the 1920 and 1921 Class D level Georgia State League.

The Rome Romans hosted home minor league games at the Rome ballpark, then called "Hamilton Park," which was located on the parcel of today's Barron Stadium.

The Rome Red Sox of 1950 and 1951 seasons followed and preceded today's Rome Emperors team of the South Atlantic League, who began play in 2003 as the Rome Braves.

== History ==
=== 1910 to 1917 - Three leagues, one championship ===
The 1903 "Rome Romans" first appeared in references as members of the four-team Alabama–Georgia League. No information about the Rome team or league rosters and records are known. League teams had collegiate players on their rosters. Players were housed with host families, as the Anniston Invincibles team dominated the league compiling a 42–11 record before disbanding due to the lack of competition among the rest of the teams.

The Rome Romans began minor league play in 1910 and were followed by the Rome-Lindale Romans who played in 1917 as members of the Class D level Georgia–Alabama League. The Rome team proceeded to play the 1920 and 1921 seasons as members of the Class D level Georgia State League.

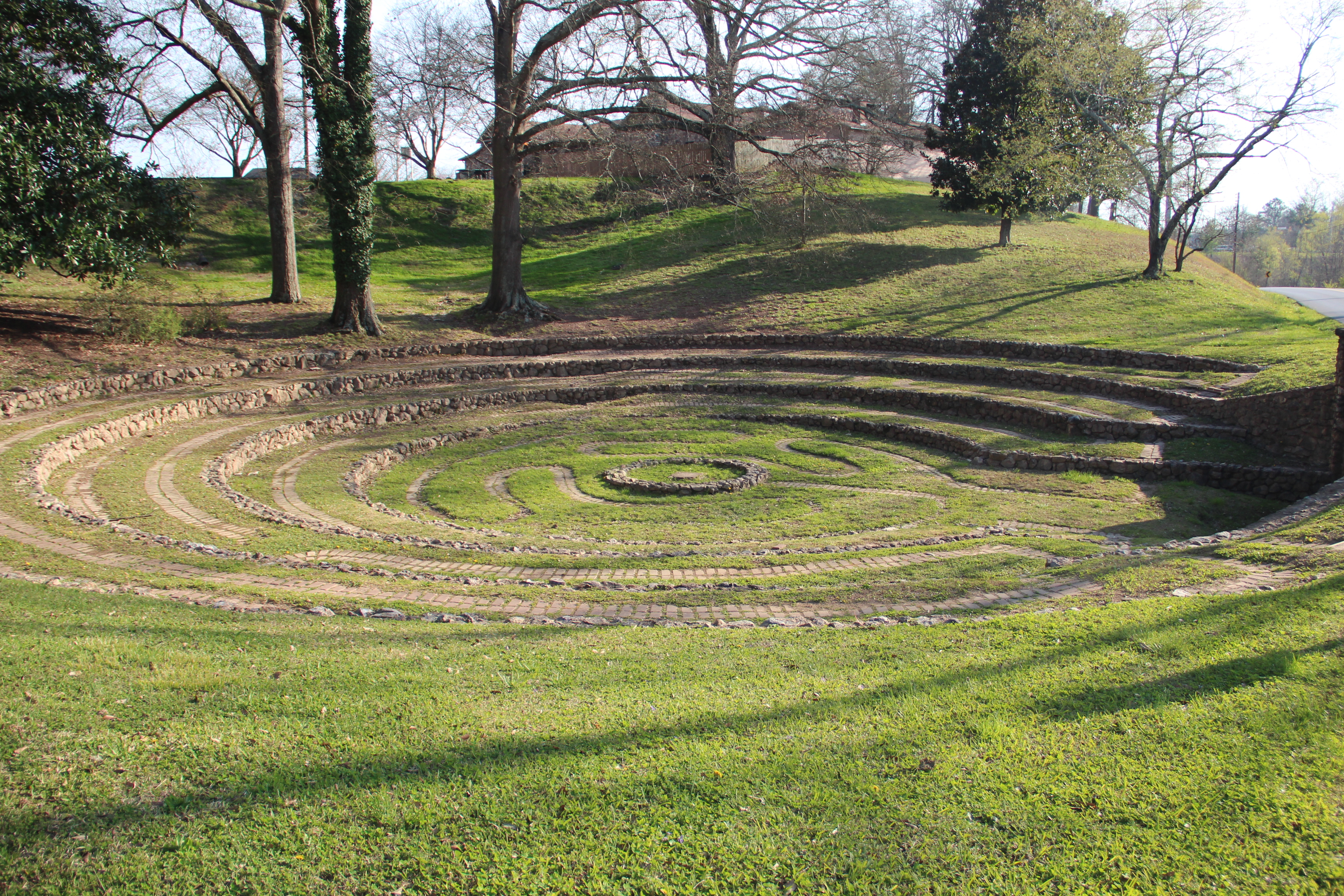
(2018) The Labyrinth of Rome, Georgia.

The "Romans" nickname for the baseball team correlates to local history, as the city is named for Rome, Italy. A Roman labyrinth was constructed in Rome, Georgia in honor of their Roman lineage.

In 1910, the Rome Romans began minor league play when the Romans team was formed and became charter members of the six-team Class D level Southeastern League. The Asheville Moonshiners, Gadsden Steel Makers, Johnson City Soldiers, Knoxville Appalachians and Morristown Jobbers teams joined with Rome in beginning league play on June 8, 1910.

Ending the 1910 season with a record of 44–41, Rome finished in a fourth-place tie with Anniston, who had the identical record. Playing the Southeastern League season under managers Joe Patton, C.G. Milford and Walter Justus, Rome ended the season 8.5 games behind the first place Knoxville Appalachians in the final standings. Roy Thrasher, who split the season between Ashville and Rome, won the league batting title, hitting .324 and also led the league in stolen bases.

The 1911 Rome Romans continued Southeastern League play, with only the Gadson team joining Rome in returning to the league, as four new franchises were added. Gadson and Rome were joined by the Anniston Models, Decatur Twins, Huntsville Westerns and Selma Centralites teams in the six-team league, which began play on May 8, 1911. The 1911 Rome team was also called the "Hillies" and Rome was the only league team not located in Alabama for the 1911 season. With a record of 47–54, Rome placed fourth out of the six teams, playing under managers Carlton Beusse and Danny Burt. First place Anniston finished 18.0 games ahead of Rome in the final standings of the Southeastern League, which held no playoffs

On August 3, 1912, Georgia native Carl East made his professional debut with the Rome Romans as a pitcher. East advanced and made the major leagues as a pitcher with the St. Louis Browns in 1915. Then, after being sent back to the minor leagues, East left pitching and became an outfielder and again advanced to play for the 1924 Washington Senators. In 1924, East left the Senators to take a more lucrative contract with a team in Beloit, Wisconsin. East once had an outfield collision with future Baseball Hall of Fame member Jocko Conlan while playing in the minors in 1920. East was knocked unconscious in the collision, but remained in the game and hit a single, double, and home run.

The 1912 Rome Romans continued play as members of the Southeastern League, but the league folded before the end of the regular season. The league began play on April 5, 1912. After beginning the second half of the split-season schedule on July 22, the league disbanded August 2, 1912. The league folded with the following official second half standings: Gadsden (7–4), Talladega Highlanders (5-5), Selma (5–6), and Rome (5–7). Rome ended the 1912 season with an overall record of 40–43, finishing in fourth place, as Matty Matthews served as manager. The Romans ended the season 9.0 games behind first place Gadsen.

Following the folding of the Southeastern League, 1913 Rome Romans played one season as members of the six–team, Class D level Appalachian League. After the conclusion of the 1912 season, the Morristown Jobbers team of the Appalachian League relocated their franchise to Rome for the 1913 league season and Rome joined the new league. It would ultimately be the only season for Rome as members of the league. The Bristol Boosters, Cleveland Counts, Johnson City Soldiers, Knoxville Reds and Middlesboro Colonels teams joined the Rome Romans in beginning league play on May 8, 1913.

The Rome Romans placed fifth in the 1913 Appalachian League final standings. Rome ended the 1913 season with a record of 45–56 as Jack Reidy served as manager. The Romans finished 19½ games behind the first place Johnson City in the final standings, as the league held no playoffs. John Cochran led the Appalachian League with 20 home runs. His 87 runs and 151 total hits also led the league. After the season, the Appalachian League reduced to four teams for the 1914 season and Rome did not return to the league, which played with the Harriman Boosters, Knoxville, Middlesboro Colonels and Morristown Jobbers teams in 1914 before disbanding during the season.

With the Appalachian League reducing to four teams, the Rome Romans continued play in 1914, as the ream became members the eight-team Class D level Georgia–Alabama League. The league expanded from six teams to eight teams. The returning Anniston Moulders, Gadsden Steel Makers, LaGrange Terrapins, Newnan Cowetas, Opelika Opelicans and Talladega Indians were the returning member teams and joined with the expansion Rome Romans and Selma River Rats in beginning league play on May 5, 1913.

The Romans placed fifth in the final standings as the league expanded from six teams to eight teams for the 1914 season. The Romans ended the 1914 season with a record of 45–56, to finish in fifth place out of the eight teams. Playing the season under returning Manager Jack Reidy, Rome finished 3.0 games behind the first place Selma River Rats in the final standings. Player manager Jack Reidy led the league with 76 runs scored and 117 hits.

The 1915 Alabama–Georgia League played a shortened season, ending play on July 14, 1915. The Newnan Cowetas were in first place when the season ended and Rome placed fourth. The Romans ended their shortened 1915 season with a record of 27–31, placing fourth out of the six league teams. Manager Art Burleson managed the team. Rome ended the season 11.0 games behind first place Newnan in the final standings. Rome's George Cochran scored 47 runs to lead the Alabama–Georgia League.

Despite folding during the season before, the Georgia–Alabama League reformed in 1916, playing a planned shortened season and the Rome Romans captured the league championship. The league folded on July 22, 1916, with Rome in first place in the league standings. Playing the season under manager Frank Manush, the Rome Romans ended the season with a record of 41–26, finishing 3.0 games ahead of the second place Newnan Cowetas in the final standings, as the league ended play early as scheduled on July 22. Ben Shaw of Rome lead the league with 89 total hits and Rome pitcher Joseph Wiley tied for the Georgia–Alabama League lead with 15 wins.

The Georgia–Alabama League continued play in 1917, and the renamed "Rome-Lindale Romans" were the defending champions in the six-team league. Remaining based in Rome, the team was named in partnership with nearby Lindale, Georgia and continued play at the Rome Ball Park. On May 23, 1917, the Georgia-Alabama League folded. In the brief season, the Rome-Lindale team finished with a record of 9–9 to place fourth in the final standings when the league stopped play. Playing the brief season under manager Daniel Overton, the Romans finished 4.0 games behind the first place Anniston Moulders in the final standings. The Georgia-Alabama League did not return to play in the 1918 season. The Georgia–Alabama League did not return to play in 1918 and there were only ten total minor leagues that played the season in 1918 due to World War I.

=== 1920 to 1921 - Georgia State League ===
The 1920 Rome Romans resumed minor league play, as the team became members of the reformed six–team Class D level Georgia State League. The Carrollton, Cedartown Cedars, Griffin, LaGrange and Lindale Pepperells teams joined Rome in beginning league play on May 20, 1920.

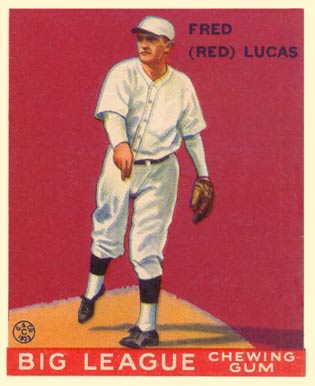
(1933) Red Lucas, Goudey baseball card. Lucas pitched for Rome in 1920. Lucas is a member of the Cincinnati Reds Hall of Fame.

Pitcher Red Lucas played for Rome in 1920. Living in Nashville, Tennessee in 1920, where his father worked in a factory, Lucas was 20-years old and pitching in an amateur Nashville City league. Major league pitcher Tom "Shotgun" Rogers saw him pitch and subsequently took Lucas to a try-out in 1920. He was signed to a contract with Bartow Polkers in the Florida State League but was quickly released. Back in Nashville and in attendance at a local ballgame, Lucas received a telegram telling him to report to Rome in the Georgia State League immediately. Rome signed him and he finished the 1920 season with the team. Lucas played for the Cincinnati Reds and Pittsburgh Pirates in a seventeen-year major league career. Lucas gave up home run number 712 to Babe Ruth on May 25, 1935, the day Ruth hit his last three career home runs. Lucas is in the Cincinnati Reds Hall of Fame.

Rome finished the 1920 season with a record of 50–40. The Romans placed second in the Georgia State League standings, playing the season under manager Tim Bowden, Rome finished 5.0 games behind the first place Carrollton team in the final standings of the six-team league.

On August 13, 1921, pitcher C. Hanson of Rome threw a no-hitter in a Georgia State league game against the LaGrange team. Hanson and Rome won the by the score of game 1–0. The game was the second game of a double header played in Rome.

The Rome Romans continued play in the 1921 six–team Georgia State League and ended the season in fourth place. Rome finished with a record of 50–48, placing fourth in the 1921 standings of the eight-team league. Playing under manager James C. Fox, Rome finished 17½ games behind the first place Lindale team in the regular season standings. In the league playoff, the LaGrange team defeated the Lindell 4 games to 1 to win the championship. The Georgia State League permanently folded after the 1921 season, leaving the Rome team without a league membership for nearly 30 years.

Rome next hosted minor league play in 1950, when the Rome Red Sox rejoined the eight-team Class D level Georgia–Alabama League after a 33-season absence from the league. Despite being called the "Red Sox," the 1950 team was a minor league affiliate of the Washington Senators. The Alexander City Millers, Carrollton Hornets, Griffin Tigers, LaGrange Troupers, Newnan Brownies, Opelika Owls and Valley Rebels joined the Red Sox in 1950 league play.

The Georgia–Alabama League permanently folded following the 1951 season. Rome was without minor league baseball until 2003, when the Rome Braves began play as members of the Class A level South Atlantic League.

== The ballpark ==
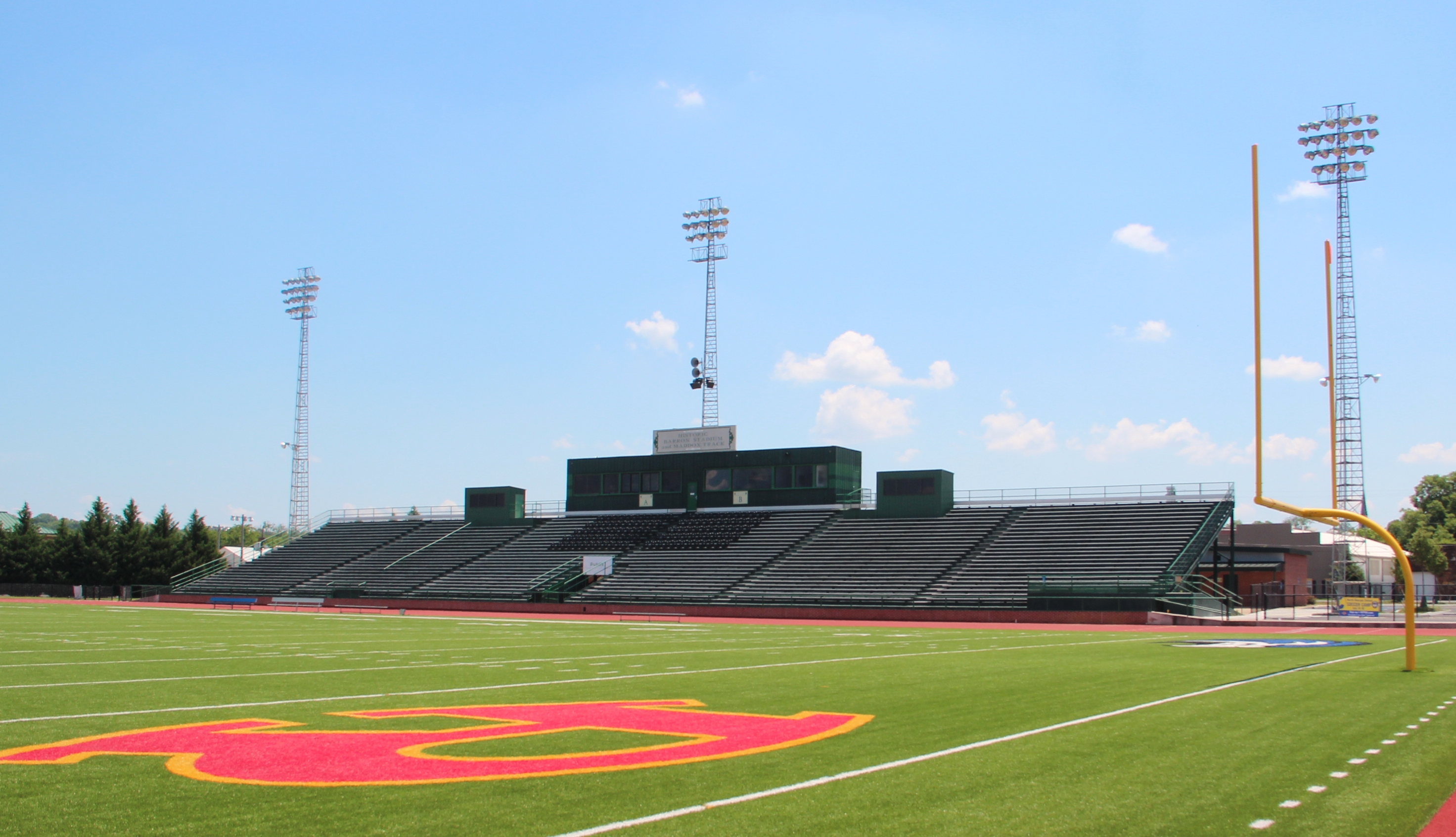
(2015) Barron Stadium. Rome, Georgia.

In the seasons between 1910 and 1921, the Rome minor league teams hosted minor league home games exclusively at the Rome Ball Park. The site of the ballpark and athletic field was originally known as "Hamilton Field". The newly built stadium portion of the parcel was renamed "Barron Stadium" in 1925 after local businessman William F. Barron, who helped acquire the property, which had been private. Barron's father was also a local business man and founded the a Coca-Cola bottling plant in Rome in 1901. Today, the site remains an athletic facility for Rome high school and youth teams and is home to Barron Stadium, named for the Barrons. The facility is located at 300 West 3rd Street in Rome, Georgia.

Today, the Rome Emperors host South Atlantic League minor league home games at AdventHealth Stadium. The ballpark is located at 755 Braves Boulevard in Rome, Georgia.

== Timeline ==
Year(s)	# Yrs.	Team	Level	League	Ballpark
1910-1912	3	Rome Romans	Class D	Southeastern League	Hamilton Park
1913	1	Rome Romans	Class D	Appalachian League	Hamilton Park
1914-1916	3	Rome Romans	Class D	Georgia–Alabama League	Hamilton Park
1917	1	Rome-Lindale Romans	Class D	Georgia–Alabama League	Hamilton Park
1920-1921	2	Rome	Class D	Georgia State League	Hamilton Park

== Year–by–year records ==
Year	Record	Finish	Manager	Playoffs/Notes
1910	44–41	4th (t)	Joe Patton / C.G. Milford / Walter Justus	No playoffs held
1911	47–57	4th	Carlton Beusse / Don Burt	League folded August 2
1912	37–36	4th	Matty Matthews	No playoffs held
1913	45–56	5th	Jack Reidy	No playoffs held
1914	46–50	5th	Jack Reidy	No playoffs held
1915	27–31	4th	Art Burleson	League folded July 14
1916	43–22	1st	Frank Manush	League champions League folded July 22
1917	9–9	4th	Daniel Overton	League folded May 23
1920	50–40	2nd	Tim Bowden	No playoffs held
1921	50–48	4th	James C. Fox	No playoffs held

== Notable alumni ==
- Tim Bowden (1920, MGR)
- Carl East (1912)
- Bill Grahame (1913)
- Sam Lanford (1911)
- Red Lucas (1920) Cincinnati Reds Hall of Fame
- Jeff McCleskey (1911)
- Frank Manush (1916, MGR)
- William Pierson (1921)
- Milt Reed (1911)
- Jack Reis (1911)
- Joseph Wiley (1915)

== See also ==
- Rome Romans players
- Rome (minor league baseball) players
