= Georgia–Alabama League =

- Classification: Class D (1913–1917, 1928–1930, 1946–1951)
- Sport: Minor League Baseball
- First season: 1913; 113 years ago
- Folded: 1951; 75 years ago
- President: W. J. Boykin (1913–1914); C. L. Bruner (1915); Dick Jemison (1916–1917); Dred Johnson (1917); C. I. Scarborough (1928-1929); L. H. Carre (1930); Carl East (1946); Arthur R. Decatur (1947–1951)
- No. of teams: 18
- Country: United States of America
- Most titles: 2 Newnan (1915, 1949); Lindale (1929–1930); Carrollton (1946 –1947); LaGrange (1950–1951)
- Related competitions: Georgia–Florida League; Georgia State League; Florida–Alabama–Georgia League

The Georgia–Alabama League was a minor league baseball league that operated in its two namesake states. The circuit first operated from 1913 to 1917, was revived from 1928 to 1930, then returned to operation for a final time from 1946 through 1951. The league's existence thus spanned some 39 years, but it only fielded teams in 14 seasons. All versions of the Georgia–Alabama League were Class D leagues, the lowest classification in Organized Ball during their years of operation.

Sixteen cities fielded teams in the league at one time or another—nine from Alabama and seven from Georgia. No city was represented in all three of the league's runs. Out of the 14 seasons that the league played, the Georgia teams won eleven titles while the Alabama cities captured only three. Four Georgia teams won two titles each over the league's three eras: Newnan, Georgia, won the first of their two crowns in 1915, then waited some 34 years to collect the second in 1949; Lindale, Georgia, won in 1929 and 1930; Carrollton, Georgia, picked up two back-to-back titles in 1946 and 1947; and LaGrange, Georgia, took the league's last two championships in 1950 and 1951.

Attendance figures were available for the last run of six years, during which the league drew just shy of 2,000,000 fans to the parks. The turnstile count peaked at about 480,000 in 1947 but by 1951 it had dropped to a little over 175,000, which was insufficient to keep the circuit in operation.

== Cities represented ==
- Alexander City, Alabama: Alexander City Millers (1947–1951)
- Anniston, Alabama: Anniston Moulders (1913–1917); Anniston Nobles (1928–1930)
- Carrollton, Georgia: Carrollton Frogs (1928); Carrollton Champs (1929–1930); Carrollton Hornets (1946–1950)
- Cedartown, Georgia: Cedartown Sea Cows (1928–1929); Cedartown Braves (1930)
- Gadsden, Alabama: Gadsden Steel Makers (1913–1914); Gadsden Eagles (1928–1929)
- Gadsden, Alabama: Alabama City, Alabama & Attalla, Alabama: Tri-Cities Triplets (1917)
- Griffin, Georgia: Griffin Lightfoots (1915–1916); Griffin Griffs (1917); Griffin Pimientos (1947–1949); Griffin Tigers (1950); Griffin Pimientos (1951)
- Huntsville, Alabama: Huntsville Springers (1930)
- LaGrange, Georgia: LaGrange Terrapins (1913–1915); LaGrange Grangers (1916–1917); LaGrange Troupers (1946–1951)
- Lindale, Georgia: Rome-Lindale Romans (1917); Lindale Dragons (1928); Lindale Collegians (1929); Lindale Pepperells (1930)
- Newnan, Georgia: Newnan Cowetas (1913–1916); Newnan Brownies (1946–1950)
- Opelika, Alabama: Opelika Opelicans (1913); Opelika Pelicans (1914); Opelika Owls (1946–1951)
- Rome, Georgia: Rome Romans (1914–1916); Rome-Lindale Romans (1917); Rome Red Sox (1950–1951)
- Selma, Alabama: Selma River Rats (1914)
- Talladega, Alabama: Talladega Indians (1913–1914); Talladega Tigers (1915–1917); Talladega Indians (1928–1930)
- Tallassee, Alabama: Tallassee Indians (1946–1948); Tallassee Cardinals (1949)
- Valley, Alabama: Lanett, Alabama & West Point, Georgia: Valley Rebels (1946–1951)

== Standings & statistics ==
=== 1913 to 1917 ===
1913 Georgia–Alabama League

Team standings	W	L	PCT	GB	Managers
Gadsden Steel Makers	51	38	.573	-	Elmer Randall
Newnan Cowetas	46	44	.511	5½	E.S. Bagwell / Ed Shulze
Opelika Opelicans	46	45	.505	6	Ed Ery
Anniston Moulders	45	45	.500	6½	Chick Hannon
LaGrange Terrapins	42	48	.467	9½	William "Ducky" Holmes
Talladega Indians	40	50	.444	11½	Charles Reece

No Playoffs Scheduled

Player statistics
Player	Team	Stat	Tot	Player	Team	Stat	Tot
George Randall	Gadsden	BA	.410	Ed Ery	Opelika	W	19
Larry Pezold	Gadsden	Runs	76	Ed Ery	Opelika	Pct	.792; 19-5
Midge Craven	Newnan	Hits	121				

1914 Georgia–Alabama League

Team standings	W	L	PCT	GB	Managers
Selma River Rats	60	35	.632	-	W. Guiterrez / Arthur Riggs
Newnan Cowetas	56	37	.602	3	Warren Sanders
LaGrange Terrapins	55	43	.561	6½	Ed Lafitte
Opelika Pelicans	52	45	.536	9	Kirk Newell / Elmer Steele
Rome Romans	46	50	.479	14½	Jack Reidy
Anniston Moulders	41	54	.432	19	Bob Ragsdale / Louis Procter
Talladega Indians	37	55	.402	21	Carl Pace / Lovell Draper; Howard Baker / Clarence Garrett
Gadsden Steel Makers	32	60	.348	26½	Bruce Hayes / Lou Jorda / L. Mills

Gadsden became a road club August 3.

Player statistics
Player	Team	Stat	Tot	Player	Team	Stat	Tot
Lloyd Howell	Newnan	BA	.332	Jack Reidy	Rome	Hits	117
Jack Reidy	Rome	Runs	76				

1915 Georgia–Alabama League

Team standings	W	L	PCT	GB	Managers
Newnan Cowetas	39	20	.661	-	Henry Mathewson
Talladega Tigers	39	22	.639	1	Clarence Garrett
Griffin Lightfoots	32	28	.533	7½	Doc Martin / Ed Reagan
Rome Romans	27	31	.466	11½	Art Burleson
Anniston Moulders	22	38	.367	17½	Elmer Steele
LaGrange Terrapins	18	38	.327	19½	Ed Lafitte

The league disbanded July 14.

Player statistics
Player	Team	Stat	Tot	Player	Team	Stat	Tot
Don Flynn	Newnan	BA	.358	Jack Nabors	Talladega/Newnan	W	12
George Cochran	Rome	Runs	47	Whitey Glazner	Anniston	SO	101
Don Flynn	Newnan	Hits	76	Milt Watson	Griffin	Pct	1.000; 7-0
Don Flynn	Newnan	HR	15				

1916 Georgia–Alabama League

Team standings	W	L	PCT	GB	Managers
Rome Romans	43	22	.662	-	Frank Manush
Newnan Cowetas	41	26	.612	3	Henry Mathewson
LaGrange Grangers	39	29	.574	5½	Grady Bowen / Ed Lafitte
Talladega Tigers	26	38	.406	16½	Clarence Garrett
Anniston Moulders	23	39	.371	18½	Bill Reynolds
Griffin Lightfoots	23	41	.359	19½	Kid Reagan / Phil Wells

Player statistics
Player	Team	Stat	Tot	Player	Team	Stat	Tot
Don Flynn	Newnan	BA	.365	Joseph Wiley	Rome	W	15
Don Flynn	Newnan	Runs	52	Robert Watkins	Newnan	W	15
Ben Shaw	Rome	Hits	89	Rufus Nolly	LaGrange	Pct	.857; 12-2

1917 Georgia–Alabama League

Team standings	W	L	PCT	GB	Managers
Anniston Moulders	13	5	.722	-	Bill Pierre
Griffin Griffs	10	7	.588	2½	Matty Matthews
Tri-Cities Triplets	10	8	.556	3	Martin Dudley
Rome Romans	9	9	.500	4	Dannie Overton
Talladega Tigers	6	12	.333	7	Ed Goosetree
LaGrange Grangers	5	12	.294	7½	Heisman Jones

The league disbanded May 23.

Player statistics
Player	Team	Stat	Tot	Player	Team	Stat	Tot
W.W. Waldron	Griffin	BA	.388	E.A. Verrett	Talladega	W	4
W. W. Waldron	Griffin	Runs	21	Conrad Fields	LaGrange	SO	39
W. W. Waldron	Griffin	Hits	26	Bennett	Tri-Cities	Pct	1.000; 3-0

=== 1928 to 1930 ===
1928 Georgia–Alabama League

Team standings	W	L	PCT	GB	Managers
Cedartown Sea Cows	55	34	.618	-	W.F. Kleton / Sherry Smith
Carrollton Frogs	54	34	.614	½	Paul Fittery
Anniston Nobles	47	42	.528	8	Ben Bruner / Bud Ammons
Talladega Indians	45	43	.511	9½	Earl Hawkins / Louis Walker
Gadsden Eagles	37	49	.430	16½	Doc Newton / Joe Schepner
Lindale Dragons	26	62	.295	28½	Earl Donaldson

Playoffs: Talladega 2 games, Anniston 1, for the second half title.
Finals: Carrollton 4 games, Talladega 2.

Player statistics
Player	Team	Stat	Tot	Player	Team	Stat	Tot
Clark Taliaferro	Carrollton	BA	.392	Paul Fittery	Carrollton	W	21
Joyner White	Carrollton	Runs	92	Abe White	Carrollton	SO	141
Murray Howell	Carrollton	Hits	152	Paul Fittery	Carrollton	Pct	.913; 21-2
Joyner White	Carrollton	HR	27	Paul Fittery	Carrollton	ERA	1.60

1929 Georgia–Alabama League

Team standings	W	L	PCT	GB	Managers
Lindale Collegians	60	39	.606	-	Jack Moulton
Carrollton Champs	56	44	.560	4½	Paul Fittery
Talladega Indians	49	49	.500	10½	Howard Camp
Gadsden Eagles	49	50	.495	11	Louis Walker
Anniston Nobles	44	56	.440	16½	Bud Ammons / Verdo Elmore
Cedartown Sea Cows	40	60	.400	20½	Frank Thrasher / Sherry Smith

Playoff: Carrollton 4 games, Lindale 0.

Player statistics
Player	Team	Stat	Tot	Player	Team	Stat	Tot
Bernard Lewis	Talladega	BA	.420	James Soward	Gadsden	W	17
Charles Knowles	Cedartown	Runs	92	Abe White	Carrollton	SO	101
Bernard Lewis	Talladega	Hits	159	Paul Fittery	Carrollton	Pct	.889; 16-2
Charles Knowles	Cedartown	HR	25				

1930 Georgia–Alabama League

Team standings	W	L	PCT	GB	Managers
Lindale Pepperells	63	38	.624	-	Jack Moulton
Cedartown Braves	60	41	.594	3	Sherry Smith
Anniston Nobles	57	44	.564	6	Paul Fittery / Dixie Walker
Huntsville Springers	35	66	.347	28	Bill Pierre / Erskine Thompson / Tubby Walton / Dixie Carroll / Clarence Hart
Carrollton Champs	38	46	.452	NA	Carl East / Erskine Thomason
Talladega Indians	33	51	.393	NA	Walter Barbare / Cliff Verner

Carrollton and Talladega disbanded August 14.
Playoff: Cedartown 4 games, Lindale 3, one tie.

Player statistics
Player	Team	Stat	Tot	Player	Team	Stat	Tot
Bernard Lewis	Lindale	BA	.422	Paul Fittery	Anniston	W	16
Jack Shipley	Cedartown	Runs	131	Abe White	Lindale	SO	143
Bernard Lewis	Lindale	Hits	175	Sherry Smith	Cedartown	Pct	.875; 14-2
George Kelly	Cedartown	HR	26	Sherry Smith	Cedartown	ERA	3.34

=== 1946 to 1951 ===
1946 Georgia–Alabama League

Team standings	W	L	PCT	GB	Managers
Carrollton Hornets	75	55	.577	-	Luther Gunnells
Valley Rebels	72	58	.554	3	Cat Milner
Tallassee Indians	71	59	.546	4	Joe Heving
Newnan Brownies	68	62	.523	7	George Nix / Lloyd Brown
LaGrange Troupers	59	71	.454	16	Newton Parker / Jack Daniels
Opelika Owls	45	85	.346	30	Jim Hitchcock / Zack Sensussler

Playoffs: Tallassee 3 games, Carrollton 2; Valley 3 games, Newnan 2;
Finals: Tallassee 3 games, Valley 2.

Player statistics
Player	Team	Stat	Tot	Player	Team	Stat	Tot
Luther Gunnells	Carrollton	BA	.381	John B. Johnson	Newnan	W	20
Jack Daniels	Valley/LaGrange	Runs	118	John B. Johnson	Newnan	SO	138
Jack Daniels	Valley/LaGrange	Hits	159	Lloyd Brown	Newnan	ERA	2.17
Jack Daniels	Valley/LaGrange	RBI	122	Jack Daniels	Valley/LaGrange	HR	30

1947 Georgia–Alabama League

Team standings	W	L	PCT	GB	Attend	Managers
Carrollton Hornets	75	49	.605	-	52,245	Red Roberts
Opelika Owls	76	50	.603	-	65,173	Luther Gunnells
Valley Rebels	75	51	.595	1	79,829	Frank Luce
Newnan Brownies	72	53	.576	3½	80,600	Joe Abreu / Ed Westbrook
Tallassee Indians	62	63	.496	13½	44,693	John Hill
Griffin Pimientos	53	68	.438	20½	66,142	Abe White
LaGrange Troupers	46	78	.371	29	55,746	Carl East / Howard Ermisch
Alexander City Millers	39	86	.312	36½	34,462	Doug Taitt

Playoff: Valley 3 games, Carrollton 1; Opelika 3 games, Newnan 1;
Finals: Valley 3 games, Opelika 2.

Player statistics
Player	Team	Stat	Tot	Player	Team	Stat	Tot
Red Roberts	Carrollton	BA	.385	Paul Brock	Newnan	W	23
Ted Browning	Newnan	Runs	122	Paul Brock	Newnan	SO	220
Vern Morgan	Valley	Hits	184	Jesse Danna	Valley	ERA	2.15
Ken Guettler	Griffin	RBI	103	Ken Guettler	Griffin	HR	25

1948 Georgia–Alabama League

Team standings	W	L	PCT	GB	Attend	Managers
Valley Rebels	75	51	.595	-	60,163	Jesse Danna
Carrollton Hornets	73	53	.579	2	53,000	Red Roberts / Oliver Hill
Newnan Brownies	68	58	.540	7	65,257	Norman Veazey
Alexander City Millers	63	63	.500	12	44,053	Ben Catchings / Marvin Chappell / Luther Gunnells
Opelika Owls	62	64	.492	13	59,000	Luther Gunnells / Jim Ball
Griffin Pimientos	55	71	.437	20	63,672	Abe White / Paul Campbell
LaGrange Troupers	54	72	.429	21	53,589	James Acton
Tallassee Indians	54	72	.429	21	34,696	Hugh East / Robert Comiskey

Playoff: Valley 3 games, Newnan 1; Carrollton 3 games, Alexander City 2;
Finals: Valley 4 games, Carrollton 0.

Player statistics
Player	Team	Stat	Tot	Player	Team	Stat	Tot
Fred Campbell	Griffin	BA	.357	William Kallaher	Opelika	W	23
Robert Edwards	Valley	Runs	114	Eugene Doerflinger	Carrollton	W	23
George Bailey	Opelika	Hits	174	Eugene Doerflinger	Carrollton	SO	2.33
Fred Campbell	Griffin	RBI	105	Leon Lindsey	Alexander City	ERA	2.00
James Acton	LaGrange	HR	14				

1949 Georgia–Alabama League

Team standings	W	L	PCT	GB	Attend	Managers
Newnan Brownies	74	52	.587	-	56,976	Robert Schmidt
Alexander City Millers	69	57	.548	5	37,373	Red Roberts
Tallassee Cardinals	66	60	.524	8	43,364	Bob Comiskey / Fred Blackwell
LaGrange Troupers	65	61	.516	9	59,952	Claude Cooper
Valley Rebels	62	64	.492	12	52,859	Jesse Danna / Vern Morgan / Woody Bottoms
Opelika Owls	62	64	.492	12	44,885	Jim Ball
Carrollton Hornets	56	70	.444	18	36,029	William Seal / William Rucker
Griffin Pimientos	50	76	.397	24	47,825	Buck Etchison / Rudy York / Dee Sanders / Sam Gibson

Playoffs: Newnan 3 games, Tallassee 2; Alexander City 3 games, LaGrange 1;
Finals: Alexander City 4 games, Newnan 2.

Player statistics
Player	Team	Stat	Tot	Player	Team	Stat	Tot
Joel Chapman	Valley	BA	.351	John McFadden	Newnan	W	21
John Heusman	Alexander City	Runs	108	John McFadden	Newnan	SO	180
J. W. Spruil	Valley	Hits	153	Elmer Wallace	Newnan	ERA	2.02
Robert Schmidt	Newnan	RBI	108	Carl Franson	Newnan	HR	28

1950 Georgia–Alabama League

Team standings	W	L	PCT	GB	Attend	Managers
LaGrange Troupers	73	48	.603	-	53,781	Claude Cooper
Alexander City Millers	73	53	.579	2½	36,546	Red Roberts
Carrollton Hornets	66	57	.537	8	26,365	Doc Marshall
Newnan Brownies	62	60	.508	11½	37,215	Robert Schmidt
Valley Rebels	58	65	.472	16	31,619	Myril Hoag / Jack Daniels
Griffin Tigers	57	64	.471	16	37,167	Abe White / Jack Bearden
Opelika Owls	52	72	.419	22½	36,912	Woody Bottoms / Gene Bailey / Wheeler Flemming
Rome Red Sox	49	71	.408	23½	30,482	Norm Veazey / John Stowe / Myril Hoag

Playoffs: LaGrange 2 games, Carrollton 0; Alexander City 2 games, Newnan 0;
Finals: LaGrange 3 games, Alexander City 2.

Player statistics
Player	Team	Stat	Tot	Player	Team	Stat	Tot
Eugene Solt	Carrollton	BA	.365	Don Bessent	LaGrange	W	22
Fred DeSouza	Carrollton	Runs	149	Don Bessent	LaGrange	SO	229
Eugene Solt	Carrollton	Hits	168	Don Bessent	LaGrange	ERA	2.33
Eugene Solt	Carrollton	RBI	151				
Eugene Solt	Carrollton	HR	38				

1951 Georgia–Alabama League

Team standings	W	L	PCT	GB	Attend	Managers
LaGrange Troupers	67	47	.588	-	33,734	Claude Cooper
Valley Rebels	64	52	.552	4	37,515	George Grant
Rome Red Sox	58	57	.504	9½	41,000	Leon Culberson
Griffin Pimientos	58	58	.500	10	24,804	Mike Conte / Fred Campbell / Jack Bearden
Alexander City Millers	33	45	.423	NA	19,737	Sam Demma / Bill Brown
Opelika Owls	23	44	.343	NA	18,000	Wheeler Flemming / Gene Bailey

Opelika disbanded July 1; Alexander City disbanded July 15.

Player statistics
Player	Team	Stat	Tot	Player	Team	Stat	Tot
Joe Campbell	Griffin	BA	.379	Marvin Chappell	LaGrange	W	21
Fred Campbell	Griffin	Runs	111	Marvin Chappell	LaGrange	SO	120
Claude Shoemake	Rome	Hits	171	Joe Pennington	Valley	ERA	2.45
Claude Shoemake	Rome	RBI	135	Claude Shoemake	Rome	HR	26

== League records 1913–1951 ==
Batting
Player	Team	Stat	Tot	Yr	Player	Team	Stat	Tot	Yr
Jack Daniels	Valley/LaGrange	G	129	46	Johnny Allen	LaGrange	G	129	46
Bernard Lewis	Lindale	BA	.422	30	McDonald Turner	Newnan	AB	526	48
Fred DeSouza	Carrollton	R	149	50	Malvern Morgan	Lanett	H	184	47
Eugene Solt	Carrollton	RBI	151	50	John Stowe	Rome	2B	39	51
Earl Persons	Gadsden	3B	17	29	Eugene Solt	Carrollton	HR	38	50
Bernard Lewis	Lindale	EBH	69	30	Eugene Solt	Carrollton	TB	311	50
Jack Shipley	Cedartown	SAC	21	29	John Heusman	Alexander City	SB	85	49
Fred DeSouza	Carrollton	BB	165	50	Ted Przeworski	LaGrange/Carroll	SO	118	48

Pitching
Player	Team	Stat	Tot	Yr	Player	Team	Stat	Tot	Yr
Marvin Chappell	Alexander City	GA	51	49	Paul Brock	Newnan	CG	28	47
Bill Kallaher	Opelika	WI	23	48	Paul Brock	Newnan	WI	23	48
Gene Doerflinger	Carrollton	WI	23	48	Claude Jackson	Opelika	L	17	49
John Nabors	Talladega/New	Pct	.933-12-1	15	Paul Fittery	Carrollton	ERA	1.60	28
Paul Fittery	Carrollton	Pct	.913-21-2	28	Paul Brock	Newnan	IP	313	47
Marvin Chappell	Alexander City	ShO	6	49	Gene Doerflinger	Carrollton	SO	233	48
Mickey Mihalik	Newnam	BB	149	48					

== Sources ==
The Encyclopedia of Minor League Baseball: Second Edition via Baseball-Reference.com under GFDL.
