= Griffin Pimientos =

- 1947–1951; Griffin, Georgia

Minor league affiliations
- Class: Class D (1947–1951)
- League: Georgia–Alabama League (1947–1951)

Major league affiliations
- Team: St. Louis Browns (1948)

Minor league titles
- League titles (0): None
- Wild card berths (0): None

Team data
- Name: Griffin Pimientos (1947–1949); Griffin Tigers (1950); Griffin Pimientos (1951)
- Ballpark: Pimientos Park (1947–1951)

The Griffin Pimientos were an American minor league baseball team based in Griffin, Georgia.

From 1947 to 1951, Griffin played as members of the Class D level Georgia–Alabama League, playing the 1950 season as the Griffin "Tigers." Griffin did not advance to the playoffs in any of its five seasons. The "Pimientos" were preceded in Georgia–Alabama League play by the 1915 to 1917 Griffin Griffs.

In 1948, the "Pimientos" were a minor league affiliate of the St. Louis Browns.

Griffin hosted home minor league games at Pimiento Park. On Pimiento Avenue, the ballpark was within Griffin City Park and is still in use today.

== History ==
=== Early Griffin teams ===
The Griffin Pimientos were preceded in league play by the Griffin Lightfoots, who played from 1915 to 1917 as members of the Class D level Georgia–Alabama League. The "Griffin" team played the 1920 and 1921 seasons as members of the Class D level Georgia State League to immediately preceding the Pimientos in minor league play.

=== 1947 to 1951: Georgia–Alabama League ===
In 1947, Griffin "Pimientos" played as members of the eight–team Class D level Georgia–Alabama League, the Griffin franchise was added as the league expanded from six teams to eight, also adding the Alexander City Millers franchise. The Alexander City Millers, Carrollton Hornets, LaGrange Troupers, Newnan Brownies, Opelika Owls, Tallassee Indians and Valley Rebels joined the Pimientos in beginning league play on April 23, 1947.

The team's use of the "Pimientos" nickname corresponds to local agriculture. In the era, there were many pimiento farms in Griffin and the surrounding area. Their popularity grew because they were more resistant to the boll weevil than other crops.

In their first season of play, the Pimientos placed sixth in the 1947 Georgia–Alabama League and did not qualify for the playoffs. The team missed the playoffs in all five seasons of play. The Pimientos ended the regular season with a record of 53–66, as Abe White served as manager. Griffin finished 20.5 games behind the first-place Carrollton Hornets in the final regular season standings. Griffin's Ken Guettler led the league with both 25 Home Runs and 103 RBI.

In 1948, the Pimientos became a minor league affiliate of the St. Louis Browns for one season. The returning Abe White and Fred Campbell managed the Pimientos to another sixth place finish in the eight–team Georgia–Alabama League. Griffin ended the regular season with a 55–71 record, finishing 20.0 games behind the 1st place Valley Rebels, missing the league playoffs. Player/manager Fred Campbell won the league batting title, hitting .357 and led the Georgia–Alabama with 105 RBI.

The 1949 Pimientos finished last in the eight–team Alabama–Georgia League. Playing under managers Sam Gibson, Lewis Sanders, Buck Etchison and Rudy York, the Pimientos ended the regular season with a record of 50–76, finishing 24.0 games behind the first place Newnan Brownies. The eighth-place Griffin Pimientos did not qualify for the league playoffs.

In 1950 Griffin "Tigers" finished in sixth place in the Alabama–Georgia League regular season standings. With the returning Abe White and Jack Bearden as managers, the Tigers ended the season with a record of 57–64, finishing 16.0 games behind the first-place La Grange Troupers in the final regular season standings.

Griffin returned to the "Pimientos" nickname in their final season of play, as the 1951 Georgia–Alabama League condensed to six teams to begin the season. Griffin ended the season in fourth place, which was last after the Alexander City Millers and Opelika Owls had folded during the season. With a 58–58 record under the returning Fred Campbell and Jack Bearden as managers, Griffin finished 10.0 games behind the first-place LaGrange Troupers. No playoffs were held. Griffin player Joe Campbell won the Georgia–Alabama League batting title, hitting .379.

The Georgia–Alabama League permanently folded following the 1951 season. Griffin has not hosted another minor league team.

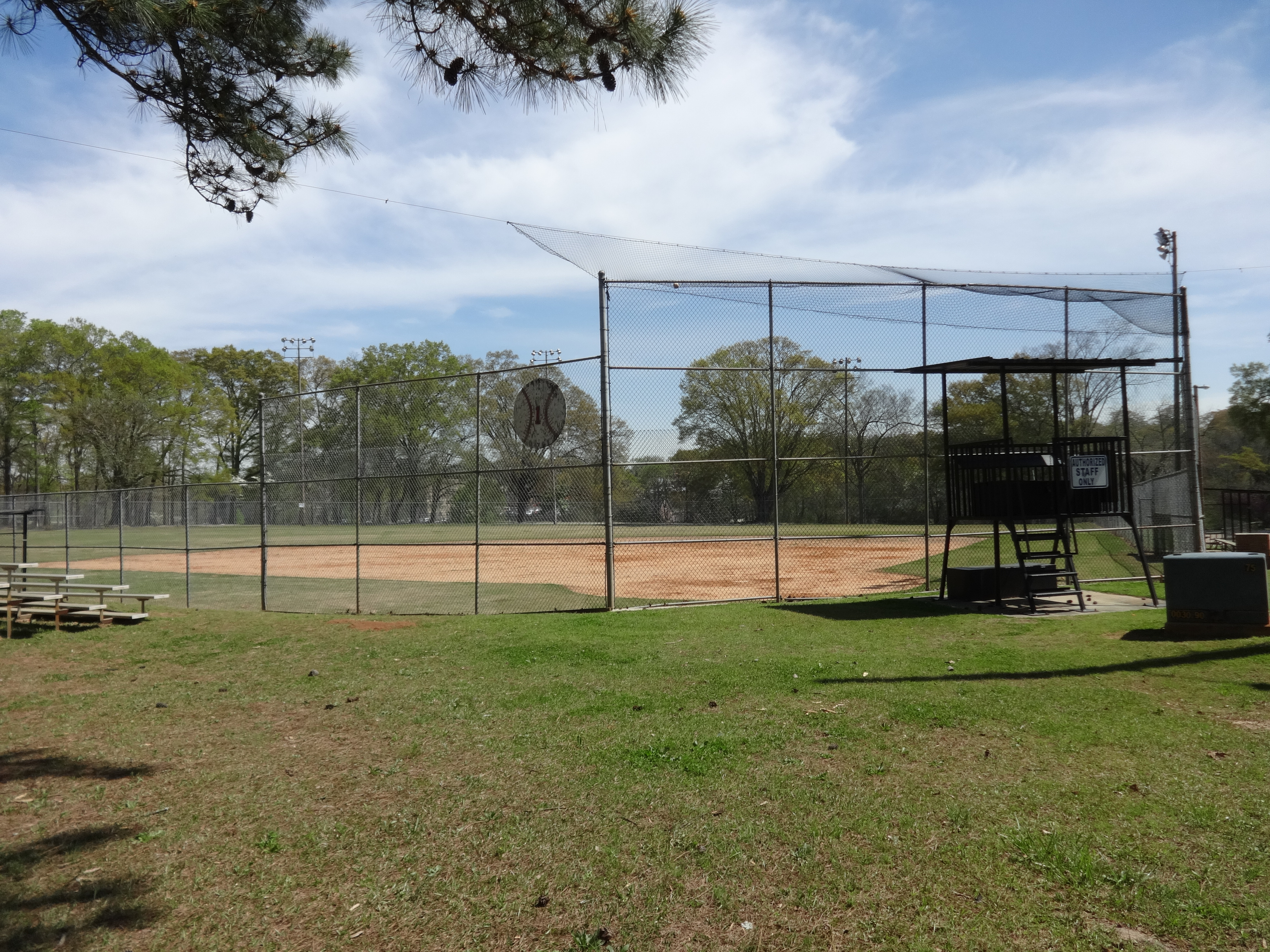
(2015) Baseball Field 1, City Park. Griffin, Georgia

== The ballpark ==
From 1947 to 1951, Griffin teams hosted minor league home games only at Pimientos Park, which had a capacity of 4,500. The ballpark location was within Griffin City Park, a 185-acre park still in use today as a public park. Griffin City Park is at 821 Pimiento Avenue in Griffin, Georgia.

== Timeline ==
Year(s)	# Yrs.	Team	Level	League	Affiliate	Ballpark
1947	1	Griffin Pimientos	Class D	Georgia–Alabama League	None	Pimientos Park
1948	1	Griffin Pimientos	Class D	Georgia–Alabama League	St. Louis Browns	Pimientos Park
1949	1	Griffin Pimientos	Class D	Georgia–Alabama League	None	Pimientos Park
1950	1	Griffin Tigers	Class D	Georgia–Alabama League	None	Pimientos Park
1951	1	Griffin Pimientos	Class D	Georgia–Alabama League	None	Pimientos Park

== Year–by–year records ==
Year	Record	Finish	Manager	Attend	Playoffs/Notes
1947	53–66	6th	Abe White	66,142	Did not qualify
1948	55–71	6th	Abe White / Fred Campbell	63,672	Did not qualify
1949	50–76	8th	Sam Gibson / Lewis Sanders / Buck Etchison / Rudy York	47,825	Did not qualify
1950	57–64	6th	Abe White / Jack Bearden	37,167	Did not qualify
1951	58–58	4th	Fred Campbell / Jack Bearden	24,804	No playoffs held

== Notable alumni ==
- Fred Campbell (1947, 1951, MGR)
- Buck Etchison (1949, MGR)
- Sam Gibson (1949, MGR)
- Ken Guettler (1947)
- Bob Rinker (1949)
- Abe White (1947-1948, 1950, MGR)
- Rudy York (1949, MGR) 7x MLB All–Star

== See also ==
- Griffin Pimientos players
