= LaGrange Troupers =

- 1946–1951; LaGrange, Georgia

Minor league affiliations
- Class: Class D (1946–1951)
- League: Georgia–Alabama League (1946–1951)

Major league affiliations
- Team: New York Yankees (1948–1951)

Minor league titles
- League titles (2): 1950; 1951
- Conference titles (1): 1950
- Wild card berths (0): None

Team data
- Name: LaGrange Troupers (1946–1951)
- Ballpark: Callaway Stadium (1946–1951)

The LaGrange Troupers were a minor league baseball team based in LaGrange, Georgia and Troup County, Georgia.

From 1946 to 1951, the LaGrange "Troupers" played as members of the Class D level Georgia–Alabama League, winning the 1950 and 1951 league championships. From 1948 to 1951, The Troupers were a minor league affiliate of the New York Yankees.

The Troupers hosted home minor league games at Callaway Stadium, which is still in use today as a sports stadium.

The Troupers were preceded in Georgia–Alabama League play by the 1916 and 1917 LaGrange Grangers.

== History ==
=== 1946 to 1949 Georgia–Alabama League ===
The LaGrange Troupers were preceded in league play by the LaGrange Grangers and LaGrange Terrapins, who played from 1913 to 1917 as members of the Class D level Georgia–Alabama League. The "LaGrange" team proceeded to play the 1920 and 1921 seasons as members of the Class D level Georgia State League to immediately precede the Troupers.

The LaGrange use of the "Troupers" nickname corresponds to the city being the county seat of Troup County.

In 1946, the LaGrange Troupers began play as members of the six–team Class D level Georgia–Alabama League, which reformed, having last played in 1930. The Carrollton Hornets, Newnan Brownies, Opelika Owls, Tallassee Indians and Valley Rebels joined LaGrange in beginning league play on April 25, 1946.

In their first season of play, the Troupers placed fifth in the Georgia–Alabama League regular season standing and did not qualify the four-team playoffs. LaGrange ended the 1946 regular season with a record of 59–71, as William Parker and Jake Daniel served as managers. The Troupers finished 16.0 games behind the first place Carrollton Hornets in the final regular season standings. Coming to LaGrange from the Valley Rebels team during the season, player/manager Jake Parker led the league with 118 runs, 159 total hits, 122 RBI and 30 home runs.

In 1947, LaGrange Troupers continued play as members of the eight–team Class D level Georgia–Alabama League, as the league expanded from six teams to eight. The Alexander City Millers and Griffin Pimientos joined the league, which began play on April 23, 1947. The Troupers placed seventh in the 1947 Georgia–Alabama League and did not qualify for the playoffs. The Troupers ended the regular season with a record of 46–78, as Carl East and Howard Ermisch served as managers. LaGrange finished 29.0 games behind the first place Carrollton Hornets in the final regular season standings.

The Troupers became a minor league affiliate of the New York Yankees for the 1948 season. Playing under manager Jim Action, the Troupers were in last place and finished in a seventh place tie in the eight–team Georgia–Alabama League, having the same record as the Tallassee Indians. Griffin ended the regular season with a 54–72 record, finishing 21.0 games behind the first place Valley Rebels, missing the league playoffs. Player/manager Fred Campbell led the Georgia–Alabama with 105 RBI and won the league batting title, hitting .357.

The 1949 Troupers continued as a New York Yankees affiliate and qualified for the Alabama–Georgia League playoffs. Playing under manager Carl Cooper, the Troupers ended the regular season with a record of 65–61, finishing 9.0 games behind the first place Newnan Brownies. The fourth place LaGrange Troupers qualified for the league playoffs, where the Alexander City Millers defeated La Grange three games to one.

=== 1950 & 1951 - Two Georgia–Alabama League championships ===
In 1950, the Troupers won the Alabama–Georgia League championship and pennant, playing their third season as a New York Yankees affiliate. With the returning Carl Cooper as manager, LaGrange ended the regular season with a record of 73–48, finishing 2.5 games ahead of the second place Alexander City Millers in the final regular season standings. In the playoffs, La Grange beat the Carrollton Hornets two games to none in the first round. In the Finals, the Troupers won the league championship in defeating the Alexander City Millers three games to two. Don Bessent of LaGrange led the league with 23 wins, 229 strikeouts and a 2.33 ERA.

In their final season of play, the 1951 LaGrange Troupers won their second consecutive Georgia–Alabama League championship as the league condensed to six teams to begin the season. LaGrange ended the season in first place after the Alexander City Millers and Opelika Owls had folded during the season, leaving the league with four teams. With a 67–47 record under the returning Carl Cooper, LaGrange finished 4.0 games ahead of the second place Valley Rebels. No playoffs were held. LaGrange pitcher Marvin Chappel led the league with 21 wins and 120 strikeouts.

The Georgia–Alabama League permanently folded following the 1951 season. LaGrange has not hosted another minor league team.

== The ballpark ==
From 1946 to 1951, the LaGrange Troopers teams hosted minor league home games exclusively at Callaway Stadium. Still in use today, the Callaway Stadium site was remodeled in 1958 by funds from the Callaway Foundation for use by the Troup County High School, LaGrange High School football and soccer teams, as well as LaGrange College football. The stadium is located at 801 Dallis Street.

== Timeline ==
Year(s)	# Yrs.	Team	Level	League	Affiliate	Ballpark
1946–1947	2	LaGrange Troupers	Class D	Georgia–Alabama League	None	Callaway Stadium
1948–1951	3	LaGrange Troupers	Class D	Georgia–Alabama League	New York Yankees	Callaway Stadium

== Year–by–year records ==
Year	Record	Finish	Manager	Attend	Playoffs/Notes
1948	59–71	5th	William Parker / Jake Daniel	NA	Did not qualify
1947	46–78	7th	Carl East / Howard Ermisch	55,746	Did not qualify
1948	54–72	7th (tie)	Jim Action	53.589	Did not qualify
1949	65–61	4th	Carl Cooper	59,951	Lost in 1st round
1950	73–48	1st	Carl Cooper	53,781	Won Pennant; League champions
1951	67–47	1st	Carl Cooper	33,734	League champions

== Notable alumni ==
- Jim Archer (1951)
- Don Bessent (1950)
- Hy Cohen (1948-1949)
- Jake Daniel (1946, MGR), (1947)
- Harold Knight (1951)
- Danny McDevitt (1951)
- Don Taussig (1950)
- Chuck Templeton (1951)
- Syd Thrift (1949)
- Walter Wilson (1947)

== See also ==
- LaGrange Troupers players
