= Rome Red Sox =

- 1950–1951; Rome, Georgia

Minor league affiliations
- Class: Class D (1950–1951)
- League: Georgia–Alabama League (1950–1951)

Major league affiliations
- Team: Washington Senators (1950)

Minor league titles
- League titles (0): None
- Wild card berths (0): None

Team data
- Name: Rome Red Sox (1950–1951)
- Ballpark: Cole Stadium (1950–1951)

The Rome Red Sox were a minor league baseball team based in Rome, Georgia.

In 1950 and 1951, the "Red Sox" played as members of the Class D level Georgia–Alabama League. Despite the nickname, the "Red Sox" were a minor league affiliate of the Washington Senators (Today's Minnesota Twins).

The Rome Red Sox hosted home minor league games at Cole Stadium, which no longer exists.

The Red Sox were preceded in Georgia–Alabama League play by the 1917 Rome-Lindale Romans and they preceded today's Rome Braves of the South Atlantic League.

== History ==
The Rome Red Sox were preceded in league play by the Rome Romans and Rome-Lindale Romans, who played from 1914 to 1917 as members of the Class D level Georgia–Alabama League. The Rome team proceeded to play the 1920 and 1921 seasons as members of the Class D level Georgia State League to immediately precede the Red Sox.

The Rome "Red Sox" rejoined the eight-team Class D level Georgia–Alabama League in 1950, after a 33-season absence from the league. Despite being called the "Red Sox," the 1950 team was a minor league affiliate of the Washington Senators. The Alexander City Millers, Carrollton Hornets, Griffin Tigers, LaGrange Troupers, Newnan Brownies, Opelika Owls and Valley Rebels joined the Red Sox in beginning regular season play on April 26, 1950.

The Red Sox finished last in the 1950 Alabama–Georgia League regular season standings. With Myril Hoag, Norman Veazey and John Stowe serving as managers, Rome ended the regular season with a record of 49–71, finishing 23.5 games behind the first place LaGrange Troupers in the final regular season standings.

In their final season of play, the Rome Red Sox placed third in the 1951 Georgia–Alabama League standings, as the league condensed to six teams to begin the season. Rome ended the season in third place after the Alexander City Millers and Opelika Owls teams had both folded during the season, leaving the league with four remaining teams. With a 58–57 record, playing the season under manager Leon Culberson, the Red Sox finished 9.5 games behind the first place LaGrange Troupers. As a player/manager and a Rome native, Culberson was in his first managerial role after a major league playing career and subsequent minor league seasons. No league playoffs were held in 1951. Rome's Claude Shoemake led the league with both 26 home runs and 135 RBI.

The Georgia–Alabama League permanently folded following the 1951 season. Rome was without minor league baseball until 2003, when the Rome Braves began play as members of the Class A level South Atlantic League.

== The ballpark ==
In 1950 and 1951, the Rome Red Sox teams hosted minor league home games exclusively at Cole Stadium. The ballpark had a capacity of 2,500 in 1950. The ballpark was demolished and is no longer in existence. Cole Stadium was located at 14th Street and Flannery Street in Rome, Georgia.

== Timeline ==
| Year(s) | # Yrs. | Team | Level | League | Affiliate | Ballpark |
|---|---|---|---|---|---|---|
| 1950 | 1 | Rome Red Sox | Class D | Georgia–Alabama League | Washington Senators | Cole Stadium |
| 1951 | 1 | Rome Red Sox | Class D | Georgia–Alabama League | None | Cole Stadium |

== Year–by–year records ==
| Year | Record | Finish | Manager | Attend | Playoffs/Notes |
|---|---|---|---|---|---|
| 1950 | 49–71 | 8th | Myril Hoag / Norman Veazey / John Stowe | 30,482 | Did not qualify |
| 1951 | 58–57 | 3rd | Leon Culberson | 41,000 | No playoffs held |

== Notable alumni ==
- Leon Culberson (1951, MGR)
- Myril Hoag (1950, MGR)
- Tony Roig (1950)

== See also ==
- Rome Red Sox players
