= Griffin Lightfoots =

- 1915–1917; Griffin, Georgia

Minor league affiliations
- Class: Class D (1915–1917)
- League: Georgia–Alabama League (1915–1917)

Major league affiliations
- Team: None

Minor league titles
- League titles (0): None
- Wild card berths (0): None

Team data
- Name: Griffin Lightfoots (1915–1916); Griffin Griffs (1917)
- Ballpark: Griffin City Park* (1915–1917)

The Griffin Lightfoots were a minor league baseball team based in Griffin, Georgia. From 1915 to 1917, Griffin played as members of the Class D level Georgia–Alabama League, playing the 1917 season as the Griffin "Griffs." The Griffs were later succeeded in Georgia–Alabama League play by the 1947 to 1951 Griffin Pimientos.

== History ==
Griffin first hosted minor league baseball in 1915, when the Griffin "Lightfoots" began minor league play as members of the six-team Class D level Georgia–Alabama League. The Anniston Moulders, LaGrange Terrapins, Newnan Cowetas, Rome Romans and Talladega Tigers teams joined Griffin in beginning league play on May 6, 1915.

In their first season of minor league play, the 1915 Griffin Lightfoots placed third in the six–team Alabama–Georgia League in a shortened season. On July 14, 1915, Griffin was in third place when the league folded for the season. The Lightfoots ended their shortened 1915 season with a record of 38–28, finishing 6.5 games behind the first place Newnan Cowetas in the final standings, as Legs Martin served as manager. Griffin pitcher Milt Watson had a record of 7–0 in the shortened season to lead the league.

The Georgia–Alabama League reformed in 1916, after folding during the previous season, in the World War I era. The 1916 Lightfoots finished in last place in the six–team league. Managed by Phil Wells and Eddie Reagan, Griffin ended the season with a record of 23–41, finishing 16.5 games behind the first place Rome Romans in the final standings, as the league ended play as scheduled on July 22, 1916.

Griffin and the Georgia–Alabama League continued play in 1917, as the Griffin team became known as the "Griffs." The season was short lived, beginning play on May 3, 1917, and concluding on May 23, 1917, when the league folded. The Griffs were in second place with a 10–7 record when the league folded. Harry Mathews was the manager as Griffin ended their 1917 season 1.5 games behind the first place Anniston Moulders in the final standings. Griffins W.W. Waldron won the Georgia–Alabama League batting title in the shortened season, hitting .388. Waldron also led the league with both 21 runs scored and 26 total hits.

The Griffin Griffs were succeeded by the "Griffin"team that played in the 1920 and 1921 seasons as members of the Class D level Georgia State League. Griffin next hosted minor league baseball, when the 1947 Griffin Pimientos returned to play in the reformed Class D level Georgia–Alabama League.

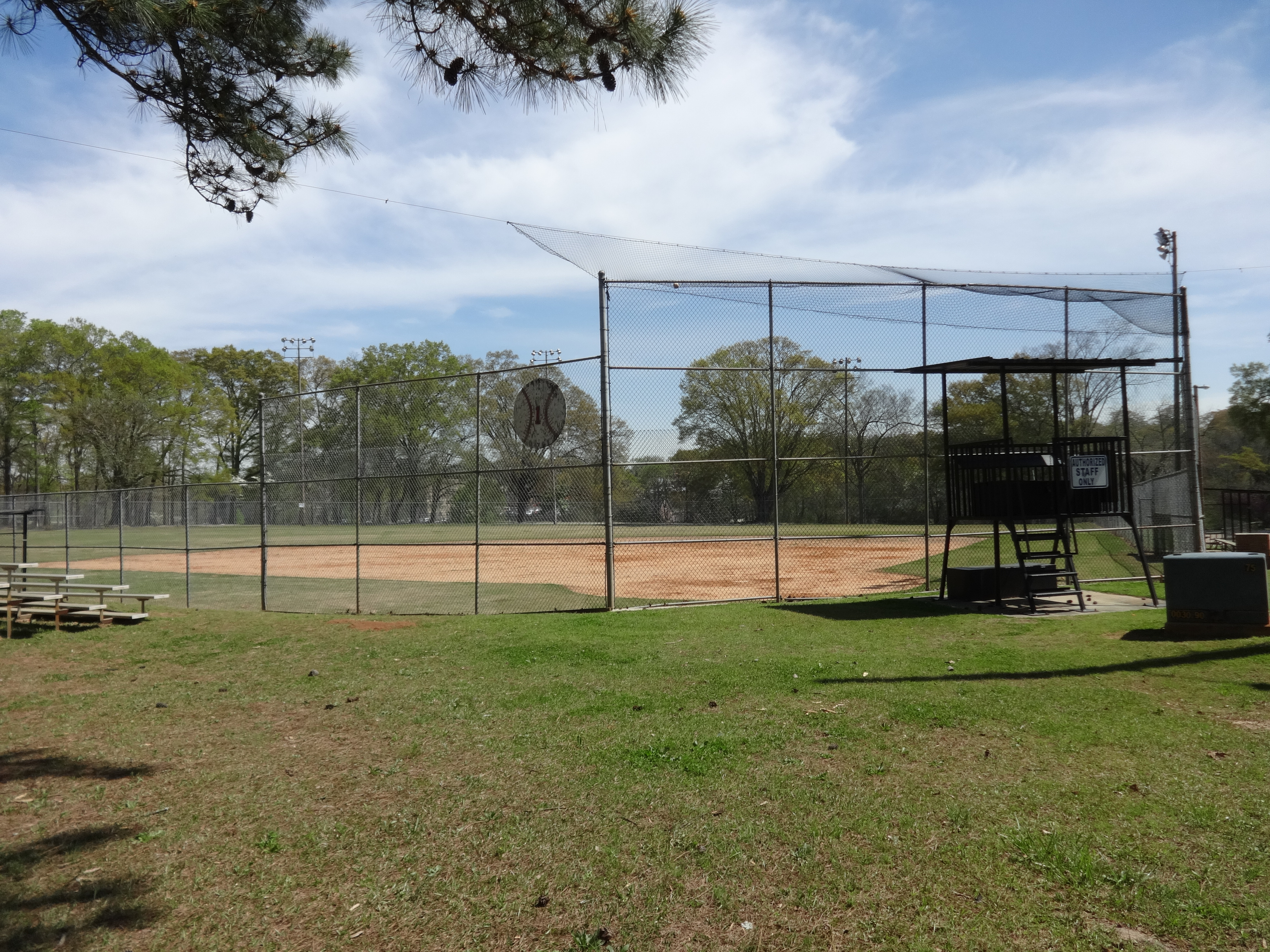
(2015) Baseball field 1, City Park. Griffin, Georgia

== The ballpark ==
The name of the home ballpark for the Griffin Lightfoots and Griffs is not directly referenced. The Griffin minor league teams later hosted home games exclusively at Pimientos Park, with the ballpark being within Griffin City Park. The 185 acre City Park was established in 1840 with the city and was in use as a public park during the era of the Lightfoots and Griffs. Still in use today, the park location is 821 Pimento Avenue.

== Timeline ==
| Year(s) | # Yrs. | Team | Level | League |
|---|---|---|---|---|
| 1915-1916 | 2 | Griffin Lightfoots | Class D | Georgia–Alabama League |
| 1917 | 1 | Griffin Griffs | Class D | Georgia–Alabama League |

== Year–by–year records ==
| Year | Record | Finish | Manager | Playoffs/Notes |
|---|---|---|---|---|
| 1915 | 38–28 | 3rd | Legs Martin | No playoffs held |
| 1916 | 23–41 | 6th | Phil Wells / Eddie Reagan | No playoffs held |
| 1917 | 10–7 | 2nd | Harry Matthews | No playoffs held |

== Notable alumni ==
- Lou Jorda (1915)
- Fred Ostendorf (1915)
- Bob Vines (1917)

== See also ==
- Griffin Lightfoots players
