= Cedartown Sea Cows =

- 1928–1929; (1928–1930); Cedartown, Georgia

Minor league affiliations
- Class: Class D (1928–1930)
- League: Georgia-Alabama League (1928–1930)

Major league affiliations
- Team: None

Minor league titles
- League titles (1): 1930
- Conference titles (1): 1928

Team data
- Name: Cedartown Sea Cows (1928-1929); Cedartown Braves (1930)
- Ballpark: Peek Park*

The Cedartown Sea Cows were a minor league baseball team based in Cedartown, Georgia. Cedartown teams played as members of the Class D level Georgia-Alabama League from 1928 to 1930, winning one league pennant and one league championship. The 1930 team became known as the "Braves."

== History ==
The Sea Cows were preceded in minor league baseball by the Cedartown Cedars, who played as members of the Class D level Georgia State League in the 1921 and 1922 seasons.

In 1928, Cedartown resumed minor league play, as the "Sea Cows" were formed and became members of the reformed six-team, Class D level Georgia-Alabama League. The Anniston Nobles, Carrollton Frogs, Gadsden Eagles, Lindale Dragons and Talladega Indians teams joined Cedartown in beginning league play on May 24, 1928.

In their first season of Georgia-Alabama League play, the Sea Cows had the best overall record in the league. Cedartown did not qualify for the league playoff, as the league played a spilt-season schedule. The Sea Cows ended the season with an overall record of 55–34 record, playing under manager Sherry Smith, who would manage the team in all three seasons. The Cedartown record was the best in the league, as the Sea Cows finished 0.5 game ahead of the second place Carrolton Frogs in the overall regular season standings. In the playoff, the split-season winners met, with Carrolton defeating Talladega the win the league championship.

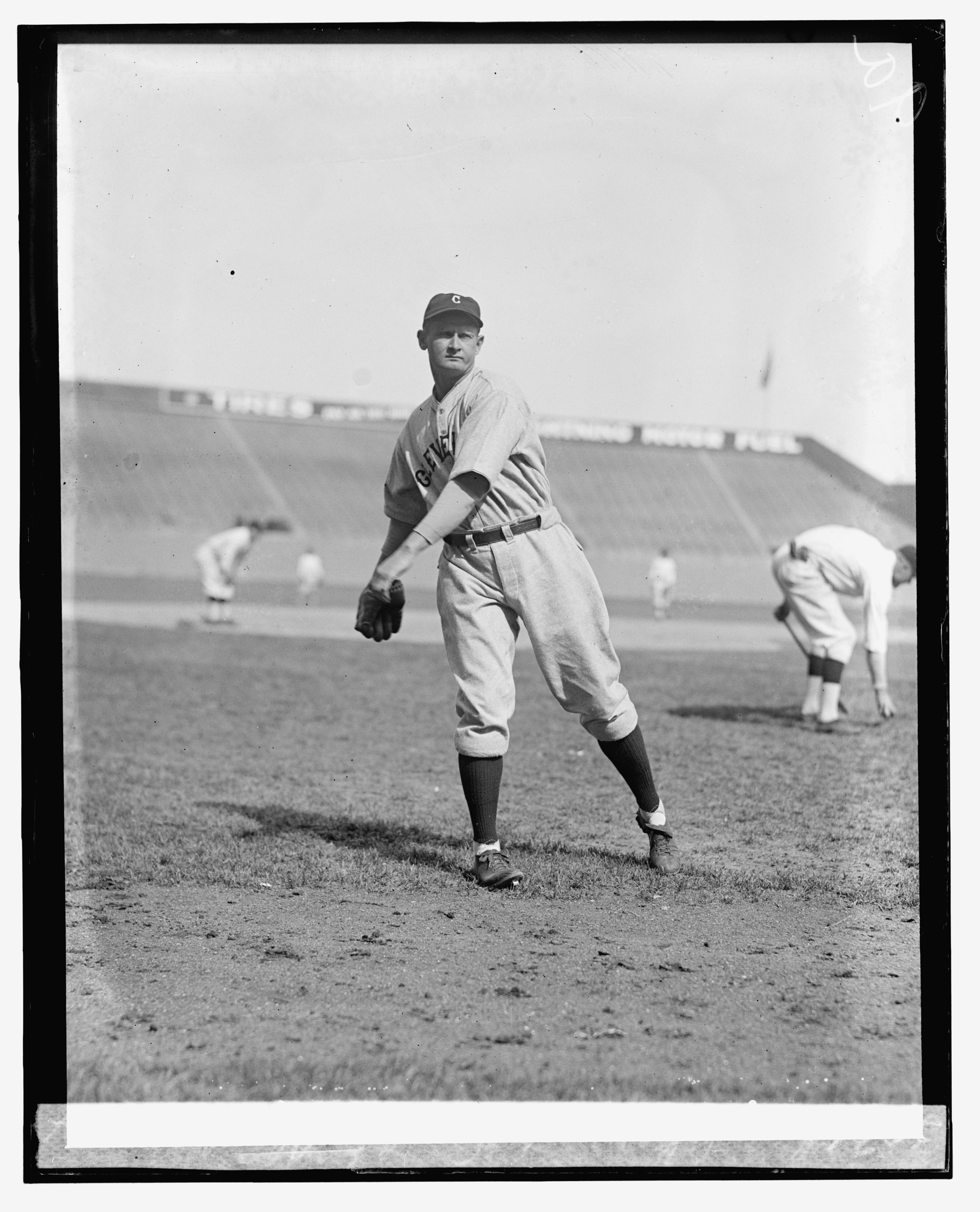
(1924) Sherry Smith, Cleveland Indians. Smith was player-manager for the Cedartown Sea Cows from 1928 to 1930.

The 1929 Cedartown Sea Cows finished last in the Georgia-Alabama League standings. The Sea Cows finished in sixth place in the regular season, with a 40–60 record. Playing under managers Shelly Smith and Buck Thrasher, Cedartown finished 20.5 games behind the first place Lindale Collegians in the six–team league regular season standings. In the playoff, Carrollton swept Lindale in four games and won their second championship. Charles Knowles of Cedartown hit a league leading 25 home runs and also led the league with 92 runs scored.

In their final season of minor league play, the 1930 Cedartown "Braves" won the Georgia-Alabama League championship. With a 60–41 record, the Braves placed second in the regular season standings. Cedartown finished 3.0 games behind the first place Lindale Pepperels, playing under returning manager Shelley Smith. In the playoff, Cedartown defeated Lindale 4 games to 3 to claim the championship. Player/Manager Shelly Smith led the Georgia-Alabama League with a 14–2 record and an era of 3.34.

The Georgia-Alabama League folded after the 1930 season. Cedartown has not hosted another minor league baseball team.

== The ballpark ==
The name of the Cedartown Sea Cows and Braves' minor league home ballpark is not directly referenced. It is known that Peek Park was in use as a public park in the era. Peek Park was built on land donated by Captain J.A. Peek. Still in use today as a public park, Peek Park is located on North College Street.

== Timeline ==
Year(s)	# Yrs.	Team	Level	League
1928-1929	1	Cedartown Sea Cows	Class D	Georgia-Alabama League
1930	1	Cedartown Braves	Class D	Georgia-Alabama League

== Year–by–year records ==
Year	Record	Finish	Manager	Playoffs/Notes
1928	55–34	1st	Sherry Smith	won League pennant Did not qualify
1929	40–60	6th	Buck Thrasher / Sherry Smith	Did not qualify
1930	60–41	2nd	Sherry Smith	League champions

== Notable alumni ==
- Sherry Smith (1928-1930, MGR)
- Ray Treadaway (1928)
