= Newnan Cowetas =

- 1913–1916; Newnan, Georgia

Minor league affiliations
- Class: Class D (1913–1916)
- League: Georgia–Alabama League (1913–1916)

Major league affiliations
- Team: None

Minor league titles
- League titles (1): 1915

Team data
- Name: Newnan Cowetas (1913–1916)
- Ballpark: Lee Park (1913–1916)

The Newnan Cowetas were a minor league baseball team based in Newnan, Georgia and Coweta County, Georgia.

From 1913 to 1916, the Cowetas played as members of the Class D level Georgia–Alabama League, winning the 1915 league championship and finishing in second place in the other three seasons of their league play. The Cowetas were succeeded in Georgia–Alabama League play by the 1946 to 1950 Newnan Brownies.

The Newnan Cowetas hosted home minor league games at Lee Park, which is still in use today as a public park.

At age 16, Baseball Hall of Fame member Bill Terry played for the 1915 Newnan Cowetas in his first professional season and returned to the team in 1916.

== History ==
In 1913, the Newnan "Cowetas" began play as charter members of the six–team, Class D level Georgia–Alabama League. The Anniston Moulders, Gadsden Steel Makers, LaGrange Terrapins, Opelika Opelicans and Talladega Indians teams joined Newnan in beginning league play on May 5, 1913.

The "Cowetas" team nickname corresponds to the city of Newnan being located within Coweta County, while serving as the county seat and housing the Coweta County Courthouse.

In their first season of play, the Cowetas placed second in the Georgia–Alabama League final standings. Newnan ended the 1913 season with a record of 46–44, as Emory Bagwell and Ed Shulze served as managers. The Cowetas finished 5.5 games behind the first place Gadsden Steel Makers in the final standings, as the league held no playoffs. Midge Craven of Newnan led the league with 121 total hits.

Continuing play in the 1914 Georgia–Alabama League, the Cowetas again placed second in the final standings as the league expanded. The Cowetas ended the 1914 season with a record of 47–37, to be the runner–up in the standings of the eight–team league. War Sanders served as manager, as Newnan finished 3.0 games behind the first place Selma River Rats in the final standings. Newnan's Lloyd Howell won the league batting championship, hitting .332.

On May 10, 1915, at 3:30 P.M., Lee Park hosted the Newnan Cowetas' home opener against La Grange. Admission was 0.25 cents, with an extra 0.15 cents for a grandstand seat. Local businesses closed at 3:00 in order for owners and patrons to attend the ballgame.

The 1915 Newnan Cowetas won the six–team Alabama–Georgia League championship in a shortened season. On July 14, 1915, Newnan was in first place when the league folded. The Cowetas ended their shortened 1915 season with a record of 39–20, finishing 1.0 game ahead of the second place Talladega Tigers. Harry Mathews served as manager. Manager Harry Mathews received $50.00 in gold from Newnan fans before the final game of the season. Newnan's Don Flinn hit .358 to win the league batting title, while hitting 15 home runs, also tops in the league.

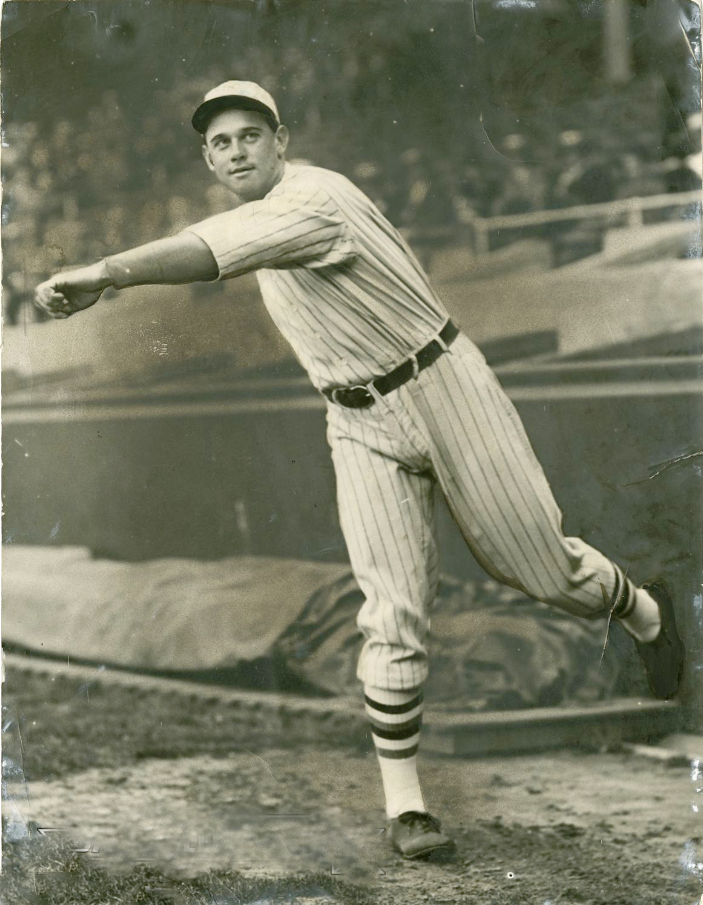
(1923) Baseball Hall of Fame member Bill Terry. New York Giants. Beginning at age 16, Terry played for the Newnan Cowetas in 1915 and 1916 in his first professional seasons.

At age 16, future Baseball Hall of Fame member Bill Terry played for Newnan in 1915, in his first professional season. Terry compiled a 7–1 record, with a 0.60 ERA, in 8 games as a pitcher, while hitting .143 in 28 at-bats for the Cowetas. Terry was first discovered and then scouted by New York Yankees scout Bobby Gilks, who was at Cowetas games to scout other players, mainly teammate Jack Nabors, who had pitched a 13 inning no–hitter against Talladega on June 15, 1915. Gilks also scouted and signed Shoeless Joe Jackson and Hall of Fame member Dave Bancroft. Terry was noticed when he threw a no–hitter of his own on June 30, 1915, defeating Anniston 2–0.

Despite folding during the season before, the Georgia–Alabama League reformed in 1916, with Newnan continuing as a member. In their final season, the 1916 Cowetas finished in second place for the third time in four seasons. With Harry Mathews returning as manager, Newnan ended the season with a record of 41–26, finishing 3.0 games behind the first place Rome Romans in the final standings, as the league ended play early as scheduled on July 22, 1916. Don Flinn of Newnan hit .365 to lead the league for the second straight season, while teammate R.Y Watkins won 15 games, leading the league.

Bill Terry played a second season for Newnan in 1916, at age 17. Terry had a 11–8 record, with a 2.48 ERA as a pitcher, while hitting .238 with 5 home runs. After playing a successful 1917 season, Terry unexpectedly quit minor league baseball for two seasons, before returning to the game and evolving into a Hall of Fame hitter for the New York Giants.

The Georgia–Alabama League continued play in 1917, but without a Newnan franchise. Newnan was replaced by the Tri-Cities Triplets franchise in the six-team league.

Newnan next hosted minor league baseball 30 years later, when the 1946 Newnan Brownies returned to play in the reformed Class D level Georgia–Alabama League, hosting home games at Pickett Field.

== The ballpark ==
The Newnan Cowetas teams hosted home minor league home games exclusively at Lee Park. Today, the site is still in use as a public park, hosting the "House of Pickleball" facilities. It is located at 4 Joseph-Hannah Boulevard in Newnan, Georgia.

== Timeline ==
Year(s)	# Yrs.	Team	Level	League	Ballpark
1913–1916	4	Newnan Cowetas	Class D	Georgia–Alabama League	Lee Park

== Year–by–year records ==
Year	Record	Finish	Manager	Playoffs/Notes
1913	46–44	2nd	Emory Bagwell / Ed Shulze	No playoffs held
1914	57–37	2nd	War Sanders	No playoffs held
1915	39–20	1st	Harry Mathews	League champions League folded July 14
1916	41–26	2nd	Harry Mathews	No playoffs held

== Notable alumni ==
- Bill Terry (1915–1916) Inducted Baseball Hall of Fame, 1954
- Lloyd Christenbury (1916)
- Bud Davis (1916)
- Don Flinn (1915–1916)
- Jakie May (1914)
- Jack Nabors (1915)
- Jim Poole (1914)
- George Rohe (1913)
- War Sanders (1914, MGR)

== See also ==
- 1915 Lee Park opening game
- Newnan Cowetas players
