= Newnan Brownies =

- 1946–1950; Newnan, Georgia

Minor league affiliations
- Class: Class D (1946–1950)
- League: Georgia–Alabama League (1946–1950)

Major league affiliations
- Team: None

Minor league titles
- League titles (0): None
- Conference titles (1): 1949
- Wild card berths (4): 1946; 1947; 1948; 1950

Team data
- Name: Newnan Brownies (1946–1950)
- Ballpark: Pickett Field (1946–1940)

The Newnan Brownies were a minor league baseball team based in Newnan, Georgia. From 1946 to 1950, the Brownies played as members of the Class D level Georgia–Alabama League, winning the 1949 league pennant and qualifying for the playoffs in all five seasons of play. The Brownies were preceded in Georgia–Alabama League play by the 1913 to 1916 Newnan Cowetas.

The Newnan Brownies teams hosted home minor league games at Pickett Field, which is still in use today, located within Lynch Park.

== History ==
The Brownies were preceded in minor league play by the Newnan Cowetas, who played from 1913 to 1916 as charter members of the Class D level Georgia–Alabama League, hosting home games at Lee Park.

In 1946, the Newnan "Brownies" began play as members of the six–team Class D level Georgia–Alabama League, which reformed, having last played in 1930. The Carrollton Hornets, LaGrange Troupers, Opelika Owls, Tallassee Indians and Valley Rebels teams joined Newnan in beginning league play on April 25, 1946.

In their first season of play, the Brownies placed fourth in the Georgia–Alabama League and qualified for the playoffs, which the team would do in all five seasons of play. Newnan ended the 1946 regular season with a record of 68–62, as George Nix and Lloyd Brown served as managers, after Brown was signed to relieve Nix as manager and pitch for the Brownies in May. The Brownies finished 7.0 games behind the first place Carrollton Hornets in the final regular season standings. In the playoffs, Valley defeated Newnan 3 games to 2 in their 1st round series. Newnan player/manager Lloyd Brown led the league with a 2.17 ERA and teammate John Johnson won 20 games with 138 strikeouts, to lead the league in both categories.

Continuing play in the 1947 Georgia–Alabama League, the Browns again qualified for the playoffs, as the league expanded to eight teams. The Cowetas ended the 1914 season with a record of 72–53, to place fourth in the standings of the eight–team league. Joe Abreu and John Westbrook served as managers, as Newnan finished 3.5 games behind the first place Carrollton Hornets in the final regular season standings. In the playoffs, the Opelika Owls defeated Newnan 3 games to 1 in the first round. Newnan's Paul Brock led the league with both 23 wins and 220 strikeouts.

At the home opener in 1948, Newnan Mayor Earl Joiner threw out the first pitch. In 1948, Norman Veazey managed the Brownies to a third place finish in the eight–team Georgia–Alabama League. Newnan ended the regular season with a 68–58 record, finishing 7.0 games behind the first place Valley Rebels. In the playoffs, Valley defeated Newnan 3 games to 1 in the first round, ending their season.

The 1949 Newnan Brownies won the pennant in the eight–team Alabama–Georgia League. Playing under manager Joe Schmidt season with a record of 74–52, finishing 7.0 games ahead of the second place Alexander City Millers. In the first round of the playoffs, Newnan defeated the Tallassee Cardinals 3 games to 2, before losing in the finals. Alexander City defeated the Brownies 4 games to 2 in the finals to win the league championship. Newnan had four league leaders in 1949: Player/manager Joe Schmidt with 108 RBI, Carl Franson with 28 Home Runs, John McFadden with both 21 wins and 180 strikeouts and Elmer Wallace with a 2.02 ERA.

In their final season, the 1950 Brownies finished in fourth place and qualified for the playoffs for the fifth consecutive season. With Joe Schmidt returning as manager, Newnan ended the season with a record of 62–60, finishing 11.0 games behind the first place La Grange Troupers in the final regular season standings. In their final games, Newnan was defeated by the Alexander City Millers 2 games to 0 in the first round of the playoffs.

The Georgia–Alabama League continued play in 1951, but without the Newnan Brownies franchise, as the league condensed to six teams, with the Carrollton Hornets also disbanding. Newnan has not hosted another minor league team.

== The ballpark ==
The Newnan Brownies hosted minor league home games exclusively at Pickett Field. The ballpark had a capacity of 3,500. Today, the Pickett Field is still in use as a baseball facility, with the ballpark site having been renovated in 2021. Pickett Field is located within Lynch Park on the corner of Duncan Street and Wesley Street in Newnan, Georgia.

== Timeline ==
Year(s)	# Yrs.	Team	Level	League	Ballpark
1946–1950	5	Newnan Brownies	Class D	Georgia–Alabama League	Pickett Field

== Year–by–year records ==
Year	Record	Finish	Manager	Attend	Playoffs/Notes
1946	68–62	4th	George Nix / Lloyd Brown	82,000	Lost in 1st round
1947	72–53	4th	Joe Abreu / John Westbrook	80,600	Lost in 1st round
1948	68–58	3rd	Norman Veazey	65,187	Lost in 1st round
1949	74–52	1st	Joe Schmidt	56,976	Won pennant Lost in finals
1950	62–260	4th	Joe Schmidt	37,215	Lost in 1st round

== Notable alumni ==
- Joe Abreu (1947, MGR)
- Lloyd Brown (1946, MGR)
- Jake Daniel (1947)
- Oliver Hill (1947)

== See also ==
- Newnan Brownies players
