= LaGrange Grangers =

- 1916–1917; (1913–1917); LaGrange, Georgia

Minor league affiliations
- Class: Class D (1913–1917)
- League: Georgia–Alabama League (1913–1917)

Major league affiliations
- Team: None

Minor league titles
- League titles (0): None

Team data
- Name: LaGrange Terrapins (1913–1915); LaGrange Grangers (1916–1917)
- Ballpark: LaGrange Athletic Field (1913–1917)

The LaGrange Grangers were a minor league baseball team based in LaGrange, Georgia. From 1913 to 1917, the Grangers and their predecessor, the LaGrange "Terrapins," played exclusively as members of the Class D level Georgia–Alabama League.

The LaGrange Grangers hosted home minor league games at the LaGrange Athletic Field.

The Grangers were succeeded in Georgia–Alabama League play decades later by the 1946 LaGrange Troupers.

== History ==
In 1913, the LaGrange "Terrapins" began play as charter members of the six–team, Class D level Georgia–Alabama League. The Anniston Moulders, Gadsden Steel Makers, Newnan Cowetas, Opelika Opelicans and Talladega Indians teams joined LaGrange in beginning league play on May 5, 1913.

In their first season of play, the Terrapins placed fifth in the 1913 Georgia–Alabama League standings. LaGrange ended the season with a record of 42–48, as Ducky Holmes served as manager. The Terrapins finished 9.5 games behind the first place Gadsden Steel Makers in the final standings, as the league held no playoffs.

Continuing play in the 1914 Georgia–Alabama League, the Terrapins placed third in the final standings, as the league expanded to eight teams for one season. The Terrapins ended the 1914 season with a record of 55–43, to place third in the standings of the eight–team league. Jim Lafitte served as manager, as LaGrange finished 6.5 games behind the first place Selma River Rats in the final standings.

The 1915 LaGrange Terrapins finished last in the six–team Alabama–Georgia League. On July 14, 1915, LaGrange was in sixth place when the league folded. The Terrapins ended their shortened 1915 season with a record of 18–38, finishing 21.0 games behind the first place Newnan Cowetas, as Jim Lafitte returned as manager.

Despite folding during the season before, the Georgia–Alabama League reformed in 1916, with LaGrange continuing play as the LaGrange "Grangers."

The "Grangers" nickname corresponds to its use by LaGrange High School, established in 1903.

With Grady Bowen as manager, the Grangers placed third in the six-team league. LaGrange ended the season with a record of 39–29, finishing 5.5 games behind the first place Rome Romans in the final standings, as the league ended play on July 22, 1916. Rufus Nolly of LaGrange had a 12-2 pitching record, leading the league.

LaGrange and the Georgia–Alabama League continued play in 1917. The season was short lived, beginning play on May 3, 1917, and concluding on May 23, 1917, when the league folded. The Grangers were in last place with a 5–12 record when the league folded. Heisman Jones was the manager as LaGrange ended their 1917 season in sixth place, finishing 5.5 games behind the first place Anniston Moulders in the final standings.

The LaGrange Grangers were succeeded in minor league play by the 1920 and 1921 "LaGrange" team that played as members of the Class D level Georgia State League, winning the 1920 league championship. LaGrange next hosted minor league baseball when the 1946 LaGrange Troupers returned to play in the reformed Class D level Georgia–Alabama League, hosting home games at Callaway Stadium.

== The ballpark ==
From 1913 to 1917, the LaGrange Terrapins and Grangers teams hosted minor league home games exclusively at the LaGrange Athletic Field. The ballpark was located at West Battle & West Haralson Street at North Greenwood Street & Gordon Street in LaGrange, Georgia.

== Timeline ==
Year(s)	# Yrs.	Team	Level	League	Ballpark
1913–1915	3	LaGrange Terrapins	Class D	Georgia–Alabama League	LaGrange Athletic Field
1916–1917	2	LaGrange Grangers	Class D	Georgia–Alabama League	LaGrange Athletic Field

== Year–by–year records ==
Year	Record	Finish	Manager	Playoffs/Notes
1913	42–48	5th	Ducky Holmes	No playoffs held
1914	55–438	3rd	Jim Lafitte	No playoffs held
1915	18–38	6th	Jim Lafitte	League folded July 14
1916	39–29	3rd	Grady Bowen	No playoffs held
1917	5–12	6th	Heisman Jones	League folded May 23

== Notable alumni ==
- Ralph Head (1913–1915)
- Ducky Holmes (1913, MGR)
- LaGrange Terrapins players
