= Carl East =

American baseball player (1894–1953)

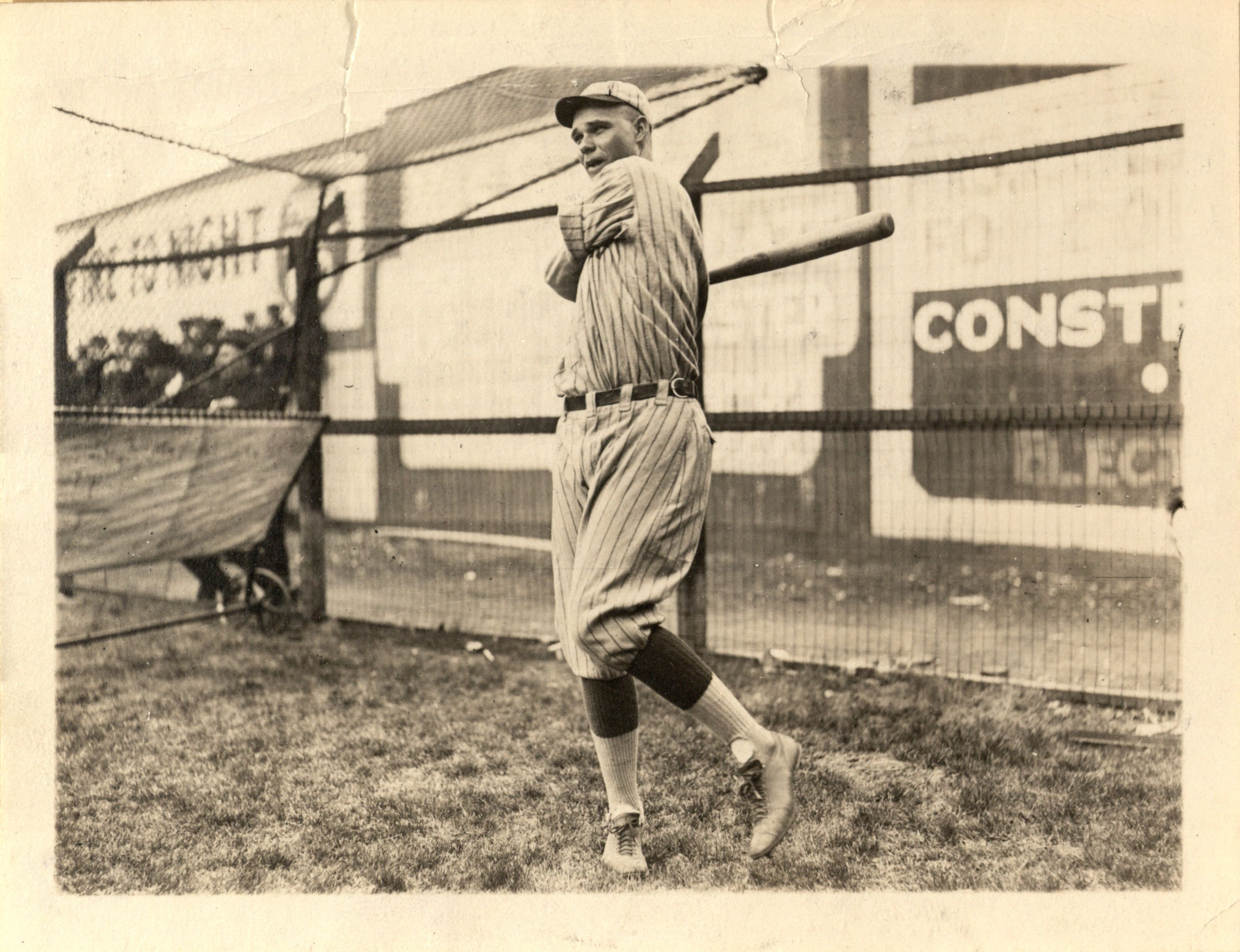
- Outfielder / Pitcher
- Born: August 27, 1894; Marietta, Georgia, US
- Died: January 15, 1953 (aged 58); Whitesburg, Georgia, US
- Batted: Left Threw: Right

MLB debut
- August 24, 1915, for the St. Louis Browns

Last MLB appearance
- May 3, 1924, for the Washington Senators

MLB statistics
- Games played: 3
- Batting average: .286
- Earned run average: 16.20
- Stats at Baseball Reference

Teams
- St. Louis Browns (1915); Washington Senators (1924)

Carlton William East (August 27, 1894 – January 15, 1953) was an American professional baseball player. His career of being an outfielder and pitcher in Major League Baseball (MLB) and Minor League Baseball (MiLB) spanned nearly two decades. He played for the St. Louis Browns and Washington Senators. He later became the manager and president of the Georgia-Alabama League in 1946.

== Early life ==
Carl East was born in Marietta, Georgia on August 27, 1894. He was third eldest of eight children and the second son born to William M. East (1866-1932), a farmer, and Mary East (née Allen). His father married his second wife, Della (1887-1975), in 1917.

East had five full siblings, including (sisters: Rilla (b.1885), Viola Rebecca (b.1895), Jessie (b.1901), and Ellen (b.1915) & brother: Otis (b.1889)) and two half-siblings (sister: Marjorie (b.1918) and brother: Howard (b.1920)).

== Professional baseball ==
Minor league: 1912-1924; 1928-1931

Starting in 1912, East began his career with the 1912 Lindale, Georgia minor league baseball team, which at the time was managed by Lillian Duke. He soon moved on to play for the Rome Romans as a pitcher for the 1912-1913 seasons.

After his stint with the Romans, he became a rightfielder and pitcher for the Montgomery Rebels (later the Thomasville Hornets) during the 1914 season. In the summer of 1915, he was called up to the major leagues to play with the St. Louis Browns. East was sent back down to the minors following one game with the Browns. This led him to start with the Lincoln Tigers (later the Lincoln Links) for the 1916-1917 seasons. In 1919, East was with the Sioux City Indians as a pitcher and outfielder.

In the 1920s, East found a home in Witchita for a few seasons. He was with the Witchita Jobbers (later the Witchita Witches) for the 1920-1922 seasons. During his first season in Witchita, East ended up in a collison with future hall of famer Jocko Conlan. He was knocked unconscious, but he continued in the game once recovered.

East later moved on to Minneapolis to play for the Minneapolis Millers during the 1923 season, and he returned to them for the 1928 season. This return followed his time playing independent "outlaw" ball in Beloit, Wisconsin with the Mid-West League.

For the final few years of his minor league career, East went back down to the south as an outfielder. For the 1929 season, he played for the Chattanooga Lookouts. The 1930 season saw him as the playing manager of Carrollton, Georgia (Georgia-Alabama League) and finishing the year with the Anniston Nobles. In 1931, his final season as a professional baseball player was with the Spartanburg Spartans.

Major league: St. Louis Browns (1915), Washington Senators (1924)

St. Louis Browns (1915)

Carl East's career in major league baseball began on August 24, 1915. He was called up to start as a pitcher for the St. Louis Browns in game one of a double header against the Philadelphia Athletics. In the game, East pitched for 3 and 1/3 innings. He struck out one and walked two. At the same time, he allowed six runs on six hits. Manager Branch Rickey pulled him from the game.

Washington Senators (1924)

East's career in major league baseball got another chance in 1924. He was traded to the Washington Senators by the Minneapolis Millers (American Association) on April 28, 1924 in exchange for Clarence Fisher. The trade was voided on May 15, 1924.

He played two games with the Senators in May 1924 taking up the right field position. The games took place at Yankee Stadium as the Senators faced off against the Yankees on the road.

== Career records ==
East was a minor league staple when it came to his records and leads. He was awarded the Silver Bat award (awarded to Minor League batting champions from 1934 to 1948).

When compiled, he had the fourth highest batting average among minor leaguers. His career average was a .367 over 800 games played.

During his time in the Mid-West League (1924-1928), East was the leading hitter and right fielder for Beloit's Fairbanks Fairies (a factory team). In 1916, he led the Western League with 24 wins as pitcher. In 1923, he led the American Association with 31 home runs. In the Georgia-Alabama League, he hit a .434 and led the batting average.

== Personal life ==
East left the minor baseball league in December 1917 to fulfill his World War I service for the United States. He returned to the league in 1919.

After retiring from playing, East worked as a life insurance agent in Carroll County, Georgia. He continued this career path before becoming the manager and president of the reinstated Georgia-Alabama League in 1946.

Carl East was married twice during his life. His first marriage was to Elizabeth "Lizzie" McIntyre Goswick (1894-1931) in late 1914. They later divorced in October 1915. The couple only had one child, a daughter.

East remarried to his second wife in 1922. He married Elizabeth Rebecca "Reba" Driver (1900 -1979). The couple had no children.

== Death ==
Carl East died of heart failure on January 15, 1953 at age 59 in Whitesburg, Georgia.
