= Joe Abreu =

American baseball player (1913–1993)

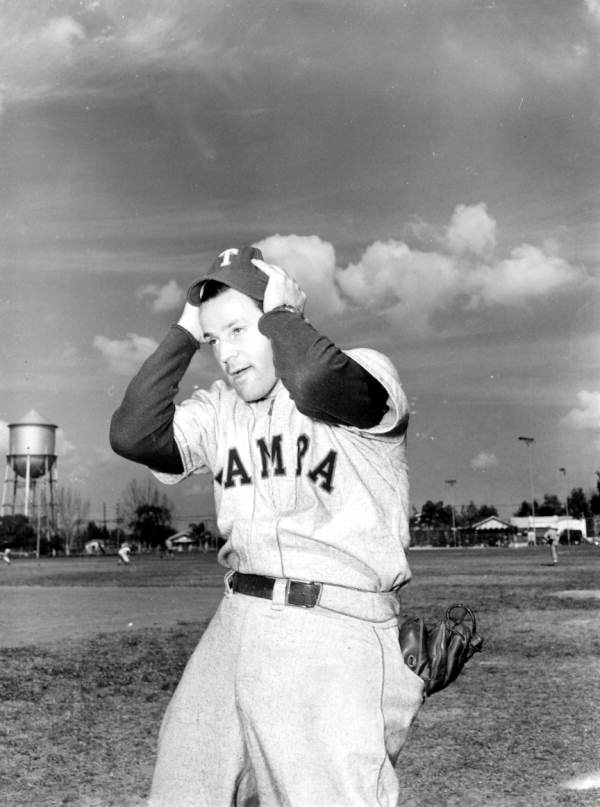
- Abreu reacts to a bad play, 1948
- Utility player
- Born: May 24, 1913; Oakland, California, U.S.
- Died: March 17, 1993 (aged 79); Hayward, California, U.S.
- Batted: Right Threw: Right

MLB debut
- April 23, 1942, for the Cincinnati Reds

Last MLB appearance
- July 11, 1942, for the Cincinnati Reds

MLB statistics
- Batting average: .214
- Home runs: 1
- Runs batted in: 3
- Stats at Baseball Reference

Teams
- Cincinnati Reds (1942)

Joseph Lawrence Abreu (May 24, 1913 – March 17, 1993) was an American Major League Baseball infielder. He played nine seasons in professional baseball, one at the major league level. He served in the United States Navy during World War II.

== Early life ==
Abreu was the sixth of nine children in his family, and his parents immigrated from Portugal in 1906.

He was born on May 24, 1913, in Oakland, California. Abreu had three brothers who were professional boxers. Abreu graduated from McClymonds High School in 1934, and after graduation, Abreu coached a local American Legion Baseball team. He spent the summer of 1935 working as a handyman at wholesale liquor firm in San Francisco, California. That summer, he played semi-professional baseball with the Central Banks of the Berkeley City League where he attracted attention from many professional scouts.

== Professional career ==
=== New York Yankees ===
In 1936, Abreu began his professional career with the Yakima Pippins where he batted .396, helping them win the Northwest League pennant. The next season, Abreu split time between the Class-B Spokane Hawks, and the Class-AA Oakland Oaks. With the Hawks, he hit .324 with 23 doubles, 12 triples, and 4 home runs in 91 games. He led the team in triples, was second in batting average, and was third in doubles.

With the Oaks that season, Abreu batted .148 with 1 double, and 1 triple in 19 games. In 1938, Abreu spent the entire season with the Oaks. He batted .299 with 28 doubles, 4 triples, and 11 home runs in 167 games. He led the Oaks in home runs, and was second in doubles that season.

The next season, 1939, he again spent the entire season with the Oaks batting .288 with 14 doubles, 9 triples, and 4 home runs in 140 games. Abreu played for the Class-A-1 Fort Worth Cats of the Texas League in 1940. He batted .250 with 27 doubles, 6 triples, and 10 home runs in 158 games. Abreu began the 1941 season with the Fort Worth Cats and batted .235 with 3 triples in 13 games. He spent the second half of the 1941 season with the Milwaukee Brewers in the Chicago Cubs organization. He batted .284 with 12 doubles, 2 triples, and 11 home runs in 100 games.

=== Cincinnati Reds ===
Abreu was participating in spring training with the Brewers in 1942 when he learned by telegram that he had been sold to the Los Angeles Angels, and a week later was sold to the Birmingham Barons, who sent him to their parent club, the Cincinnati Reds. He made his major league debut on April 23, 1942, against the Pittsburgh Pirates. His next game, he hit his first home run off of Lefty Wilkie. In 9 games with the Reds, Abreu batted .214 with 1 double, 1 home run, and 3 RBIs.

=== Return to the Yankees ===
On July 16, 1942, the Reds traded Abreu along with Jim Turner to the New York Yankees with Frankie Kelleher. He was assigned to the Class-AA Newark Bears and that season Abreu batted .236 with 4 doubles, and 1 triple in 30 games.

==== World War II ====
Abreu began his service with the United States Navy in 1943. During his service in World War II, Abreu was stationed at Livermore Naval Air Station in California. In service, Abreu continued to play baseball in the Army and Navy League where he was selected as an All-Star. He also played with the Golden Glows of the Alameda Summer and Winter leagues. Abreu was coached under then-Reds' catcher Ray Lamanno on the Livermore Naval Air Station baseball team, and he played with major leaguers Bill Rigney, Cookie Lavagetto, and Ray Scarborough.

=== Later career ===
Abreu returned to professional baseball after the war. He was assigned to the Class-D Wellsville Yankees where he began his career as a player-manager in 1946. He batted .352 with 24 doubles, 1 triple, and 21 home runs in 106 games. Abreu was tied for first in the Pennsylvania–Ontario–New York League in home runs that season. After the season, Abreu was given an unconditional release. The next season, 1947, Abreu split the season between the Class-D Newnan Brownies of the Georgia–Alabama League, and the Class-D Dayton Indians of the Ohio State League. With the Brownies, Abreu both managed them and batted and played for them. He batted .290 with 28 doubles, 2 triples, and 8 home runs in 104 games with Newnan. During his tenure with Dayton, Abreu batted .228 with 3 doubles, 1 triple, and 1 home run in 25 games. In his final professional season in which he played, Abreu played and managed the Class-C Tampa Smokers of the Florida International League. With Tampa, he batted .265 with 7 doubles, and 1 home run in 25 games.

== Later life ==
After his professional playing career was over, Abreu managed one other team in professional baseball before exiting the pro-level. He was one of four managers of the Class-D Santa Rosa Cats in 1949. Abreu asked to be released from Tampa to tend to issues back home in Oakland, California. He then returned to his native California to play for the semi-professional Guy's Drugs of Oakland who won the Bush Rod Winter League (the first league to use the designated hitter rule) pennant. During the mid-1950s, Abreu played softball with the Naval Supply Center team, and was involved in local baseball clinics in the area.

== Personal ==
Abreu married Berenice Marshall on January 4, 1939. Abreu was an enthusiast of magic, and was an amateur magician. His interest was sparked after former Detroit Tigers and Oakland Oaks' pitcher and professional magician Carl Zamloch put on a magic show at his high school. During his tenure with the Reds, Abreu claimed to know 400 card tricks and was a member of the National Society of Magicians. Abreu died on March 17, 1993, in Hayward, California at the age of 79 years, and was buried at Evergreen-Washelli Cemetery in Seattle, Washington.
