= Ken Guettler =

American baseball player

Kenneth Adam Guettler (May 29, 1927 – December 25, 1977) was an American minor league baseball player once called "The minors' Babe Ruth" who hit over 330 home runs and was a star at that level. He is most well known for his 1956 campaign, when he hit 62 home runs for the Shreveport Sports. He won seven home run and five RBI titles.

Guettler began his career in 1945 with the Kingsport Cherokees, leading the league with 13 home runs. In 1946, he played for the New Bern Bears, Burlington Bees and Charleston Rebels. In 1947, he hit .334 with 25 home runs and 103 RBI for the Griffin Pimientos, pacing the league in home runs and RBI. With the Montgomery Rebels and Gadsden Pilots in 1948, he led the league with 24 home runs. He played for the Des Moines Bruins in 1949. He hit 20 or more home runs for the third time in his career in 1950, hitting 22 between the Portsmouth Cubs and Des Moines.

With Portsmouth in 1951, he led the Piedmont League in homers (28), runs (114) and RBI (116). Between Portsmouth and the Toledo Mud Hens/Charleston Senators in 1952, he hit at least 28 home runs while batting .330. He led the Piedmont League again in home runs and RBI (104), as well as batting average (.334). In With Portsmouth again in 1953 and 1954, he hit 30 and 19 home runs, respectively. He was 1953 league home run champion. 1955 presaged his more well-known 1956 campaign. Back with Portsmouth, he posted a slash line of .325/.447/.632 with 41 home runs, 113 RBI and 97 runs scored. He led the league in home runs and RBI.

Moving to the Shreveport Sports for 1956, Guettler batted .293/.402/.726 with 62 home runs, 143 RBI and 115 runs scored in just 481 at-bats, leading the league in homers, RBI and runs scored. He broke Clarence Kraft's Texas League home run record of 55 and still holds the record. He was a mid-season and post-season All-Star, won the Most Valuable Player over Albie Pearson and Rookie of the Year over Brooks Robinson and Don Demeter,

He slumped after that and spent the rest of his career playing for the Atlanta Crackers (1957), Wichita Braves (1957), Dallas Rangers (1958), Monterrey Sultanes (1958), Nuevo Loredo Tecolotes (1958), Charlotte Hornets (1959) and Charleston ChaSox (1959).

He died in Jacksonville, Florida. In 2004, he was elected to the Texas League Hall of Fame.
