= Huntsville Springers =

- 1930–1930; Huntsville, Alabama

Minor league affiliations
- Previous classes: Class D
- League: Georgia–Alabama League

The Huntsville Springers were a Minor League Baseball team based in Huntsville, Alabama, that played in the Georgia–Alabama League in 1930.
