= Harold Knight (American football) =

American baseball player and football coach (1932–2016)

Biographical details
- Born: May 13, 1932
- Died: July 13, 2016 (aged 84); Hattiesburg, Mississippi, U.S.

Playing career

Baseball
- 1951: Amsterdam Rugmakers
- 1951: La Grange Troupers
- 1952: Meridian Millers
- 1953–1954: Alexandria Aces
- Position: Pitcher (baseball)

Coaching career (HC unless noted)

Football
- 1958: Louisiana College (assistant)
- 1959–1961: Louisiana College

Administrative career (AD unless noted)
- 1959–1963: Louisiana College

Head coaching record
- Overall: 27–13–1

Harold Victor Knight (May 13, 1932 – July 13, 2016) was an American minor league baseball player and college football coach. He served as the head football coach at Louisiana College from 1959 to 1961.
