= Tri-Cities Triplets (Georgia–Alabama League) =

Minor league baseball team from 1917

- (1917); Alabama

Minor league affiliations
- Previous classes: Class D
- League: Georgia–Alabama League

The Tri-Cities Triplets were a Minor League Baseball team that represented the cities of Alabama City, Attalla and Gadsden from Alabama. They played in the Class-D Georgia–Alabama League in 1917.

The team was moderately successful on the field, winning 10 of their 18 games. However, the league itself folded on May 23, 1917. The Triplets were in third place out of six teams when the league ceased operation.

Tom Long is the only player from the 1917 team to play in the major leagues; he pitched two innings with the Brooklyn Robins (Dodgers) in 1924.
