= Gadsden Eagles =

- 1928–1929; Gadsden, Alabama

Minor league affiliations
- Previous classes: Class D
- League: Georgia–Alabama League

The Gadsden Eagles were a Minor League Baseball team based in Gadsden, Alabama, that played in the Georgia–Alabama League from 1928–1929.

== See also ==
- Gadsden Pilots
- Gadsden Steel Makers
