= Don Flynn =

American gridiron football player (1934–2010)

No. 18, 15
- Positions: Cornerback, safety, linebacker, quarterback

Personal information
- Born: September 14, 1934; Durant, Oklahoma, U.S.
- Died: April 14, 2010 (aged 75); Tulsa, Oklahoma, U.S.
- Listed height: 6 ft 0 in (1.83 m)
- Listed weight: 205 lb (93 kg)

Career information
- High school: John Tyler (Tyler, Texas)
- College: Houston

Career history
- Edmonton Eskimos (1959); Dallas Texans (1960−1961); New York Titans (1961−1962)
- Stats at Pro Football Reference

Donald Max Flynn (September 14, 1934 – April 14, 2010) was an American professional gridiron football player. He played defensive back for the Edmonton Eskimos of the Canadian Football League (CFL) and the Dallas Texans and New York Titans of the American Football League (AFL). Flynn played college football at Houston.

== Early life ==
Flynn was born in Durant, Oklahoma and grew up in Tyler, Texas, where he attended and played high school football at John Tyler High School.

== Football career ==
Flynn played quarterback at Houston while studying petroleum engineering. He was an honorable mention to the 1957 All-America team. He started his professional career in the Canadian Football League with the Edmonton Eskimos before joining the American Football League's Dallas Texans in 1960 as a cornerback and safety. He began the 1961 season with the Texans, but began playing for the New York Titans midway through the season, where he played linebacker.

== Personal life ==
Flynn met his wife while she was working as a flight attendant on a flight he was taking with one of his football teams. They had four children together.

Flynn worked in the petroleum industry, starting an oil company, after retiring from football. He also coached his youngest son's high school football teams.

On April 14, 2010, Flynn died in Tulsa, Oklahoma.
