= Paul Fittery =

American baseball player (1887–1974)

- Pitcher
- Born: October 10, 1887; Lebanon, Pennsylvania, U.S.
- Died: January 28, 1974 (aged 86); Cartersville, Georgia, U.S.
- Batted: Both Threw: Left

MLB debut
- September 5, 1914, for the Cincinnati Reds

Last MLB appearance
- October 3, 1917, for the Philadelphia Phillies

MLB statistics
- Win–loss record: 1–3
- Earned run average: 3.90
- Strikeouts: 34
- Stats at Baseball Reference

Teams
- Cincinnati Reds (1914); Philadelphia Phillies (1917)

Paul Clarence Fittery (October 2, 1887 – January 28, 1974) was an American Major League Baseball pitcher. Fittery played for the Cincinnati Reds in 1914 and Philadelphia Phillies in 1917. Fittery first broke into the major leagues when he was 26 years old on September 5, 1914 with the Cincinnati Reds. His final game was on October 3, 1917. In total, he won 294 minor league games that took place between 1910 and 1930, as compared with 228 losses. His ERA was 3.04 in 4,528 innings in 663 games.
