= Lindale, Georgia minor league baseball history =

Lindale Georgia minor league baseball teams
- 1917–1930; (1917, 1920–1921, 1928–1930); Lindale, Georgia

Minor league affiliations
- Class: Class D (1917, 1920–1921, 1928–1930)
- League: Georgia-Alabama League (1917); Georgia State League (1920–1921); Georgia-Alabama League (1928–1930)

Major league affiliations
- Team: None

Minor league titles
- League titles (0): None
- Conference titles (3): 1921; 1929; 1930

Team data
- Name: Rome-Lindale Romans (1917); Lindale Pepperells (1920–1921); Lindale Dragons (1928); Lindale Collegians (1929); Lindale Pepperells (1930)
- Ballpark: Rome Ball Park (1917); Unknown (1920–1921, 1928–1930)

Minor league baseball teams were based in Lindale, Georgia in various seasons between 1917 and 1930. Lindale teams played as members of the Class D level Georgia-Alabama League in 1917, Georgia State League from 1920 to 1921 and Georgia-Alabama League from 1928 to 1930, winning three league pennants.

== History ==
Minor league baseball began in Lindale, Georgia in 1917. The Rome-Lindale Romans were formed, with Lindale sharing the team in partnership with nearby Rome, Georgia. The 1917 Rome-Lindale Romans played in the six–team Class D level Georgia-Alabama League after the Rome Romans played independently in the 1916 league. On May 23, 1917, the Georgia-Alabama League folded. The Rome-Lindale team finished with a record of 9–9 to place fourth in the final standings. Playing under manager Daniel Overton, the Romans finished 4.0 games behind the first place Anniston Moulders in the final standings. The Georgia-Alabama League did not return to play in the 1918 season.

The 1920 Lindale Pepperells resumed minor league play, as the team became members of the six–team Class D level Georgia State League. Lindale finished the 1920 season with a record of 47–43. The Pepperells placed third under manager Hardin Herndon, finishing 5.0 games behind the first place Carrollton team in the final standings.

The Lindale use of the "Pepperells" moniker corresponds to the local industry in the era. The Lindale Textile Mill was owned by the West Point-Pepperell for the majority of its existence, with the Lindale community commonly referred to as "Pepperell." Today, Pepperell High School uses the West Point-Pepperell (currently WestPoint Home) Griffin as the mascot, with athletic teams playing under the moniker "Pepperell Dragons".

The Lindale Pepperells continued play in the 1921 six–team Georgia State League and won the league pennant. Lindale finished with a record of 69–29, placing first in the 1921 standings. Playing under returning manager Hardin Herndon, Lindale finished 17.5 games ahead of the second place Griffin, Georgia team in the regular season standings. In the league playoff, the LaGrange team defeated the Pepperells 4 games to 1 to win the championship. The Georgia State League permanently folded after the 1921 season, leaving Lindale unable to defend their championship.

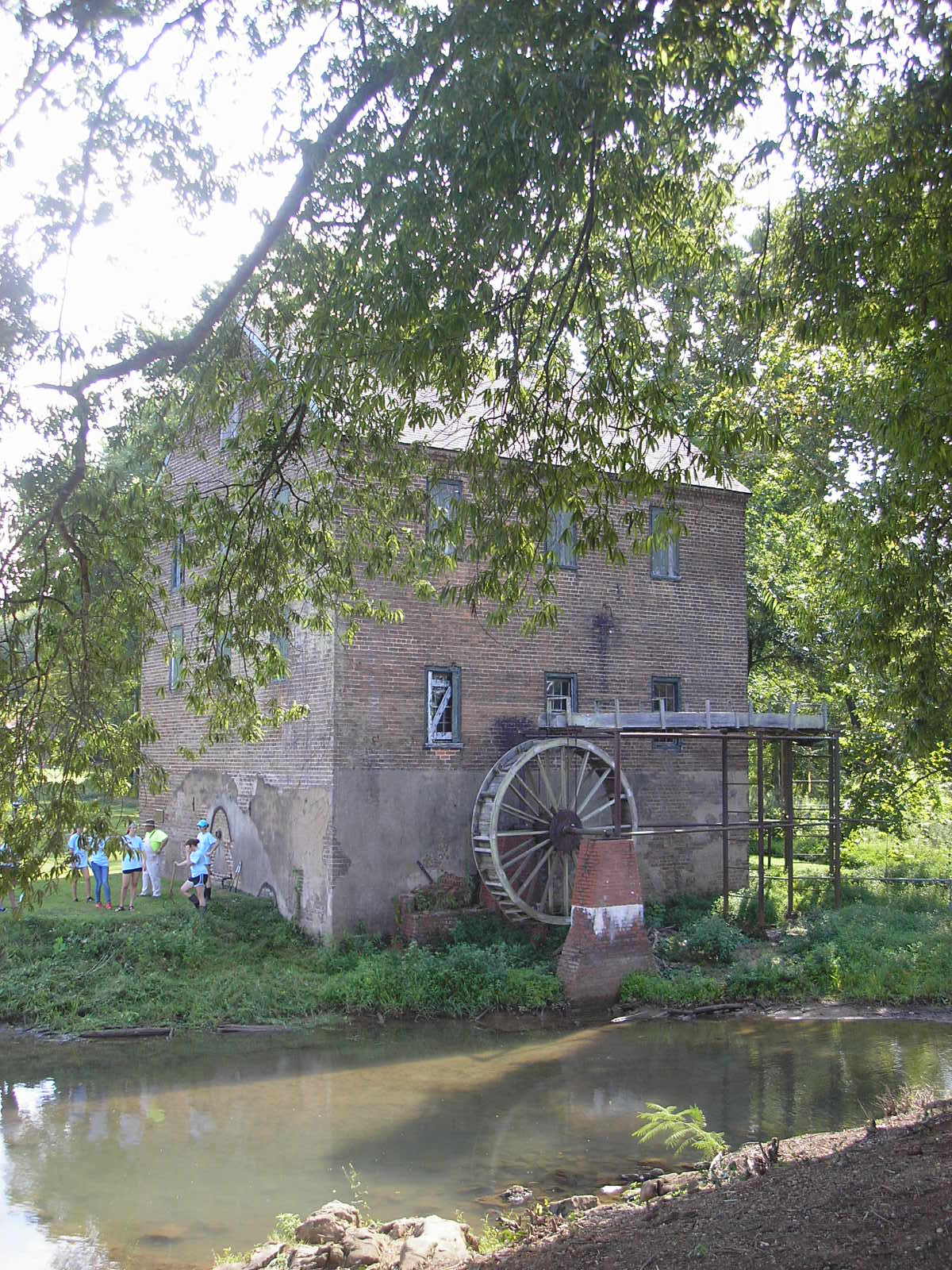
(2016) Lindale Grist Mill. National Register of Historic Places. Lindale, Georgia

In 1928, the Lindale Dragons resumed minor league play and finished last. Lindale resumed play as members of the reformed Class D level Georgia-Alabama League. Finishing the season in sixth place in the six–team league, the Dragons had a 26–62 record playing under manager Earl Donaldson. The Dragons finished 28.5 games behind first place Cedartown Sea Cows in the overall regular season standings.

The 1929 Lindale Collegians rebounded from the last place finish and won the 1929 Georgia-Alabama League pennant. The Collegians finished in first place in the regular season, with a 60–35 record under manager Jack Moulton, finishing 0.5 games ahead of the second place Carrollton Champs in the six–team league regular season standings. In the playoff, Carrollton swept Lindale in four games and won the championship.

In their final season of minor league play, the 1930 Lindale Pepperells won their second consecutive Georgia-Alabama League pennant. With a 63–38 record, Lindale finished 3.0 games ahead of the Cedartown Braves, playing under returning manager Jack Moulton. In the playoff, Cedartown defeated Lindale 4 games to 3 to claim the championship. The Georgia-Alabama League folded after the 1930 season. Bernard Lewis of Lindale led the Georgia-Alabama League with 175 total hits and a batting average of .422, while teammate Abe White led the league with 139 strikeouts.

Lindale, Georgia has not hosted another minor league baseball team.

The popularity of baseball in the area continued as local semi–professional teams flourished from 1931 to 1954 playing in the Northwest Georgia Textile League. The Lindale team began play in 1931 and played 20 seasons in the league, winning four championships and one pennant.

== The ballpark ==
In 1917, the Rome-Lindale Romans team were noted to have played minor league home games at the Rome Ball Park, called Hamilton Park in neighboring Rome, Georgia. The site is home to Barron Stadium today.

The name of the Lindale minor league teams' home ballpark in Lindale is not directly referenced. It was noted the facilities of the namesake Pepperell High School were in use in the era. The high school is still in use as a public high school. It is located at 3 Dragon Drive in Lindale, Georgia.

== Timeline ==
Year(s)	# Yrs.	Team	Level	League
1917	1	Rome-Lindale Romans	Class D	Georgia-Alabama League
1920–1921	2	Lindale Pepperells	Class D	Georgia State League
1928	1	Lindale Dragons	Class D	Georgia-Alabama League
1929	1	Lindale Collegians	Class D	Georgia-Alabama League
1930	1	Lindale Pepperells	Class D	Georgia-Alabama League

== Year–by–year records ==
Year	Record	Finish	Manager	Playoffs/Notes
1917	9–9	4th	Daniel Overton	League folded May 23
1920	47–43	3rd	Hardin Herndon	No playoffs held
1921	69–29	1st	Hardin Herndon	Won league pennant Lost in finals
1928	26–62	6th	Earl Donaldson	Did not qualify
1929	60–35	1st	Jack Moulton	Won league pennant Lost in finals
1930	63–38	1st	Jack Moulton	Won league pennant Lost in finals

== Notable alumni ==
- Doc Land (1930)
- Abe White (1930)
- Lindale Pepperells players
