= Gadsden Pilots =

- 1938–1950; (1938–1941, 1946–1950); Gadsden, Alabama

Minor league affiliations
- Previous classes: Class B
- League: Southeastern League

Major league affiliations
- Previous teams: Washington Senators (1948); Pittsburgh Pirates (1939–1940)

Team data
- Previous names: Gadsden Pilots (1950); Gadsden Chiefs (1949); Gadsden Pilots (1938–1941, 1946–1948)
- Previous parks: Coosa Park

The Gadsden Pilots were a Minor League Baseball team based in Gadsden, Alabama, that played in the Southeastern League from 1938 to 1950 (no team was fielded from 1942 to 1945 because of World War II).

== See also ==
- Gadsden Eagles
- Gadsden Steel Makers
