= War Sanders =

American baseball player (1877–1962)

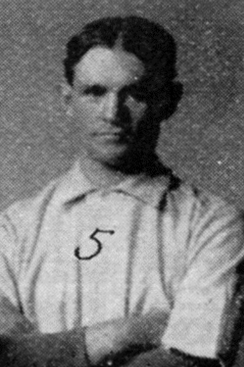
- Sanders with the Nashville Baseball Club in 1902
- Pitcher
- Born: August 2, 1877; Maynardville, Tennessee, U.S.
- Died: August 3, 1962 (aged 85); Chattanooga, Tennessee, U.S.
- Batted: Right Threw: Left

MLB debut
- April 18, 1903, for the St. Louis Cardinals

Last MLB appearance
- July 4, 1904, for the St. Louis Cardinals

MLB statistics
- Win–loss record: 2–8
- Earned run average: 5.64
- Strikeouts: 20
- Stats at Baseball Reference

Teams
- St. Louis Cardinals (1903–1904)

Warren Williams Sanders (August 2, 1877 – August 3, 1962) was an American professional baseball player who played pitcher in the Major Leagues in 1903 and 1904 for the St. Louis Cardinals. He went to college at the University of Tennessee.
