= Jack Nabors =

American baseball player (1887–1923)

- Pitcher
- Born: November 19, 1887; Montevallo, Alabama, U.S.
- Died: October 29, 1923 (aged 35); Wilton, Alabama, U.S.
- Batted: Right Threw: Left

MLB debut
- August 9, 1915, for the Philadelphia Athletics

Last MLB appearance
- April 16, 1917, for the Philadelphia Athletics

MLB statistics
- Earned run average: 3.87
- Record: 1-25
- Strikeouts: 94
- Stats at Baseball Reference

Teams
- Philadelphia Athletics (1915–1917)

Herman John Nabors (November 19, 1887 – October 29, 1923) was an American professional baseball pitcher who played for the Philadelphia Athletics in Major League Baseball from 1915 to 1917. From April 28 to September 28, 1916, Nabors lost 19 consecutive decisions, a major league record that has never been matched in a single season, though Cliff Curtis, several years previously, lost 23 straight decisions over 2 years, and Anthony Young once lost 27 straight decisions over the course of two seasons.
