= Jake Daniel =

American baseball player (1911-1996)

- First baseman
- Born: April 22, 1911; Roanoke, Alabama, U.S.
- Died: April 23, 1996 (aged 85); LaGrange, Georgia, U.S.
- Batted: Left Threw: Left

MLB debut
- July 24, 1937, for the Brooklyn Dodgers

Last MLB appearance
- August 7, 1954, for the Brooklyn Dodgers

MLB statistics
- Batting average: .185
- Home runs: 0
- Runs batted in: 3
- Stats at Baseball Reference

Teams
- Brooklyn Dodgers (1937)

Handley Jacob Daniel (April 22, 1911 – April 23, 1996) was an American professional baseball player. He played in Major League Baseball for the 1937 Brooklyn Dodgers, primarily as a first baseman.
