= Anniston Nobles =

- 1904–1930; (1904, 1911–1917, 1928–1930); Anniston, Alabama

Minor league affiliations
- Previous classes: Class D
- League: Georgia–Alabama League (1913–1917, 1928–1930)
- Previous leagues: Southeastern League (1911–1912); Tennessee–Alabama League (1904)

Team data
- Previous names: Anniston Nobles (1928–1930); Anniston Moulders (1913–1917); Anniston Models (1911–1912); Anniston (1904)

The Anniston Nobles were a minor league baseball team based in Anniston, Alabama, United States, that operated in the Georgia–Alabama League from 1928 to 1930. Previously the Anniston Moulders had played in the league from 1913 to 1917.
