= Sam Gibson (baseball) =

American baseball player (1899–1983)

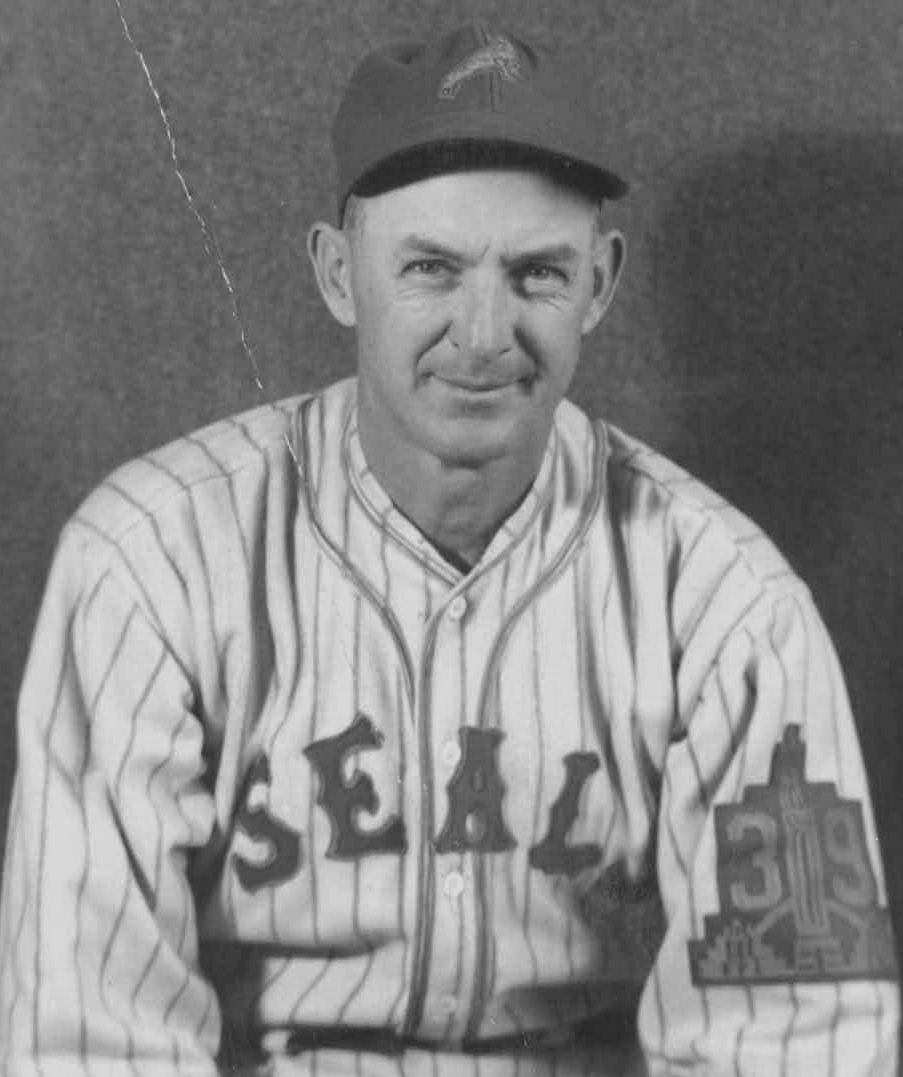
- Gibson in 1939
- Pitcher
- Born: August 5, 1899; King, North Carolina, U.S.
- Died: January 31, 1983 (aged 83); High Point, North Carolina, U.S.
- Batted: Left Threw: Right

MLB debut
- April 19, 1926, for the Detroit Tigers

Last MLB appearance
- September 18, 1932, for the New York Giants

MLB statistics
- Win–loss record: 32–38
- Earned run average: 4.28
- Strikeouts: 208
- Stats at Baseball Reference

Teams
- Detroit Tigers (1926–1928); New York Yankees (1930); New York Giants (1932)

Samuel Braxton Gibson (August 5, 1899 – January 31, 1983) was an American right-handed pitcher in Major League Baseball who played five seasons with the Detroit Tigers (1926–28), New York Yankees (1930) and New York Giants (1932).

Born in King, North Carolina, Gibson attended Catawba College before making his major league debut on April 19, 1926. He was a starting pitcher on manager Ty Cobb's Tigers, winning 12 games and throwing nearly 200 innings in his rookie season. In a game against the Philadelphia Athletics in 1928, he allowed the 4,000th hit of Cobb's career.

After playing smaller roles on the Yankees and Giants, Gibson played fourteen seasons in the minor-league Pacific Coast League for the San Francisco Seals, Portland Beavers and Oakland Oaks in 1931 and from 1933 to 1945. His best season was 1935, in which he went 22–4. He holds the Seals' highest single-season winning percentage at .846. He was a teammate of Joe DiMaggio, and the two were inducted into the Pacific Coast League Hall of Fame in 2003.

Gibson died in 1983 at age 83 in High Point, North Carolina.
