= Joseph Wiley =

American baseball player (1857–1924)

- Third Baseman
- Born: March 1857; Philadelphia, Pennsylvania
- Died: January 8, 1924 (aged 66); Philadelphia, Pennsylvania
- Batted: Unknown Threw: Unknown

MLB debut
- June 23, 1884, for the Washington Nationals (UA)

Last MLB appearance
- June 23, 1884, for the Washington Nationals (UA)

MLB statistics
- Batting average: .000
- Hits: 0
- RBIs: 0
- Stats at Baseball Reference

Teams
- Washington Nationals (1884)

Joseph Wiley (March 1857– January 8, 1924) was a Major League Baseball third baseman who played in one game on June 23, 1884 for the Washington Nationals of the Union Association.
