= Buck Etchison =

American baseball player (1915-1980)

- First baseman
- Born: January 27, 1915; Baltimore, Maryland, U.S.
- Died: January 24, 1980 (aged 64); East New Market, Maryland, U.S.
- Batted: Left Threw: Left

MLB debut
- September 22, 1943, for the Boston Braves

Last MLB appearance
- October 1, 1944, for the Boston Braves

MLB statistics
- At bats: 327
- RBI: 35
- Home runs: 8
- Batting average: .220
- Stats at Baseball Reference

Teams
- Boston Braves (1943–1944)

Clarence Hampton "Buck" Etchison (January 27, 1915 – January 24, 1980) was an American professional first baseman who played for the Boston Braves in parts of two seasons spanning 1943–1944.

At the end of the 1944 season, he was sent to the minor league Milwaukee Brewers of the American Association, as one of the players to be named later when the Braves received Dick Culler and Tommy Nelson in August 1944. Etchison would replace Heinz Becker in the Brewers lineup when the latter was promoted to the Chicago Cubs.

Etchison was born in Baltimore, Maryland, and died at the age of 64 in East New Market, Maryland of a heart attack.
