= Milt Watson =

American baseball player (1890–1962)

- Pitcher
- Born: January 10, 1890; Flovilla, Georgia, U.S.
- Died: April 10, 1962 (aged 72); Pine Bluff, Arkansas, U.S.
- Batted: Right Threw: Right

MLB debut
- July 26, 1916, for the St. Louis Cardinals

Last MLB appearance
- June 16, 1919, for the Philadelphia Phillies

MLB statistics
- Win–loss record: 21–30
- Earned run average: 3.57
- Strikeouts: 113
- Stats at Baseball Reference

Teams
- St. Louis Cardinals (1916–1917); Philadelphia Phillies (1918–1919)

Milton Robert Watson (January 10, 1890 – April 10, 1962), nicknamed "Mule", was an American Major League Baseball (MLB) pitcher who played from 1916 to 1919 with the St. Louis Cardinals and the Philadelphia Phillies. He batted and threw right-handed.

He was born in Flovilla, Georgia, and died in Pine Bluff, Arkansas.

== Transactions ==
Milton Watson was traded by the St. Louis Cardinals to the Philadelphia Phillies on April 4, 1918, for Bert Niehoff and $500.
