= Callaway Stadium =

Stadium in LaGrange, Georgia

Coordinates: 33°01′36″N 85°02′39″W

Callaway Stadium is a football/soccer stadium located in LaGrange, Georgia. It was built in 1958 by Callaway Foundation and is used by the Troup County High School, LaGrange High School, and Callaway High School football and soccer teams, as well as the LaGrange College Fighting Red Panthers football team. The facilities are also used by the football teams of the three public middle schools in Troup County as well. Despite its age, the stadium had FieldTurf installed in 2004 and a more advanced scoreboard installed in 2008. Its capacity is roughly 5,000 people all day long and has a press box on the home side.

On May 20, 2009, Callaway Stadium announced plans to renovate, including plans to add 1,200 new seats.

== GHSA football championship game results at Callaway Stadium ==
December 12, 1958 (Class AAA) LaGrange 26, Decatur 12

December 10, 1983 (Class AAAA) Tift County 59, LaGrange 6

December 4, 2004 (Class AAA) LaGrange 17, Washington County 6
