= Don Bessent =

American baseball player (1931–1990)

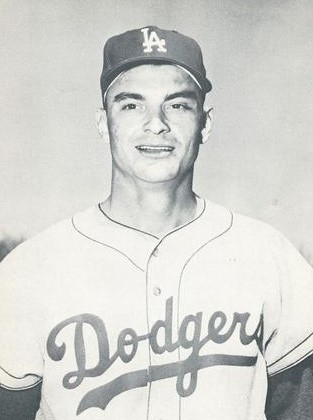
- Pitcher
- Born: March 13, 1931; Jacksonville, Florida, U.S.
- Died: July 7, 1990 (aged 59); Jacksonville, Florida, U.S.
- Batted: Right Threw: Right

MLB debut
- July 17, 1955, for the Brooklyn Dodgers

Last MLB appearance
- September 27, 1958, for the Los Angeles Dodgers

MLB statistics
- Win–loss record: 14–7
- Earned run average: 4.05
- Strikeouts: 118
- Stats at Baseball Reference

Teams
- Brooklyn / Los Angeles Dodgers (1955–1958)

Career highlights and awards
- World Series championship (1955)

Fred Donald Bessent (March 13, 1931 – July 7, 1990) was an American pitcher in Major League Baseball. He pitched from 1955 to 1958 with the Brooklyn/Los Angeles Dodgers.

He was signed by the New York Yankees out of high school, and in his first professional season he pitched a no-hitter while going 22–7 in Class D. The following season, he moved up to the Class B Norfolk Tars and went 11–2 with a 2.04 earned run average. Bessent then developed a spinal condition and was unable to pitch in 1952. He underwent surgery and was subsequently drafted by the Dodgers.

From 1953 to 1955, Bessent pitched for the St. Paul Saints of the American Association. He was called up to the majors in July 1955 and immediately pitched well. That season, he went 8–1 with a 2.70 ERA, mostly coming out of the bullpen. He also pitched 3 1/3 scoreless innings in the 1955 World Series, and the Dodgers won their first championship.

Bessent pitched just as well in 1956, going 4–3 with nine saves and a 2.50 ERA. The Dodgers won another National League pennant but lost the World Series to the New York Yankees, despite Bessent's win in Game 2. He pitched the final seven innings of a 13–8 slugfest after both teams' starting pitchers were knocked out in the second inning.

In 1957, he dropped off sharply, posting a 5.73 ERA in 44 innings. He began to develop arm problems shortly afterwards and played his final major league game in September 1958. He retired in 1962, after several unsuccessful seasons in the minors.

Bessent returned to Jacksonville and became a sales representative. He died of alcohol poisoning in 1990. He had three daughters, who remained in Jacksonville following his death.
