= Red Roberts =

American baseball player (1918-1998)

- Shortstop
- Born: August 8, 1918; Carrollton, Georgia, U.S.
- Died: December 2, 1998 (aged 80); Atlanta, Georgia, U.S.
- Batted: Right Threw: Right

MLB debut
- September 3, 1943, for the Washington Senators

Last MLB appearance
- October 3, 1943, for the Washington Senators

MLB statistics
- Batting average: .261
- Home runs: 1
- Runs batted in: 3
- Stats at Baseball Reference

Teams
- Washington Senators (1943)

This is an article about the baseball player. For the college football coach, see Red Roberts (American football).

Charles Emory "Red" Roberts (August 8, 1918 – December 2, 1998) was an American Major League Baseball player. Roberts played for the Washington Senators in 1943. He batted and threw right-handed.

He was born in Carrollton, Georgia and died in Atlanta.
