= Abe White =

American baseball player (1904–1978)

- Pitcher
- Born: May 16, 1904; Winder, Georgia, U.S.
- Died: October 1, 1978 (aged 74); Atlanta, Georgia, U.S.
- Batted: Right Threw: Left

MLB debut
- July 5, 1937, for the St. Louis Cardinals

Last MLB appearance
- July 18, 1937, for the St. Louis Cardinals

MLB statistics
- Win–loss record: 0–1
- Earned run average: 6.75
- Strikeouts: 2
- Stats at Baseball Reference

Teams
- St. Louis Cardinals (1937)

Adel "Abe" White (May 16, 1904 – October 1, 1978) was an American professional baseball player. He was a left-handed pitcher for one season (1937) with the St. Louis Cardinals. For his career, he compiled an 0–1 record, with a 6.75 earned run average, and 2 strikeouts in 9 1/3 innings pitched. A single in his only at-bat left White with a rare MLB career batting average of 1.000.

White's only decision came on July 18 when the Cardinals fell to the Brooklyn Dodgers, 6–5, at the Polo Grounds.

White was born in Winder, Georgia, and died in Atlanta, Georgia at the age of 74.
