= Gadsden Steel Makers =

- 1910–1914; Gadsden, Alabama

Minor league affiliations
- Previous classes: Class D
- League: Georgia–Alabama League (1913–1914)
- Previous leagues: Southeastern League (1910–1912)

The Gadsden Steel Makers were a Minor League Baseball team based in Gadsden, Alabama, that played in the Southeastern League and Georgia–Alabama League from 1910 to 1914.

== See also ==
- Gadsden Eagles
- Gadsden Pilots
