= Tallassee Indians =

- 1939–1949; (1939–1941, 1946–1949); Tallassee, Alabama

Minor league affiliations
- Previous classes: Class D
- League: Georgia–Alabama League (1946–1949)
- Previous leagues: Alabama State League (1940–1941); Alabama–Florida League (1939)

Major league affiliations
- Previous teams: St. Louis Cardinals (1948–1949); Pittsburgh Pirates (1946); Detroit Tigers (1941)

Minor league titles
- League titles: 1939, 1946

Team data
- Previous names: Tallassee Cardinals (1949); Tallassee Indians (1939–1941, 1946–1948)

The Tallassee Indians were a Minor League Baseball team that represented Tallassee, Alabama in the Georgia–Alabama League from 1939 to 1949.
