= Alexander City Millers =

- 1947–1951; Alexander City, Alabama

Minor league affiliations
- Class: Class D (1947–1951)
- League: Georgia–Alabama League (1947–1951)

Minor league titles
- League titles (1): 1949

Team data
- Name: Alexander City Millers (1947–1951)
- Ballpark: Benjamin C. Russell Field (1947–1951)

The Alexander City Millers were an American minor league baseball team in Alexander City, AL between 1947 and 1951. They played in the Georgia–Alabama League in the Benjamin C. Russell Field.

== Year-by-year record ==
Year	Record	Finish	Manager	Playoffs	Notes
1947	39-86	8th	Doug Taitt		
1948	63-63	4th	Ben Catchings / Marvin Chappell / Luther Gunnells	Lost in 1st round	
1949	69-57	2nd	Red Roberts	League Champs	
1950	73-53	2nd	Red Roberts	Lost League Finals	
1951	33-45	--	Sam Demma / William Brown	--	Team disbanded July 15
