= Valley Rebels =

- 1946–1951; Alabama

Minor league affiliations
- Previous classes: Class D
- League: Georgia–Alabama League

Major league affiliations
- Previous teams: Boston Red Sox (1948–1949)

Minor league titles
- League titles: 2 (1947, 1948)

Team data
- Previous parks: Jennings Field

The Valley Raiders were a Minor League Baseball team that represented Valley, Alabama, Lanett, Alabama and West Point, Georgia. They played in the Georgia–Alabama League from 1946 to 1951 and were affiliated with the Boston Red Sox in 1948–1949.
