= Talladega Indians =

- 1911–1930; (1911–1917, 1928–1930); Talladega, Alabama

Minor league affiliations
- Previous classes: Class D
- League: Georgia–Alabama League (1913–1917, 1928–1930)
- Previous leagues: Southeastern League (1911–1912)

Team data
- Previous names: Talladega Indians (1928–1930); Talladega Tigers (1915–1917); Talladega Indians (1913–1914); Talladega Highlanders (1912); Huntsville Mountaineers (1912); Huntsville Westerns (1911)

The Talladega Indians (also known as the Tigers and Highlanders) were a Minor League Baseball team based in Talladega, Alabama, that played in the Georgia–Alabama League from 1913 to 1917 and 1928–1930. The team originated in Huntsville, Alabama where they were known as the Westerns and Mountaineers before moving midway through the 1912 season.
