= Carrollton Hornets =

- 1946–1950; Carrollton, Georgia

Minor league affiliations
- Class: Class D
- League: Georgia–Alabama League

Team data
- Ballpark: City Athletic Field
- Owner(s)/ Operator(s): Carrollton Baseball Club, Inc.

The Carrollton Hornets were a minor league baseball team that represented Carrollton, Georgia in the Georgia–Alabama League from 1946 to 1950.
