= Opelika Owls =

- 1913–1951; (1913–1914, 1946–1951); Opelika, Alabama

Minor league affiliations
- Previous classes: Class D
- League: Georgia–Alabama League

Team data
- Previous names: Opelika Owls (1946–1951); Opelika Pelicans (1914); Opelika Opelicans (1913)

The Opelika Owls were a Minor League Baseball team that represented Opelika, Alabama in the Georgia–Alabama League from 1946 to 1951.
