= Tommy Parks =

American football player (born 1968)

No. 17
- Position: Punter

Personal information
- Born: October 14, 1968 (age 58); Okolona, Mississippi, U.S.
- Listed height: 6 ft 2 in (1.88 m)
- Listed weight: 225 lb (102 kg)

Career information
- High school: Houston (Houston, Mississippi)
- College: Mississippi State (1986–1990)
- NFL draft: 1991: undrafted

Career history
- San Francisco 49ers (2000)*; New York Jets (2001)
- * Offseason or practice squad member only
- Stats at Pro Football Reference

Thomas E. Parks II (born October 14, 1968) is an American former professional football player who was a punter for the New York Jets of the National Football League (NFL). He played college football for the Mississippi State Bulldogs. He also played baseball in independent leagues as a pitcher. Parks received attention in 2001 for lying about his age.

== Early life ==
Thomas E. Parks II was born on October 14, 1968, in Okolona, Mississippi, United States. He played high school football at Houston High School in Houston, Mississippi. He was planning to attend the University of Mississippi as a quarterback but suffered an injury during his senior year of high school.

== College career ==
Parks enrolled at Mississippi State University to play college football for the Mississippi State Bulldogs as a punter. He was a four-year letterman from 1986 to 1989. He punted 38 times for 1,513 yards in 1986, 55 times for 2,149 yards in 1987, and 29 times for 1,162 yards in 1988. Parks was named to the SEC All-Freshman team in 1986. He was listed as the backup to Mike Riley in 1989 and did not play any due to injury. In 1990, he was listed on Mississippi State's roster as a backup tight end.

Parks also played three seasons of college baseball for the Bulldogs as a pitcher but never earned a varsity letter. He only pitched 3.5 innings total and accumulated a 13.64 earned run average (ERA).

== Professional career ==
After college, Parks worked as a waiter, as a stocker at Wal-Mart, and at a fast-food restaurant. In 1994, he started playing minor league football in Taiwan with the Taipei Dragons of the United Football League. He played punter, quarterback, and tight end while with the Dragons.

Parks played independent league baseball as a pitcher for the Mobile BaySharks of the Texas-Louisiana League in 1995, the Pine Bluff Locomotives of the Big South League in 1996, the Alexandria Aces of the Texas-Louisiana League in 1997, the Meridian Brakemen of the Big South League in 1997, Tupelo of the Big South League in 1997, and the Greenville Bluesmen of the Texas-Louisiana League in 1998. He practiced punting after baseball games.

In 1999, Parks had a tryout with the Arizona Cardinals of the National Football League (NFL) but was not signed. He signed with the NFL's San Francisco 49ers on April 24, 2000. He was released by the 49ers on August 15, 2000. He also had a tryout with the Kansas City Chiefs at one point but was not signed.

Parks was signed by the New York Jets on April 21, 2001. He was known for his Elvis-like personality while with the Jets. Parks claimed to be from Tupelo, Mississippi, the birthplace of Elvis. He talked like Elvis, had Elvis sideburns, and sang Elvis songs. In late August 2001, Parks received criticism from the media for lying about his baseball career and age. Parks previously claimed he had played AAA baseball and had been born in 1971. Mississippi state records also showed that he was born in Okolona, Mississippi, not Tupelo. Due to an injury to Tom Tupa, Parks punted for the Jets during the regular season opener on September 9, 2001, against the Indianapolis Colts. He punted five times for 238 yards (47.6 average) while also having one punt returned for a touchdown in the 45–24 loss. Parks was the oldest NFL rookie punter since Zenon Andrusyshyn in 1978. Jets special teams coach Mike Westhoff was displeased with the return touchdown, stating "We practice punting that way all the time. Hit the number area so we can cut the field down. He punted straight down the middle of the field. It wasn't what we wanted, that's for sure." Parks said "That one play I broke our back. They should get rid of me. I didn't have the ball over where the guys were at." He was released on September 17, 2001, after Tupa returned from injury.

After New York Giants punter Rodney Williams broke his wrist trying to make a tackle, Parks was one of several punters the Giants tried out on November 6, 2001. He never re-signed.

Parks played baseball for the Newark Bears of the Atlantic League of Professional Baseball from 2003 to 2004. He finished his baseball career with totals of 91 games pitched, 22 games started, and a 5.70 ERA.

== Personal life ==
Parks's parents abandoned him shortly after birth and he was raised by his grandmother. In 2001, Parks told reporters that he was an "orphan", and that, in July, he had been adopted by a 52-year-old woman in Reno, Nevada, named Maryann Diaz, for whom he used to work as a security guard. He became a fitness trainer after his football career.
