= Alexandre Stassievitch =

French footballer (born 1950)

Personal information
- Full name: Alexandre Stassievitch
- Date of birth: 20 September 1950 (age 76)
- Place of birth: Libercourt, France
- Height: 1.74 m (5 ft 8 1/2 in)
- Position: Defender

Youth career
- –1972: Ostricourt
- 1972–1974: Lens

Senior career*
Years	Team	Apps	(Gls)
1974–1977	Lens	57	(1)
1977–1978	Poissy	33	(2)
1978–1980	Montluçon	63	(7)
1980–1982	Nœux-les-Mines	59	(2)
1982–1987	Saint-Omer		

International career
1976	France Olympic	4	(0)
- * Club domestic league appearances and goals

Alexandre Stassievitch (born 20 September 1950) is a French former professional footballer who played as a defender. He played club football for Lens, Poissy, Montluçon, Nœux-les-Mines, and Saint-Omer, and represented France at the 1976 Summer Olympics.

== Club career ==
Born in Libercourt, Stassievitch began playing football as a center forward for local side Ostricourt. In 1972, he signed for RC Lens and began playing as a defender for the second team. He made his Ligue 1 debut for Lens in 1974, making several more appearances during his time with the club. He was on the bench as Lens lost the Coupe de France 1974-75 final.

Stassievitch spent the following seasons in Ligue 2, one with AS Poissy and two with ÉDS Montluçon. In 1980, Gérard Houllier recruited him for US Nœux-les-Mines. In his two seasons with the club, they entered the promotion playoffs and reached the 1/16-finals of the Coupe de France.

He would spend the next five years playing amateur football for US Saint-Omer before retiring in 1987.

== International career ==
Stassievitch captained France at the 1976 Summer Olympics in Montreal, where the team reached the quarterfinals.
