= Simon Flak =

French footballer and manager (1923–1999)

Personal information
- Date of birth: 1923
- Place of birth: France
- Date of death: February 1999 (aged 75–76)
- Place of death: France
- Position: Defender

Senior career*
Years	Team	Apps	(Gls)
1945–46	Lens		
- Cannes
- Monaco
- Toulon

Managerial career
- 1955–1976: Nœux-les-Mines
- * Club domestic league appearances and goals

Simon Flak (1923 – February 1999) was a Franco-Polish footballer who played as a defender for Lens and Cannes in the late 1940s. He later became a coach, leading Nœux-les-Mines for 21 years, from 1955 until 1976.

== Career ==
Born in 1923, Flak played for the likes of Lens (1945–46), Cannes, Monaco, and Toulon. In 1955, Flak was appointed as the coach of Nœux-les-Mines, a position that he held for 21 years, until 1976, when he was replaced by Guy Debeugny, who needed to surround himself with people, so he suggested Gérard Houllier, who went on to replace him in 1978. Under his leadership, the USN was relegated to the 1st division Artois in 1961, but only stayed there for one season before returning to the PH championship, achieving promotion to the DH in 1969, which they won in 1971, thus reaching the third division. In his last season at the club, in 1976, he led Nœux-les-Mines to a triumph in the third division, thus reaching the second division and adopting semi-professional status.

During his time at Nœux-les-Mines, Flak coached several notable players, such as Jean-Louis Delecroix.

== Death ==
Flak died in February 1999, at the age of either 75 or 76. His son Hervé Flak followed in his footsteps, as he also played for Lens (1975–84), being one of the club's most capped players with over 310 matches.

== Honours ==
Nœux-les-Mines

- Third Division
  - Champions (1): 1976

== See also ==
- List of longest managerial reigns in association football
