= Greenville Bluesmen =

Information
- Location: Greenville, Mississippi
- Founded: 1996
- Disbanded: 2001
- League championships: 1996, 1997
- Former name: Bluesmen
- Former league: Texas–Louisiana League
- Former ballpark: Legion Field
- Colors: Light navy, emerald green, gold, white
- Ownership: Harlan Bruha
- General manager: Bill Hood
- Manager: Robin Hariss

The Greenville Bluesmen were a minor league baseball team that played in Greenville, Mississippi. The team was a member of the independent Big South League from 1996–1997 and the independent Texas–Louisiana League from 1998–2001. The team played at Legion Field in Greenville.

== Seasons ==
The following is a list of all-time Bluesmen regular season results in both the Big South League (1996–1997) and Texas–Louisiana League (1998–2001). Greenville had a cumulative record of 202-303 (.400) over six seasons.

Season	W	L	Pct.	GB	Finish
1996	16	19	.457	6.0	4th (1st half)
1996	19	17	.528	2.0	2nd (2nd half)
1997	19	14	.576	3.0	3rd (1st half)
1997	20	6	.769	-	1st (2nd half)
1998	14	28	.333	18.0	7th (1st half)
1998	8	34	.190	24.0	7th (2nd half)
1999	26	58	.310	37.0	7th
2000	46	66	.411	30.0	7th
2001	15	32	.319	16.5	7th (1st half)
2001	19	29	.396	15.0	6th (2nd half)

== Postseason results ==
The Bluesmen qualified for the postseason twice, in both of their season in the Big South League. The team won the league championship in each year.

Year	Semifinals		Finals	
1996	Pine Bluff Locomotives	W (2-1)	Columbia Mules	W (3-0)
1997			Meridian Brakemen	W (3-0)

== Attendance ==
The following is a list of Bluesmen attendance figures in both the Big South League (1996–1997) and Texas–Louisiana League (1998–2001). In six season, the Bluesmen had a total attendance of 156,789 spectators, for an average of 26,132 per season.

Season	Total Attendance	League Rank
1996	36,532	3rd
1997	17,022	2nd
1998	27,948	7th
1999	35,519	6th
2000	24,927	7th
2001	14,841	7th
Total	156,789	N/A
