= List of English football transfers winter 2010–11 =

The 2010–11 winter transfer window for English football transfers opened on 1 January and closed at 23:00 GMT on 31 January 2011. Additionally, players without a club could join at any time, clubs below Premier League level could sign players on loan at any time, and clubs could sign a goalkeeper on an emergency loan if they had no registered goalkeeper available. This list includes transfers featuring at least one Premier League or Championship club which were completed after the end of the summer 2010 transfer window and before the end of the 2010–11 winter window.

== Transfers ==
Date	Name	Moving from	Moving to	Fee
1 September 2010	James Hurst	Portsmouth	West Bromwich Albion	Undisclosed
2 September 2010	Elliott Cox	Queens Park Rangers	Tooting & Mitcham United	Loan
2 September 2010	Richard Kingson	Unattached	Blackpool	Free
2 September 2010	Pat O'Connor	Millwall	Tooting & Mitcham United	Loan
3 September 2010	Andy Marshall	Unattached	Aston Villa	Free
8 September 2010	Theo Robinson	Huddersfield Town	Millwall	Loan
8 September 2010	James Vaughan	Everton	Crystal Palace	Loan
9 September 2010	Amdy Faye	Unattached	Leeds United	Free
9 September 2010	Martin John	Cardiff City	Newport County	Loan
9 September 2010	Jake Kean	Blackburn Rovers	Hartlepool United	Loan
9 September 2010	Liam O'Brien	Portsmouth	Eastbourne Borough	Loan
9 September 2010	Danny Rose	Tottenham Hotspur	Bristol City	Loan
9 September 2010	Tommy Smith	Portsmouth	Queens Park Rangers	Loan
9 September 2010	Gavin Williams	Bristol City	Yeovil Town	Loan
10 September 2010	Lee Brown	Queens Park Rangers	Hayes & Yeading	Loan
10 September 2010	Andy Frampton	Millwall	Leyton Orient	Loan
10 September 2010	Garry O'Connor	Birmingham City	Barnsley	Loan
10 September 2010	Danny Ward	Bolton Wanderers	Coventry City	Loan
11 September 2010	Daniel Ayala	Liverpool	Hull City	Loan
11 September 2010	Jason Brown	Blackburn Rovers	Leeds United	Loan
13 September 2010	Shefki Kuqi	Swansea City	Derby County	Loan
13 September 2010	Kyle Walker	Tottenham Hotspur	Queens Park Rangers	Loan
16 September 2010	Marlon Jackson	Bristol City	Aldershot Town	Loan
16 September 2010	Oliver Norwood	Manchester United	Carlisle United	Loan
17 September 2010	Luke Daniels	West Bromwich Albion	Charlton Athletic	Loan
17 September 2010	Péter Gulácsi	Liverpool	Tranmere Rovers	Loan
17 September 2010	Stephen Henderson	Bristol City	Yeovil Town	Loan
17 September 2010	Iain Hume	Barnsley	Preston North End	Loan
17 September 2010	Yves Ma-Kalambay	Unattached	Swansea City	Free
17 September 2010	Frank Nouble	West Ham United	Swansea City	Loan
17 September 2010	Chris Riggott	Unattached	Cardiff City	Free
20 September 2010	Marlon King	Unattached	Coventry City	Free
21 September 2010	Ben Tozer	Newcastle United	Northampton Town	Loan
21 September 2010	Richard Wright	Unattached	Sheffield United	Free
22 September 2010	Matt Gill	Norwich City	Peterborough United	Loan
23 September 2010	Jake Livermore	Tottenham Hotspur	Ipswich Town	Loan
23 September 2010	George McCartney	Sunderland	Leeds United	Loan
23 September 2010	Adam Smith	Tottenham Hotspur	Bournemouth	Loan
23 September 2010	Chris Wood	West Bromwich Albion	Barnsley	Loan
24 September 2010	Luke Moore	West Bromwich Albion	Derby County	Loan
25 September 2010	Ritchie de Laet	Manchester United	Sheffield United	Loan
26 September 2010	Steven Caulker	Tottenham Hotspur	Bristol City	Loan
27 September 2010	Ryan Noble	Sunderland	Derby County	Loan
28 September 2010	Yven Moyo	(France) Sochaux	Newcastle United	Undisclosed
28 September 2010	Andrew Wright	Scunthorpe United	Grimsby Town	Loan
29 September 2010	Reece Brown	Manchester United	Bradford City	Loan
29 September 2010	Oliver Gill	Manchester United	Bradford City	Loan
30 September 2010	Richard Chaplow	Preston North End	Southampton	Loan
30 September 2010	Michael Kay	Sunderland	Gateshead	Loan
30 September 2010	Elian Parrino	(Argentina) Estudiantes LP	Sheffield United	Loan
30 September 2010	Tommy Williams	Bristol City	Colchester United	Loan
30 September 2010	Scott Wootton	Manchester United	Tranmere Rovers	Loan
1 October 2010	Rowan Vine	Queens Park Rangers	Hull City	Loan
1 October 2010	Josh Parker	Queens Park Rangers	Northampton Town	Loan
4 October 2010	Matt Ritchie	Portsmouth	Swindon Town	Loan
5 October 2010	Cedric Evina	Arsenal	Oldham Athletic	Loan
6 October 2010	Mihkel Aksalu	Sheffield United	Mansfield Town	Loan
6 October 2010	Andrew Davies	Stoke City	Walsall	Loan
6 October 2010	Waide Fairhurst	Doncaster Rovers	Southend United	Loan
6 October 2010	George Francomb	Norwich City	Barnet	Loan
8 October 2010	Nicholas Bignall	Reading	Southampton	Loan
8 October 2010	Lewis Grabban	Millwall	Brentford	Loan
8 October 2010	Aristote Nsiala	Everton	Macclesfield Town	Loan
8 October 2010	Joe Oastler	Queens Park Rangers	Torquay United	Loan
9 October 2010	Robbie Clark	Doncaster Rovers	Sheffield	Loan
12 October 2010	Mike Grella	Leeds United	Carlisle United	Loan
14 October 2010	Paris Cowan-Hall	Unattached	Scunthorpe United	Free
14 October 2010	Kevin McDonald	Burnley	Scunthorpe United	Loan
14 October 2010	Kyle Naughton	Tottenham Hotspur	Leicester City	Loan
14 October 2010	Nathaniel Pinney	Crystal Palace	Dagenham & Redbridge	Loan
15 October 2010	Jack Colback	Sunderland	Ipswich Town	Loan
15 October 2010	James Collins	Aston Villa	Burton Albion	Loan
15 October 2010	Curtis Davies	Aston Villa	Leicester City	Loan
15 October 2010	Frank Fielding	Blackburn Rovers	Derby County	Loan
15 October 2010	Kevin Long	Burnley	Accrington Stanley	Loan
16 October 2010	Wes Fletcher	Burnley	Stockport County	Loan
18 October 2010	Marvin Emnes	Middlesbrough	Swansea City	Loan
18 October 2010	Gavin Mahon	Unattached	Queens Park Rangers	Free
18 October 2010	Vito Mannone	Arsenal	Hull City	Loan
19 October 2010	Greg Halford	Wolverhampton Wanderers	Portsmouth	Loan
19 October 2010	Freddie Sears	West Ham United	Scunthorpe United	Loan
20 October 2010	Matt Hill	Wolverhampton Wanderers	Barnsley	Loan
20 October 2010	Joseph Mills	Southampton	Doncaster Rovers	Loan
20 October 2010	Darius Vassell	Unattached	Leicester City	Free
21 October 2010	Greg Cunningham	Manchester City	Leicester City	Loan
22 October 2010	Conor Clifford	Chelsea	Plymouth Argyle	Loan
22 October 2010	Corry Evans	Manchester United	Carlisle United	Loan
22 October 2010	Hérold Goulon	Unattached	Blackburn Rovers	Free
22 October 2010	Ashley Hemmings	Wolverhampton Wanderers	Torquay United	Loan
22 October 2010	Scott Malone	Wolverhampton Wanderers	Burton Albion	Loan
22 October 2010	Tope Obadeyi	Bolton Wanderers	Shrewsbury Town	Loan
22 October 2010	Romone Rose	Queens Park Rangers	Torquay United	Loan
22 October 2010	Tony Warner	Unattached	Scunthorpe United	Free
23 October 2010	Mark Randall	Arsenal	Rotherham United	Loan
27 October 2010	Jay O'Shea	Birmingham City	Stevenage	Loan
28 October 2010	Andy Frampton	Millwall	Swindon Town	Loan
28 October 2010	Paul Hayes	Preston North End	Barnsley	Loan
29 October 2010	Ashley Grimes	Millwall	Lincoln City	Loan
29 October 2010	Gavin Hoyte	Arsenal	Lincoln City	Loan
29 October 2010	Carl Ikeme	Wolverhampton Wanderers	Leicester City	Loan
29 October 2010	Andy O'Brien	Bolton Wanderers	Leeds United	Loan
29 October 2010	Andy Reid	Sunderland	Sheffield United	Loan
29 October 2010	Liam Rosenior	Unattached	Hull City	Free
29 October 2010	Solomon Taiwo	Cardiff City	Dagenham & Redbridge	Loan
1 November 2010	Stephen Darby	Liverpool	Notts County	Loan
1 November 2010	Thomas Ince	Liverpool	Notts County	Loan
1 November 2010	Lewin Nyatanga	Bristol City	Peterborough United	Loan
2 November 2010	Benik Afobe	Arsenal	Huddersfield Town	Loan
2 November 2010	Liam Dickinson	Barnsley	Walsall	Loan
2 November 2010	Giorgos Tofas	Unattached	Queens Park Rangers	Free
3 November 2010	Thomas Cruise	Arsenal	Carlisle United	Loan
4 November 2010	Nicky Featherstone	Hull City	Hereford United	Loan
4 November 2010	David Healy	Sunderland	Doncaster Rovers	Loan
4 November 2010	Victor Pálsson	Liverpool	Dagenham & Redbridge	Loan
5 November 2010	Antonio German	Queens Park Rangers	Oxford United	Loan
8 November 2010	Garry O'Connor	Birmingham City	Barnsley	Loan
8 November 2010	Dennis Souza	Unattached	Doncaster Rovers	Free
9 November 2010	Kayleden Brown	West Bromwich Albion	Dagenham & Redbridge	Loan
9 November 2010	Lee Nicholls	Wigan Athletic	Hartlepool United	Loan
12 November 2010	Dany N'Guessan	Leicester City	Scunthorpe United	Loan
12 November 2010	Marcus Williams	Reading	Peterborough United	Loan
16 November 2010	Adam Phillips	Chelsea	Yeovil Town	Loan
17 November 2010	Ritchie De Laet	Manchester United	Preston North End	Loan
17 November 2010	Danny Pugh	Stoke City	Preston North End	Loan
17 November 2010	Michael Tonge	Stoke City	Preston North End	Loan
18 November 2010	Robert Pires	Unattached	Aston Villa	Free
19 November 2010	Jack Ainsley	Ipswich Town	Histon	Loan
19 November 2010	Calvin Andrew	Crystal Palace	Millwall	Loan
19 November 2010	Jason Brown	Blackburn Rovers	Leyton Orient	Loan
19 November 2010	Adam Clayton	Leeds United	Peterborough United	Loan
19 November 2010	Lee Miller	Middlesbrough	Notts County	Loan
19 November 2010	Jason Puncheon	Southampton	Millwall	Loan
19 November 2010	Aman Verma	Leicester City	Darlington	Loan
19 November 2010	Chris Wood	West Bromwich Albion	Brighton & Hove Albion	Loan
22 November 2010	Henri Lansbury	Arsenal	Norwich City	Loan
22 November 2010	Ivan Sproule	Bristol City	Yeovil Town	Loan
23 November 2010	Mikele Leigertwood	Queens Park Rangers	Reading	Loan
23 November 2010	Josh Parker	Queens Park Rangers	Wycombe Wanderers	Loan
24 November 2010	Roman Bednář	West Bromwich Albion	Leicester City	Loan
24 November 2010	Miguel Comminges	Cardiff City	Carlisle United	Loan
24 November 2010	Chris Hussey	Coventry City	Crewe Alexandra	Loan
25 November 2010	Will Atkinson	Hull City	Rotherham United	Loan
25 November 2010	Abdulai Bell-Baggie	Reading	Crawley Town	Loan
25 November 2010	Leon Cort	Burnley	Preston North End	Loan
25 November 2010	Paul Downing	West Bromwich Albion	Rotherham United	Loan
25 November 2010	Jermaine Easter	Milton Keynes Dons	Swansea City	Loan
25 November 2010	Ashley Eastham	Blackpool	Carlisle United	Loan
25 November 2010	Rory Fallon	Plymouth Argyle	Ipswich Town	Loan
25 November 2010	John Guidetti	Manchester City	Burnley	Loan
25 November 2010	Chris Kirkland	Wigan Athletic	Leicester City	Loan
25 November 2010	Josh King	Manchester United	Preston North End	Loan
25 November 2010	Simon Locke	Reading	Dagenham & Redbridge	Loan
25 November 2010	Matthew Lund	Stoke City	Hereford United	Loan
25 November 2010	Josh McQuoid	Bournemouth	Millwall	Loan
25 November 2010	Eddie Oshodi	Watford	Dagenham & Redbridge	Loan
25 November 2010	Tom Parks	Leicester City	Yeovil Town	Loan
25 November 2010	Aaron Ramsey	Arsenal	Nottingham Forest	Loan
25 November 2010	Cameron Stewart	Manchester United	Hull City	Loan
25 November 2010	Neal Trotman	Preston North End	Oldham Athletic	Loan
25 November 2010	Marcus Tudgay	Sheffield Wednesday	Nottingham Forest	Loan
25 November 2010	Andrew Tutte	Manchester City	Rochdale	Loan
25 November 2010	Rowan Vine	Queens Park Rangers	Brentford	Loan
25 November 2010	Josh Walker	Watford	Stevenage	Loan
25 November 2010	James Wallace	Everton	Bury	Loan
25 November 2010	Michael Woods	Chelsea	Notts County	Loan
25 November 2010	Gianni Zuiverloon	West Bromwich Albion	Ipswich Town	Loan
26 November 2010	Mitch McPike	Birmingham City	Kidderminster Harriers	Loan
27 November 2010	Anders Lindegaard	(Norway) Aalesund	Manchester United	Undisclosed
11 December 2010	Garry O'Connor	Birmingham City	Barnsley	Undisclosed
13 December 2010	Gai Assulin	Unattached	Manchester City	Free
21 December 2010	Nahki Wells	Unattached	Carlisle United	Free
23 December 2010	Robbie Findley	(United States) Major League Soccer (Real Salt Lake)	Nottingham Forest	Free
29 December 2010	Jermaine Pennant	(Spain) Real Zaragoza	Stoke City	Undisclosed
30 December 2010	Aaron Wilbraham	Milton Keynes Dons	Norwich City	Undisclosed
30 December 2010	Richard Chaplow	Preston North End	Southampton	Undisclosed
30 December 2010	Aaron McLean	Peterborough United	Hull City	Undisclosed
30 December 2010	Scott Donnelly	Swansea City	Wycombe Wanderers	Loan
31 December 2010	Adrián López Rodríguez	(Spain) Deportivo	Wigan Athletic	Free
31 December 2010	Brad Guzan	Aston Villa	Hull City	Loan
1 January 2011	Louis Almond	Blackpool	Barrow	Loan
1 January 2011	Max Ehmer	Queens Park Rangers	Yeovil Town	Loan
1 January 2011	Matty Fryatt	Leicester City	Hull City	£1.2m
1 January 2011	Iain Hume	Barnsley	Preston North End	Undisclosed
1 January 2011	Steffen Iversen	(Norway) Rosenborg	Crystal Palace	Free
1 January 2011	Kevin Kilbane	Hull City	Huddersfield Town	Loan
1 January 2011	Liam Lawrence	Stoke City	Portsmouth	Undisclosed
1 January 2011	Andy O'Brien	Bolton Wanderers	Leeds United	Undisclosed
1 January 2011	Jon Parkin	Preston North End	Cardiff City	Undisclosed
1 January 2011	Tommy Smith	Portsmouth	Queens Park Rangers	Undisclosed
1 January 2011	Petter Vaagan Moen	(Norway) Brann	Queens Park Rangers	Free
1 January 2011	Abdillahie Yussuf	Leicester City	Tamworth	Loan
2 January 2011	Sol Bamba	(Scotland) Hibernian	Leicester City	Undisclosed
2 January 2011	Ben Mee	Manchester City	Leicester City	Loan
3 January 2011	Federico Macheda	Manchester United	(Italy) Sampdoria	Loan
4 January 2011	Stephen Henderson	Bristol City	Yeovil Town	Loan
4 January 2011	Kern Miller	Lincoln City	Barnsley	Free
5 January 2011	Hatem Ben Arfa	(France) Marseille	Newcastle United	Undisclosed
5 January 2011	Luke Daniels	West Bromwich Albion	Bristol Rovers	Loan
5 January 2011	Marc Laird	Millwall	Brentford	Undisclosed
5 January 2011	Marcus Tudgay	Sheffield Wednesday	Nottingham Forest	Undisclosed
6 January 2011	Keiran Agard	Everton	Peterborough United	Loan
6 January 2011	Seamus Conneely	(Republic of Ireland) Galway United	Sheffield United	Undisclosed
6 January 2011	Mark Cullen	Hull City	Bradford City	Loan
6 January 2011	Brian Easton	Burnley	Bradford City	Loan
6 January 2011	Liam Dickinson	Barnsley	Rochdale	Loan
6 January 2011	Ashley Eastham	Blackpool	Cheltenham Town	Loan
6 January 2011	Ben Gordon	Chelsea	Scunthorpe United	Loan
6 January 2011	Michael Kay	Sunderland	Tranmere Rovers	Loan
6 January 2011	Alex Marrow	Blackburn Rovers	Crystal Palace	Undisclosed
6 January 2011	David McAllister	(Republic of Ireland) St Patrick's Athletic	Sheffield United	Undisclosed
6 January 2011	Josh McQuoid	Bournemouth	Millwall	Undisclosed
6 January 2011	Lee Miller	Middlesbrough	Notts County	Loan
6 January 2011	Eddie Nolan	Preston North End	Scunthorpe United	Undisclosed
6 January 2011	Kyle Walker	Tottenham Hotspur	Aston Villa	Loan
6 January 2011	Michael Liddle	Sunderland	Gateshead	Loan
7 January 2011	Ben Amos	Manchester United	Oldham Athletic	Loan
7 January 2011	James Chester	Manchester United	Hull City	Undisclosed
7 January 2011	James Collins	Aston Villa	Shrewsbury Town	Loan
7 January 2011	Ishmel Demontagnac	Blackpool	Stockport County	Loan
7 January 2011	Edin Džeko	(Germany) VfL Wolfsburg	Manchester City	£27m
7 January 2011	Matthew Grieve	Newcastle United	Stockport County	Loan
7 January 2011	Stephen Husband	Blackpool	Stockport County	Loan
7 January 2011	Harry Kane	Tottenham Hotspur	Leyton Orient	Loan
7 January 2011	Bongani Khumalo	(South Africa) SuperSport United	Tottenham Hotspur	£1.5m
7 January 2011	Vito Mannone	Arsenal	Hull City	Loan
7 January 2011	Luke Moore	West Bromwich Albion	Swansea City	Undisclosed
7 January 2011	Michael Morrison	Leicester City	Sheffield Wednesday	Undisclosed
7 January 2011	Jonathan Obika	Tottenham Hotspur	Peterborough United	Loan
7 January 2011	Matt Ritchie	Portsmouth	Swindon Town	Undisclosed
7 January 2011	Steve Sidwell	Aston Villa	Fulham	Undisclosed
7 January 2011	Jóan Símun Edmundsson	Newcastle United	Gateshead	Loan
7 January 2011	James Tavernier	Newcastle United	Gateshead	Loan
10 January 2011	Liam Cooper	Hull City	Carlisle United	Loan
10 January 2011	Tamás Kádár	Newcastle United	Huddersfield Town	Loan
10 January 2011	Liam Noble	Sunderland	Carlisle United	Loan
11 January 2011	Zac Thompson	Everton	Leeds United	Free
11 January 2011	Danny Philliskirk	Chelsea	Sheffield United	Loan
12 January 2011	David Bentley	Tottenham Hotspur	Birmingham City	Loan
12 January 2011	Wayne Bridge	Manchester City	West Ham United	Loan
12 January 2011	John Dunleavy	Wolverhampton Wanderers	Barnet	Loan
12 January 2011	Matthew Kilgallon	Sunderland	Doncaster Rovers	Loan
13 January 2011	Nick Blackman	Blackburn Rovers	(Scotland) Aberdeen	Loan
13 January 2011	Mauro Boselli	Wigan Athletic	(Italy) Genoa	Loan
13 January 2011	Nathan Eccleston	Liverpool	Charlton Athletic	Loan
13 January 2011	Nathan Ellington	Watford	Preston North End	Loan
13 January 2011	Greg Halford	Wolverhampton Wanderers	Portsmouth	Loan
13 January 2011	Julian Kelly	Reading	Lincoln City	Loan
13 January 2011	Shane Lowry	Aston Villa	Sheffield United	Loan
13 January 2011	Amine Linganzi	Blackburn Rovers	Preston North End	Loan
13 January 2011	Joe Mattock	West Bromwich Albion	Sheffield United	Loan
13 January 2011	Jason Banton	Blackburn Rovers	Liverpool	Undisclosed
13 January 2011	Theo Robinson	Huddersfield Town	Millwall	Undisclosed
13 January 2011	Marc Tierney	Colchester United	Norwich City	Undisclosed
13 January 2011	Yakubu	Everton	Leicester City	Loan
14 January 2011	Ritchie De Laet	Manchester United	Portsmouth	Loan
14 January 2011	Jermaine Easter	Milton Keynes Dons	Crystal Palace	Undisclosed
14 January 2011	Corry Evans	Manchester United	Hull City	Loan
14 January 2011	Abdisalam Ibrahim	Manchester City	Scunthorpe United	Loan
14 January 2011	Oli Johnson	Norwich City	Yeovil Town	Loan
14 January 2011	Alan Judge	Blackburn Rovers	Notts County	Undisclosed
14 January 2011	George McCartney	Sunderland	Leeds United	Loan
14 January 2011	Ľubomír Michalík	Leeds United	Carlisle United	Free
14 January 2011	Paul Reid	Colchester United	Scunthorpe United	Undisclosed
14 January 2011	Roque Santa Cruz	Manchester City	Blackburn Rovers	Loan
14 January 2011	Callum Wilson	Coventry City	Kettering Town	Loan
14 January 2011	Marc Warren	(Australia) Central Coast Mariners	Sheffield United	Undisclosed
15 January 2011	Jean Makoun	(France) Lyon	Aston Villa	£6m
15 January 2011	Rowan Vine	Queens Park Rangers	Milton Keynes Dons	Loan
17 January 2011	John Akinde	Bristol City	Dagenham & Redbridge	Loan
17 January 2011	Cian Bolger	Leicester City	Bristol Rovers	Loan
17 January 2011	Paul Keegan	(Republic of Ireland) Bohemians	Doncaster Rovers	Free
18 January 2011	Darren Bent	Sunderland	Aston Villa	£18m
18 January 2011	Marcus Bent	Birmingham City	Sheffield United	Loan
18 January 2011	Jay Emmanuel-Thomas	Arsenal	Cardiff City	Loan
18 January 2011	Mark Halstead	Blackpool	Kettering Town	Loan
18 January 2011	Jermaine Jones	(Germany) Schalke 04	Blackburn Rovers	Loan
18 January 2011	Sean Morrison	Swindon Town	Reading	Undisclosed
18 January 2011	Brett Williams	Eastleigh	Reading	£50k
18 January 2011	Jens Berthel Askou	Norwich City	Millwall	Loan
18 January 2011	Ben Hamer	Reading	Exeter City	Loan
18 January 2011	Andreas Weimann	Aston Villa	Watford	Loan
20 January 2011	Tijani Belaid	(Czech Republic) Slavia Prague	Hull City	Free
20 January 2011	Leon Britton	Sheffield United	Swansea City	Undisclosed
20 January 2011	Trevor Carson	Sunderland	Lincoln City	Loan
20 January 2011	Ben Davies	Notts County	Derby County	Undisclosed
20 January 2011	Eric Dier	(Portugal) Sporting CP	Everton	Loan
20 January 2011	Mark Duffy	Morecambe	Scunthorpe United	Undisclosed
20 January 2011	Adam Hammill	Barnsley	Wolverhampton Wanderers	Undisclosed
20 January 2011	Danny Haynes	Bristol City	Barnsley	Undisclosed
20 January 2011	Mike Grella	Leeds United	(Scotland) Motherwell	Loan
20 January 2011	Tom Kennedy	Leicester City	Peterborough United	Loan
20 January 2011	Jay O'Shea	Birmingham City	Port Vale	Loan
20 January 2011	Andros Townsend	Tottenham Hotspur	Watford	Loan
20 January 2011	Javan Vidal	Manchester City	Chesterfield	Loan
20 January 2011	David Wheater	Middlesbrough	Bolton Wanderers	£2.3m
21 January 2011	Míchel	Birmingham City	(Greece) AEK Athens	Loan
21 January 2011	Kayleden Brown	West Bromwich Albion	Port Vale	Loan
21 January 2011	John Carew	Aston Villa	Stoke City	Loan
21 January 2011	Luke Daley	Norwich City	Stevenage	Loan
21 January 2011	Stephen Darby	Liverpool	Notts County	Loan
21 January 2011	Matthew Gill	Norwich City	Walsall	Loan
21 January 2011	Ryan Harley	Exeter City	Swansea City	Free
21 January 2011	Ryan Harley	Swansea City	Exeter City	Loan
21 January 2011	Ryan Mason	Tottenham Hotspur	Doncaster Rovers	Loan
21 January 2011	Darren Purse	Unattached	Millwall	Free
21 January 2011	Romaine Sawyers	West Bromwich Albion	Port Vale	Loan
21 January 2011	Owain Tudur Jones	Norwich City	Brentford	Loan
22 January 2011	Ishmael Miller	West Bromwich Albion	Queens Park Rangers	Loan
22 January 2011	Aaron Ramsey	Arsenal	Cardiff City	Loan
24 January 2011	Ryan Donaldson	Newcastle United	Hartlepool United	Loan
24 January 2011	Lewis Grabban	Millwall	Brentford	Free
24 January 2011	Nathan Redmond	Birmingham City	Burton Albion	Loan
25 January 2011	David Amoo	Liverpool	Milton Keynes Dons	Loan
25 January 2011	Ryan Babel	Liverpool	(Germany) 1899 Hoffenheim	£6m
25 January 2011	Michael Doyle	Coventry City	Sheffield United	Free
25 January 2011	Craig Eastmond	Arsenal	Millwall	Loan
25 January 2011	Jonathan Hogg	Aston Villa	Portsmouth	Loan
25 January 2011	Henri Lansbury	Arsenal	Norwich City	Loan
25 January 2011	Gary O'Neil	Middlesbrough	West Ham United	Undisclosed
26 January 2011	Valon Behrami	West Ham United	(Italy) Fiorentina	Undisclosed
26 January 2011	Aaron Doran	Blackburn Rovers	(Scotland) Inverness Caledonian Thistle	Loan
26 January 2011	Gaël Kakuta	Chelsea	Fulham	Loan
26 January 2011	Dany N'Guessan	Leicester City	Southampton	Loan
26 January 2011	James Vaughan	Everton	Crystal Palace	Loan
26 January 2011	Patrick van Aanholt	Chelsea	Leicester City	Loan
27 January 2011	Emmanuel Adebayor	Manchester City	(Spain) Real Madrid	Loan
27 January 2011	Jimmy Bullard	Hull City	Ipswich Town	Loan
27 January 2011	Tommy Carroll	Tottenham Hotspur	Leyton Orient	Loan
27 January 2011	Kris Commons	Derby County	(Scotland) Celtic	Undisclosed
27 January 2011	Joe Dudgeon	Manchester United	Carlisle United	Loan
27 January 2011	Matt Hill	Unattached	Barnsley	Free
27 January 2011	Eddie Oshodi	Watford	Rushden & Diamonds	Loan
27 January 2011	Danny Shittu	Unattached	Queens Park Rangers	Free
27 January 2011	Aidan White	Leeds United	Oldham Athletic	Loan
28 January 2011	Benik Afobe	Arsenal	Huddersfield Town	Loan
28 January 2011	Charlie Austin	Swindon Town	Burnley	Undisclosed
28 January 2011	Demba Ba	(Germany) 1899 Hoffenheim	West Ham United	Undisclosed
28 January 2011	Leon Clarke	Queens Park Rangers	Preston North End	Loan
28 January 2011	Curtis Davies	Aston Villa	Birmingham City	Undisclosed
28 January 2011	Danny Drinkwater	Manchester United	Watford	Loan
28 January 2011	Cedric Evina	Arsenal	Oldham Athletic	Free
28 January 2011	Will Hatfield	Leeds United	York City	Loan
28 January 2011	Lee Miller	Middlesbrough	Scunthorpe United	Loan
28 January 2011	Dan Preston	Birmingham City	Hereford United	Loan
28 January 2011	Reuben Reid	West Bromwich Albion	Oldham Athletic	Free
28 January 2011	Carlos Vela	Arsenal	West Bromwich Albion	Loan
28 January 2011	Josh Walker	Watford	Northampton Town	Loan
29 January 2011	Sulley Muntari	(Italy) Internazionale	Sunderland	Loan
29 January 2011	Stéphane Sessègnon	(France) Paris Saint-Germain	Sunderland	£6m
29 January 2011	John Utaka	Portsmouth	(France) Montpellier	Undisclosed
30 January 2011	Jamie O'Hara	Tottenham Hotspur	Wolverhampton Wanderers	Loan
30 January 2011	David Healy	Sunderland	(Scotland) Rangers	Free
30 January 2011	Robbie Keane	Tottenham Hotspur	West Ham United	Loan+£1m
31 January 2011	Medi Abalimba	Derby County	Oldham Athletic	Free
31 January 2011	Kieran Agard	Everton	(Scotland) Kilmarnock	Loan
31 January 2011	Ian Ashbee	Hull City	Preston North End	Undisclosed
31 January 2011	Adriano Basso	Unattached	Wolverhampton Wanderers	Free
31 January 2011	James Beattie	(Scotland) Rangers	Blackpool	Loan
31 January 2011	Federico Bessone	Leeds United	Charlton Athletic	Loan
31 January 2011	Nicholas Bignall	Reading	Brentford	Loan
31 January 2011	Michael Bradley	(Germany) Borussia Mönchengladbach	Aston Villa	Loan
31 January 2011	Ryan Burge	(Spain) Jerez Industrial	Doncaster Rovers	Undisclosed
31 January 2011	Neill Collins	Leeds United	Sheffield United	Undisclosed
31 January 2011	Jason Crowe	Leeds United	Leyton Orient	Free
31 January 2011	Paulo da Silva	Sunderland	(Spain) Real Zaragoza	Undisclosed
31 January 2011	David Davis	Wolverhampton Wanderers	Shrewsbury Town	Loan
31 January 2011	Paul Downing	West Bromwich Albion	Shrewsbury Town	Loan
31 January 2011	Giovani dos Santos	Tottenham Hotspur	(Spain) Racing Santander	Loan
31 January 2011	Andy Drury	Luton Town	Ipswich Town	£150k
31 January 2011	Tom Elliott	Leeds United	(Scotland) Hamilton Academical	Free
31 January 2011	Mauro Formica	(Argentina) Newell's Old Boys	Blackburn Rovers	Undisclosed
31 January 2011	Jonathan Forte	Scunthorpe United	Southampton	Undisclosed
31 January 2011	Ethan Gage	Unattached	Reading	Free
31 January 2011	Joe Garner	Nottingham Forest	Scunthorpe United	Loan
31 January 2011	Michael Nelson	Norwich City	Scunthorpe United	Undisclosed
31 January 2011	David González	Manchester City	Leeds United	Loan
31 January 2011	Maximilian Haas	(Germany) Bayern Munich	Middlesbrough	Undisclosed
31 January 2011	Stephen Ireland	Aston Villa	Newcastle United	Loan
31 January 2011	Andy Keogh	Wolverhampton Wanderers	Bristol City	Loan
31 January 2011	Paul Konchesky	Liverpool	Nottingham Forest	Loan
31 January 2011	Alex MacDonald	Burnley	(Scotland) Inverness Caledonian Thistle	Loan
31 January 2011	Obafemi Martins	(Russia) Rubin Kazan	Birmingham City	Loan
31 January 2011	Keanu Marsh-Brown	Fulham	Milton Keynes Dons	Loan
31 January 2011	Paul McCallum	Dulwich Hamlet	West Ham United	Undisclosed
31 January 2011	Jacob Mellis	Chelsea	Barnsley	Loan
31 January 2011	Greg Mills	Derby County	Telford United	Loan
31 January 2011	Joseph Mills	Southampton	Doncaster Rovers	Loan
31 January 2011	Louis Moult	Stoke City	Mansfield Town	Loan
31 January 2011	Dean Moxey	Derby County	Crystal Palace	Undisclosed
31 January 2011	Lee Nicholls	Wigan Athletic	Shrewsbury Town	Loan
31 January 2011	Frank Nouble	West Ham United	Barnsley	Loan
31 January 2011	Luke O'Neill	Leicester City	Kettering Town	Loan
31 January 2011	Erik Opsahl	Unattached	Reading	Free
31 January 2011	Isaiah Osbourne	Aston Villa	Sheffield Wednesday	Loan
31 January 2011	Andy Reid	Sunderland	Blackpool	Undisclosed
31 January 2011	Ricardo	Unattached	Leicester City	Free
31 January 2011	Rubén Rochina	(Spain) Barcelona	Blackburn Rovers	Undisclosed
31 January 2011	Steven Smith	Norwich City	(Scotland) Aberdeen	Loan
31 January 2011	Cameron Stewart	Manchester United	Hull City	Undisclosed
31 January 2011	Daniel Sturridge	Chelsea	Bolton Wanderers	Loan
31 January 2011	Luis Suárez	(Netherlands) Ajax	Liverpool	£23m
31 January 2011	Conor Thomas	Coventry City	Liverpool	Loan
31 January 2011	Tuncay	Stoke City	(Germany) VfL Wolfsburg	£4.5m
31 January 2011	Andrew Tutte	Manchester City	Yeovil Town	Loan
31 January 2011	Chima Daniel Uchechi	(Belgium) FCV Dender EH	Leicester City	Loan
31 January 2011	Martyn Woolford	Scunthorpe United	Bristol City	Undisclosed
31 January 2011	Merouane Zemmama	(Scotland) Hibernian	Middlesbrough	Undisclosed
31 January 2011	Fernando Torres	Liverpool	Chelsea	£50m
31 January 2011	Andy Carroll	Newcastle United	Liverpool	£35m
31 January 2011	David Luiz	(Portugal) Benfica	Chelsea	£21.3m
31 January 2011	Eiður Guðjohnsen	Stoke City	Fulham	Loan
31 January 2011	Eddie Johnson	Fulham	Preston North End	Loan

== Notes and references ==
General

- "Transfers – September 2010". BBC Sport. BBC. 30 September 2010.
- "Transfers – October 2010". BBC Sport. BBC. 31 October 2010.
- "Transfers – November 2010". BBC Sport. BBC. 30 November 2010.
- "Transfers – December 2010". BBC Sport. BBC. 30 December 2010.
- "Transfers – January 2011". BBC Sport. BBC. 28 January 2011.

Specific
