= Ben Geraghty =

American baseball player (1912–1963)

- Geraghty as manager of the Jacksonville Braves in 1953
- Infielder
- Born: July 19, 1912; Jersey City, New Jersey, U.S.
- Died: June 18, 1963 (aged 50); Jacksonville, Florida, U.S.
- Batted: Right Threw: Right

MLB debut
- April 17, 1936, for the Brooklyn Dodgers

Last MLB appearance
- September 14, 1944, for the Boston Braves

MLB statistics
- Batting average: .199
- Home runs: 0
- Runs batted in: 9
- Stats at Baseball Reference

Teams
- Brooklyn Dodgers (1936); Boston Braves (1943–1944)

Benjamin Raymond Geraghty (July 19, 1912 – June 18, 1963) was an American infielder in Major League Baseball and one of the most successful and respected managers of minor league baseball in the 1950s.

A Jersey City native, Geraghty went right from Villanova University to the 1936 Brooklyn Dodgers, appearing in 51 games with the team in his rookie season. He appeared in 19 more games with the Boston Braves over the 1943 and 1944 seasons, compiling a batting average of .199 in 146 at bats with 29 hits in 71 career games. In 1946, he survived a horrific bus crash that killed nine of his Spokane Indians teammates.

As he wound up his playing career, Geraghty started managing. He was part of the Milwaukee Braves system for nine years from 1953 through 1961, during which time Hank Aaron played for him. Aaron considered Geraghty the best manager he ever had. In his 18-year managing career, Geraghty won 1,432 games and lost 1,154 (.554). He won five pennants in seven years (1953–59) while piloting Braves affiliates. In the ten seasons of 1953 through 1962, a Geraghty-managed team never finished lower than second place. He was managing the Jacksonville Suns in 1963 when he suffered a fatal heart attack on June 18, just shy of his 51st birthday.

== Early life ==
Benjamin Raymond Geraghty was born on July 19, 1912, in Jersey City, New Jersey. He was the youngest of eight children of Patrick and Ida Geraghty, second-generation Americans from the Paul Hook section of Jersey City. Patrick was the first President to the first Teamsters Union of Jersey City. He owned several trucks that ran products from the Colgate Palmolive company. He was employed for over ten years as a teamster, then as a chauffeur for a tea factory, and finally as a night manager at the garage for the National Grocery Company. The Geraghtys owned 157 Grand Street in Jersey City, along with two of Ida's brothers, the four-member Greaves family, and a boarder from Sweden. Patrick died in an accident not long after Ben's 14th birthday, when he was crushed between two trucks at work. Thomas, the second-oldest boy who worked as a policeman in the community, helped raise the younger children after Patrick's death.

During his freshman and sophomore years of high school, Geraghty attended St. Peter's Preparatory School in Jersey City, where he played baseball as a pitcher and also was part of the basketball team. He transferred to St. Benedict's Preparatory School in Newark as junior. By this time, he had begun playing football as well, though his high school yearbook implied that basketball was his best sport. He graduated in 1932.

Geraghty then attended Villanova University, majoring in journalism. He continued to play baseball and basketball, both of which were coached by George Jacobs. Standing 5 feet 11 inches (1.80 m) tall and weighing 170 pounds (77 kg), Geraghty was shorter than average for a basketball player, but he scored a great deal of points and was named the team captain as a senior. For the baseball team, he played third base, though he had to battle Frank Skaff for playing time.

== Brooklyn Dodgers (1936) ==
While Geraghty was playing baseball for Villanova, scout Mel Logan recommended him to the Brooklyn Dodgers. Geraghty attended spring training for the Dodgers in 1936 and made a strong impression with manager Casey Stengel. Lonny Frey, the incumbent shortstop for the team, was error-prone and missed time in mid-March with an injury. At the close of spring training, Stengel decided to move Frey to second base and added Geraghty to the Opening Day roster.

Jimmy Jordan made the first three starts of the year at shortstop; then, Geraghty played 15 straight games at the position. Making his MLB debut on April 17, he played all 10 innings of a game against the Philadelphia Phillies, recording two hits and a run batted in (RBI) in a 4–3 Dodger victory. He batted .429 in his first 10 games. On April 19, Jimmie Wilson of the Phillies kicked the baseball away from Geraghty as he stole second base. "He won't pull that again on me. The next time I'll just take that throw and tag him on the nose with the ball," Geraghty informed Stengel. Seven days later, also against Philadelphia, Geraghty became the first of a handful of players to reach first base on catcher's interference twice during a game. Phillies catcher Earl Grace wrongly calculated that the rookie Geraghty and an inexperienced umpire would not notice him block Geraghty's swing.

A hand injury caused Geraghty to miss five games in May. Upon his return, he struggled to hit. He made just one start at shortstop after June 9, though he began getting playing time at other infield positions, such as second base and third base. After July 29, the Dodgers sent him to the Allentown Brooks of the Class A New York-Penn League. In 51 games with Brooklyn, he had batted .194 with 11 runs scored, 25 hits, and 9 RBIs. He hit no home runs for the Dodgers; in fact, Geraghty would never hit a home run professionally. Later recalling his rookie year in 1963, Geraghty said, "I knew, the first month I was up with Brooklyn, that I was not good enough to play this game. I made up my mind that if I was going to stay in baseball I'd have to do it with my head."

Finishing the 1936 season with Allentown, Geraghty batted .246 with 28 hits in 35 games. That fall, he returned to Villanova, finishing his journalism degree. He did not play at all in 1937. The exact reasons for this are unknown; though two articles from 1943 said he was in an automobile accident that year, the Dodgers placed him on their ineligible list in February. Geraghty had to appeal to commissioner Kenesaw Mountain Landis for reinstatement in order to make his return in 1938. Meanwhile, Geraghty secured a job off the field as a cemetery superintendent, which would remain his offseason occupation for several years.

== Washington Senators organization, break from the game (1937–42) ==
Geraghty's rights had been acquired by the Trenton Senators, a Class A Eastern League affiliate of the Washington Senators, in August 1937. He debuted with the team in 1938, batting .264 with 117 hits in 120 games. Trenton moved to Springfield in 1939, and Geraghty played 38 games for them, batting .233. His time was limited by a broken elbow. Another injury occurred on July 28, against the Williamsport Grays. Geraghty scored from first base on a dropped pop fly, but his celebration was short-lived, as he collapsed because of a hemorrhage. Williamsport purchased his contract after the game, and Baseball-Reference.com indicates he was under contract to the Grays in 1940, though no statistics are recorded. He sat out the 1941 and 1942 seasons, taking a job with a California shipyard before Stengel, now manager of the Boston Braves encouraged him to return east and make a comeback in 1943.

== Boston Braves (1943–44) ==
Due to World War II, all MLB teams except the St. Louis ones trained east of the Mississippi River and north of the Potomac and Ohio River, not in the south like they normally did. Training in Wallingford, Connecticut, the Braves tried to do most of their work indoors initially, but they ended this practice after Geraghty and two others suffered minor leg injuries because of the slick floor. Geraghty made the team and was still with them by the time the All-Star Game was played. However, he only appeared in eight games and only had one at bat. Mostly, he was utilized as a pinch runner; he scored two runs in this capacity. The Braves optioned him to the Eastern League's Hartford Bees on July 18, and Geraghty batted .312 in 39 games.

Geraghty started 1944 with the Braves, appearing in seven games through mid-May before again getting sent to the minors, this time to the Syracuse Chiefs of the Class AA International League. He played 84 games for the Chiefs, batting .224 with 22 RBI. Recalled by Boston in September, he played in four more games, the last appearances of his MLB career. His final game was against the Dodgers on September 14; pinch-running for Buck Etchison, he scored to give the Braves the lead, though Boston allowed runs in the eighth and ninth and lost 5–4. After going hitless with the Braves in 1943, Geraghty had four hits in 16 at bats for them in 1944. He actually began the 1945 season on Boston's roster but was sent to the minors in mid-May without having played. In 70 total MLB games, he compiled a batting average of .199 in 146 at bats with 29 hits, four of which were doubles, and nine RBI.

== Minor league player-manager (1945–48) ==
=== Indianapolis Indians ===
After being demoted in 1945, Geraghty finished out the year playing 117 games for the Indianapolis Indians of the Class AA American Association. In 117 games, he batted .270 with 63 runs scored, 111 hits, and 25 RBI. Heading west in 1946, he joined the Sacramento Solons of the Class AAA Pacific Coast League but only lasted four games before getting released. Geraghty then signed with the Spokane Indians of the Class B Western International League, with whom his life would be forever altered.

=== Survived 1946 Spokane bus tragedy ===
On June 24, 1946, Geraghty survived one of the greatest tragedies in baseball history, when the bus carrying the Spokane Indians crashed and caught fire after attempting to avert an oncoming car on a rain-slicked mountain pass. Nine players were killed; Geraghty was among the injured. He sustained a severe head wound when he was thrown through a window before the bus burst into flames, but he was able to climb up the hillside and signal for help. The Spokane club was decimated and could only continue the season with players loaned from other teams and organizations. "I guess I'm pretty lucky", Geraghty told the Associated Press the day after the crash. "I was thrown right out a window. I took the window frame right with me. I remember flying out the window, but I must have been knocked out because I don't remember landing." Geraghty's head wound required 28 stitches to close, and he was on crutches as the result of a broken kneecap.

Despite his head injury, Geraghty was named the immediate replacement for Mel Cole—the team's catcher and player-manager who perished in the crash—as the Indians' first post-accident skipper. But his injuries were too serious, and former big-leaguer Glenn Wright assumed the reins for the rest of 1946. Geraghty was able to return to Spokane to play for and manage the Indians in 1947. He appeared in 31 games for the Indians, batting .348. Meanwhile, he led them to a second-place finish and 87 victories. His health, however, would never be the same. He would manage in the minors for the next 16 seasons, but he was troubled by heart disease, cardiovascular disease and ulcers, and developed a reputation as a heavy drinker.

=== 1947–48 ===
Geraghty was released after the 1947 season. He had come into conflict with team owner Sam Collins when he criticized the release of an outfielder, but his popularity with the fans had helped him last the rest of the season before getting released. Hired by the Cleveland Indians in 1948, he started the year playing for and managing the Meridian Peps of the Class B Southeastern League. In 15 games, he batted .128 before getting released on May 30. Those games were the last time in his career he would be an active player. Later in the year, he managed the Palatka Azaleas of the Class D Florida State League as they finished the season in eighth place.

== New York Giants affiliates (1949–52) ==
Over the next four years, Geraghty managed New York Giants minor league teams. He guided the Class D Bristol Twins of the Appalachian League to a third-place finish (76–41) in 1949 and a second-place finish (74–47) in 1950. In 1951, he moved up to Class A, managing the Jacksonville Tars of the South Atlantic League (SAL). George Booker of The Sporting News wrote in August, "A great deal of the Tar success this season must be attributed to Ben Geraghty, who, with his magic touch, has turned a poor spring team into a 1951 pennant contender for the first time in years." The Tars finished second in the SAL with a 79–58 record, but they slumped to seventh in 1952 with a 69–85 record. Geraghty remained on with the team in 1953, when they changed their name to "Braves" as a result of their new affiliation with Milwaukee. That year, Geraghty managed his most famous prospect.

== Milwaukee Braves affiliates (1953–61) ==
=== Manager of young Hank Aaron (1953) ===
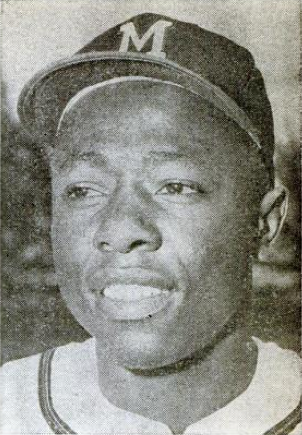
Hank Aaron considered Geraghty the greatest manager he ever played for.

One of the 1953 Jacksonville Braves was 19-year-old Hank Aaron. "He was the greatest manager I ever played for, perhaps the greatest manager who ever lived, and that includes managers in the big leagues. I've never played for a guy who could get more out of every ballplayer than he could. He knew how to communicate with everybody and to treat every player as an individual," Aaron said. Baseball's future home run king also recalled that "he chewed me out when I needed it, but he told me how good I could be and – most important – he taught me how to study the game, and never make the same mistake twice." Pat Jordan, another 1953 Jacksonville Brave, remembered that Geraghty, a white man, would regularly confront the rigid racial segregation of the times. Geraghty would insist that he and his minority players (Aaron, Horace Garner, and Felix Mantilla) be served as equals at the finest restaurants. "Invariably, they would be refused service", Jordan wrote. "While Aaron waited nervously outside, Geraghty complained loudly to the management ... They [would go] to the next best restaurant, and the next and the next, until Geraghty finally located one that would serve [them]." The Braves won the SAL pennant with a 93–44 record in 1953, and Geraghty was named the league's best manager.

=== Further years with Jacksonville (1954–58) ===
By the 1953-54 offseason, Geraghty's offseason occupation was selling TV sets. He led the Braves to another pennant in 1954, with an 83–57 record. Over the 1954-55 offseason, Geraghty managed the Caguas-Guayama Criollos of the Puerto Rican Winter League, a last-minute replacement for Mickey Owen, who chose to play for a Venezuelan team instead. In 1955, Geraghty expressed his desire that players pay attention to the game: "A guy who doesn't study to improve himself has got no place in baseball. We got enough rockheads already." He had to take several days off in June due to stomach problems. Jacksonville finished second in 1955 with a 79–61 record, and Geraghty returned to the Criollos over the offseason. Guiding them to a second-place finish, he tied Herman Franks in voting for the league's best manager, a deadlock that was settled when Franks asked that Geraghty be given the honor. Caguas-Guayama won the league title and tied for second in the subsequent Caribbean Series, played against teams from surrounding nations.

Jacksonville won their third pennant under Geraghty in 1956 with an 87–53 record. Charlie Grimm was fired as Milwaukee's manager that year, and Geraghty later noted that he was passed over when Fred Haney was named the replacement, though no articles at the time mentioned that Geraghty was a candidate. While managing Caguas-Guayama in the offseason, he discovered that he had been promoted to manage the American Association's Wichita Braves, Milwaukee's top minor league affiliate.

Geraghty's promotion brought immediate results to a team that had finished seventh the year before. "Look at what Ben Geraghty's done to that club" was a remark Frank Haraway of The Sporting News overheard many times in the season's first two months; he attributed the improvement to a change in the team's attitude. As it battled for the title, Wichita dealt with injuries to key players and saw several of their regulars promoted to the major league club, which was also in a pennant race. In fact, Geraghty recommended to Milwaukee general manager John Quinn that the team promote Bob Hazle, one of Wichita's starting outfielders. Hazle went on to bat .403 in the season's final two months, helping the parent club win the National League (NL) pennant and ultimately the 1957 World Series. Despite losing key players, Geraghty secured his fourth minor league pennant, as Wichita won the American Association title with a record of 93–61 before losing in the first round of the playoffs. He was named the league's top manager, and The Sporting News named him their Minor League Manager of the Year.

In the winter of 1957–58, Geraghty went to the Dominican Republic to manage the Estrellas Orientales. During the 1958 season, Geraghty again saw several of his star players called up by Milwaukee. Wichita got off to a slow start, improved as the year went on, but only managed to finish second this time, posting an 83–71 record. Wichita still qualified for the playoffs but lost in the first round again. That offseason, Geraghty managed Caguas-Guayama in his most physically demanding offseason yet. Geraghty first suffered a knee injuring while demonstrating a double play, then had to go to Milwaukee for treatment after getting struck by a foul ball during batting practice. This would mark the last time he managed in Latin America over the offseason.

=== Louisville Colonels (1959–61) ===
The Braves American Association affiliate became the Louisville Colonels in 1959, and Geraghty moved to Kentucky with the franchise. Dave Roberts called him Milwaukee's most respected minor league manager. Louisville won the pennant a 97–65 record, but they lost in the first round of the playoffs. Instead of managing winter ball after the season, Geraghty instructed Braves prospects in Bradenton, Florida, that fall.

When Fred Haney stepped down as Milwaukee's manager following the 1959 season, Geraghty was strongly considered for the Braves' managerial opening. Reporters noted that he was an excellent manager but that he lacked the big-name reputation of other candidates. Ultimately, Chuck Dressen was hired instead. "I think Dressen coming into our organization will mean a big difference to our personnel in Milwaukee. The boys will be better off," Geraghty graciously said in January 1960. "I know how badly he wanted to manage in the big leagues, so I know how much it hurt when he didn't get the job," Aaron recalled in 1972.

Before the 1960 season, Geraghty developed some pre-spring training routines for the young players. "This could do the boys a lot of good. ... They can accomplish more working together like this than on their own at some gymnasium. Otherwise, people hang around and talk to them and they kill a lot of time." Grimm made him part of his strategy board in Milwaukee's 1960 spring training. He started the season as Louisville's manager, but ulcers led to his hospitalization in May, and a six-month rest prescribed by doctors sidelined Geraghty for the rest of the 1960 season. He started instructing prospects again that fall and told reporters, "When my chance in the majors comes, I'll be ready."

Returning to Louisville in 1961, Geraghty managed the team for the whole year, leading the Colonels to an 80–70 record and a second-place finish. This time, the Colonels won in the American Association playoffs, allowing them to advance to the Junior World Series, where the Buffalo Bisons swept them. That September, Grimm stepped down as Milwaukee's manager. However, Birdie Tebbetts was chosen as his replacement instead. Convinced that he would never advance in Milwaukee's organization, as the Braves viewed him as more valuable as a developmental coach than a major league manager, Geraghty left the Braves' organization, having managed their teams for nine years.

== Return to Jacksonville (1962–63) ==
On October 11, 1961, Geraghty signed a three-year contract to manage Cleveland's new Class AAA team, the Jacksonville Suns. Jacksonville fans were glad to have their old manager back. That January, he underwent a four-hour operation in a Jacksonville hospital to correct a circulatory condition. Recovering in time for spring training, he led his 1962 Suns to 94 victories and earned his second Sporting News Minor League Manager of the Year Award and final pennant, although his Suns were defeated in seven games by the Atlanta Crackers in the finals of the Governors' Cup playoffs. "You've got to be lucky in this game to win," Geraghty said upon receiving the award.

Tommy John played for Geraghty in 1962 and 1963 with the Suns. He heard that Geraghty had once been a great instructor in the minor leagues, but by the time John joined the team, Geraghty tended to favor the veterans over the younger players, since the veterans needed less instruction. John also observed the impact the bus accident had on Geraghty. "I noticed that Ben never slept on long bus trips. He'd sit in his seat all night, wide awake, just staring out the window. Or when the club was at home, he'd go into his office, which was directly opposite my locker, and sit there silently chain-smoking cigarettes and swigging his beer. He'd stare at nothing, as if trying to remember something...or maybe trying to forget."

The Suns got off to a slow start in 1963, with a 26–39 record through June 17. Bobby Maduro, the team owner, discussed with Geraghty which players the club might obtain to help their performance. That night, he suffered shoulder pain. Next morning, he awoke with chest pain. His wife phoned for medical help, but Geraghty was stricken with a fatal heart attack, dying at 4:15 a.m., one month shy of his 51st birthday. "I don't know of another manager in baseball whom the paying fans held in so much respect", Bill Foley, the Florida Times-Union's sports editor, wrote upon Geraghty's death. He is interred in Jacksonville's Evergreen Cemetery.

In his 18-year managing career, Geraghty won 1,432 games and lost 1,154 (.554). He won five pennants in seven years (1953–59) while piloting Braves affiliates. In the ten seasons of 1953 through 1962, a Geraghty-managed team never finished lower than second place.

== Personal life ==
Geraghty married Mary Dowd, of Livingston, New Jersey, on November 17, 1938. They had five children: Patrick, Elizabeth, Barry, Thomas, and Benjamin Jr. (or "Benjie"). He was very superstitious, once having a lucky rabbit's foot flown to a visiting city on a Trans World Airlines flight when he forgot to bring it with him on the team's road trip. The 1946 bus crash left him in a state of constant anxiety whenever he rode buses. Jordan recalled that he would wear a lucky shirt, drink an entire case of beer, and chatter incessantly with the bus driver. "He had an amazing capacity for beer...the unusual thing about him, though, was that he never seemed to show the effects of it at all," Aaron recalled.
