= US Nœux-les-Mines =

Football club in Nœux-les-Mines, France

Nœux-les-Mines
- Full name: Union Sportive Nœux-les-Mines
- Founded: 1909
- Stadium: Stade Camille-Tisserand
- Capacity: 2,000
- President: Jérémy Wacheux
- Manager: Romain Boulert
- League: Régional 1 Hauts-de-France; Group B
- 2020–21: Régional 1 Hauts-de-France; Group B, 6th

Union Sportive Nœux-les-Mines is a football club located in Nœux-les-Mines, France. They play in the Régional 1, the sixth tier of French football. Their colours are yellow and blue. The club experienced its "golden era" during the late 1970s and early 80s, notably playing six seasons in the Division 2.

== Managerial history ==
- 1947–1948: Jean Batmale
- 1948–1949: Constant Tison
- 1955–1976: Simon Flak
- 1976–1978: Guy Debeugny
- 1976–1982: Gérard Houllier
- 1982–1983: René Sillou
- 1983–1986: Jean-Claude Devenyns
- 1995–2005: Henri Nowak
- 2005–2012: Mickaël Rollin
- 2012–2023: Romain Boulert
- 2023–present: Mimoun Zeggai

== Notable former players ==
- (France) Alain Tirloit
- (Poland) Joachim Marx
- (France) Richard Krawczyk
- (France) Raymond Kopa
- (Uruguay) Héctor Resola
- (France) Jean-Michel Godart
- (France) Hervé Flak
- (France) Patrice Bergues
- (France) Daniel Kutermak
- (France) Marc Westerloppe
- (Poland) Stefan Białas
- (France) Éric Danty
- (Netherlands) Cas Janssens
- (France) Erick Mombaerts
- (France) Alexandre Stassievitch
- (France) Simon Zimny
- (France) Daniel Wilczynski

== Honours ==
US Nœux-les-Mines honours
Honour	No.	Years
Division d'Honneur Nord	2	1948–49, 1970–71
Division 3	1	1975–76
