= Legion Field (Greenville, Mississippi) =

Baseball stadium located in Greenville, Mississippi

Coordinates: 33.385273°N 91.004455°W

Legion Field is a 4,500 seat baseball stadium located in Greenville, Mississippi. It hosted the Greenville Bluesmen from 1996 to 2001.
