= Patrice Bergues =

French footballer (born 1948)

Personal information
- Date of birth: 12 February 1948 (age 78)
- Place of birth: Créteil, France
- Position: Forward

Senior career*
Years	Team	Apps	(Gls)
1966–1980	Nœux-les-Mines		
1980–1983	Béthune		
1983–1984	Saint-Omer		

Managerial career
- 1980–1983: Béthune (player-manager)
- 1984–1990: Lens (youth coach)
- 1990–1992: Lens (head of youth dpt.)
- 1992–1996: Lens
- 1996–1998: France (assistant)
- 1998–2001: Liverpool (assistant)
- 2001–2005: Lens (director of sports)
- 2005–2007: Lyon (assistant)
- 2008–2012: France U21 (assistant)
- * Club domestic league appearances and goals

Patrice Bergues (born 12 February 1948) is a French former football player and manager who played as a forward. (Note: Patrice Bergues at WorldFootball.net)
