= Meridian Millers =

- 1949–1955; (1937–1942, 1946–1950, 1952–1955); Meridian, Mississippi

Minor league affiliations
- Class: Class B (1937–1942, 1946–1950); Class C (1952–1955)
- League: Southeastern League (1937–1942, 1946–1950); Cotton States League (1952–1955)

Major league affiliations
- Team: St. Louis Browns (1937–1938, 1941); Brooklyn Dodgers (1946); Cleveland Indians (1947–1948); Baltimore Orioles (1955)

Minor league titles
- League titles (2): 1952; 1953
- Wild card berths (4): 1949; 1950; 1954; 1955

Team data
- Name: Meridian Scrappers (1937–1939); Meridian Bears (1940); Meridian Eagles (1941–1942); Meridian Peps (1946–1948); Meridian Millers (1949–1950, 1952–1955)
- Ballpark: Fairgrounds Park (1937–1942, 1946); Buckwalter Stadium (1947–1950, 1952–1955)

The Meridian Millers were a minor league baseball team based in Meridian, Mississippi. Between 1937 and 1950, Meridian teams played as a member of the Southeastern League under various nicknames. Meridian became known as the "Millers" beginning in 1949. The Millers continued as members of the Class D level Cotton States League from 1952 to 1955 and won Cotton League championships in 1952 and 1953.

Meridien teams first hosted home minor league games at Fairgrounds Park and relocated when Buckwalter Stadium was constructed to host the team, beginning in 1947.

Meridian teams played as minor league affiliates of the St. Louis Browns (1937–1938, 1941), Brooklyn Dodgers (1946), Cleveland Indians (1947–1948) and Baltimore Orioles (1955).

== History ==
=== Early Meridian minor league teams ===
Meridian, Mississippi first hosted minor league baseball, when the 1893 Meridian "Bluebirds" began play as a member of the independent Mississippi State League. The Mississippi League folded after the 1894 season.

The 1929 Meridian Mets of the Cotton States League ended a fifteen-season tenure of Meridian membership in the Class D level league. The 1929 team directly preceded the Meriden Scrappers in minor league play.

=== 1937 to 1942 – Southeastern League ===
In 1937, Meridian returned to minor league play, when the Meridian "Scrappers" were formed and became members of the six-team Class B level Southeastern League. The Jackson Mississippians (New York Yankees affiliate), Mobile Shippers (St. Louis Cardinals), Montgomery Bombers (Cleveland Indians), Pensacola Fliers and Selma Cloverleafs (Washington Senators) teams joined with Meridian in beginning league play on April 15, 1937.

The Meridian Scrappers joined the Southeastern League playing as a minor league affiliate of the St. Louis Browns. The 1937 Meridian season ended with a 58–78 record and a fifth place finish, playing the season under managers Leonard McNair, Emmett Lipscomb and Harry Whitehouse. The Scrappers ended their initial season 25.5 games behind first place Pensacola and did not qualify for the four-teams playoffs, which were won by the Mobile Shippers.Fred Williams, who played for both Jackson and Meridian during the season, led the league with 175 total hits.

Tom Cafego played briefly for the St. Louis Browns in 1937 and also played for Meridian that season. Tom was the older brother of College Football Hall of Fame member George Cafego, who played halfback at the University of Tennessee and was the first overall selection in the 1940 NFL draft by the Chicago Cardinals. Tom Cafego supported his family, and helped his brother finish college, by playing professional baseball and also mining coal in the offseasons.

Continuing as a minor league affiliate of the St. Louis Browns in 1938, the Meriden Scrappers continued a stretch where Meriden did not make a playoff appearance. The 1938 Southeastern League expanded to become an eight-team league, adding the Anniston Rams and Gadsden Pilots teams to the league. The Scrappers again missed the playoffs with a fifth-place finish. Meriden ended the 1938 regular season with a record of 69–78, finishing 25.5 gamed behind the pennant winning Pensacola Pilots. With their fifth-place finish under returning manager Harry Whitehouse, Meriden did not qualify for the playoffs again won by the Mobile Shippers.

Continuing play in the 1939 Class B level Southeastern league, the Meridian Scrappers ended the season in last place. With a record of 55–83, Meriden placed eighth in the eight-team league regular season. Playing the season under managers Mel Simons, Harry Hughes and Bill Hughes, Meriden Did not qualify for the playoffs, finishing 33.5 games behind the first please and eventual league champion Pensacola Pilots. Bill McGhee of Meridian won the league batting championship, hitting.384. Player/manager Bill Hughes was a long-time minor league pitcher, winning 270 games in 20 minor league seasons.

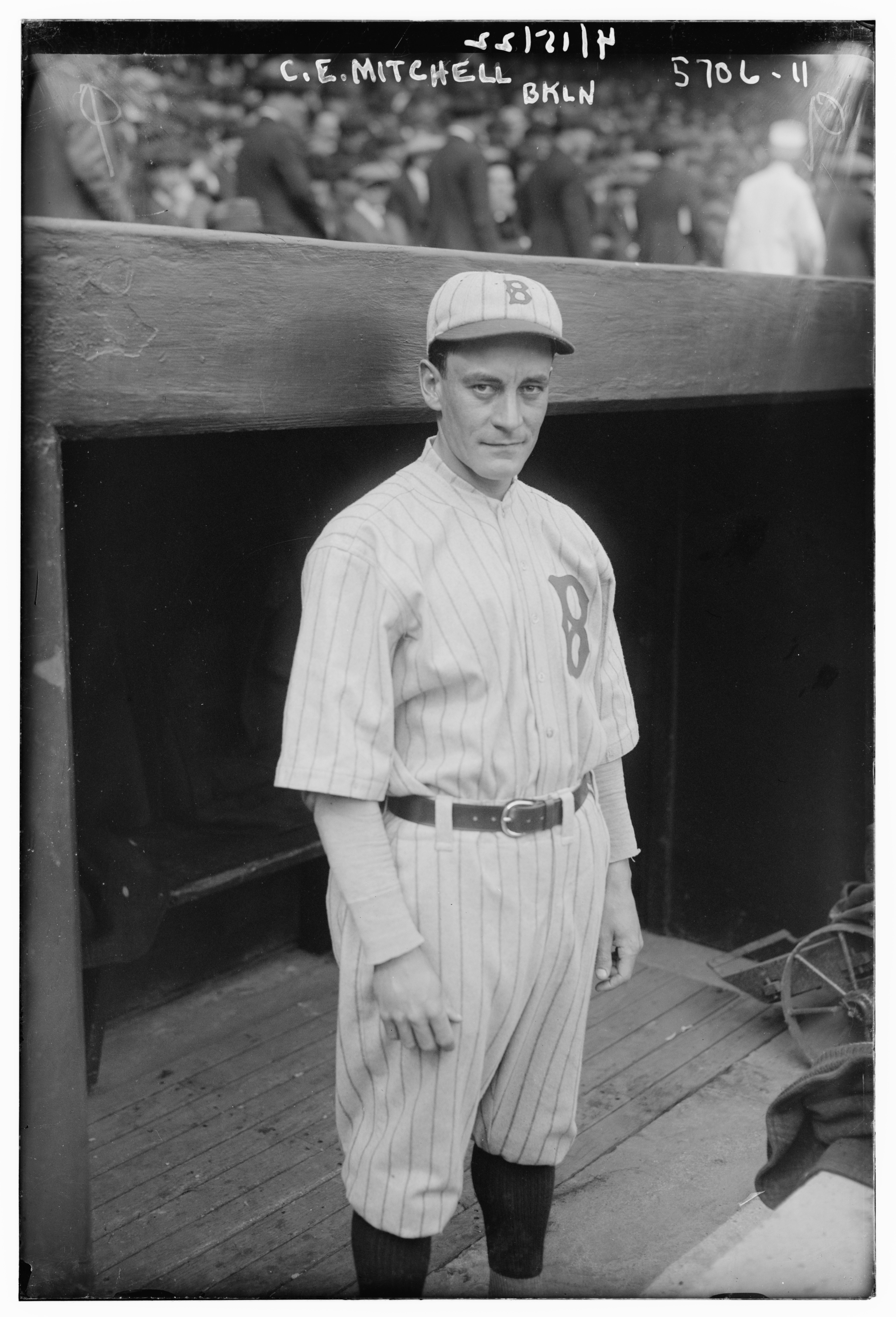
(1922) Clarence Mitchell, Brooklyn Dodgers. Mitchell managed the 1940 Meridian Bears.

In 1940, Clarence Mitchell was hired to manage the Meridian team. Mitchell was a long-time major league pitcher, known as a player who was grandfathered in being able to throw a spitball in the major leagues. Becoming manager of Meridian in 1940, Mitchell made his final appearance as a player during the season, pitching two innings at age 49. Mitchell is noted in baseball history for hitting into a triple play in 1920 World Series for the Brooklyn Dodgers. Cleveland Indians player Bill Wambsganss made the only triple-play in World Series history on Mitchell's batted ball.

The Meridian team became known as the "Bears" in 1940, continuing the season as members of the Southeastern League. The Bears ended the regular season with a final record of 64–80, to finish in seventh place in the eight-team league. Clarence Mitchell and Bernie DeViveiros were the Meriden managers. Meridian did not qualify for the playoffs, finishing 24.5 games behind the first place and eventual league champion Jackson Senators. Pitcher Ewald Pyle of Meridian led the Southeastern League with 180 strikeouts.

As the Southeastern League continued play in the 1941 season, the team became known as Meridian "Eagles," playing as a minor league affiliate of the St. Louis Browns. With fifth-place finish in the eight-team league, the Eagles ended the season with a record 65–74 record. The Eagles were led by manager Bennie Tate and ended the regular season 25.0 games behind the pennant winning Mobile Shippers. Meridian did not qualify for the playoffs won by Mobile, who won eight straight games en route to the championship. Eugene Nance of Meridian won the league batting championship, hitting .386. Teammate Fred Stroble led the league with both 25 home runs and 115 RBI, while Meridian's Jim Russell (baseball) scored a league leading 112 runs.

In June 1942, Ed Wright rejected his move from the Memphis Chicks to the Meridian Eagles. Wright sought to be sent closer to his Dyersburg, Tennessee home where he could continue working as a machinist at a local textile mill while also playing baseball. After rejecting a move to the Hopkinsville Hoppers in Kentucky, Wright returned to Dyersburg until he was sent by Meridian to the Jackson Generals.

In their last season before play was interrupted due to World War II, the Meridian Eagles finished in last place in the 1942 Class B level Southeastern League. The league reduced to six teams, as the Gadsden Pilots and Selma Cloverleafs teams did not return to play following the 1941 season. Meriden ended the 1942 Southeastern League regular season with a final record of 55–89, finishing in sixth place in the six-team league. The Eagles ended the regular season 33.5 games behind the first place Montgomery Rebels in the final standings. Led by managers Rip Fanning and Andy Reese, Meridian did not qualify for the playoffs, won by Montgomery. Eagles player Marion DeJarnett tied for the league lead scoring 111 runs.

Pitcher Bill Reeder played for Meridian in 1942. Following the season, Reeder enlisted in the U.S. Army. As a member of the 381st Infantry Regiment of the 96th Infantry Division, Reeder was in combat at the Battle of Okinawa in 1945. With his unit under attack from Japanese Army mortar fire, Reeder successfully threw hand grenades at the enemy emplacement, stopping the mortar fire. For his military action, Reeder was awarded a Silver Star.

=== 1946 to 1950 – Southeastern League ===
Meridian resumed minor league play in 1946 following World War II, when the Meridien "Peps" team rejoined the Class B level Southeastern League which reformed for the 1946 season with eight teams. The Anniston Rams, Gadsden Pilots, Jackson Senators, Montgomery Rebels, Pensacola Fliers, Selma Cloverleafs and Vicksburg Billies teams joined Meridian in returning to league play beginning on April 12. 1946.

The "Peps" were named by their owner. The team was owned by local Pepsi-Cola bottler Charles Buckwalter, who owned the team through the 1948 season.

Meridian native Fred Williams began the 1945 season with the Cleveland Indians before being sent to the minor leagues. In March 1946, Williams signed with the Meridian Peps to play the upcoming season. During the season, Williams was named as the Meridian manager on July 30, 1946, replacing Walt Tauscher.

Hired before the 1946 season to manage the team, Walt Tauscher was a long-time player and manager in the minor leagues. A pitcher, Tauscher won 263 games in 23 minor league seasons. The 1946 season was the final season in which Tauscher appeared as a player, as he appeared in 8 games for Meridian as pitcher, throwing 19 innings at age 44.

The Meridian "Peps" were a minor league affiliate of the Brooklyn Dodgers in 1946 and finished in last place in the Southeastern League final standings. The Peps finished the regular season with a record of 68–78, to finish in eighth place in the Southeastern League. The managers were [Walt Tauscher and Fred Williams as the Pepe finished 29.5 games behind first place Pensacola. Meridian missed the playoffs won by the Anniston Rams. After having played home games at Fairgrounds Park since beginning Southwestern League play in 1937, the Peps played their final season at the ballpark in 1946.

Following the 1946 season, Meridian team owner Charles Buckwalter reported that the franchise was losing money. The team spent about $5,000 for rent at the Fairgrounds Park in 1946 and Buckwalter pointed out that other teams often had pay only a token fee for the entire year of rent in their ballparks. The owners of the Fairground Field baseball park also would not allow the team to receive revenue on ballpark advertisements, worth an estimated $2,500 annually. With the team in jeopardy of remaining in Meridian, in January 1947, Buckwalter reached an affiliate agreement with the Cleveland Indians and sold shares of 75% the team, retaining 25% of the stocks for himself and he continued as team president. This new revenue funded a new ballpark for the team, with Buckwalter Stadium being built in time for the 1947 season.

Roxie Lawson became the Meridian manager in 1947. In November 1942, Lawson paused his professional baseball career and enlisted in the United States Navy during World War II. After concluding his military service with the Navy, Lawson was hired in January 1947 as the manager of the Meridian Peps for the upcoming season. Former manager Fred Williams returned to Meridian as a player for 1947, with Roxie Lawson taking over for him as manager. Williams played well for Meridian, hitting .321 in 1946 and .300 in 1947, and having 97 and 100 RBI in those seasons.

The 1947 Meridian Peps placed sixth and again did not qualify for the Southeastern League playoffs, with the franchise becoming a minor league affiliate of the Cleveland Indians. The 1947 Meridian Peps finished with a 67–73 regular season record in the eight-team, playing the season under manager Roxy Lawson. Meridian ended the season 10.5 games behind the first place Jackson Generals in the regular season final standings. In the playoffs, the Montgomery Rebels won the league championship. Pitcher Wendell Davis of Meridian won 21 games to lead the league.

After his 1947 season leading Meridian, Roxie Lawson was hired in January 1948 to become the manager of the Green Bay Bluejays of the Wisconsin State League.

On March 26, 1948, former player and manager Fred Williams was released by Meridian.

In 1948, the new Meridian manager to begin the season was Ben Geraghty. Geraghty later became the legendary Hank Aaron's manager with the 1953 Jacksonville Tars. "He was the greatest manager I ever played for, perhaps the greatest manager who ever lived, and that includes managers in the big leagues. I've never played for a guy who could get more out of every ballplayer than he could. He knew how to communicate with everybody and to treat every player as an individual," Hank Aaron said of Geraghty. Aaron also recalled of Geraghty that "he chewed me out when I needed it, but he told me how good I could be and – most important – he taught me how to study the game, and never make the same mistake twice." Future author Pat Jordan, then Aarons teammate on the 1953 Jacksonville Brave, remembered that Geraghty would regularly confront racial segregation that the team encountered. Geraghty would insist that he and his minority players (Aaron, Horace Garner, and Felix Mantilla) be served as equals at the finest restaurants. "Invariably, they would be refused service", Jordan wrote. "While Aaron waited nervously outside, Geraghty complained loudly to the management ... They [would go] to the next best restaurant, and the next and the next, until Geraghty finally located one that would serve [them]."

Two years before joining Meridian, on June 24, 1946, a terrible accident had occurred and Geraghty was one of the survivors of a bus crash that killed nine members of the Spokane Indians team. Geraghty was able to get help to others in the crash. On that date, the Spokane Indians team was en route to play a Western International League game at Bremerton, Washington against the Bremerton Bluejackets. The Spokane team bus was traveling west toward Bremerton and while the bus was crossing the Cascade Mountains on the wet Snoqualmie Pass Highway (then U.S. Route 10), the bus driver swerved to avoid an oncoming car. The Spokane team bus veered off the highway and down a mountainside embankment, crashing and catching fire. With a severe head wound himself, Geraghty was able to climb up the mountainside to reach the road and signal for help.

Nine people were killed in the accident. Six were killed instantly and three later died from their injuries. Seven people were injured. The dead were catcher/manager Mel Cole (age 32), players Bob Kinnaman (28), George Lyden (23), Chris Hartje (31), Fred Martinez (24), Vic Picetti (18), George Risk (25), Bob James (25) and Bob Paterson (23). The injured survivors included players Pete Barisoff, Gus Hallbourg, Dick Powers, Irv Konopka, Levi McCormack, and the bus driver Glen Berg.

With Geraghty as manager to begin the season, the 1948 Meridian Peps played as a Cleveland Indians minor league affiliate. Meridian missed the Southeastern League playoffs again after a sixth-place finish in the eight team Southeastern League. Playing in the Class B league, Meridian finished with a 63–77 record as Ben Geraghty and Jack Maupin managed the team. Playing their final season as the "Peps" Meridian finished 23.5 games behind the first place and eventual league champion Montgomery Rebels.

The Meridian "Millers" advanced to the 1949 Southeastern League playoffs and finished above .500 for the first time. Their playoff appearance was the first for Meridian after nine seasons of missing postseason play. The 1949 Millers finished the Southeastern League regular season as the league runner-up. With an 80–57 record, Meridian placed second in the eight-team league, finishing 16.5 games behind the first place Pensacola Fliers, who are listed as one of the 100 greatest minor league teams of all time. The Millers' manager was again Jack Maupin. In the playoffs, the Vicksburg Billies defeated the Meridian Millers 4 games to 3 and advanced. In the Southeastern League Finals, Pensacola defeated Vicksburg for the championship.

After winning the triple crown while playing for the South Atlantic League member Augusta Tigers team in 1948, Hal Summers signed to play with Meridian in 1949. Meridian manager Jack Maupin had been a classmate and teammate of Summers at San Diego High School. The Millers purchased Summers's contract and he and Maupin were reunited as teammates. Amazingly, Summers the won his second consecutive triple crown playing for Meridian. Summers led the Southeastern League in batting average, hitting .344, (19 points higher than the next player), home runs with 19, and runs batted in with 98. Jack Maupin joined his friend in leading the league with 95 runs scored, while Meridian pitcher Ambrose Palica won 23 games to led the league.

In their final season of Southeastern League play, the 1950 Meridian Millers again placed second in the final regular season standings and advanced to the league finals. Meridian ended the season with a record of 78–52, placing second in the Southeastern League final standings. The Millers finished 2.0 games behind first place Pensacola, under returning manager Jack Maupin. In the first round of the playoffs, the Millers won their first playoff series, defeating Jackson in seven games. Advancing to the finals, Meridian lost to Pensacola 4 games to 1. The Southeastern League folded after the 1950 season, affected by the Korean War.

=== 1952 to 1955 – Cotton States League, two championships ===
After the folding of the Southeastern League following the 1950 season, Meridian did not field a minor league team in the 1951 season. After the 1951 season, the Clarksdale Planters franchise of the Cotton States League relocated to Meridian. The Millers returned the city to the Cotton States League for the first time since 1928.

In 1952, Meridian "Millers" resumed play and became members of the eight-team, Class C level Cotton States League. The El Dorado Oilers, Greenville Bucks, Greenwood Dodgers, Hot Springs Bathers, Monroe Sports, Natchez Indians and Pine Bluff Judges teams joined with Meridian in beginning league play on April 23, 1952.

In their first season of play in their new league, the 1952 Meridian Millers won both the Cotton States League pennant and championship. Meridian ended the regular season with a record of 78–48 to finish in first place, playing their championship season under manager Thomas Davis. The Millers ended the regular season 5.0 games ahead of the second place Natchez Indians in the final standings of the eight-team league. In the first round of the playoffs, the Millers defeated the Monroe Sports 4 games to 2 and advanced. In the finals, the Meridian Millers won the championship by defeating Natchez 4 games to 3. Meridian's Gene Pompelia scored 102 runs to lead the Cotton States League and Meridian pitcher Bob Harrison led the Cotton States League pitchers with both with 24 wins and a 1.82 ERA on the season.

Before the 1953 Cotton States League season began, the league had controversy related to its continued practice of recial segregation. In April 1953, the Cotton States League attempted to evict the Hot Springs Bathers franchise from the league after the Bathers had signed two African-American baseball players, brothers Jim and Leander Tugerson, to their roster for the 1953 season. On April 1, 1953, Mississippi Attorney General J.P. Coleman announced that integrated baseball clubs did not have the right to appear on baseball diamonds in the state of Mississippi. While Coleman acknowledged that there was no specific statute for baseball teams, his edict was based on segregation statutes within the Mississippi constitution. After Coleman's remarks, a Cotton States League meeting was held in secret on April 6, 1953, resulting in a vote to remove the Hot Springs integrated team from the league. There was an immediate reaction to the league's actions against the Hot Springs franchise. Attorney Leslie O'Connor, a former assistant to Commissioner of Baseball Kenesaw Mountain Landis was now a member of the Major-Minor League Executive Council. O'Connor reviewed the ruling and emphasized that the Cotton States League did not act according to their own constitution. O'Connor reviewed that according to the Cotton States League constitution it was provided that any club facing dismissal from the league be afforded with the opportunity to be notified in writing and given an opportunity to reply to any charges before a vote would be taken. This did not happen in the meeting that removed Hot Springs. Rumors also persisted that only five of the teams had voted to expel Hot Springs, which was shy of the two-thirds requirement as noted in the league constitution. National Association President George M. Trautman ordered that Hot Springs remain in the league until he had time to review the matter. Trautman also stated that even if procedures had been followed correctly, if the only reason for the Hot Springs banishment was "the employment of two Negro players, this office would still be required to declare the forfeiture invalid. The employment of Negro players has never been, nor is now, prohibited by any provision of the Major-Minor League Agreement." Before Trautman made a ruling, on April 14, 1953, the Cotton States League owners held another meeting and voted to readmit the Bathers. The Hot Springs franchise remained in the league.

After the league controversy before the 1953 season began, the Meridian Millers defended their championship of the previous season in winning the 1953 Cotton States League title, as the eight-team league played the season intact. The team won the league pennant and were League champions. The Millers ended the regular season with record of 79–46, to finish in first place under returning manager Thomas Davis. Meridian ended the regular season 12.5 games ahead of the second place El Dorado Oilers in the final standings of the eight-team league. In the playoffs Meridian Millers defeated the Jackson Senators 4 games to 2. In the finals, the Meridian Millers swept El Dorado in four games to win their second consecutive Cotton States League championship. Meridian's Hugh Glaze won the league batting title, hitting .355, while teammate Bob Harrison returned to Meridian and led the Cotton Stats League with 19 wins, a 2.15 ERA and 172 strikeouts.

In 1954, the Meridian Millers signed player Carlos "Chico" Heron, playing his first professional season after attending the University of Panama in his home country. Heron went on to hit .325 for Meridian in 1954. Playing the season at age 18, Heron subsequently became the first player of color to sign and play with a minor league team in the state of Mississippi. At the end of the 1954 season, all players of color in the Cotton States League were released by their league teams. After his playing career, Chico Heron became a minor league scout, working for the Philadelphia Phillies, Kansas City Royals, Saint Louis Cardinals, and New York Yankees. Scouting for the Yankees, Heron discovered and mentored Baseball Hall of Fame member Mariano Rivera.

The Meridian Millers continued Cotton states league play as the league was reduced to six teams for the 1954 season, as the Jackson and Natchez teams did not return to league play. The Millers ended the season in third place with a 62–56 record as Thomas Davis returned in the final season of his tenure as manager. Meridian qualified for the playoffs, losing to the El Dorado Oilers 4 games to 3. Pitcher Roy Jayne of Meridian tied for the league lead with 20 wins. The Meridien Millers folded after the 1954 season.

Having folded, the Meridian Millers franchise did not return to play to begin the 1955 Cotton States League season, before returning in the middle of the league's final season. On June 16, 1955, the Pine Bluff Judges moved their franchise to Meridian. The team was a minor league affiliate of the Baltimore Orioles. The Pine Bluff/Meridian team ended the Cotton States League regular season with a 59–56 record and in third place, playing the season under managers Robert Knoke and Merrill Smith in the two locations. The Monroe Sports won the league pennant, finishing 16.0 games ahead of Meridian. In the first round of the four-team playoffs, the Meridian Millers played their final games in losing to the El Dorado Oilers 4 games to 1.

The Cotton States League permanently folded after the 1955 season. Meridian next hosted minor league baseball in 1996, when the "Meridian Brakemen" began a two-season tenure as members of the independent Big South League, playing home games at Scaggs Field.

== The ballparks ==
From 1937 to 1946, Meridian teams played minor league home games at Fairgrounds Park. In the era, the ballpark was located at Donald Avenue and F Street at South 22nd Avenue. After the 1946 season, team owner Charles Buckwalter was losing money on the ballclub because the fair park board charged a sizable rent for the team to play at Fairgrounds Park and a new ballpark was built for the team.

Following the 1947 season, Buckwalter sold 75% of the interest in the club, and raised enough capital to build a ballpark across the street. The new ballpark was named Buckwalter Stadium. Meridian teams hosted home minor league games at Buckwalter Stadium from 1947 to 1955. The ballpark in the era was located at 918 21st Avenue in Meridian, Mississippi. Today, the abandoned grandstands of Buckwalter Stadium still exist.

== Timeline ==
Year(s)	# Yrs.	Team	Level	League	Affiliate	Ballpark
1937–1938	2	Meridian Scrappers	Class B	Southeastern League	St. Louis Browns	Fairgrounds Park
1939	1	Meridian Scrappers	Class B	Southeastern League	None	Fairgrounds Park
1940	1	Meridian Bears	Class B	Southeastern League	None	Fairgrounds Park
1941	1	Meridian Eagles	Class B	Southeastern League	St. Louis Browns	Fairgrounds Park
1942	1	Meridian Eagles	Class B	Southeastern League	None	Fairgrounds Park
1946	1	Meridian Peps	Class B	Southeastern League	Brooklyn Dodgers	Fairgrounds Park
1947–1948	2	Meridian Peps	Class B	Southeastern League	Cleveland Indians	Buckwalter Stadium
1949–1950	2	Meridian Millers	Class B	Southeastern League	None	Buckwalter Stadium
1952–1954	3	Meridian Millers	Class C	Cotton States League	None	Buckwalter Stadium
1955	1	Meridian Millers	Class C	Cotton States League	Baltimore Orioles	Buckwalter Stadium

== Year–by–year records ==
Year	Record	Finish	Manager	Playoffs/Notes
1937	58–78	5th	Leonard McNair / Emmett Lipscomb / Harry Whitehouse	Did not qualify
1938	69–78	5th	Harry Whitehouse	Did not qualify
1939	55–83	8th	Mel Simons / Harry Hughes / Bill Hughes	Did not qualify
1940	64–80	7th	Clarence Mitchell / Bernie DeViveiros	Did not qualify
1941	65–74	5th	Bennie Tate	Did not qualify
1942	55–89	6th	Rip Fanning / Andy Reese	Did not qualify
1946	68–78	8th	Walt Tauscher / Fred Williams	Did not qualify
1947	67–73	6th	Roxie Lawson	Did not qualify
1948	63–77	6th	Ben Geraghty / Jack Maupin	Did not qualify
1949	80–57	2nd	Jack Maupin	Lost in 1st round
1950	78–52	2nd	Jack Maupin	Lost in finals
1952	78–48	1st	Thomas Davis	Won league pennant League champions
1953	79–46	1st	Thomas Davis	Won league pennant League champions
1954	62–56	3rd	Thomas Davis	Lost in 1st round
1955	59–56	3rd	Robert Knoke / Merrill Smith	Pine Bluff moved to Meridian June 16; Lost in 1st round

== Notable alumni ==
- Red Barkley (1937)
- Charlie Biggs (1940)
- Red Borom (1937)
- Bill Burich (1947)
- Tom Cafego (1937)
- Sam Calderone (1946)
- Lindsay Deal (1948)
- Bernie DeViveiros (1940, MGR)
- Grant Dunlap (1947)
- Ben Geraghty (1947, MGR)
- Jimmy Grant (1946)
- Vallie Eaves (1952)
- Bob Ferguson (1949–1950)
- Bob Harrison (1952)
- George Hennessey (1937–1938)
- Jim Henry (1940)
- Sammy Holbrook (1938)
- Bill Hughes (1939, MGR)
- Hooks Iott (1941)
- Harold Knight (1952)
- Joe Kohlman (1941–1942)
- Roxie Lawson (1947, MGR)
- Bill McGhee (1939–1940)
- Art McLean (1939)
- Hack Miller (1940–1941)
- Clarence Mitchell (1940, MGR)
- Anse Moore (1953)
- Charles M. Murphy (1938, 1941)
- Ewald Pyle (1940)
- Bill Reeder (1942)
- Andy Reese (1942, MGR)
- Grover Resinger (1946–1948, 1955)
- Dick Rozek (1947)
- Jim Russell (1941)
- Mel Simons (1939, MGR)
- Lefty Sloat (1946)
- Pete Susko (1939)
- Bennie Tate (1941, MGR)
- Walt Tauscher (1946, MGR)
- Fred Williams (1937–1938; 1946, MGR; 1947)
- Ed Wright (1942)

== See also ==
- Category:Meridian Scrappers players
- Category:Meridian Bears players
- Category:Meridian Eagles players
- Category:Meridian Peps players
- Category:Meridian Millers players
