= Richard Krawczyk =

French footballer (born 1947)

Personal information
- Date of birth: 24 May 1947 (age 79)
- Place of birth: Aix-Noulette, France
- Height: 1.68 m (5 ft 6 in)
- Position: Midfielder

Youth career
- Bully

Senior career*
Years	Team	Apps	(Gls)
1963–1968	Lens		
1968–1970	FC Metz	49	(4)
1970–1976	Reims		
1976–1979	Lens		
- Noeux-les-Mines

International career
1967	France	1	(0)
- * Club domestic league appearances and goals

Richard Krawczyk (born 24 May 1947) is a French retired professional football midfielder.

Krawczyk became the youngest goalscorer in Ligue 1 history in September 1963 by helping Lens beat Angers 2–1.

== Personal life ==
Krawczyk was born in France and is of Polish descent.
