= Bernie DeViveiros =

American baseball player (1901–1994)

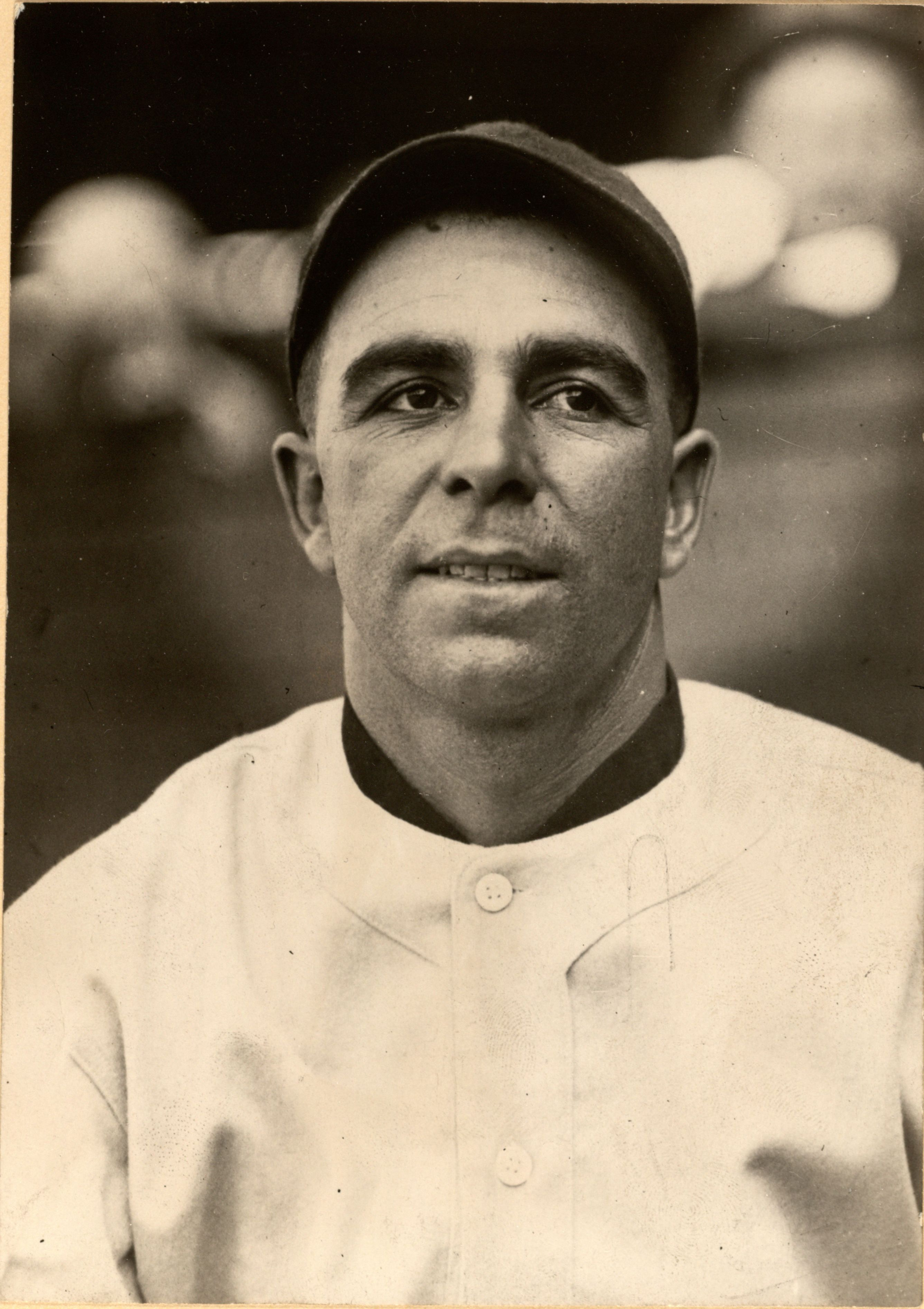
- Shortstop
- Born: April 19, 1901; Oakland, California, U.S.
- Died: July 5, 1994 (aged 93); Oakland, California, U.S.
- Batted: Right Threw: Right

debut
- September 13, 1924, for the Chicago White Sox

Last appearance
- September 14, 1927, for the Detroit Tigers

Career statistics
- Batting average: .217
- Home runs: 0
- Runs batted in: 2
- Stats at Baseball Reference

Teams
- Chicago White Sox (1924); Detroit Tigers (1927)

Bernard John DeViveiros (April 19, 1901 – July 5, 1994) was an American Major League Baseball shortstop who played for the Chicago White Sox in 1924 and the Detroit Tigers in 1927.

In 1951, DeViveiros wrote a section on base running in The Sporting News publication How to Play Baseball."

DeViveiros died on July 5, 1994. He was interred at Mountain View Cemetery in Oakland, California.

== Sources ==
- Lodi News-Sentinel - Apr 15, 1954: Newspaper article citing Bernie's efforts to teach and demonstrate sliding and bunting, which he did for 70 years up and down the West Coast of the United States of America.
- The Spokesman-Review - Feb 9, 1976: Newspaper article citing Bernie's commitment to teaching safe sliding techniques, like the bent-leg slide, and his never-ending fight against players like Darryl Strawberry.
- Portland Tribune - January 31, 2008: Jack Dunn states in this newspaper article that Bernie deViveiros signed Mickey Lolich.
