= Erick Mombaerts =

French football manager (born 1955)

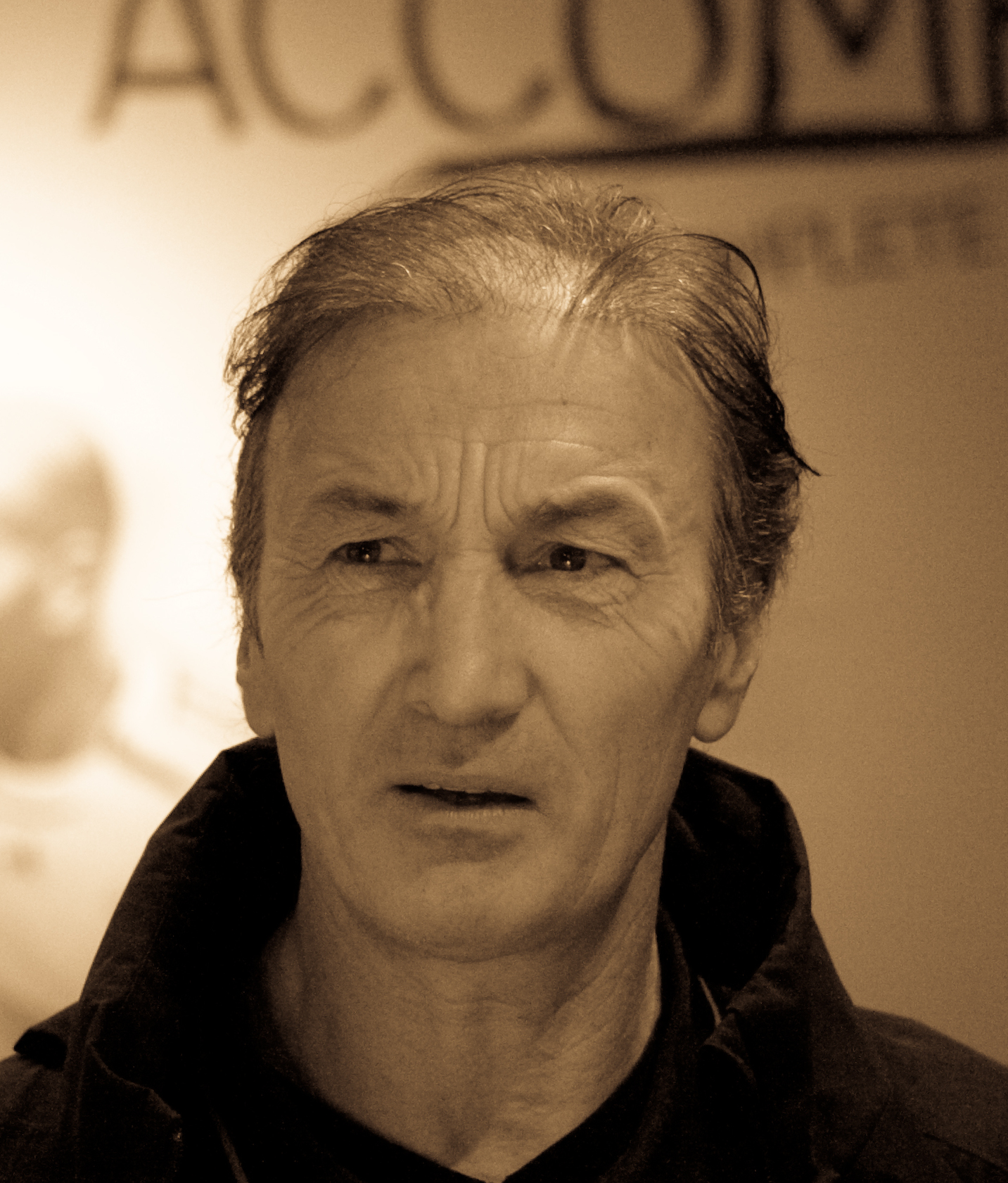
- Mombaerts in 2009

Personal information
- Full name: Erick Émile Jean Marius Mombaerts
- Date of birth: 21 April 1955 (age 71)
- Place of birth: Chantecoq, Loiret, France
- Position: Midfielder

Youth career
- INF Vichy

Senior career*
Years	Team	Apps	(Gls)
1975–1978	Nœux-les-Mines		
1978–1984	Montluçon		

Managerial career
- 1987–1988: Paris Saint-Germain
- 1989–1990: Guingamp
- 1992: Cannes
- 2001–2006: Toulouse
- 2007–2008: France U18
- 2008–2012: France U21
- 2012–2014: Le Havre
- 2015–2018: Yokohama F. Marinos
- 2019–2020: Melbourne City
- * Club domestic league appearances and goals

Erick Émile Jean Marius Mombaerts (born 21 April 1955) is a French football manager and former player.

== Playing career ==
Mombaerts is a youth product of INF Vichy. He went on to play for Nœux-les-Mines and Montluçon before retiring in 1984.

== Coaching career ==
Mombaerts began his coaching career with Paris Saint-Germain, taking charge between October 1987 and February 1988. Mombaerts was manager of Guingamp during the 1989–90 season. He then managed Cannes between January 1992 and December 1992, and Toulouse from 2001 to 2006. While with Toulouse he won the Ligue 2 championship in 2003.

After coaching their under-18 team, Mombaerts became manager of the French under-21 team in April 2008. He left that position in October 2012.

Mombaerts became manager at Le Havre in December 2012. He resigned in December 2014.

He was appointed as the head coach of Japanese club Yokohama F. Marinos in December 2014.

Mombaerts stepped down as head coach of the Marinos at the succession of the 2017 Emperor's Cup, on 1 January 2018.

Mombaerts was appointed manager of Melbourne City on 27 June 2019. On 3 September 2020, he stood down from the coaching role at City to return to France, handing the coaching reins over to his assistant Patrick Kisnorbo.

== Managerial statistics ==
As of 10 May 2022

Team	Nat	From	To	Record				
Team	Nat	From	To	G	W	D	L	Win %
Paris Saint-Germain	(France)	October 1987	February 1988	20	6	8	6	30.00
Toulouse	(France)	2001	2006	167	59	42	66	35.33
France U21	(France)	29 April 2008	18 October 2012	43	27	8	8	62.79
Le Havre	(France)	21 December 2012	10 December 2014	79	29	25	25	36.71
Yokohama F. Marinos	(Japan)	14 December 2014	31 December 2017	138	65	34	39	47.10
Melbourne City FC	(Australia)	27 June 2019	3 September 2020	33	19	5	9	57.58
Total				480	205	122	153	42.71
