= Bill Hughes (pitcher) =

American baseball player (1896–1963)

- Pitcher
- Born: November 18, 1896; Philadelphia, Pennsylvania, U.S.
- Died: February 25, 1963 (aged 66); Birmingham, Alabama, U.S.
- Batted: Right Threw: Right

MLB debut
- September 15, 1921, for the Pittsburgh Pirates

Last MLB appearance
- September 15, 1921, for the Pittsburgh Pirates

MLB statistics
- Win–loss record: 0–0
- Earned run average: 4.50
- Strikeouts: 2
- Stats at Baseball Reference

Teams
- Pittsburgh Pirates (1921)

Bill Hughes (November 18, 1896 – February 25, 1963) was an American baseball player for the Pittsburgh Pirates in 1921. He was a pitcher. He was born on November 18, 1896, in Philadelphia, Pennsylvania, and he died on February 25, 1963, in Birmingham, Alabama. He weighed 155 lbs when playing baseball.

Hughes pitched in 20 minor league baseball seasons for 11 teams, winning 302 minor league games.
