= Big South League =

Defunct American baseball league

The Big South League was an independent baseball league that operated from 1996 to 1997 in the states of Arkansas, Mississippi and Tennessee. The BSL sought to establish baseball clubs in a number of rapidly expanding urban areas without professional sports entertainment. The circuit featured six franchises represented on its inaugural season. At the time, none of the cities represented had hosted professional baseball for 40 years.

In its second season, the three teams from Tennessee left the BSL to join the Heartland League, while the team from Arkansas did not return. New teams from Mississippi and Tennessee joined the league to complete a four-team circuit, but the BSL failed when attendance fell drastically, from over 200,000 to under 100,000, and folded at the end of the season.

== List of teams ==
- Clarksville Coyotes, Clarksville, TN (1996)
- Columbia Mules, Columbia, TN (1996)
- Greenville Bluesmen, Greenville, MS (1996–1997)
- Meridian Brakemen. Meridian, MS (1996–1997)
- Pine Bluff Locomotives, Pine Bluff, AR (1996)
- Tennessee Tomahawks, Winchester, TN, Tullahoma, TN (1996)
- Tennessee Walkers, Tullahoma, TN (1997)
- Tupelo Tornado, Tupelo, MS (1997)

== Championships ==
- Greenville Bluesmen (1996–1997)

== Sources ==
- Stott, Jon C. (2001) Leagues of Their Own: Independent Professional Baseball, 1993-1999. McFarland & Company. ISBN 978-0-786-41130-6
- Big South League (Independent) Encyclopedia and History. Baseball Reference. Retrieved on April 10, 2016.
