= Anniston Moulders =

- 1913–1917; (1904, 1911–1917); Anniston, Alabama

Minor league affiliations
- Class: Independent (1904); Class D (1911–1917)
- League: Tennessee–Alabama League (1904); Southeastern League (1911–1912); Georgia–Alabama League (1913–1917)

Major league affiliations
- Team: None

Minor league titles
- League titles (2): 1911; 1917

Team data
- Name: Anniston (1904); Anniston Models (1911–1912); Anniston Moulders (1913–1917)
- Ballpark: 14th Street Park (1904, 1911–1917)

The Anniston Moulders were a minor league baseball team based in Anniston, Alabama. From 1913 to 1917, the "Moulders" played as members of the Class D level Georgia–Alabama League. The team was immediately preceded by the 1911 and 1912 Anniston "Models," who played as members of the Class D level Southeastern League and the 1904 Anniston team of the independent Tennessee–Alabama League. Anniston won league championships in 1911 and 1917.

Baseball Hall of Fame charter member Ty Cobb played for Anniston in 1904, in his first professional season. Today, there are historical plaques in Anniston commemorating his season of play in the city.

The Anniston teams hosted home minor league games at the 14th Street Park, known today as Zinn Park.

== History ==
=== Early Anniston baseball ===
Anniston first hosted semi–professional teams as early as 1892. In 1892, the Anniston team played a team from Atlanta, Georgia, winning by the score of 3–0 at Atlanta.

Anniston was first named in minor league baseball when the 1903 Anniston "Invincibles" were one of four members of the independent Alabama–Georgia League. Official league records, standings and statistics for the 1903 league are unknown. On August 28, 1903, the Invincibles had a record of 42–11 as reported in the local newspaper. The 1903 Anniston roster was said to have been composed of college players who were housed with host families. "All the players were prefect gentlemen, during their stay not one of them was seen to enter a barroom," the Anniston Star reported. The team disbanded on August 15, 1903, due to not being challenged within their league. The local paper noted that "the boys will all return to college in September. The people of Anniston wish for them a successful year."

Tom Stouch is cited as with being the first Anniston manager. Stouch is credited with discovering Shoeless Joe Jackson in 1907 and launching his professional career. Stouch discovered Jackson while playing an exhibition game against the Jackson's mill team in Greer, South Carolina. Stouch signed Jackson after becoming manager of the Greenville Spinners of the North Carolina State League in 1908. Stouch signed Jackson for $75 a month, which was an increase over what Jackson made playing in the mill leagues. When the Philadelphia Athletics of the American League offered Greenville $900 for his contract, Stouch convinced Jackson who originally hesitated to play for the Athletics.

=== 1904 – Tennessee–Alabama League and Ty Cobb ===
The 1904 "Anniston" team played a portion of the season as members of the eight-team independent Tennessee–Alabama League and had a legendary charter member of the Baseball Hall of Fame on their roster. The Anniston team was owned and managed by Lindsay Scarborough after Tom Stouch became manager of another team in the league. The Anniston team folded from the league on July 9, 1912, along with the Bessemer team. At the time they folded, the Anniston team had a record of 19–29, playing their shortened season under managers George Grove and Lindsay Scarborough. The Decatur team eventually won the league championship with a record of 52–31 and were managed by Tom Stouch. The Tennessee–Alabama League folded following their one season of play and never reformed.

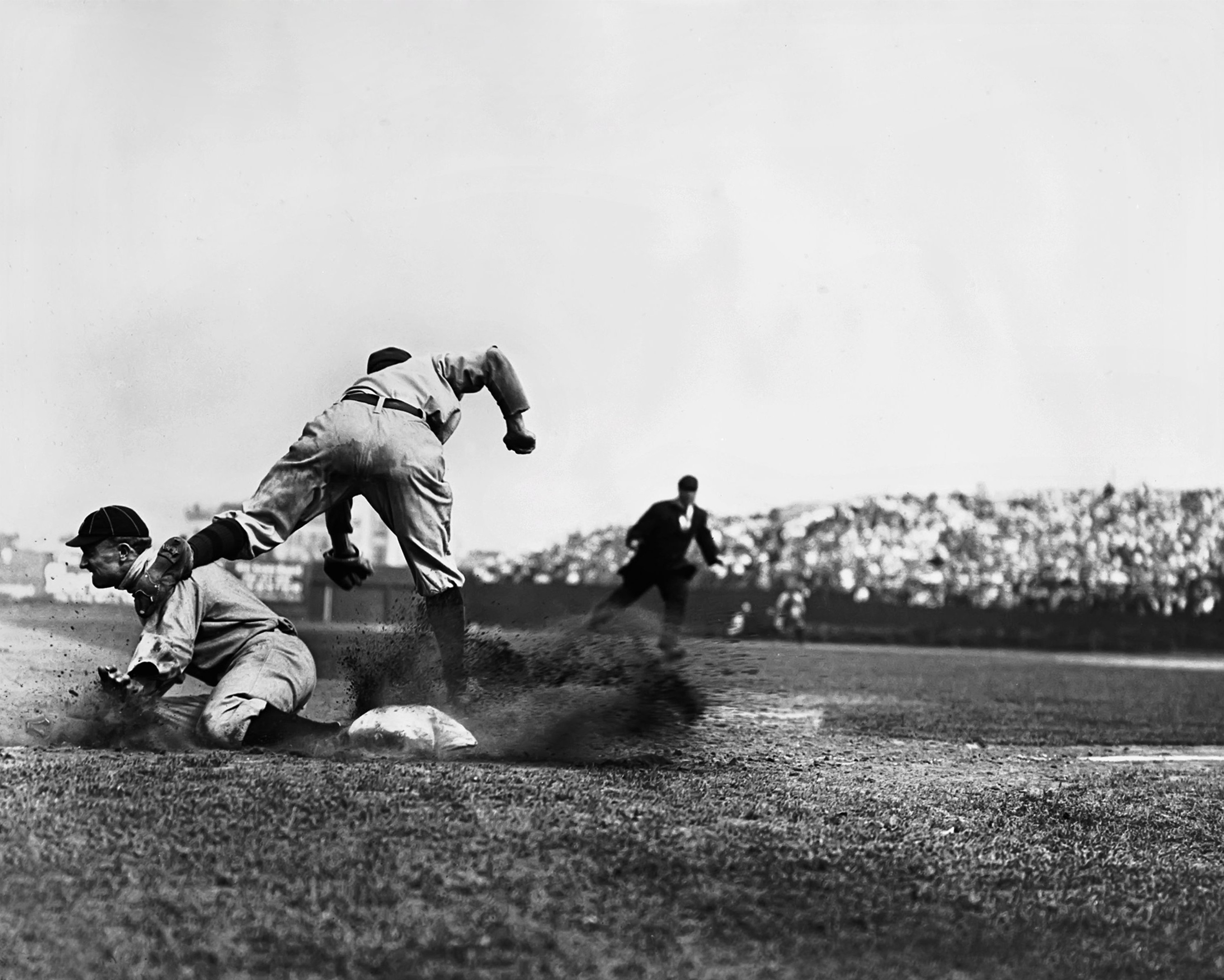
(1909) Ty Cobb, Detroit Tigers stealing third base against Jimmy Austin and the New York Highlanders. Photograph by Charles M. Conlon.

Ty Cobb began the 1904 season with the Class C level Augusta Tourists of the South Atlantic League. Augusta released Cobb after playing the first two games of his first professional season, having signed a contract for $50.00 per month with Augusta. Cobb then was offered a contract by Anniston. He sought the advice of his father William Herschel Cobb, a schoolteacher, who told him "Go for it. And I want to tell you one other thing — don’t come home a failure." Cobb then played most of the season with Anniston before he returned to play for Augusta to conclude the 1904 season after Anniston had folded. Cobb had been released from Augusta along with pitcher, Thad Hayes, who was a friend of the Anniston team owner and manager, L.L. Scarbrough. Hayes was invited to play in Anniston, and knew the team was also looking for an outfielder. He persuaded Cobb to go with him to Anniston and Cobb was signed by Scarborough to a contract for $65 per month plus room and board.

On June 22, 1904, Anniston was in sixth place in the league standings with a 14–15 record. On that date, Cobb batted leadoff for Anniston and went 1-5 with a triple while playing centerfield in a 9–1 loss for Anniston at home. 200 were in attendance for the game, which was played in 75 minutes.

Cobb hit .370 for Anniston with 6 stolen bases in 22 documented Anniston games.

While playing for Anniston, Cobb engaged in self-promotion, sending several postcards written about his performances under different aliases to Grantland Rice, who was the sports editor of Atlanta Journal at the time. Rice eventually wrote a short piece on Cobb in the Journal that a "young fellow named Cobb seems to be showing an unusual lot of talent."

In 1905, Cobb made his major league debut with the Detroit Tigers and also had personal tragedy. On the evening of August 8, 1905, Cobbs' father had suspected his mother Amanda Cobb of infidelity, and after leaving, secretly returned to their home in with a pistol. Shortly after midnight William Cobb climbed onto the porch roof and approached the bedroom window. With the course of events unknown, his mother Cobb shot William Cobb twice, killing him. Amanda Cobb claimed to have mistaken her husband for a burglar, but a coroner’s inquest led to her arrest on the charge of manslaughter. A grand jury was formed and indicted her. Amanda Cobb was acquitted at trial in March 1906. Cobb later said of his father, "My father was the greatest man I ever knew. He was a scholar, state senator, editor, and philosopher. I worshiped him."

Today, a historical marker in Anniston, Alabama is placed at the former site of Cobb's residence, which was a boarding house. The marker was erected in 2009. The marker is located on the corner of 10th Street and Quintard Avenue in Anniston. The plaque refers to the team as the Anniston "Steelers." Cobb's residence was The Baker boarding house, which was located at 1010 Quintard Avenue, where Cobb lived with teammate Edwin Darden. The site today is commercial property. Cobb would walk to the ballpark in Anniston on game days with local boys, giving them his shoes to carry to the ballpark. Upon arrival, he would have the children admitted into the ballpark.

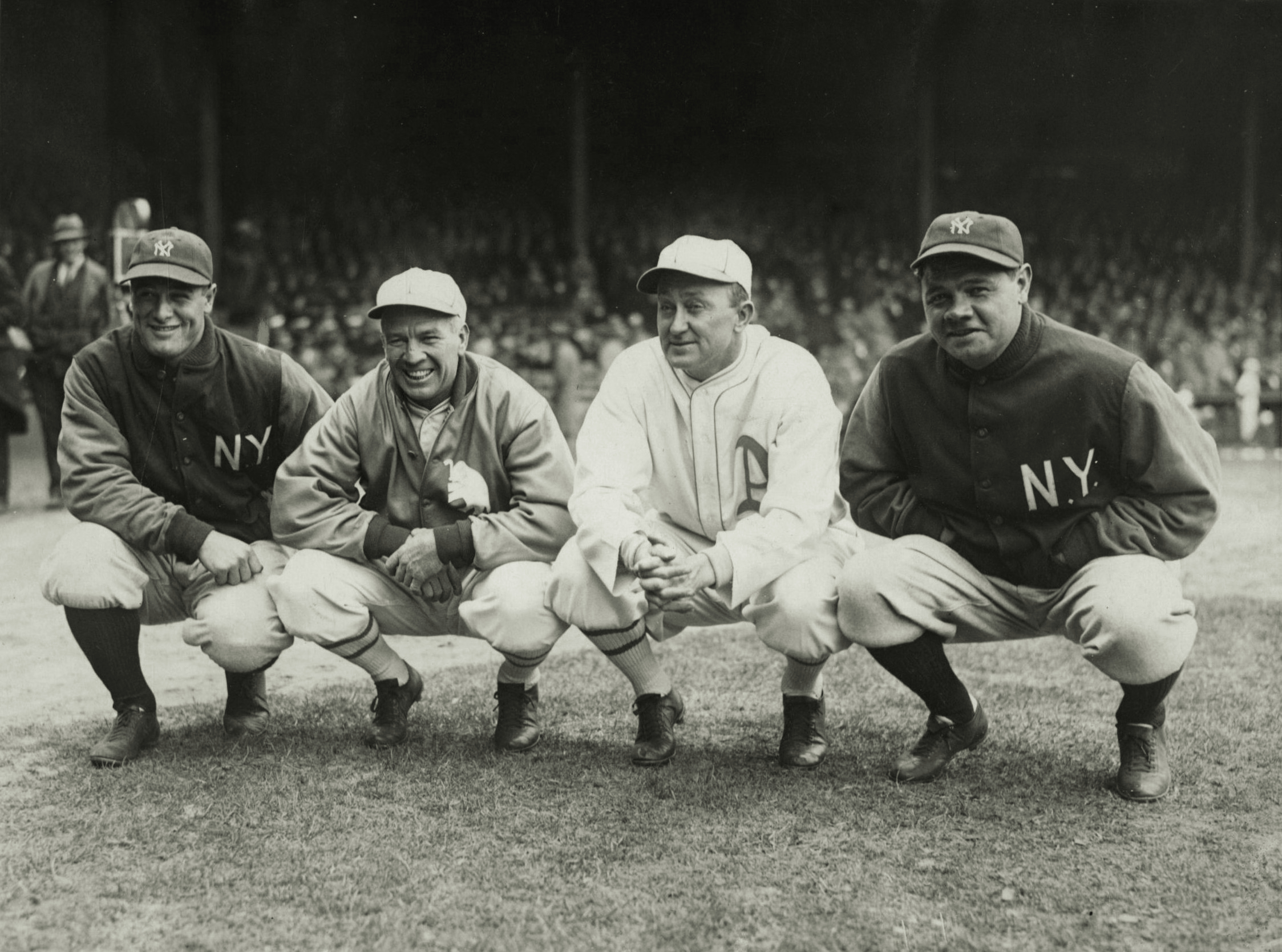
(April 1928) Baseball Hall of Fame members Lou Gehrig, Tris Speaker, Ty Cobb and Babe Ruth.

At the Ty Cobb Museum in his hometown in Royston, Georgia, a scorebook is preserved from Cobb's 1904 season with Anniston. It refers to the team as the "Noblemen" and contains the scorebooks of the 1904 Anniston season. The scorebook has been on display in several public events. The first game recorded in the book took place in Anniston on May 16, 1904, which was the opening day game between the Anniston Noblemen and the Bessemer Marvels. The scorebook shows that Ty Cobb played left field in the game and batted fifth in the batting order, going 1-4 at the plate and committing an error while playing left field.

Retiring as a player in 1928, Ty Cobb became a charter member of the Baseball Hall of Fame in 1936. Cobb joined Walter Johnson, Christy Mathewson, Babe Ruth and Honus Wagner as the first players to be inducted into the hall of fame. Cobb has the major league record for the highest lifetime batting average, .367, and is second in runs scored with 2,245, being passed by Ricky Henderson. Cobb is also second in career hits with 4,191 and triples with 297. Cobb is third with 897 career stolen bases. His 275 career assists as a centerfielder remain second in baseball history.

=== 1911 to 1912 – Southeastern League ===
In 1911, Anniston resumed minor league play when the Anniston "Models" team was formed and became members of the six-team Class D level Southeastern League. Anniston won the league championship. In 1911, the Gadsden Steel Makers and Rome Romans teams were the only two teams returning to the league, as four new franchises were added. Gadson and Rome were joined by the Anniston Models, Decatur Twins, Huntsville Westerns and Selma Centralites teams in the six-team league, which began play on May 8, 1911.

Anniston use of the "Models" nickname corresponds to local history. Anniston was nicknamed "The Model City" by Atlanta newspaperman Henry W. Grady due to the careful planning of the early city.

Clarence "Pop-Boy" Smith had grown up in Birmingham, Alabama and was often in attendance at Birmingham Barons minor league games as a youth. Smith soon was selling sodas and peanuts at the ballpark, working as a vendor. He eventually was allowed to shag flyballs during batting practice and in 1910, began to pitch batting practice for the Barons team. Barons catcher Rowdy Elliott recommended that Smith be signed to a contract in a low-level league and Barons manager Carlton Molesworth agreed. The Barons signed Smith and had him report to Anniston for the 1911 season.

On May 10, 1911, Smith made his debut for Anniston, striking out 10 in a game against Selma. During the 1911 season for Anniston, Smith pitched both games of seven double headers at age 19.

The 1911 Anniston Models won the Southeastern League championship. With a record of 68-38, Anniston placed first out of the six teams, playing under managers Walter Ford and Thomas Fisher. First place Anniston finished 3½ games ahead of second place Gadsen in the final standings of the Southeastern League, which held no playoffs Pitcher Clarence "Pop-Boy" Smith of Anniston won 24 games to lead the league and his 248 strikeouts were also the most in the league. Teammate Sam Nelson has a 12-4 record, to have the best winning percentage in the league.

The 1912 Anniston Models continued play as members of the Southeastern League, but the league folded before the end of the regular season. The league began play on April 5, 1912. After beginning the second half of the split-season schedule on July 22 after Anniston folded, the league disbanded August 2, 1912. The league folded with the following official second half standings: Gadsden (7-4), Talladega Highlanders (5-5), Selma (5-6), and Rome (5-7). Anniston ended the 1912 season with an overall record of 41–35, finishing in third place, as Thomas Fisher returned as manager. The Models ended the season 2.0 games behind first place Gadsden. in the shortened season.

=== 1913 to 1917 Georgia–Alabama League ===
Following the folding of the Southeastern League, 1913 Anniston "Moulders" began play as charter members of the newly formed, six–team, Class D level Georgia–Alabama League. The Gadsden Steel Makers, LaGrange Terrapins, Newnan Cowetas, Opelika Opelicans and Talladega Indians teams joined with the Annison Moulders in beginning league play on May 5, 1913.

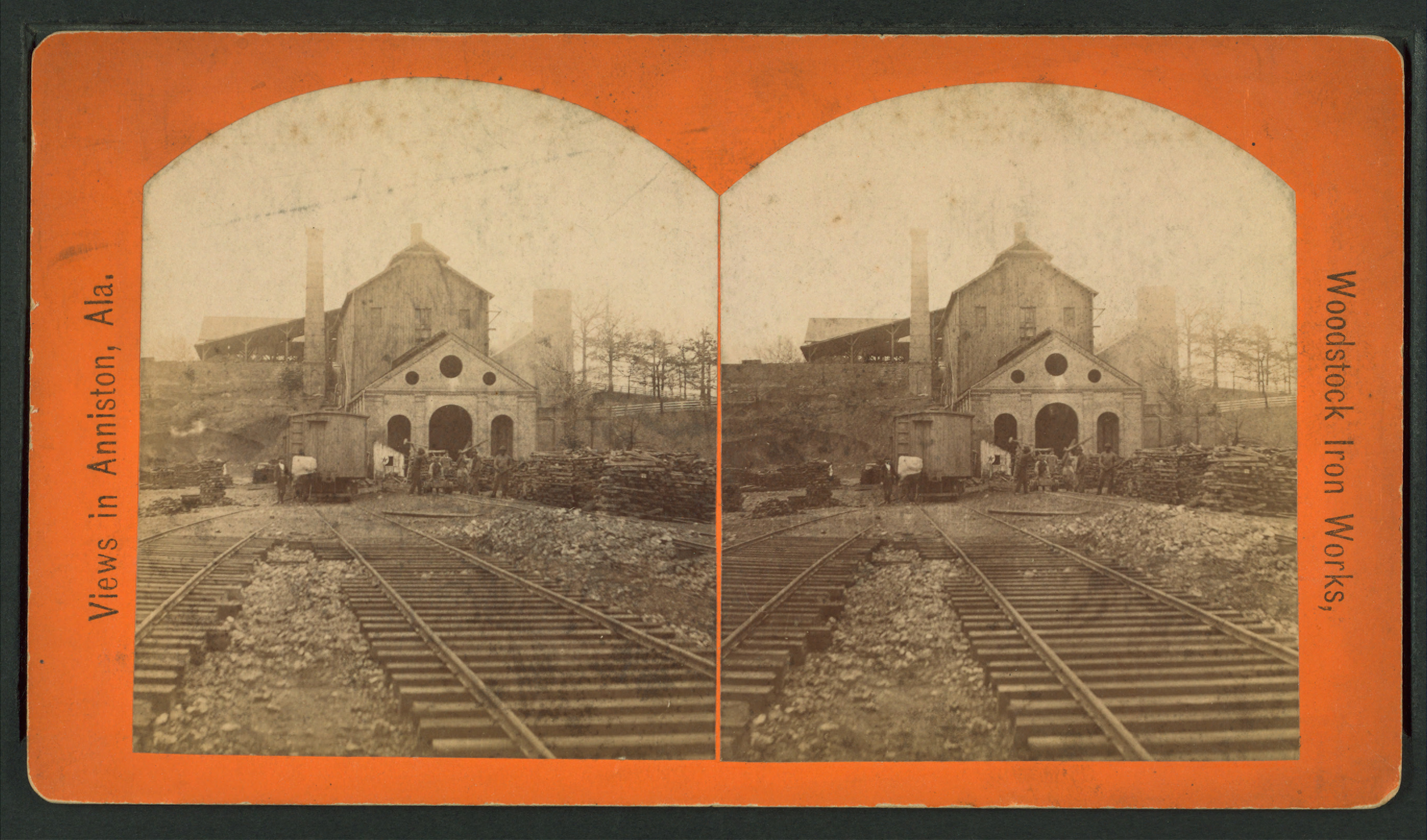
(1910) The furnace of Woodstock Iron Company. Anniston, Georgia.

The Anniston "Moulders' nickname corresponds to local history and industry. In April 1872, the Woodstock Iron Company was founded in Anniston by Samuel Noble. The molding process and Metal injection molding were used to produce iron and iron products.

Emile "Chick" Hannon became the Anniston manager for the 1913 season. Hannon had been a football and baseball player at the University of Alabama and had subsequently served in the U.S. Army, stationed in France until his discharge as a second lieutenant. Hannon had moved to Anniston following his college graduation. When hired as the Anniston manager, Hannon was an assistant coach at the University of Alabama football and baseball teams. Hannon played quarterback for Alabama during his football career.

The Anniston Moulders placed fourth in the 1913 Georgia–Alabama League final standings. Anniston Moulders ended the 1913 season with a record of 45–45 as Chick Hannon served as manager. The Anniston Moulders finished 16½ games behind the first place Gadsden team in the final standings, as the league held no playoffs.

Samuel Gardner played for the Moulders in the 1913 and 1914 seasons, making the team as a pitcher. Gardner was the older brother of Riggs Stephenson, teaching Stephenson how to play baseball and introducing him to the team. A member of the Chicago Cubs Hall of Fame, Stephenson grew to advance to the major leagues and compiled a .336 lifetime batting average in fourteen seasons.

On July 4, 1914, Anniston pitcher Whitey Glazner came into the game in relief in the top of the third inning with the game tied 5-5 tie and proceeded to pitch seven innings, allowing only one-run in his relief appearance. In the bottom of the fifth, Glazner hit a two-run homer to put Anniston up 7-6 en route to a 10-6 victory. After the home run with 1,300 in attendance at Anniston, the fans threw nickels, dimes, and quarters onto the field, giving Glazner "a purse of $29.32."

The Anniston Moulders continued play in 1914, as members of the eight-team Class D level Georgia–Alabama League. The league expanded from six teams to eight teams. The Anniston Moulders, Gadsden Steel Makers, LaGrange Terrapins, Newnan Cowetas, Opelika Opelicans and Talladega Indians were the returning member teams and joined with the expansion Rome Romans and Selma River Rats in beginning league Georgia–Alabama League play on May 8, 1914.

The Anniston Moulders placed fifth in the final standings as the Georgia–Alabama League expanded from six teams to eight teams for the 1914 season. The Moulders ended the 1914 season with a record of 41–54, to finish in sixth place out of the eight teams. Playing the season under managers Bob Ragsdale and Leslie Proctor, Anniston finished 19.0 games behind the first place Selma River Rats in the final standings.

The 1915 Alabama–Georgia League reduced to six teams and played a shortened season, ending play on July 14, 1915. The Newnan Cowetas team was in first place when the season ended and the Anniston Moulders placed fifth in the final league standings. The Anniston Moulders ended their shortened 1915 season with a record of 22–38, placing fifth out of the six league teams. Jack Steele managed the Anniston team in 1915. Anniston ended the season 17½ games behind first place Newnan in the final standings. Pitcher Whitey Glazner of Anniston led the Alabama–Georgia League with 101 strikeouts. Included in Glazner's season was a 14-inning shutout on May 30, 1915. Glazner continued the 1915 season with the Winston-Salem Twins of the North Carolina State League after the Alabama–Georgia League ended their shortened season.

Despite folding during the season before, the Georgia–Alabama League reformed in 1916, playing a planned shortened season. The Rome Romans captured the league championship, with the Anniston Moulders finishing in fifth place. The league folded on July 22, 1916, with Rome in first place in the league standings. Playing the season under manager Wade Reynolds, the Anniston Moulders ended the season with a record of 23–39, finishing 13.5 games behind the first place Rome Romans in the final standings, as the Georgia–Alabama League ended play early as scheduled on July 22.

Despite playing a shortened season in 1916, the Georgia–Alabama League continued play in 1917. The Anniston Moulders continued play in the six-team league and won the league championship in a brief season. On May 23, 1917, the Georgia-Alabama League folded. In the brief season, the Anniston Moulders finished with a record of 13–5 to place first in the final standings when the league stopped play. Playing the brief season under manager Bill Pierre, the Moulders finished 1.5 games ahead of the second place Griffin team in the final standings. The Georgia–Alabama League folded following the 1917 season. The Georgia–Alabama League did not return to play in 1918 and there were only ten total minor leagues that played the season in 1918 due to World War I.

In 1917, at the start of World War I, the United States Army established a training camp at Fort McClellan in Anniston.

Anniston, Alabama next hosted a minor league team when the 1928 Anniston Nobles began a three-season tenure of play returning as members of the reformed Georgia-Alabama League.

== The ballpark ==
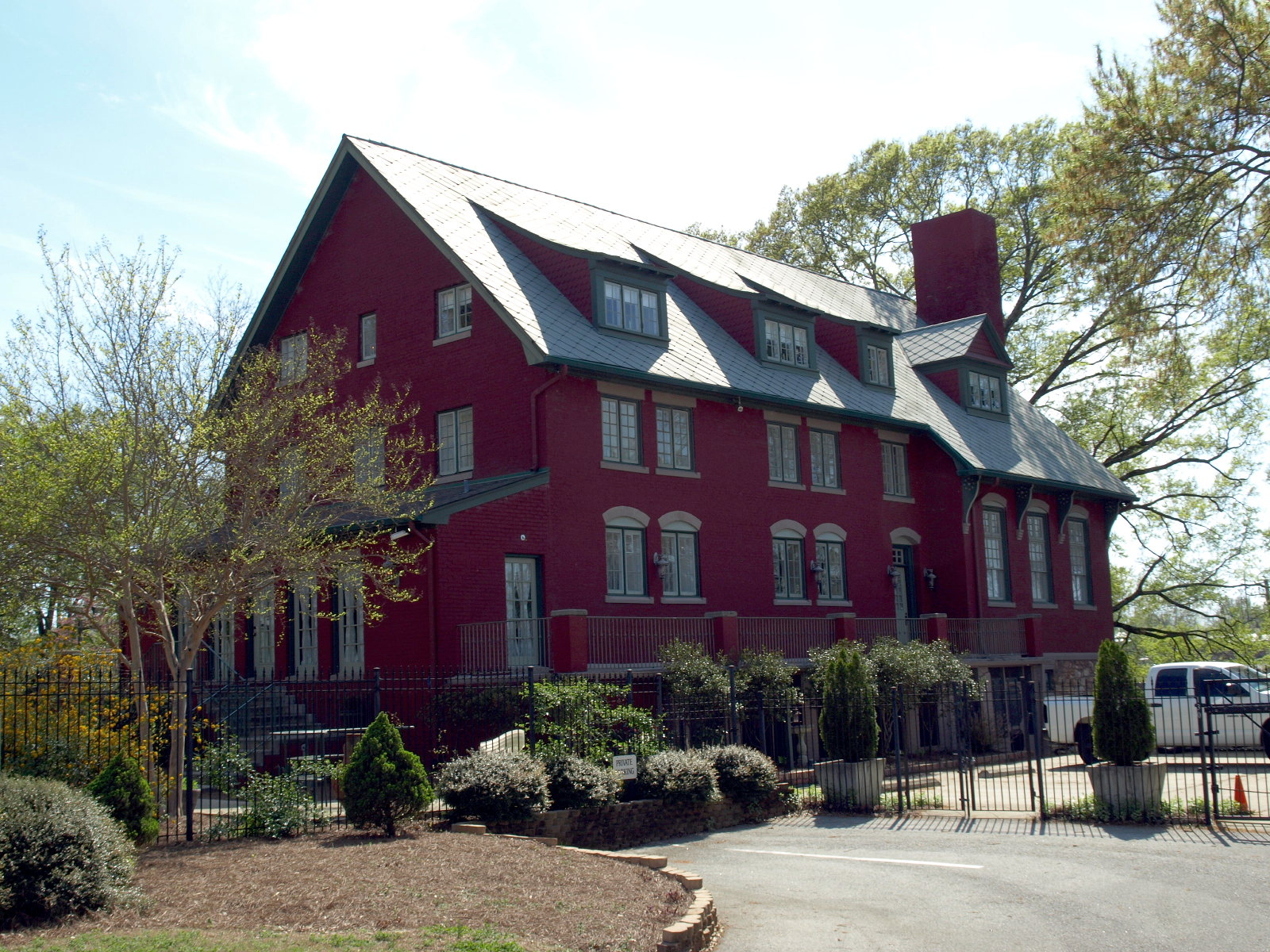
(2014) Anniston Inn Kitchen National Register of Historic Places. Anniston, Alabama.

In 1904, Anniston with Ty Cobb on the roster began minor league play at a ballpark labeled "Base Ball Park" the 1900 insurance map from the era. Called the 14th street Park, the site was bordered by 14th Street, Gurnee, 13th Street and Monroe. First hosting military events and football on the site as early as 1895, the ballpark was built on the parcel, which was located directly across the street from the Anniston College building and the Old Anniston Hotel. The ballpark continued to be used through the 1917 season by Anniston minor league teams. The ballpark had a wooden grandstand that was rebuilt after fire damage on multiple occasions. In 1924, the City Park Commission constructed Zinn Park on the site. When it opened, the new park featured tennis courts, a swimming pool and other amenities. The Anniston College facility became the Anniston Inn before fire destroyed all of the facility but the Anniston Inn Kitchen portion of the building. Today, the Anniston police station is located on the site across the street.

Still in use as a public park today, Zinn Park is located at 101 West 14th Street in Anniston, Alabama.

== Timeline ==
Year(s)	# Yrs.	Team	Level	League	Ballpark
1903	1	Anniston Invincibles	Independent	Alabama–Georgia League	14th Street ballpark
1904	1	Anniston	Independent	Tennessee–Alabama League	14th Street ballpark
1911-1912	2	Anniston Models	Class D	Southeastern League	14th Street ballpark
1913-1917	4	Anniston Moulders	Class D	Georgia–Alabama League	14th Street ballpark

== Year–by–year records ==
Year	Record	Finish	Manager	Playoffs/Notes
1904	19–29	NA	George Grove / Lindsay Scarborough	Team folded July 9
1911	68–38	1st	Walter Ford / Thomas Fisher	League champions League folded August 2
1912	41–35	3rd	Thomas Fisher	Team folded July 22; League folded August 2
1913	46–45	4th	Chick Hannon	No playoffs held
1914	41–54	6th	Bob Ragsdale / Louis Procter	No playoffs held
1915	22–38	5th	Jack Steele	League folded July 14
1916	23–39	5th	Wade Reynolds	League folded July 22
1917	13–5	1st	Bill Pierre	League champions League folded May 23

== Notable alumni ==
- Ty Cobb (1904) Inducted Baseball Hall of Fame, 1936
- Lloyd Christenbury (1916–1917)
- Whitey Glazner (1913–1915)
- Guy Lacy (1916–1917)
- Johnny Morrison (1916–1917)
- Pop-Boy Smith (1911)
- Tom Stouch (1903, MGR)
- Tully Sparks (1903)
- Anniston Models players
- Anniston Moulders players
