= Knoxville Smokies =

Minor league baseball team in Tennessee, US

- Founded in 1921; Knoxville, Tennessee
Team logo
Cap insignia

Minor league affiliations
- Class: Double-A (1963–present)
- Previous classes: Class A (1956–1962); Class B (1954); Class D (1953); Class B (1946–1952); Class A1 (1936–1944); Class A (1931–1935); Class B (1925–1929); Class D (1921–1924)
- League: Southern League (1964–present)
- Division: North Division
- Previous leagues: South Atlantic League (1956–1963); Tri-State League (1954); Mountain States League (1953); Tri-State League (1946–1952); Southern Association (1931–1944); South Atlantic League (1925–1929); Appalachian League (1921–1924)

Major league affiliations
- Team: Chicago Cubs (2007–present)
- Previous teams: Arizona Diamondbacks (2005–2006); St. Louis Cardinals (2003–2004); Toronto Blue Jays (1980–2002); Chicago White Sox (1972–1979); Cincinnati Reds (1965–1967); Detroit Tigers (1959–1964); Baltimore Orioles (1956–1958); New York Giants (1940, 1948–1952); Brooklyn Dodgers (1937, 1941); Pittsburgh Pirates (1938–1939); Boston Bees (1936)

Minor league titles
- League titles (4): 1974; 1978; 2004; 2023
- Division titles (10): 1974; 1978; 1984; 1993; 2004; 2009; 2010; 2011; 2022; 2023
- First-half titles (9): 1978; 1982; 1984; 1997; 1999; 2004; 2010; 2011; 2026
- Second-half titles (11): 1978; 1985; 1986; 1991; 1993; 1998; 2009; 2010; 2013; 2023; 2024

Team data
- Name: Knoxville Smokies (2025–present)
- Previous names: Tennessee Smokies (2000–2024); Knoxville Smokies (1993–1999); Knoxville Blue Jays (1980–1992); Knoxville Sox (1972–1979); Knoxville Smokies (1925–1967); Knoxville Pioneers (1921–1924)
- Colors: Royal blue, light blue, red, gold, white
- Mascots: Knox, Jackson, Smokie Joe
- Ballpark: Covenant Health Park (2025–present)
- Previous parks: Smokies Stadium (2000–2024); Bill Meyer Stadium (1957–1967, 1972–1999); Municipal Stadium (1954, 1956–1957); Chapman Hwy. Park (1953); Smithson Stadium (1931–1943, 1946–1952); Caswell Park (1921–1929)
- Owner/ Operator: Boyd Sports
- General manager: Tim Volk
- Manager: Lance Rymel
- Media: MiLB.TV and WKCE
- Website: milb.com/knoxville

The Knoxville Smokies are a Minor League Baseball team based in Knoxville, Tennessee. The team, which plays in the Southern League, is the Double-A affiliate of the Chicago Cubs. The team was based in Kodak, Tennessee, a Knoxville suburb, from 2000 to 2024 as the Tennessee Smokies at Smokies Stadium. The team moved into Covenant Health Park in Knoxville in 2025. The team's nickname refers to the Great Smoky Mountains which permeate the region; mountains in the chain are often clouded in a hazy mist that may appear as smoke rising from the forest.

== History ==
=== Prior professional baseball in Knoxville ===
Knoxville has hosted Minor League Baseball teams since the late 19th century. The city's professional baseball history dates back to 1896 with the formation of the Knoxville Indians who played two seasons in the Southeastern League. They were followed by the Knoxville Reds (1902–1905). In 1904, the Reds won the city's first professional championship in the Tennessee–Alabama League. The Knoxville Appalachians began play in 1909 as members of the original Class B South Atlantic League. They dropped out of the "Sally League" that season, but continued in the Class D Southeastern League (1910) and Appalachian League (1911–1914). The Appalachians adopted the Reds moniker from the previous Knoxville team in 1912.

The club returned to the South Atlantic loop, now Class B, as the Smokies from 1925 to 1929. On July 22, 1931, the Mobile Bears franchise of the A1 Southern Association moved to Knoxville and played as the Smokies through July 5, 1944, when the club returned to Mobile. The transfer marked the end of Knoxville's membership in the Southern Association.

In 1946, the Smokies joined the Class B Tri-State League and played in it until the loop folded in 1955. But in July 1956, when the Montgomery Rebels of the Class A South Atlantic League needed a new home, they transferred to Knoxville. The Smokies' manager that season was Earl Weaver who was elected to the Baseball Hall of Fame in 1996.

=== Double-A ===
The Smokies were reclassified as Double-A with the rest of the Sally League in 1963, and were charter members of the Sally's successor, the Southern League, in 1964. Apart from a four-year (1968–1971) hiatus, they have continued in the Southern loop ever since.

Knoxville returned in 1972 as the Knoxville White Sox or Knox Sox, the Chicago White Sox's Double-A club. They transferred their affiliation to the Toronto Blue Jays in 1980, a link that lasted until 1999. For the first 13 of those years, the team was officially known as the Knoxville Blue Jays, or locally referred to as simply the K-Jays. The historic Smokies moniker was reintroduced beginning in the 1993 season.

From 1954 to 1999, Knoxville baseball teams played in Bill Meyer Stadium, formerly known as Knoxville Municipal Stadium, on Neal Ridley Field. The stadium was named for Knoxville native son and former Pittsburgh Pirates manager Billy Meyer. The field was named in memory of Neal Ridley, a former team owner, in 1984, following his death the previous year.

From 1999 to 2005, the Smokies were the Double-A affiliate of the St. Louis Cardinals. However, when the Cardinals purchased the El Paso Diablos, which had been the Arizona Diamondbacks' Double-A affiliate, the Diamondbacks retained the Smokies as their new Double-A affiliate. On September 21, 2006, the Chicago Cubs, who had previously had a Double-A affiliation with division rival West Tenn Diamond Jaxx, reached a two-year player development contract with the Smokies through the 2008 season.

==== Chicago Cubs (2007–present) ====
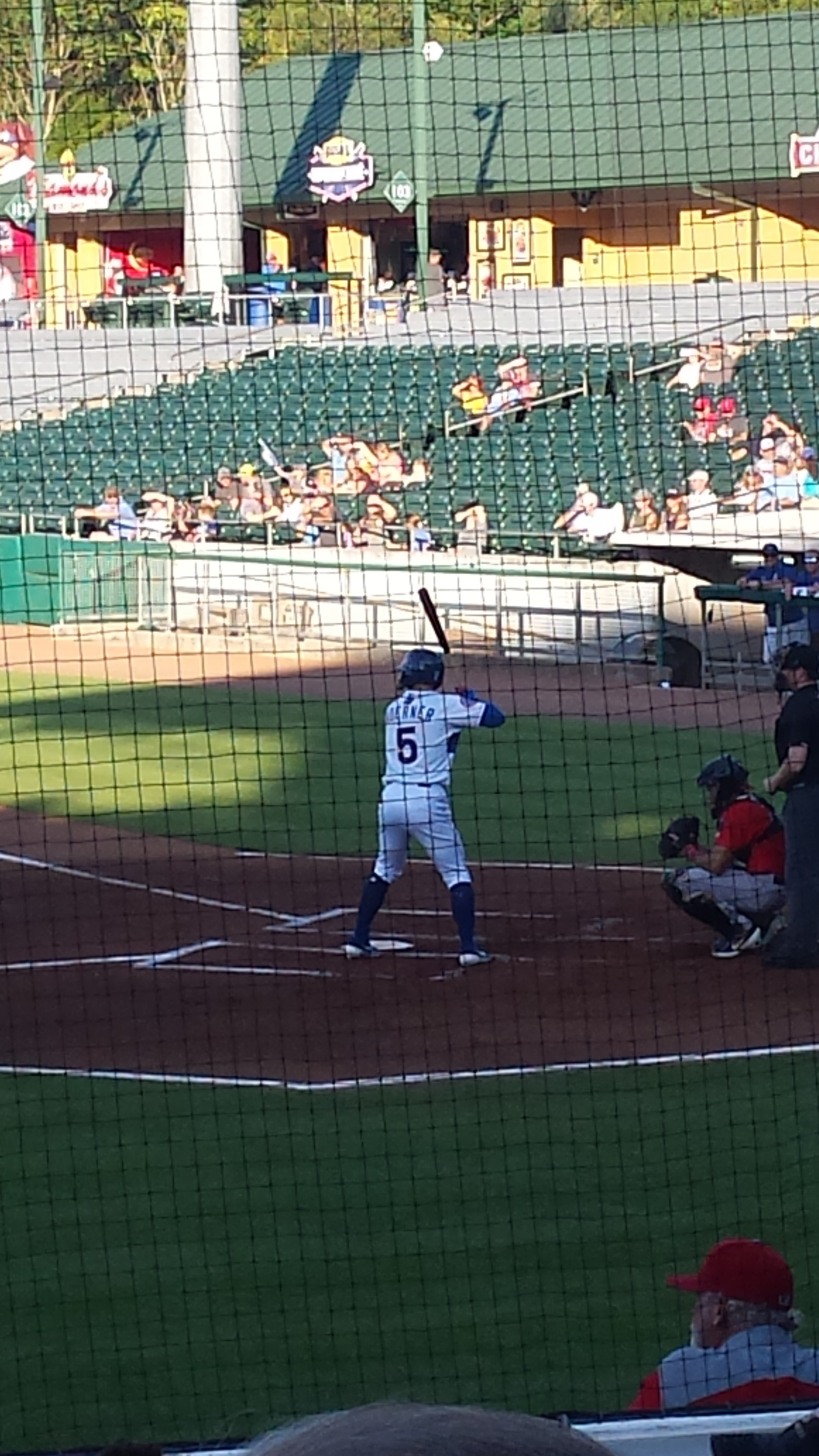
Nico Hoerner takes an at-bat for the Tennessee Smokies in 2019

In December 2008, Hall of Famer and former Chicago Cubs All-Star second baseman Ryne Sandberg was named manager for the 2009 season. Sandberg led the Smokies to a second-half Southern League North Division crown and a 3–1 divisional playoff series win over the Huntsville Stars. The Smokies would eventually fall 3-games-to-1 to the Jacksonville Suns for the 2009 Southern League Championship.

In June 2013, the then-Smokies' ownership group, led by Cleveland Browns owner Jimmy Haslam, sold the team to Randy Boyd, a local Knoxville businessman. Though a devoted baseball fan, Boyd is not involved in the day-to-day management of the team, delegating those responsibilities to CEO Doug Kirchhofer and General Manager Brian Cox. In 2016, speculation began that Boyd was wanting to move the Smokies back to Knoxville after he had purchased several parcels in downtown Knoxville. Boyd said he had envisioned a baseball stadium on that site, but at that time had no plans to bring the baseball team back to Knoxville until 2025, when the current stadium contract expires.

On July 11, 2014, The Chicago Cubs and Tennessee Smokies announced an extension to their Player Development Contract (PDC) for the maximum possible term of four years. The agreement meant the Smokies were to remain the Cubs' Double-A affiliate through the 2018 season.

On October 22, 2014, the Smokies revealed new logos, colors, and uniforms that reflected their ongoing relationship with the Chicago Cubs organization.

Smokies Stadium experienced its largest baseball attendance ever of 7,958 on May 13, 2017, against the Montgomery Biscuits. The Smokies lost the game 3–1, which was also Star Wars Night. The previous attendance record was the 7,866 on July 24, 2015, against the Chattanooga Lookouts. The Smokies won the game 8–4, which was also Toy Story Night and Daddy-Daughter Date Night.

In conjunction with Major League Baseball's restructuring of Minor League Baseball in 2021, the Smokies were organized into the Double-A South. In 2022, the Double-A South became known as the Southern League, the name historically used by the regional circuit prior to the 2021 reorganization.

In 2021, Tennessee Smokies owner Randy Boyd announced that the team would be moving back to Knoxville in a new stadium built in the Old City neighborhood, with the plans to play at the new stadium in 2024. It was announced the team would revive its former name of the Knoxville Smokies upon the move.

The 2022 Smokies qualified for the Southern League playoffs by virtue of having the second-best full-season record in the Northern Division behind the Rocket City Trash Pandas, who won both halves of the season. Tennessee defeated Rocket City, 2–1, to win the Northern Division title and advance to the finals against the Pensacola Blue Wahoos.

== Season-by-season results ==
Season	Record	Finish	Manager	Playoffs
2000	71–69	4th	Rocket Wheeler	—
2001	80–60	2nd	Rocket Wheeler	—
2002	69–71	6th	Rocket Wheeler	—
2003	72–67	4th	Mark DeJohn	Lost to Carolina Mudcats, 3–1, in semifinals
2004	69–71	6th	Mark DeJohn	Defeated Chattanooga Lookouts, 3–1, in semifinals Declared co–Southern League champions with Mobile BayBears*
2005	64–76	7th	Tony Perezchica	—
2006	70–69	5th	Bill Plummer	—
2007	73–65	2nd	Pat Listach	Lost to Huntsville Stars, 3–2, in semifinals
2008	62–77	5th	Buddy Bailey	—
2009	71–69	2nd	Ryne Sandberg	Defeated Huntsville Stars, 3–1, in semifinals Lost to Jacksonville Suns, 3–1, in championship
2010	86–53	1st	Bill Dancy	Defeated West Tenn Diamond Jaxx, 3–1, in semifinals Lost to Jacksonville Suns, 3–1, in championship
2011	83–57	1st	Brian Harper	Defeated Chattanooga Lookouts, 3–0, in semifinals Lost to Mobile BayBears, 3–1, in championship
2012	72–68	3rd	Buddy Bailey	—
2013	76–62	T-1st	Buddy Bailey	Lost to Birmingham Barons, 3–2, in semifinals
2014	66–73	2nd	Buddy Bailey	—
2015	76–63	3rd	Buddy Bailey	—
2016	58–81	9th	Mark Johnson	—
2017	68–70	T-6th	Mark Johnson	—
2018	67–71	T-5th	Mark Johnson	—
2019	58–81	9th	Jimmy Gonzalez	—
2020	Cancelled due to COVID-19 pandemic			
2021	46–63	7th	Mark Johnson	—
2022	71–66	2nd	Michael Ryan	Defeated Rocket City Trash Pandas, 2–1, in semifinals Lost to Pensacola Blue Wahoos, 2–1, in championship
2023	75–62	1st	Michael RyanM; Kevin Graber	Defeated Chattanooga Lookouts, 2–0, in semifinals Defeated Pensacola Blue Wahoos, 2–0, in championship
2024	87–50	1st	Lance Rymel	Lost to Birmingham Barons, 2–1, in semifinals
2025	69–67	3rd	Lance Rymel	—
Totals	1,690–1,614	—	—	2 League titles, 6 Division titles

* Due to Hurricane Ivan, the finals series was cancelled. Tennessee and Mobile were declared co-champions.

=== Pre-2000 playoff results ===
- 1999: Lost to Orlando 3–1 in semifinals.
- 1998: Lost to Jacksonville 3–0 in semifinals.
- 1997: Lost to Greenville 3–1 in semifinals.
- 1993: Defeated Greenville 3–2 in semifinals; lost to Birmingham 3–1 in finals.
- 1991: Lost to Birmingham 3–0 in semifinals.
- 1986: Lost to Huntsville 3–1 in semifinals.
- 1985: Lost to Huntsville 3–1 in semifinals.
- 1984: Defeated Nashville 3–1 in semifinals; lost to Charlotte 3–0 in championship.
- 1982: Lost to Nashville 3–1 in first round.
- 1978: Defeated Savannah 2–1 to win league championship.
- 1974: Defeated Jacksonville 3–2 to win league championship.

== Television and radio ==
All Smokies games are shown live on MiLB.TV. Some games are televised on Marquee Sports Network, which is not available in Tennessee. All games are also broadcast on 92.5 WKCE and AM 1180 in Knoxville. The current voice of the Smokies is Mick Gillispie. The secondary broadcaster is Andy Brock. The pre and postgame shows are hosted by Jackson Williams and Joseph Bonanno. Bear Trax is a weekly television show hosted by Mick Gillispie and Charlie Walter about the Smokies and airs at 11pm ET on WTNZ Fox43.

== Roster ==
Knoxville Smokies roster
Players	Coaches/Other
Pitchers: 9 Jackson Brockett; 19 Brooks Caple ~; 33 Nick Dean; 39 Ethan Flanagan; 44 Jake Knapp; 16 Luis Martinez-Gomez; 35 Brody McCullough ~; 33 Grayson Moore; 34 Dawson Netz; 38 Kenyi Perez; 21 Tyler Ras; 4 Vince Reilly; 41 Erian Rodriguez ‡; 16 Yenrri Rojas; 45 Luis Rujano; 43 Marino Santy; 30 Frankie Scalzo Jr.; 20 Tyler Schlaffer; 40 Connor Schultz; 24 Kevin Valdez; 45 Jacob Wallace; Catchers: 7 Ariel Armas; 3 Colin Hynek; 6 Miguel Useche; Infielders: 25 Edgar Alvarez; 12 Drew Bowser; 32 Dom Krupinski; 5 Alex Madera; 1 Karson Simas; 29 Carter Trice; Outfielders: 22 Andy Garriola; 2 Kane Kepley; 13 Alex Ramírez	Manager: 28 Lance Rymel; Coaches: 36 Joe Curci (development); 4 Derron Davis (bench); 27 Joe Dillon (hitting); 24 George Thanopoulos (pitching); 37 José Zapata (pitching); 60-day injured list: -- Zane Mills (full season); 7-day injured list; * On Chicago Cubs 40-man roster; ~ Development list; # Rehab assignment; ∞ Reserve list; ‡ Restricted list; § Suspended list; † Temporarily inactive list; Roster updated September 4, 2026; Transactions; → More rosters: MiLB • Southern League; → Chicago Cubs minor league players

== Notable alumni ==
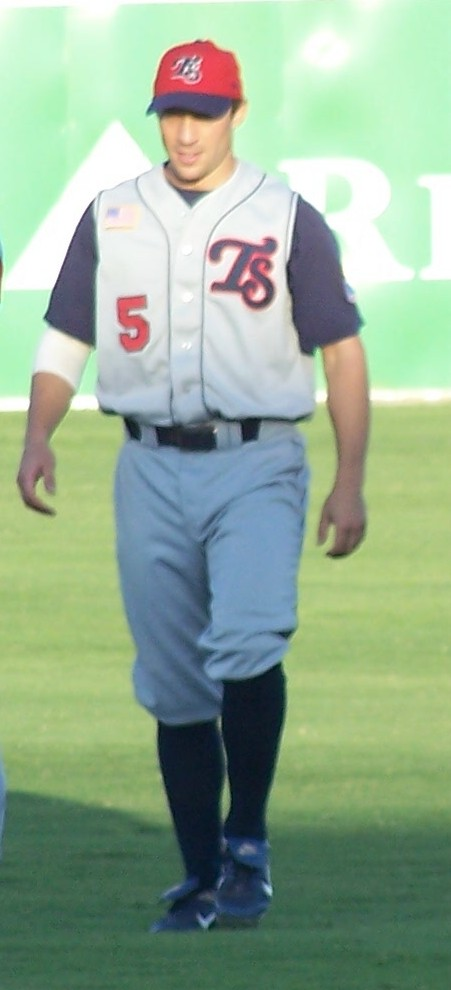
Sam Fuld with the Smokies in 2008

- Rick Ankiel
- Carmen Cali
- Stephen Drew
- Scott Effross
- Joe Girardi
- Shawn Green
- Roy Halladay
- Dan Haren
- Dan Uggla
- David Wells
- Vernon Wells
- Jeff Kent
- Orlando Hudson
- Mark Reynolds
- Anthony Reyes
- Kerry Wood
- Miguel Montero
- Yadier Molina
- Jake Fox
- Sam Fuld
- Jeff Samardzija
- Cristian Guzmán
- Chris Carpenter
- Carlos Delgado
- Felipe López
- Jayson Werth
- Casey Blake
- Harold Baines
- Mike Timlin
- Marwin González
- Kelvim Escobar
- Ross Ohlendorf
- Alberto González
- Kevin Cash
- Gabe Gross
- Reed Johnson
- DeWayne Wise
- Micah Owings
- Sean Gallagher
- Kevin Hart
- Carmen Pignatiello
- Brandon Lyon
- DJ LeMahieu
- Dustin Nippert
- Tony Peña
- Doug Slaten
- Bill Murphy
- Starlin Castro
- Tyler Colvin
- Fred McGriff
- Jake Arrieta
- Javier Báez
- Kris Bryant
- Jorge Soler
- Addison Russell
- Kyle Schwarber
- Mitch Webster
- Cecil Fielder
- Rusty Kuntz
- Steve Trout
- Fred Manrique
- Kevin Pasley
- Mike Sharperson
- Mark Eichhorn
- Ted Cox
- Paul Hodgson
- Steve Senteney
- Jimmy Key
- Mickey Lolich
- Hoyt Wilhelm
- Pete Crow-Armstrong
