= Columbia Mules =

- 1921; Columbia, Tennessee

Minor league affiliations
- Class: Class D
- League: Alabama–Tennessee League

Major league affiliations
- Team: Unaffiliated

Minor league titles
- League titles: None

Team data
- Name: Columbia Mules
- Ballpark: Pillow Park

The Columbia Mules were a Minor League Baseball team that played in the Class D Alabama–Tennessee League in 1921. They were located in Columbia, Tennessee, and were named in reference to Columbia being known as the "Mule Capital of the World" and holding "Mule Day" celebrations since 1840. Their home games were played at Pillow Park

Columbia was previously represented by an unnamed team in the Tennessee–Alabama League from 1903 to 1904. The Mules lost their season opener against the Tri-Cities Triplets, 4–2, on May 16, 1921. They ended the season with a 42–46 (.477) record, placing third out of four teams. They did not qualify for the championship playoffs as they did not win either half of the league' split season.

The city did not field another team until a different Columbia Mules played in the Big South League in 1996.

== Season results ==
Half	Regular season				Postseason			Ref.
Half	Record	Win %	Finish	GB	Record	Win %	Result	Ref.
1st	25–27	.480	3rd	6	—	—	Result	—
2nd	17–19	.472	3rd (tie)	2	—	—		—
Totals	42–46	.477	3rd	7 1/2	—	—	—	—
