= List of Sigma Alpha chapters =

Sigma Alpha is an American professional sorority for agricultural students. It was established at Ohio State University in 1978. Following are the chapters of Sigma Alpha, with active chapters indicated in bold and inactive chapters in italics.

Chapter	Charter date	Institution	Location	Status	Ref.
Alpha	January 26, 1978	Ohio State University	Columbus, Ohio	Active	
**Beta**	April 14, 1984	Purdue University	West Lafayette, Indiana	Active	
**Gamma**	1985–198x ?; 1990	Michigan State University	East Lansing, Michigan	Active	
**Delta**	1986	Iowa State University	Ames, Iowa	Active	
**Epsilon**	1989	Pennsylvania State University	State College, Pennsylvania	Active	
**Zeta**	1989	Louisiana State University	Baton Rouge, Louisiana	Active	
**Eta**	1990	University of Connecticut	Storrs, Connecticut	Active	
**Theta**	October 7, 1990	University of Tennessee	Knoxville, Tennessee	Active	
**Iota**	1990	University of Arkansas	Fayetteville, Arkansas	Active	
**Kappa**	1990	California Polytechnic State University, San Luis Obispo	San Luis Obispo, California	Active	
**Lambda**	1990	University of California, Davis	Davis, California	Active	
Mu	1991	University of Vermont	Burlington, Vermont	Inactive	
**Nu**	May 1991	Colorado State University	Fort Collins, Colorado	Active	
**Xi**	October 5, 1991	Oregon State University	Corvallis, Oregon	Active	
**Omicron**	December 7, 1991	Truman State University	Kirksville, Missouri	Active	
**Pi**	1992	Virginia Tech	Blacksburg, Virginia	Active	
**Rho**	199x ?	Texas Tech University	Lubbock, Texas	Active	
**Sigma**	199x ?	Western Illinois University	Macomb, Illinois	Active	
**Tau**	199x ?	Clemson University	Clemson, South Carolina	Active	
**Upsilon**	199x ?	North Dakota State University	Fargo, North Dakota	Active	
**Phi**	199x ?	East Texas A&M University	Commerce, Texas	Active	(Note: Chapter formed at Texas A&M University-Commerce, which became East Texas A&M University in 2024.)
**Chi**	1995	West Virginia University	Morgantown, West Virginia	Active	
**Psi**	199x ?	Middle Tennessee State University	Murfreesboro, Tennessee	Active	
**Omega**	199x ?	South Dakota State University	Brookings, South Dakota	Active	
Alpha Alpha	199x ?			Unassigned	
**Alpha Beta**	199x ?	Northwest Missouri State University	Maryville, Missouri	Active	
**Alpha Gamma**	December 2, 1995	Southern Illinois University Carbondale	Carbondale, Illinois	Active	(Note: Chapter formed from the Alpha Gamma Rho Rhomates, an auxiliary of the agriculture fraternity Alpha Gamma Rho.)
**Alpha Delta**	199x ?	University of Nebraska–Lincoln	Lincoln, Nebraska	Active	
**Alpha Epsilon**	1997	University of Wyoming	Laramie, Wyoming	Active	
**Alpha Zeta**	199x ?	Tarleton State University	Stephenville, Texas	Active	
**Alpha Eta**	199x ?	Stephen F. Austin State University	Nacogdoches, Texas	Active	
**Alpha Theta**	September 26, 1998	North Carolina State University	Raleigh, North Carolina	Active	
**Alpha Iota**	1998	California State University, Chico	Chico, California	Active	
**Alpha Kappa**	1999	University of Delaware	Newark, Delaware	Active	
**Alpha Lambda**		Delaware Valley University	Doylestown, Pennsylvania	Active	
**Alpha Mu**	January 29, 2000	University of Illinois Urbana-Champaign	Champaign, Illinois	Active	
**Alpha Nu**	2000 ?	Arizona State University	Tempe, Arizona	Active	
**Alpha Xi**	April 29, 2000	Missouri State University	Springfield, Missouri	Active	
**Alpha Omicron**	September 30, 2000	University of Georgia	Athens, Georgia	Active	
**Alpha Pi**	March 2001	Texas A&M University	College Station, Texas	Active	
Alpha Rho	20xx ?	University of Arizona	Tucson, Arizona	Active	
**Alpha Sigma**	October 30, 2018	New Mexico State University	Las Cruces, New Mexico	Active	
**Alpha Tau**	August 25, 2001	University of Wisconsin–Madison	Madison, Wisconsin	Active	
**Alpha Upsilon**	October 6, 2001	Murray State University	Murray, Kentucky	Active	
**Alpha Phi**	200x ?	California State University, Fresno	Fresno, California	Active	
**Alpha Chi**	January 26, 2002	University of Missouri	Columbia, Missouri	Active	
**Alpha Psi**	200x ?	Cornell University	Ithaca, New York	Active	
**Alpha Omega**	200x ?	Kansas State University	Manhattan, Kansas	Active	
**Beta Alpha**	2003	University of Maryland, College Park	College Park, Maryland	Active	
Beta Beta	200x ?			Unassigned	
**Beta Gamma**	March 20, 2004	University of Florida	Gainesville, Florida	Active	(Note: Chapter formed from Sigma Phi Alpha (local), established on December 2, 1991 from the former Little Sisters of Alpha Gamma Rho.)
**Beta Delta**	200x ?	University of Wisconsin–Platteville	Platteville, Wisconsin	Active	
**Beta Epsilon**	September 24, 2005	University of Idaho	Moscow, Idaho	Active	
**Beta Zeta**	February 18, 2006	University of Wisconsin–River Falls	River Falls, Wisconsin	Active	
**Beta Eta**	April 1, 2006	Auburn University	Auburn, Alabama	Active	
**Beta Theta**	April 25, 2006	University of Tennessee at Martin	Martin, Tennessee	Active	
Beta Iota	2007	Florida Southern College	Lakeland, Florida	Inactive	
**Beta Kappa**	20xx ?	University of New Hampshire	Durham, New Hampshire	Active	
Beta Lambda	20xx ?	University of Rhode Island	Kingston, Rhode Island	Inactive	
**Beta Mu**	2023	Fort Hays State University	Hays, Kansas	Active	
**Beta Nu**	20xx ?	Abraham Baldwin Agricultural College	Tifton, Georgia	Active	
**Beta Xi**	20xx ?	Illinois State University	Normal, Illinois	Active	
**Beta Omicron**	March 23, 2013	University of Kentucky	Lexington, Kentucky	Active	
**Beta Pi**	May 4, 2013	Sam Houston State University	Huntsville, Texas	Active	
**Beta Rho**	201x ?	Southern Arkansas University	Magnolia, Arkansas	Active	
**Beta Sigma**	2014	Western Kentucky University	Bowling Green, Kentucky	Active	
**Beta Tau**	201x ?	Arkansas Tech University	Russellville, Arkansas	Active	
**Beta Upsilon**	201x ?	Mississippi State University	Mississippi State, Mississippi	Active	
**Beta Phi**	201x ?	Morehead State University	Morehead, Kentucky	Active	
**Beta Chi**	2017	Eastern Kentucky University	Richmond, Kentucky	Active	
**Beta Psi**	2017 ?	Oklahoma State University	Stillwater, Oklahoma	Active	
**Beta Omega**	2017	Washington State University	Pullman, Washington	Active	
**Gamma Alpha**	201x ?	Wilmington College	Wilmington, Ohio	Active	
**Gamma Beta**	March 3, 2018	Montana State University	Bozeman, Montana	Active	
Gamma Gamma	20xx ?			Unassigned	
**Gamma Delta**	20xx ?	State University of New York at Cobleskill	Cobleskill, New York	Active	
**Gamma Zeta**	20xx ?	Tennessee Tech	Cookeville, Tennessee	Active	
**Gamma Eta**	2023	Utah State University	Logan, Utah	Active	
