= Columbia Tennessee–Alabama League team =

Columbia
- 1903–1904; Columbia, Tennessee

Minor league affiliations
- Class: Unclassified (1903–1904)
- League: Tennessee–Alabama League (1903–1904)

Major league affiliations
- Team: Unaffiliated (1903–1904)

Minor league titles
- League titles (0): None

Team data
- Ballpark: Unknown (1903–1904)

Columbia was an independent Minor League Baseball team that played in the Tennessee–Alabama League from 1903 to 1904. They were located in Columbia, Tennessee, and bore no moniker.

Columbia's August 10 season opener was played on the road and resulted in only three innings being played before it was called on account of rain with Columbia trailing Pulaski, 8–1. On September 13, Columbia closed out the season on the road with an 8–5 loss to Pulaski. The season was called early after New Decatur lost several players and did not travel to Pulaski to play the final series. Columbia compiled a win–loss record of either 13–16 (.448) or 12–17 (.415), placing third either way.

The league expanded to eight teams in 1904. Columbia started their second season with an 8–7 home win over Decatur. They ended the season on August 20 with a 16–3 win over Decatur at home. Columbia finished in second place with a 51–34 (.600) record, two games out of first.

The city did not field another professional baseball team until 1921 when the Columbia Mules joined the Alabama–Tennessee League.

== Notable players ==
The only player from Columbia to also play in Major League Baseball during his career was King Bailey, who pitched in and won one game for the Cincinnati Reds in 1895.
