= Pulaski riot =

1868 riot in Tennessee, US

- Part of Reconstruction Era
- Date: January 7, 1868
- Location: Pulaski, Tennessee
- Caused by: Dispute between two local men
- Goals: Suppression of black people
- Methods: Armed attack

Parties
White mob: Ku Klux Klan; Other white people	Freedmen

Number
18 plus	9

Casualties and losses
None	Seven, with two mortally wounded

Casualties
- Death: Two African Americans believed killed
- Charged: None

The Pulaski riot was a race riot that occurred in Pulaski, Tennessee, on January 7, 1868. While the riot appeared to be based in a trade dispute of the previous summer between Calvin Lamberth, a white man, and Calvin Carter, an African American, it was provoked when Lamberth shot a friend of Carter's over rumored comments about the former's black mistress.

After Lamberth shot Carter's friend, Whitlock Fields, numerous other armed whites came from nearby houses and attacked Carter and seven other black men at a nearby black-owned grocery store. Although the constable arranged a ceasefire, after the freedmen gathered at the door of the store, some eighteen whites rushed and shot at them at close range. They murdered one man, mortally wounded another, and injured four. No whites were injured or prosecuted. The incident was investigated by the Freedmen's Bureau office of Nashville, Tennessee.

== Background of incident ==
In December 1865, white Confederate veterans had founded the Ku Klux Klan, a secret vigilante organization, in Pulaski. Chapters had been started in numerous other towns in Tennessee and other states. Members generally operated in groups and often threatened intended victims at night, trying to suppress black political actions and sometimes economic enterprises.

Michael Walsh, Sub. Asst. Comr. of the Bureau of Refugees, Freedmen and Abandoned Lands office in Nashville, known as the Freedmen's Bureau, arrived in Pulaski on January 9, 1868, to investigate and report on the murders and shootings in the town. He learned that Calvin Lamberth, a white man who owned a grocery, and Calvin Carter, a freedman, apparently had some kind of feud from a trade dispute starting the previous summer. Carter may have been related to John Carter, another freedman in town who owned a grocery store. Whites resented competing with men who had so recently been enslaved.

But the immediate cause of violence was that Lamberth was told that Carter and his friend Whitlock Fields had "threatened" his Black mistress, warning her to stay away from his store. Lamberth found Fields on the street and shot him twice with a pistol. Fields could not return fire because his gun did not work. Hearing shots, more than 18 white men ran from their homes with pistols and shotguns to suppress any Black violence.

The mob attacked freedman John Carter's nearby grocery store. Eight Black people, including Calvin Carter, had gathered there. Though initially caught unaware, a few of them were armed, and together they returned fire and kept the whites at bay. After many volleys of shots, the town constable arranged a ceasefire.

As the black men left the store, eighteen of the white mob rushed the men and fired at them, killing Orange Rhodes and mortally wounding Calvin Carter. Two other African Americans were severely wounded and two more described as slightly wounded. None of the white men were injured.

Given the armed preparation by the whites and their concerted group action against the freedmen, Walsh believed they were likely members of the Ku Klux Klan (KKK).

In addition to the riot, whites killed black people in other local incidents, and conducted campaigns of general harassment against freedmen and their sympathizers in the area. The riot was a demonstration of the KKK's growing power in Giles County, and the Middle Tennessee area.

KKK members were said to commit more than 1,300 murders during the run up the Election of 1868. Most of the violence were directed towards black people to intimidate them and break Republican support, though "carpetbagger" and "scalawag" whites were also targeted.

== Newspaper articles ==
- "Negro Riot in Pulaski — One Negro Killed and Five Wounded". Nashville Union and American. January 9, 1868. p. 3.
- "The Riot at Pulaski". Nashville Union and American. January 11, 1868. p. 2.
- "The Riot -- A Base Fabrication". Pulaski Citizen (Pulaski, Tennessee). January 17, 1868. p. 3.
