= Pulaski, Tennessee =

- City
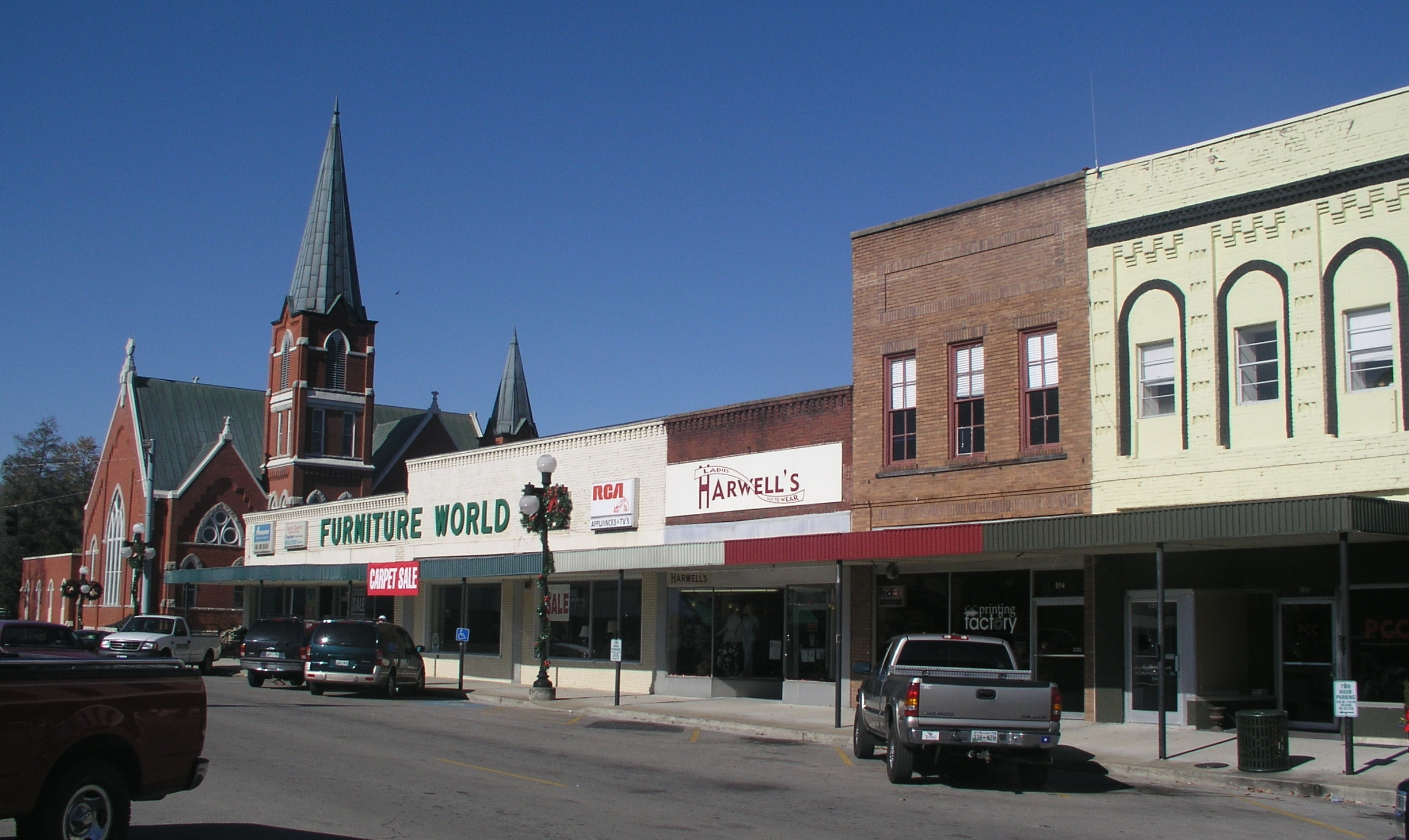
- Town Square in Pulaski

- Seal

- Location of Pulaski in Giles County, Tennessee.
- Coordinates: 35°11′45″N 87°02′04″W
- Country: United States
- State: Tennessee
- County: Giles
- Incorporated: 1809
- Named for: Kazimierz Pułaski

Government
  - Mayor: J.J. Brindley

Area
  - Total: 7.5 sq mi (19.4 km^{2})
  - Land: 7.51 sq mi (19.44 km^{2})
  - Water: 0 sq mi (0.00 km^{2})
- Elevation: 699 ft (213 m)

Population (2020)
  - Total: 8,397
  - Density: 1,118.7/sq mi (431.92/km^{2})
- Time zone: UTC-6 (Central (CST))
  - Summer (DST): UTC-5 (CDT)
- ZIP code: 38478
- Area code: 931
- FIPS code: 47-61040
- GNIS feature ID: 1298659
- Website: www.pulaski-tn.com

Pulaski is a city in Giles County and the county seat of Giles County, which is located on the central-southern border of Tennessee, United States. The population was 8,397 at the 2020 census. It was named after Casimir Pulaski, a noted Polish-born general on the Patriot side in the American Revolutionary War. Pulaski is the birthplace of the Ku Klux Klan.

== History ==
Pulaski was founded in 1809. During the Civil War, after the Union took control of Tennessee in 1862, thousands of African Americans left plantations and farms to join their lines for refuge. The Army set up a contraband camp in Pulaski to help house the freedmen and their families, feed them, and put them to work. In addition, education classes were started. The vicinity of Pulaski was the site of a number of skirmishes during the Franklin–Nashville Campaign. Union troops occupied the state from 1862, and hundreds of African Americans left plantations even before the Emancipation Proclamation to join their lines.

In 1863, Confederate courier Sam Davis was hanged in Pulaski by the Union Army as a spy.

After the war, in late 1865, six Tennessee veterans of the Confederate Army founded a secret society, later known as the Ku Klux Klan (KKK). This was the first chapter. These men, John C. Lester, John B. Kennedy, James R. Crowe, Frank O. McCord, Richard R. Reed, and J. Calvin Jones, established the KKK on December 24, 1865. They created rules for a secret, hierarchical society devoted to suppressing freedmen and their white allies, and maintaining white supremacy.

The white insurgents were determined to fight secretly against the political advancement of freedmen and of sympathetic whites. Chapters of the KKK quickly were organized in other parts of the state and the South. KKK members often attacked their victims at night, to increase the intimidation of threats and assaults. Other incidents of racial violence against blacks also took place. The Pulaski riot was a race riot initiated against blacks that took place in the city in the winter of 1868, following a heated election season.

Martin Methodist College was founded in Pulaski in 1870 as a private college for white students. Martin Methodist College was merged with the UT System in 2021 to become the new campus under the University of Tennessee System. It is now known as University of Tennessee Southern and is a public university.

== Geography ==
Pulaski is located in central Giles County at 35°11′45″N 87°2′4″W (35.195786, -87.034328). The downtown area is on the north side of Richland Creek, a southward-flowing tributary of the Elk River.

U.S. Route 31 passes through the center of Pulaski as First Street, leading north 30 miles (48 km) to Columbia and southeast 19 miles (31 km) to Ardmore at the Alabama border. U.S. Route 31 Alternate (E. Grigsby Street) leaves U.S. 31 in the north part of Pulaski and heads northeast 23 miles (37 km) to Lewisburg. U.S. Route 64 passes south of Pulaski on a bypass route; it leads east 29 miles (47 km) to Fayetteville and west 18 miles (29 km) to Lawrenceburg.

According to the United States Census Bureau, the city has a total area of 7.2 square miles (18.7 km^{2}), all land.

=== Climate ===
Climate data for Pulaski, Tennessee (1991–2020 normals, extremes 1957–present)
Month	Jan	Feb	Mar	Apr	May	Jun	Jul	Aug	Sep	Oct	Nov	Dec	Year
Record high °F (°C)	76 (24)	83 (28)	86 (30)	91 (33)	96 (36)	106 (41)	105 (41)	104 (40)	100 (38)	95 (35)	86 (30)	78 (26)	106 (41)
Mean maximum °F (°C)	67.8 (19.9)	71.4 (21.9)	78.4 (25.8)	83.1 (28.4)	88.0 (31.1)	92.8 (33.8)	95.0 (35.0)	94.7 (34.8)	92.2 (33.4)	85.4 (29.7)	76.9 (24.9)	67.9 (19.9)	96.7 (35.9)
Mean daily maximum °F (°C)	48.2 (9.0)	52.5 (11.4)	61.2 (16.2)	70.9 (21.6)	78.0 (25.6)	84.9 (29.4)	88.1 (31.2)	87.8 (31.0)	83.0 (28.3)	72.5 (22.5)	60.8 (16.0)	51.3 (10.7)	69.9 (21.1)
Daily mean °F (°C)	36.8 (2.7)	40.3 (4.6)	48.2 (9.0)	57.1 (13.9)	65.3 (18.5)	73.2 (22.9)	76.8 (24.9)	75.8 (24.3)	69.7 (20.9)	58.2 (14.6)	47.0 (8.3)	39.7 (4.3)	57.3 (14.1)
Mean daily minimum °F (°C)	25.4 (−3.7)	28.1 (−2.2)	35.2 (1.8)	43.3 (6.3)	52.6 (11.4)	61.4 (16.3)	65.5 (18.6)	63.8 (17.7)	56.4 (13.6)	43.9 (6.6)	33.2 (0.7)	28.2 (−2.1)	44.8 (7.1)
Mean minimum °F (°C)	9.6 (−12.4)	14.3 (−9.8)	21.1 (−6.1)	29.5 (−1.4)	39.7 (4.3)	52.0 (11.1)	58.6 (14.8)	56.2 (13.4)	43.9 (6.6)	30.1 (−1.1)	20.6 (−6.3)	15.3 (−9.3)	6.8 (−14.0)
Record low °F (°C)	−16 (−27)	−6 (−21)	3 (−16)	22 (−6)	30 (−1)	39 (4)	49 (9)	50 (10)	32 (0)	22 (−6)	10 (−12)	−8 (−22)	−16 (−27)
Average precipitation inches (mm)	5.29 (134)	5.66 (144)	5.48 (139)	5.13 (130)	4.57 (116)	4.78 (121)	4.83 (123)	4.37 (111)	4.12 (105)	3.81 (97)	4.26 (108)	6.28 (160)	58.58 (1,488)
Average snowfall inches (cm)	1.0 (2.5)	0.4 (1.0)	0.3 (0.76)	0.0 (0.0)	0.0 (0.0)	0.0 (0.0)	0.0 (0.0)	0.0 (0.0)	0.0 (0.0)	0.0 (0.0)	0.0 (0.0)	0.2 (0.51)	1.9 (4.8)
Average precipitation days (≥ 0.01 in)	10.8	11.1	11.6	10.5	10.6	10.6	10.1	9.1	7.2	7.9	9.1	11.7	120.3
Average snowy days (≥ 0.1 in)	0.5	0.4	0.3	0.0	0.0	0.0	0.0	0.0	0.0	0.0	0.0	0.2	1.4
Source: NOAA

== Demographics ==
Historical population
Census	Pop.	Note	%±
1850	1,137		—
1870	2,070		—
1880	2,089		0.9%
1890	2,274		8.9%
1900	2,838		24.8%
1910	2,928		3.2%
1920	2,780		−5.1%
1930	3,367		21.1%
1940	5,314		57.8%
1950	5,762		8.4%
1960	6,616		14.8%
1970	6,989		5.6%
1980	7,184		2.8%
1990	7,895		9.9%
2000	7,871		−0.3%
2010	7,870		0.0%
2020	8,397		6.7%

=== 2020 census ===
As of the 2020 census, Pulaski had a population of 8,397, with 3,359 households and 1,746 families residing in the city. The median age was 38.0 years, with 21.1% of residents under the age of 18 and 20.1% 65 years of age or older. For every 100 females there were 85.4 males, and for every 100 females age 18 and over there were 82.5 males age 18 and over.

96.2% of residents lived in urban areas, while 3.8% lived in rural areas.

There were 3,359 households in Pulaski, of which 29.0% had children under the age of 18 living in them. Of all households, 29.7% were married-couple households, 21.6% were households with a male householder and no spouse or partner present, and 40.7% were households with a female householder and no spouse or partner present. About 38.0% of all households were made up of individuals and 16.9% had someone living alone who was 65 years of age or older.

There were 3,821 housing units, of which 12.1% were vacant. The homeowner vacancy rate was 3.0% and the rental vacancy rate was 9.7%.

Racial composition as of the 2020 census
Race	Number	Percent
White	5,720	68.1%
Black or African American	1,832	21.8%
American Indian and Alaska Native	42	0.5%
Asian	71	0.8%
Native Hawaiian and Other Pacific Islander	6	0.1%
Some other race	92	1.1%
Two or more races	634	7.6%
Hispanic or Latino (of any race)	254	3.0%

=== 2000 census ===
As of the 2000 census, there was a population of 7,871, with 3,455 households and 2,038 families residing in the city. The population density was 1,200.8 inhabitants per square mile (463.6/km^{2}). There were 3,888 housing units at an average density of 593.2 per square mile (229.0/km^{2}). The racial makeup of the city was 70.40% White, 27.06% African American, 0.24% Native American, 0.85% Asian, 0.01% Pacific Islander, 0.23% from other races, and 1.21% from two or more races. Hispanic or Latino people of any race were 1.11% of the population.

There were 3,455 households, out of which 26.0% had children under the age of 18 living with them, 37.7% were married couples living together, 18.2% had a female householder with no husband present, and 41.0% were non-families. 37.5% of all households were made up of individuals, and 17.6% had someone living alone who was 65 years of age or older. The average household size was 2.15 and the average family size was 2.82.

In the city, the population was spread out, with 22.1% under the age of 18, 10.2% from 18 to 24, 26.0% from 25 to 44, 22.1% from 45 to 64, and 19.5% who were 65 years of age or older. The median age was 39 years. For every 100 females, there were 82.4 males. For every 100 females age 18 and over, there were 78.4 males.

The median income for a household in the city was $27,459, and the median income for a family was $37,219. Males had a median income of $30,400 versus $21,714 for females. The per capita income for the city was $16,751. About 12.7% of families and 18.9% of the population were below the poverty line, including 28.1% of those under age 18 and 17.1% of those age 65 or over.

== Transportation ==
=== Airport ===
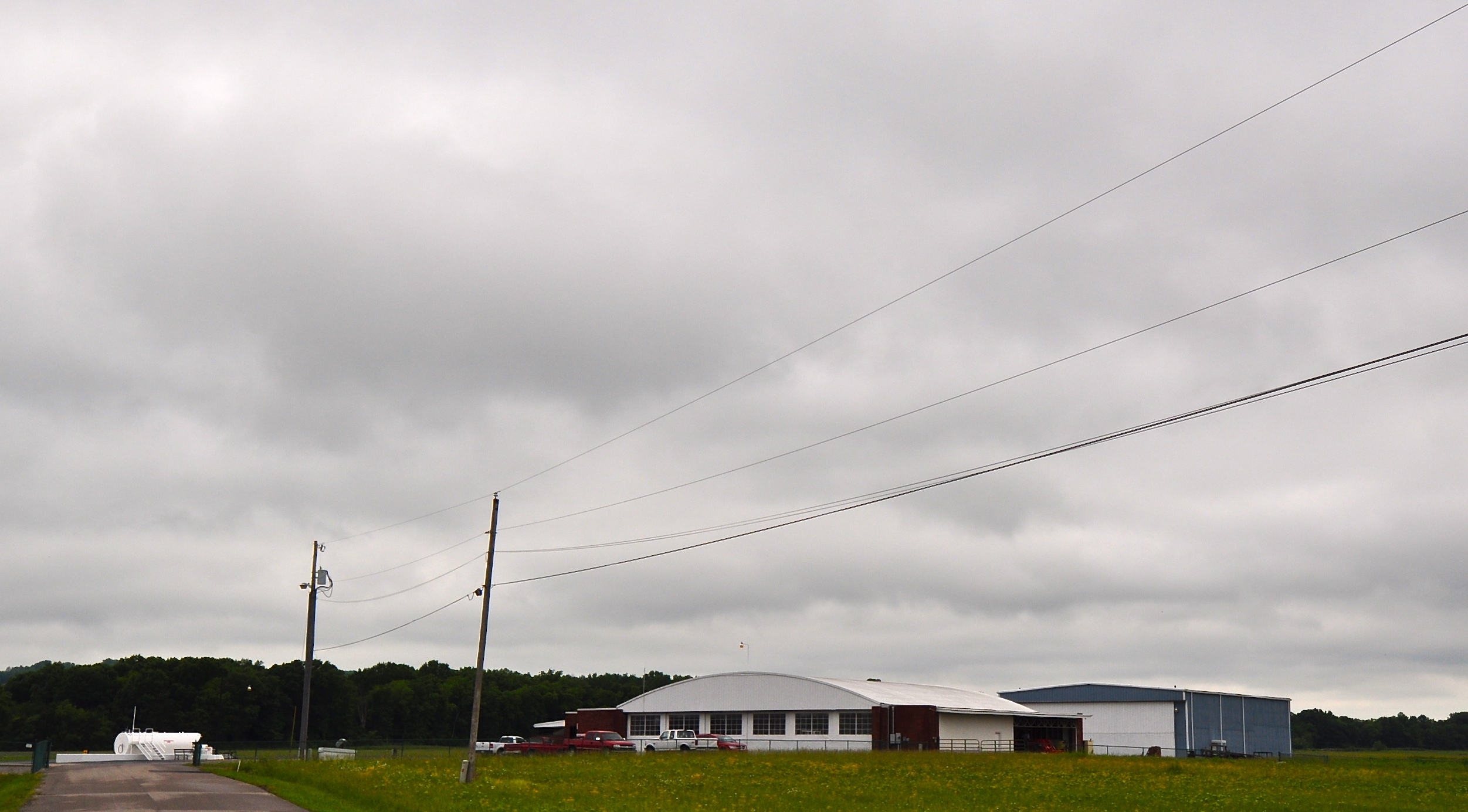
Abernathy Field, May 2014. ICAO Code: KGZS.

Abernathy Field is a public-use airport owned by the City of Pulaski and Giles County. It is located three nautical miles (6 km) southwest of the central business district of Pulaski.

== Media ==
=== Newspaper ===
The local newspaper is the Pulaski Citizen.

=== Radio ===
==== AM ====
- WKSR/1420: classic hits.

== Education ==
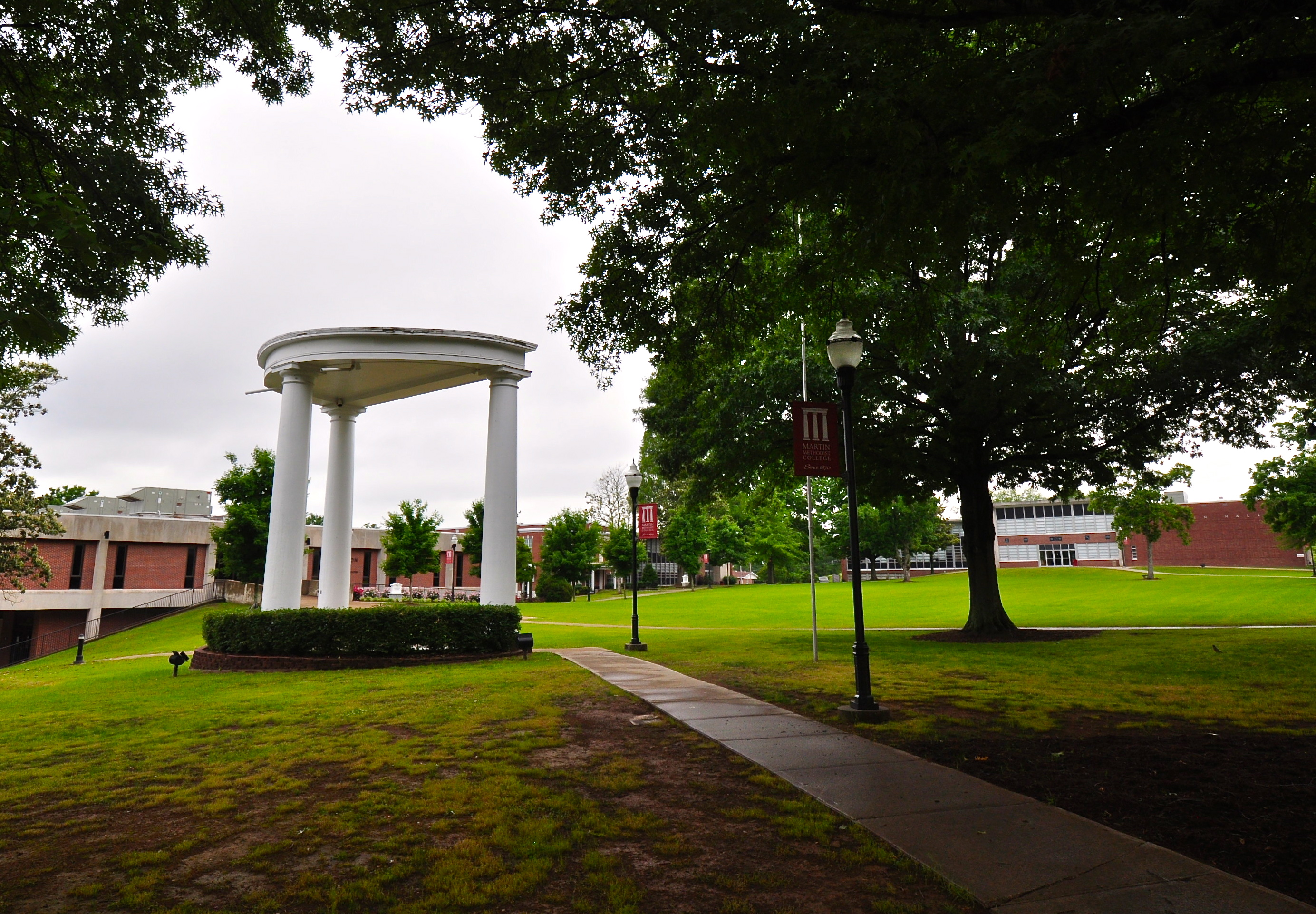
University of Tennessee Southern, May 2014

Pulaski is home to two high schools, Giles County High School and Richland High School (Lynnville). Pulaski is also home to Tennessee College of Applied Technology - Pulaski (TCAT) and to University of Tennessee Southern.

== Sports ==
In 1903, Pulaski was home to the Pulaski Baseball Club, an independent Minor League Baseball team that played in the Tennessee–Alabama League.

== Events ==
The Diana Singing, near Pulaski in Cornersville, is home of the semi-annual Diana Singing, sponsored by the Churches of Christ. The event attracts over 3,000 people to the area in June and September.

== Notable people ==
- Ross Bass, member of the United States Senate from Tennessee
- Keyes Beech, Pulitzer Prize-winning journalist; born in Pulaski
- Walter Beech, pioneer aviator, founder of Beech Aircraft and Travel Air Manufacturing; born in Pulaski
- Willa Eslick, first woman to represent Tennessee in the United States Congress
- Z. W. Ewing (1843–1909), state senator, lieutenant governor of Tennessee, Confederate officer
- Bobby Gordon, football player; born in Pulaski
- Moses McKissack III (1879–1952), African American architect, born and raised in Pulaski
- Wayne Peterson, longtime racecar driver and team owner in NASCAR and the ARCA Menards Series
- John Crowe Ransom, winner of National Book Award for poetry (1964); born in Pulaski
- William C. Rivers, US Army major general
- Tyler Smith, basketball player, University of Tennessee; played professionally in Europe
- Tim Turner, racing driver
- Bo Wallace, former University of Mississippi Rebels three-year starting quarterback
- David Wills, country music singer; born in Pulaski
- John Frank Wilson, Civil War officer, Arkansas and Arizona politician; born in Pulaski
- Doug Wolaver, horse trainer who won the Tennessee Walking Horse World Grand Championship three times

== In popular culture ==
The town was mentioned in the 1986 film Platoon by Chris Taylor, a character played by Charlie Sheen.
