= Pulaski Tennessee–Alabama League team =

Pulaski
- 1903; Pulaski, Tennessee

Minor league affiliations
- Class: Unclassified
- League: Tennessee–Alabama League

Major league affiliations
- Team: Unaffiliated

Minor league titles
- League titles (0): None

Team data
- Ballpark: Unknown

Pulaski was an independent Minor League Baseball team that played in the Tennessee–Alabama League in 1903. They were located in Pulaski, Tennessee, and bore no moniker.

The four-team Tennessee–Alabama League was to commence on August 10 and conclude on September 19 with 18 games scheduled in each city. Pulaski's season opener was played at home and resulted in only three innings being played before it was called on account of rain with Pulaski leading Columbia, 8–1. On September 13, Pulaski closed out the season on the road with an 8–5 win over Columbia. The season was called early after New Decatur lost several players and did not travel to Pulaski to play the final series.

Pulaski compiled a win–loss record of either 10–20 (.333) or 9–21 (.300), placing last either way, in its only season of competition.
