= Russellville Miners =

- 1921; Russellville, Alabama

Minor league affiliations
- Previous classes: Class D (1921)
- League: Alabama-Tennessee League (1921)

Major league affiliations
- Previous teams: None

Team data
- Previous names: Russellville Miners (1921)

The Russellville Miners were a Minor League Baseball team that represented Russellville, Alabama in the Alabama-Tennessee League in 1921.
