= Mark Johnson (catcher) =

American baseball player (born 1975)

Mark L. Johnson
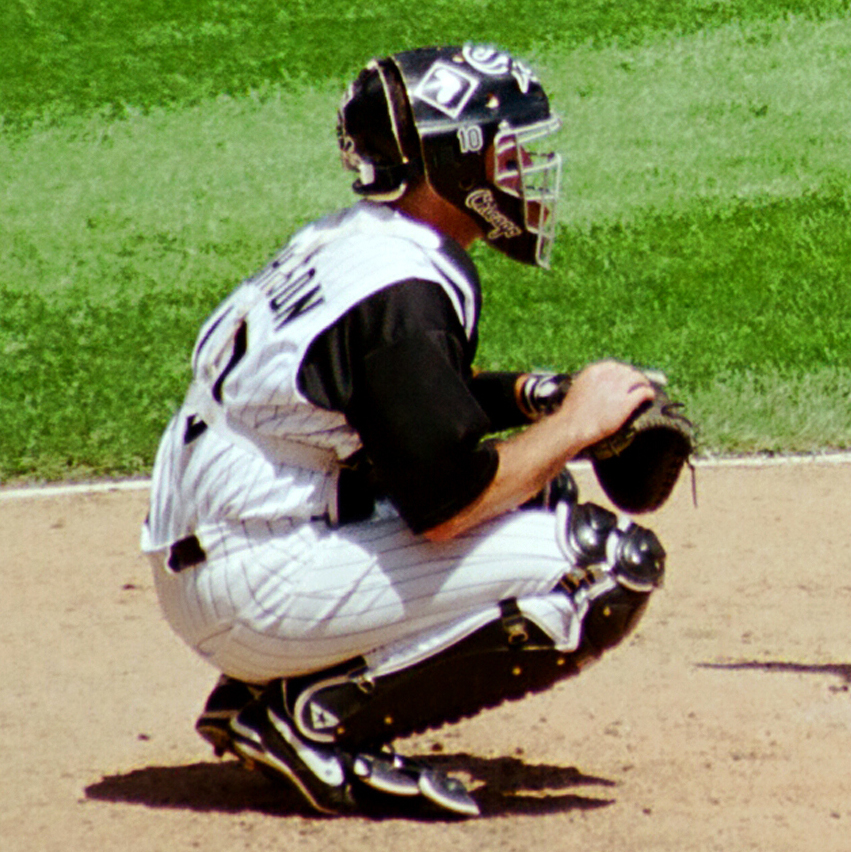
- Johnson with the White Sox in 1999
- Catcher
- Born: September 12, 1975 (age 50); Wheat Ridge, Colorado, U.S.
- Batted: Left Threw: Right

MLB debut
- September 14, 1998, for the Chicago White Sox

Last MLB appearance
- September 27, 2008, for the St. Louis Cardinals

MLB statistics
- Batting average: .218
- Home runs: 16
- Runs batted in: 83
- Stats at Baseball Reference

Teams
- Chicago White Sox (1998–2002); Oakland Athletics (2003); Milwaukee Brewers (2004); St. Louis Cardinals (2008)

Mark Landon Johnson (born September 12, 1975) is an American former professional baseball player, a catcher who played with several major league teams, but primarily with the Chicago White Sox. In 2011, he retired as a player and became a minor league manager. He is currently the catching coordinator for the Chicago Cubs. He previously managed the Cubs Double-A affiliate Tennessee Smokies.

== Amateur career ==
Johnson attended Warner Robins High School in Warner Robins, Georgia. Johnson was drafted by the Chicago White Sox 26th overall in the 1994 draft.

== Professional career ==
=== Chicago White Sox ===
In 1994, he hit only .241 in 32 games, and in 1995, he hit .182 in 107 games.

1996 saw a slight improvement, at least while in Single-A. He hit .257 in 67 games there, but in Single-A Advanced ball that year, he hit only .241.

Great at drawing walks, he walked 106 times and struck out only 85 times in 1997, but he still only hit .252. In 1998, he had a career year in the minors, batting .283 with 105 walks and only 72 strikeouts.

On September 14, 1998, he made his big league debut. He went 0-for-1 at the plate. The rest of his season he collected only two hits in 23 at bats, for a .087 batting average. Both of his hits were triples. His first one came off Pedro Martínez on September 19, and his second came off Scott Service on September 25.

He spent his entire 1999 season with the White Sox, backing up Brook Fordyce. In 73 games that season, he hit .227 with four home runs and 16 RBI.

He hit .225 in 2000, this time as the White Sox starting catcher. In 75 games, he hit three home runs with 23 RBI.

In 2001, he spent 55 games in the minors. In the majors, he hit .249 with 10 sacrifice hits-good for fourth most in the league.

He hit only .209 in 2002.

=== Oakland Athletics ===
On December 3, 2002, he was traded with Keith Foulke, Joe Valentine, and cash to the Oakland Athletics for Billy Koch and two players to be named later (who would end up being Neal Cotts and minor leaguer Daylan Holt).

He spent most of his season in the minors in 2003, hitting only .228. In the thirteen games that he played in the Majors, his batting average was .111.

=== Milwaukee Brewers ===
After the 2003 season, he was granted free agency and signed by the Milwaukee Brewers. He spent most of his time in the minors that year, hitting .259. In his time in the Majors he collected only one hit in eleven at bats, for a .097 batting average.

=== Chicago Cubs ===
After 2004, he was granted free-agency, but was re-signed by the Brewers, who then traded him to the Chicago Cubs for Travis Ezi. He spent 2005 entirely in the minors, hitting .266 in 60 games. After the 2005 season, he was granted free agency and picked up by the Brewers again. He spent all of 2006 in the minors, hitting only .203 there.

=== Arizona Diamondbacks ===
On November 10, 2006, he signed with the Arizona Diamondbacks and spent the entire year in the minors, with a .320 batting average.

=== St. Louis Cardinals ===
In December 2007, he signed a minor league contract with the St Louis Cardinals and was invited to their 2008 spring training, but did not make the team. He was called up by the Cardinals in September 2008, appearing in the majors for the first time in four years.

One source describes him as this: "He has decent gap power, resulting in his share of doubles, as well as a good eye at the plate. Defensively, he calls a good game and gets the ball quickly down to second base."

Although he has never quite lived up to the "gap power", he has obtained 123 walks and 195 strikeouts so far in his career. His career fielding percentage is .993.

That same source goes on to say this about him: "He has very little home run power and is a fairly light hitter on the whole -- even worse against southpaws."

He has averaged just over two home runs a season in the Majors, and his statistics – .217 batting average with 16 home runs and 81 RBI so far in his career. In November 2009 Johnson was granted free agency from the Chicago Cubs. On January 20, 2010, Johnson re-signed a minor league contract with the Cubs.

=== Minor league manager ===
In 2011, Johnson managed the Boise Hawks, the Cubs' affiliate in the Class A-Short Season Northwest League. In 2013, Johnson was named manager of the Kane County Cougars, the Class A affiliate of the Chicago Cubs. In 2015, Johnson was the manager of the Myrtle Beach Pelicans. He is currently manager of the Tennessee Smokies, an AA affiliate of the Cubs.

== Personal life ==
On November 17, 2001, Mark married spouse Jamie Suzanne Webster, in Warner Robins, Georgia.
