= Pulaski Citizen =

American newspaper in Tennessee

- Type: Weekly newspaper
- Founded: 1854
- Website: mainstreetmediatn.com/pulaski-citizen/

The Pulaski Citizen is a local newspaper serving Pulaski, Tennessee. It is currently available in both print and online editions. Between online and print editions, total circulation for the newspaper is listed at 3,500.

== History ==
The Pulaski Citizen was founded in 1854 as a four-page weekly. It has been in continuous publication since 1866.

In the years after the Civil War, the paper's editor was L.W. McCord, whose brother Frank McCord was a founding member of the Ku Klux Klan. During this period L.W. McCord feigned ignorance of what the Ku Klux Klan was, while simultaneously printing messages from them in the paper that he claimed to be mysteriously delivered. Subsequently, Laps D. McCord became the owner, passing it on to others in the McCord family after his death.

In 1892 the Citizen was purchased by a Nashville businessman, leaving the McCord family.
