= Anniston Inn Kitchen =

- U.S. National Register of Historic Places
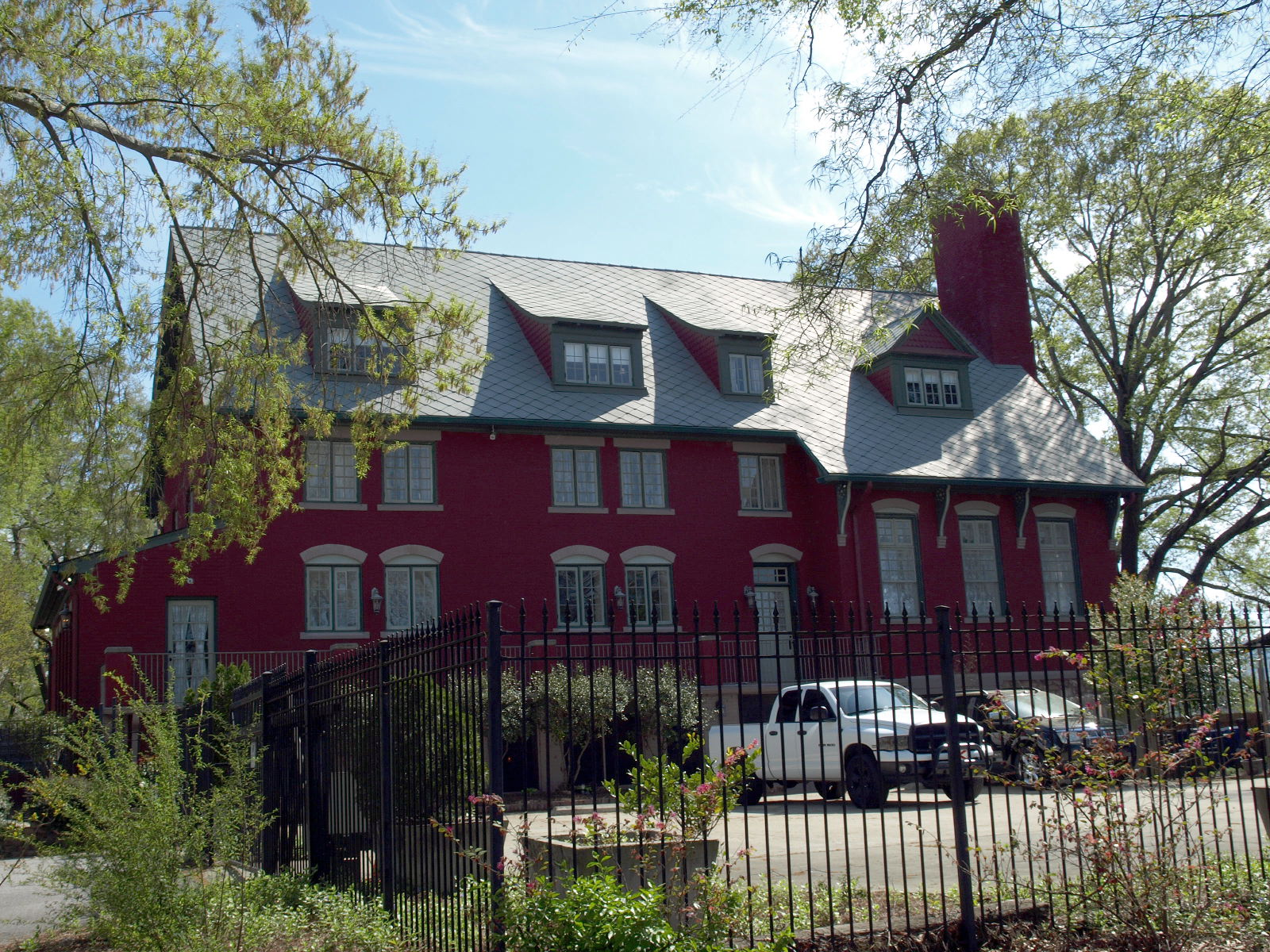
- The building in April 2014

- Location within Alabama Location within the United States
- Location: 130 W. 15th St., Anniston, Alabama
- Coordinates: 33°39′48″N 85°49′57″W
- Area: less than one acre
- Built: 1885
- NRHP reference No.: 73000332
- Added to NRHP: May 8, 1973

External image
- Photo of the Old Anniston Inn - kitchen at left

The Anniston Inn Kitchen is an event center in Anniston, Alabama, United States, and the only remaining portion of the Old Anniston Inn. The inn was built in 1885 as an upscale hotel for the planned company town. The majority of the inn burned on January 2, 1923, leaving only the portion containing the kitchen, children's dining room, and servants' living quarters.

The kitchen annex matches the original inn's Queen Anne style. The building is two-and-a-half stories tall, with dormer windows protruding from the half-story attic. A portion of the original veranda sits along the southeast part of the exterior. The west end is occupied by the main dining hall with 17-foot (5-meter) ceilings and exposed purlins and beams.

The building was listed on the National Register of Historic Places in 1973.
