= Bessemer Pipemakers =

- 1904–1912; (1904, 1912); Bessemer, Alabama

Minor league affiliations
- Previous classes: Class D
- League: Southeastern League (1912)
- Previous leagues: Tennessee–Alabama League (1904)

Team data
- Previous names: Bessemer Pipemakers (1912); Bessemer (1904)

The Bessemer Pipemakers were a Minor League Baseball team that represented the city of Bessemer, Alabama. They played in the Southeastern League in 1912. A previous team played in Bessemer in 1904 in the Tennessee–Alabama League.
