= Knoxville Indians =

- 1897; Knoxville, Tennessee

Minor league affiliations
- Class: Unclassified
- League: Southeastern League

Major league affiliations
- Team: Unaffiliated

Minor league titles
- Pennants (1): 1897

Team data
- Name: Knoxville Indians
- Ballpark: Baldwin Park

The Knoxville Indians were a Minor League Baseball team that played in the Southeastern League in 1897. They were located in Knoxville, Tennessee, and played their home games at Baldwin Park. The Indians were the first professional baseball team to hail from Knoxville.

They played their first game on April 19, 1897, losing to the Atlanta Crackers, 3–2. Knoxville won the next afternoon's game, shutting out Atlanta, 4–0. The league disbanded on May 29, 1897 due to poor patronage across the circuit. Knoxville played its final game on May 28, 1897, defeating the Asheville Moonshiners, 8–2. At the time of the disbandment, Knoxville held a 22–10 (.688) first-place record, making them the de facto pennant winners.

Knoxville did not field another club until the Knoxville Tennessee–Alabama League team began play in 1904.

== Notable players ==
Three Indians also played in at least one game in Major League Baseball during their careers. These players were:

- Davey Crockett
- Wiley Davis
- Jim Jones
