= Albany-Decatur Twins =

- 1921–1921; Decatur, Alabama

Minor league affiliations
- Previous classes: Class D (1921)
- League: Alabama-Tennessee League (1921)

Minor league titles
- League titles: 1

The Albany-Decatur Twins were a minor league baseball team that represented the cities of Albany, Alabama, and Decatur, Alabama. They played in the Alabama-Tennessee League during its one season of existence in 1921, winning the league championship.
