= Tri-Cities Triplets (Alabama–Tennessee League) =

- 1921–1921; Alabama

Minor league affiliations
- Previous classes: Class D
- League: Alabama-Tennessee League

The Tri-Cities Triplets were a Minor league baseball team that represented the cities of Muscle Shoals, Sheffield, and Tuscumbia from Alabama. They played in the Alabama-Tennessee League in 1921.
