= Alabama–Tennessee League =

- Sport: Baseball
- Founded: 1921
- Folded: 1921
- Country: United States
- Most titles: Albany-Decatur Twins (1)

The Alabama–Tennessee League was a Class D minor league baseball league which operated in the United States in 1921. Four teams from Alabama and Tennessee competed in the league. The Albany-Decatur Twins won the first half of the season, and the Russellville Miners won the second half. The two teams met in a championship series, which was won by Albany-Decatur, 5–1.

== Teams ==
- Albany-Decatur Twins
- Columbia Mules
- Russellville Miners
- Tri-Cities Triplets

== Standings ==
First Half
Team	Wins	Loses	Win%
Albany-Decatur Twins	32	22	.590
Tri-Cities Triplets	27	27	.500
Columbia Mules	25	27	.480
Russellville Miners	22	30	.423

Second Half
Team	Wins	Loses	Win%
Russellville Miners	19	17	.527
Albany-Decatur Twins	18	17	.514
Columbia Mules	17	19	.472
Tri-Cities Triplets	17	19	.472
