= Knoxville Tennessee–Alabama League team =

Knoxville
- 1904; Knoxville, Tennessee

Minor league affiliations
- Class: Unclassified
- League: Tennessee–Alabama League

Major league affiliations
- Team: Unaffiliated

Minor league titles
- Pennants (1): 1904

Team data
- Ballpark: Baldwin Park

Knoxville was an independent Minor League Baseball team that played in the Tennessee–Alabama League in 1904. They were located in Knoxville, Tennessee, and played their home games at Baldwin Park.

The team was preceded in Knoxville by the Knoxville Indians, who played in 1897. Knoxville played its first game in the Tennessee–Alabama League on May 16, 1904, defeating Chattanooga, 7–4. They defeated Bristol, 6–1, in the season finale on August 20. Knoxville won the pennant with a 49–29 (.628) first-place finish.

The city did not field another club until the Knoxville Appalachians began play in 1909.

== Notable players ==
The only Knoxville player to also compete in Major League Baseball during his career was Pryor McElveen, who played with the Brooklyn Superbas/Dodgers from 1909 to 1911.
