= Tom Stouch =

American baseball player (1869–1956)

- Second baseman
- Born: December 2, 1869; Perrysville, Ohio, U.S.
- Died: October 7, 1956 (aged 86); Lancaster, Pennsylvania, U.S.
- Batted: Right Threw: Right

MLB debut
- July 7, 1898, for the Louisville Colonels

Last MLB appearance
- July 27, 1898, for the Louisville Colonels

MLB statistics
- Batting average: .313
- Hits: 5
- Runs batted in: 6
- Stats at Baseball Reference

Teams
- Louisville Colonels (1898)

Thomas Carl Stouch (December 2, 1869 – October 7, 1956) was an American Major League Baseball second baseman who played four games with the Louisville Colonels of the National League in 1898. He is best known for "discovering" Shoeless Joe Jackson who played against him while Jackson was in a mill team in Greer, South Carolina in 1907.

== Playing career ==
Stouch was born in Perrysville, Ohio in 1869. His professional career started in the Texas League in 1892. He also played for a minor league team in Charleston in 1892. He moved on to Lancaster of the Pennsylvania State League in 1895. He moved around the Minors playing with four teams in 1896. He played in the New England League in 1897 and 1898 before landing a four-game stint with the Louisville Colonels in 1898. He had a .313 batting average, with 6 runs batted in in 16 at bats during his stint in the major leagues. He went back to the minor leagues playing in the Virginia League, the Atlanta Crackers of the Southern Association, and the Tennessee-Alabama League before becoming player-manager of the Greenville Spinners.

== Shoeless Joe Jackson ==
Stouch first discovered Jackson while playing an exhibition game against Jackson mill team in Greer, South Carolina in 1907. His team couldn't hold Jackson off the bases and Stouch made sure Jackson moved up the Minor Leagues. He got the chance to sign Jackson when he was offered the job of managing the Spinners in 1908. He quickly signed Jackson for $75 a month, more than Jackson made playing in the mill leagues. When the Philadelphia Athletics of the American League offered $900 for his contract, Stouch was the one who convinced Jackson who originally hesitated to play for the Athletics.

== Later career ==
Stouch was player-manager for the Greenville Spinners for four seasons from 1907 to 1912, with the exception of an eight-game stint with Augusta of the Sally League in 1911. He retired to Lancaster, where he died at the age of 86.
