= Tennessee–Alabama League =

Minor league baseball league active in 1904

- Sport: Minor league baseball
- Founded: 1904
- Folded: 1904
- Country: United States
- Most titles: Decatur (1)

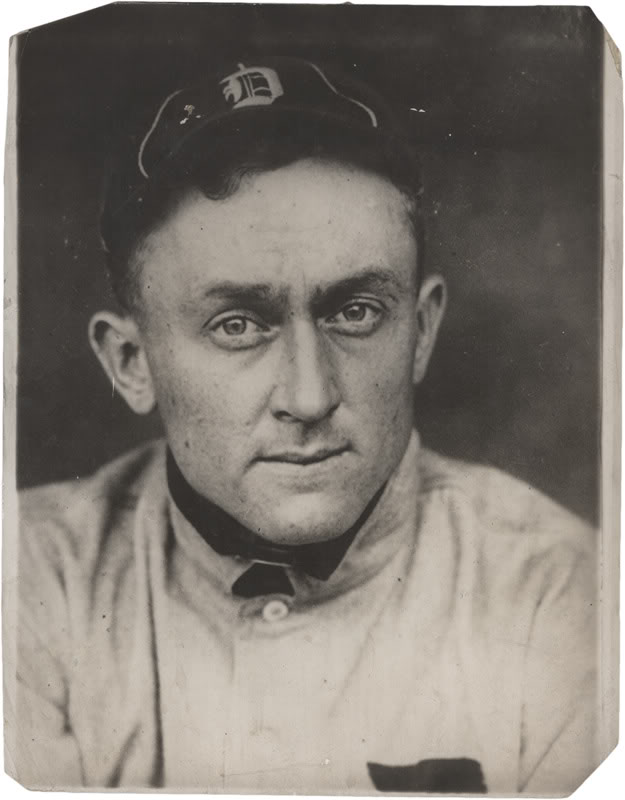
Ty Cobb played for the Anniston Baseball Club in 1904, his first professional season.

The Tennessee–Alabama League was an independent minor league baseball league which operated in the United States in 1904. Eight teams from Tennessee and Alabama competed in the league.

== Teams ==
A total of 8 teams competed in the Tennessee–Alabama League. Cities represented were:

- Anniston, Alabama: Anniston
- Bessemer, Alabama: Bessemer
- Chattanooga, Tennessee: Chattanooga
- Columbia, Tennessee: Columbia
- Decatur, Alabama: Decatur
- Huntsville, Alabama: Huntsville
- Knoxville, Tennessee: Knoxville
- Sheffield, Alabama: Sheffield

== Standings & statistics ==
1904 Tennessee–Alabama League

Team standings	W	L	PCT	GB	Managers
Decatur	52	31	.627	-	Tom Stouch
Knoxville	49	29	.628	0.5	Frank Moffett / Charles Akers
Columbia	51	34	.600	2.0	Ashby Wilkins
Huntsville	43	39	.524	8.5	William Watkins / William Prout
Chattanooga	39	41	.488	11.5	Miles Hightower
Sheffield	24	56	.300	26.5	E.W. Hutchcroft
Anniston	16	29	.356	NA	George Grove / L.L. Scarborough
Bessemer	15	30	.333	NA	Smith Eidge / Joe Burke

Anniston and Bessemer disbanded July 9

Player statistics
Player	Team	Stat	Tot	Player	Team	Stat	Tot
Frank Whittaker	Chattanooga	BA	.377	Parson Rodgers	Columbia	W	17
Schmidt	Columbia	Runs	50	Parson Rodgers	Columbia	SO	164
James	Columbia	Hits	89	L.C. Bailey	Decatur	ERA	0.38
W.C. Kyle	Knoxville	Hits	89	L.C. Bailey	Decatur	PCT	.833 10–2
W.C. Kyle	Knoxville	HR	5				

== Notable players ==
Five players from the league also played on Major League Baseball teams. They are:

- King Bailey (Columbia)
- Ty Cobb (Anniston)
- Jim Holmes (Huntsville)
- Pryor McElveen (Knoxville)
- Tom Stouch (Decatur)
