= Selma Cloverleafs (1928–1962) =

- 1928–1962; (1901, 1911–1914, 1927–1930, 1932, 1937–1941, 1946–1950, 1957–1962); Selma, Alabama

Minor league affiliations
- Class: Class B (1901); Class D (1911–1914); Class B (1927–1930, 1932, 1937–1941, 1946–1950); Class D (1957–1962)
- League: Southern Association (1901); Southeastern League (1911–1912); Cotton States League (1913); Georgia–Alabama League (1914); Southeastern League (1927–1930, 1932, 1937–1941, 1946–1950); Alabama–Florida League (1957–1962)

Major league affiliations
- Team: Boston Red Sox & Washington Senators (1937); Washington Senators (1940–1941); Pittsburgh Pirates (1946–1947); Chicago Cubs (1948–1949); New York Giants (1957); Kansas City Athletics (1958); Cleveland Indians (1959–1962)

Minor league titles
- League titles (5): 1914; 1930; 1959; 1961; 1962
- Conference titles (3): 1930; 1958; 1961
- Wild card berths (8): 1937; 1938; 1939; 1940; 1941; 1959; 1960; 1962

Team data
- Name: Selma Christians (1901); Selma Centralites (1911–1913); Selma River Rats (1914); Selma Selmians (1927); Selma Cloverleafs (1928–1930, 1932, 1937–1941, 1946–1950, 1957–1962)
- Ballpark: Riverside Park (1901, 1911–1914); Rowell Field (1927–1930, 1932, 1937–1941, 1946–1950); Bloch Park (1950, 1957–1962)

The Selma Cloverleafs were a minor league baseball team based in Selma, Alabama. Between 1928 and 1962, the Selma "Cloverleafs" played as a member of the Class B level Southeastern League and Class D level Alabama–Florida League, winning league championships in 1930, 1959, 1961 and 1962.

Earlier Selma teams played as members of the Southern Association (1901), Southeastern League (1911–1912), Cotton States League (1913) and Georgia–Alabama League (1914), with the Selma "River Rats" winning the 1914 Georgia–Alabama League championship.

The Selma Cloverleafs played as a minor league affiliate of the Boston Red Sox & Washington Senators (1937), Washington Senators (1940–1941), Pittsburgh Pirates (1946–1947),Chicago Cubs (1948–1949), New York Giants (1957), Kansas City Athletics (1958) and Cleveland Indians (1959–1962).

Selma first played home minor league games at Riverside Park through 1914 before playing at neighboring Rowell Field through 1950. Beginning in 1957, Selma hosted home games at Bloch Park in Selma. The three ballpark sites are adjacent to each other and all three are currently still in use.

In 2002, the Selma Cloverleafs nickname was revived after 40 years when a newly formed Selma Cloverleafs team played the season as members of the independent Southeastern League.

== History ==
=== 1901: First minor league team ===
Minor league baseball play began in Selma, Alabama in 1901, when the Selma "Christians" became a charter member of the eight-team Class B level Southern Association. Selma became a member of the league after the proposed Atlanta, Georgia franchise was unable to secure the funding for the 1901 season and were subsequently replaced by the Selma franchise.

When the Atlanta franchise failed to form for the 1901 Southern Association season, Selma became the replacement city. Abner Powell, who was one of the three founders of the Southern Association, invested in the Selma franchise along with Selma co-owner/manager Ed Peters. Powell also served as the manager of the New Orleans Franchise, of which he had a financial investment as well.

The Selma Christians joined the Birmingham Barons, Chattanooga Lookouts, Little Rock Travelers, Memphis Egyptians, Nashville Vols, New Orleans Pelicans and Shreveport Giants teams in beginning the league schedule on May 2, 1901.

Ed Glenn played for Selma in 1901. Glenn reported to the team early and helped in the preparation of the ballfield at Riverside Park that became Selma's new ballpark.

The Selma Christians ended their first season in last place in the Southern Association final standings. The Christians ended the season with a record of 37–78 to end the season in eighth place, playing the season under managers Ed Peters and Bob Pender. No playoffs were held and Selma finished 31½ games behind the first place Nashville Volunteers.

Selma did not return to play in the 1902 Southern League, replaced in the eight-team league by the Atlanta Crackers. This occurred when Abner Powell bought out Ed Peters and moved the Selma franchise to Atlanta for the 1902 season. Ed Peters remained as manager when the 1902 team became based in Atlanta.

In 1903, a Selma YMCA team played the season as members of the four-team independent Alabama-Georgia League. The Selma roster consisted of mostly local players.

=== 1911 & 1912: Southeastern League ===
After an eight-year absence, minor league baseball returned to Selma in 1911. The newly formed Selma "Centralites" became members of the six-team Class D level Southeastern League. The Selma Centralites joined the Anniston Models, Decatur Twins, Gadsden Steel Makers, Huntsville Westerns and Rome Hillies teams in beginning the Southeastern League schedule on May 8, 1911.

In their first season of Southeastern League play, Selma ended the season in third place. Ending the season with a record of 53–51, Selma finished 13½ games behind the first place Anniston Models and 9.0 games behind second place Gadsden. Selma played the season managed by Bill May, C.L. Howell, Frank Anderson and Ralph Savidge. No post-season playoffs were held.

The Selma Centralites continued Southeastern League play in 1912 in their second season of play in the six-team Class D level league. The six-team league lost two teams during the season and ultimately disbanded before completing the season schedule. The Bessemer Pipemakers folded on July 14, 1912, and the Anniston Models folded on July 19, 1912, leaving the league with four remaining teams. The league began a split-season schedule on July 22 before folding folded on August 2, 1912. In the second half, Selma had compiled a record of 5–6. When the Southeastern League folded, Selma ended their season with an overall record of 42–35. Their record put the team in second place in the overall standings, finishing 1½ games behind the first place Gadsden Steel Makers. Selma played their shortened season under manager Link Stickney. Earl Hanna of Selma won the Southeastern League batting championship, hitting .345 on the season. Besides winning the batting title, Hanna also led the Southeastern League with 62 runs scored and 115 total hits.

After folding before completing the 1912 season, the Southeastern League did not return to play in 1913.

=== 1913: Cotton States League ===
With the Southeastern League folded, the 1913 Selma Centralites continued minor league play in a new league. The Centralites played the season as members of the six-team Class D level Cotton States League. Selma replaced the Greenwood Scouts franchise in the Cotton States League. The Clarksdale Swamp Angels, Columbus Joy Riders, Jackson Lawmakers, Meridian Metropolitans and Pensacola Snappers teams joined with Selma as the league schedule began on April 10, 1913.

On June 2, 1913, Selma pitcher Slim Love threw a No-hitter victory over the Jackson Lawmakers, the first for the Selma franchise. Love won the game 2–0 and recorded 2 walks and 6 strikeouts in the contest. Love's no hit game was part of a five-game streak in which he allowed 0 runs and 19 hits in the five games. In July 1913, Love left Selma during the season, acquired by the Atlanta Crackers of the Southern Association.

In their only season of Cotton States League play, the Centralites ended the season in third place in another shortened season. The season schedule was shortened to August 15 and Salem ended the season with a record of 49–46 on the date the league ended play. The Centralites played the season under managers Arthur Riggs and Harry Spratt, finishing 22.0 games behind the first place Jackson Lawmakers. No Playoffs were held in she abbreviated season.

The Cotton States League folded after the 1913 season and next returned to play in 1922 without Selma as a member.

=== 1914: Georgia–Alabama League championship ===
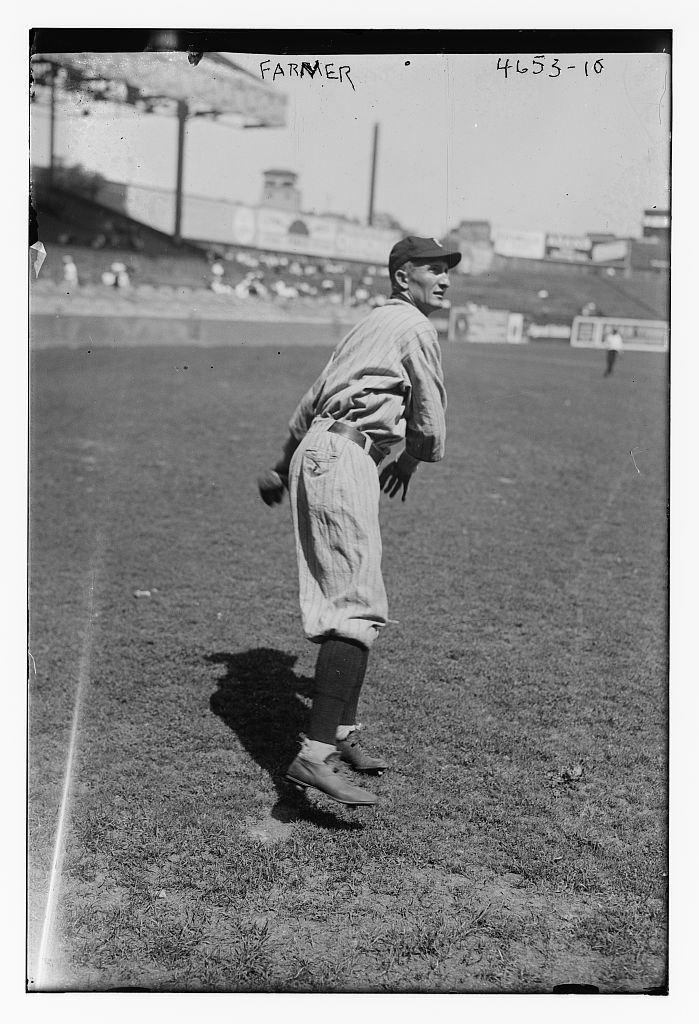
(1918) Jack Farmer. Cleveland Indians. Farmer played for Selma in 1914, batting .302 as the River Rats were the Georgia–Alabama League champions.

The Selma team won a league championship in 1914 as the franchise continued play with a new nickname in a new league. The Selma "River Rats" became members of the 1914 Georgia–Alabama League. The Class D level league expanded from a six-team league to an eight-team league, adding Selma and the Rome Romans as expansion teams. With Salem and Rome joining the returning Anniston Moulders, Gadsden Steel Makers, LaGrange Terrapins, Newnan Cowetas and Talladega Indians teams, the league schedule began on May 4, 1914.

Jack Farmer played as a member of Selma River Rats in 1914, his first professional baseball season. Farmer had just graduated from Cumberland University in May 1914 and played on the Cumberland baseball team that spring. He also played football at Cumberland. Farmer batted .302 in 69 games for Selma and was considered the best second basemen in the Georgia–Alabama League. Farmer made his major league debut with the Pittsburgh Pirates in 1916. There he formed a double play combination with Baseball Hall of Fame charter member Honus Wagner.

The Selma River Rats won the 1914 Georgia–Alabama League championship, playing the season under the returning manager Arthur Riggs and Wilfred Guiterez. Selma ended the season with a record of 60–35 record and finished 3.0 games ahead of the second place Newnan Cowetas in the final standings of the eight-team league. No league Georgia–Alabama playoff was held in 1914.

Despite being the defending league champions from the prior season, the Salem franchise did not return to the 1915 Georgia–Alabama League. The league dropped both Selma and the Opelika Pelicans in becoming a six-team league. Selma would not host minor league baseball again until 1927.

=== 1927: Return to Southeastern League ===
After a thirteen-year absence, minor league baseball returned to Selma in 1927, when the Selma "Selmians" became members of the eight-team Class B level Southeastern League. Selma and the Pensacola Pilots were expansion teams in 1927, as the Southeastern League expanded from a six-team league to an eight-team league. Salem and Pensacola joined the returning Albany Nuts, Columbus Foxes, Jacksonville Tars, Montgomery Lions, Savannah Indians and St. Augustine Saints franchises in beginning Southeastern League play on May 3, 1927.

When Selma applied for membership in the Southeastern League in 1927, a new ballpark had to be constructed to host the team and Rowell Field was opened. Selma had to convince the other Southeastern League teams that, despite being a much smaller city than the other league members, it could support a team. Selma's home attendance was near the top of the league when it reformed.

In their return to play the 1927 Selma Selmians finished the season in last place. Playing in the eight-team 1927 Southeastern League, the Selmians ended season with a record of 65–88 and in eighth place. Playing the season under managers Fred Graf (18–36) and Dutch Hoffman (47–52), Selma finished 25.0 games behind the first place Jacksonville Tars in the final standings. No Southeastern League playoffs were held.

=== 1928 to 1932: Selma Cloverleafs / Southeastern League ===
The 1928 season saw the team play as the Selma "Cloverleafs" for the first time. The Cloverleafs continued play as members of the eight-team Class B level Southeastern League. On April 11, 1928, Selma played their home opener at Rowell Field against the Montgomery Lions. Tickets were .75 cents and .50 cents.

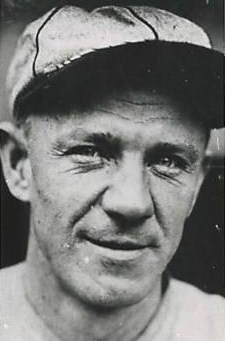
(1916) Zinn Beck, St. Louis Cardinals. A Selma native, Beck managed the Selma Cloverleafs from 1928 to 1930, leading the team to the 1930 championship.

For the 1928 season, Polly McLarry accepted his first managerial position and began the season as the Selma player-manager. After the Cloverleafs had compiled a 18–30 record and were in last-place, McLarry resigned in June, 1928. McLarry the joined the Meridian Mets of the Class D Cotton States League as a player, before he was released in August.

Zinn Beck replaced McLarry as manager during the 1928 season. Zinn was a Selma native who joined his hometown Cloverleafs in 1928 after beginning the season as manager of another team. In 1927, Beck was player/manager of the Portsmouth Truckers and led the team to the Virginia League championship. Beck began the 1928 season as manager the Norfolk Tars and became available when the Virginia League folded in June, 1928. He then joined Selma and replaced Polly McLarry for the last part of the 1928 season and returned for the 1929 and 1930 seasons. Zinn Beck Field at Sanford Memorial Stadium in Sanford, Florida is named in his honor. In 1978, Beck was the recipient of the King of Baseball award from Minor League Baseball.

The 1928 Selma Cloverleafs ended the season in last place as two teams folded from the Southeastern League during the season. The Albany Nuts and Savannah Indians teams both folded on August 12, 1928, and the league completed the season with the six remaining teams, Salem included. Selma ended the season with a record of 59–83. The team finished in sixth place, managed by McLarry and Beck, finishing 31.0 games behind the first place Pensacola Fliers in the overall standings. The Southeastern League adopted a split-season schedule, with Pensacola winning the first half of the schedule and the second place Montgomery Lions capturing the second half schedule pennant. In the playoff, Montgomery defeated Pensacola. Parker Perry, who began the season as a member of the Albany Nuts before joining Selma, led the Southeastern League with 118 RBIs.

The Selma Cloverleafs improved in the standings and ended 1929 as the Southeastern League runner-up in a split season schedule. Selma hurler William Ferebee threw the second Selma franchise No-hitter on June 10, 1929. In a 6–0 victory at Selma over the Jacksonville Tars, Ferebee recorded 3 walks and 3 strikeouts in the game.

Selma continued play in the six-team Class B level Southeastern League and ended the 1929 season with a record of 77–60, finishing in second place in the overall standings. Managed by the returning Zinn Beck, the Cloverleafs finished 3.0 games behind the first place Tampa Smokers. Despite their second-place overall finish, Selma did not qualify for the playoff as the third place Montgomery Lions won the first half pennant and Tampa won the second half pennant. In the playoff final, Montgomery defeated Tampa in seven games. Parker Perry remained with Selma and led the Southeastern League with both 12 home runs and 107 RBIs.

Selma had strong home attendance in the Southeastern League, despite being a smaller city than the other league members.

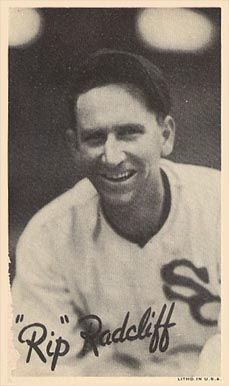
(1936) Rip Radcliff, Chicago White Sox. Ratcliff won the Triple Crown playing for the 1930 Selma Cloverleafs. Ratcliff became a major league all-star and retired with a career .311 batting average.

With manager Zinn Beck returning, Selma Cloverleafs won the 1930 Southeastern League championship, aided by a notable season from Rip Radcliff. The Cloverleafs had a final record of 94–43 to finish in first place under manager Zinn Beck. No Southeastern League playoffs were held, as Selma won both halves of the league's split season schedule, negating an opponent for a playoff. Selma finished 21½ games ahead of the second place Tampa Bay Smokers in the final overall standings of the six-team Class B level league. Selma's Rip Radcliff won the Southeastern League Triple Crown. Radcliff batted .369 with 15 home runs and 116 RBIs, leading the Southeastern League in all three categories. He also had a league leading 199 total hits. Selma pitcher Henry Brewer won 25 games to lead the Southeastern League. Leo Mackey of Selma compiled a 14–2 record and led the league with a .875 winning percentage.

Rip Radcliff later started in left field in the 1936 Major League Baseball All-Star Game. In his ten-year major league career with the Chicago White Sox (1934–1939), St. Louis Browns (1940–1941) and Detroit Tigers (1941–1943), Radcliff had a .311 batting average with 42 home runs and 533 RBIs. His career numbers included a .362 on-base percentage and .417 slugging percentage. Defensively, he played left field, right field and first base during his career.

With the Great Depression affecting minor leagues, the Southeastern League did not return to play in 1931, and the Selma Cloverleafs were unable to defend their championship.

In 1932, the Southeastern League reformed and the Selma Cloverleafs returned as a member of the six-team Class B level league. The Salem Cloverleafs joined the Columbus Foxes, Jackson Senators, Macon Peaches, Mobile Red Warriors and Montgomery Capitals teams as the league returned to play on April 19, 1932. However, the season would be short lived.

The 1932 Southeastern League season was short as the league disbanded on May 21, 1932. Folding after 32 games, the Selma Cloverleafs had a 16–16 record at the time the league folded. Selma ended the season in third place, playing under manager Art Phelan. The Cloverleafs finished 3.0 games behind the first place Mobile Red Warriors (19–13) when the league folded. In the shortened season, Selma's Robert Schleischer captured the Southeastern League batting title, hitting .398.

During the 1932 season, after the Southeastern League folded on May 21, 1932, numerous other minor leagues also folded before completing the season, as 5 of 19 minor leagues did not complete the season. The Interstate League folded on June 20, the Cotton States League folded on July 13, the Illinois–Indiana–Iowa League folded on July 14 and the Arizona-Texas League folded on July 24.

The Southeastern League did not return to play in 1933 as the Great Depression continued. After a four-season hiatus, the Southeastern League reformed for the 1937 season with Selma as a member.

=== 1937 to 1941: Southeastern League ===
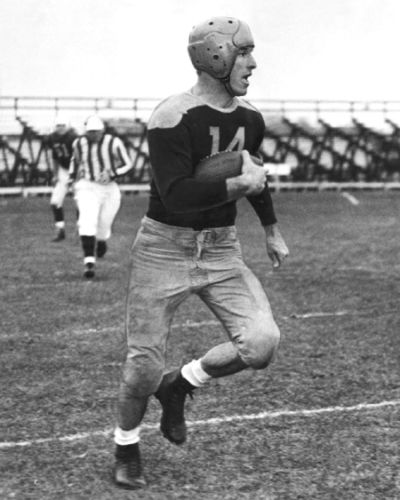
(1935) Don Hutson, Green Bay Packers. Hutson played for Selma in 1937, while also playing for the NFL Champion Packers. It was the final baseball season for Hutson. He was inducted into the Pro Football Hall of Fame in 1963.

The Selma Cloverleafs returned to play minor league in 1937, as the Southeastern League reformed as a Class B level league. In the league's return to play, Selma became a minor league affiliate for the first time, becoming an affiliate of the Boston Red Sox & Washington Senators for the season. Selma joined the Mobile Shippers (St. Louis Cardinals affiliate), Jackson Senators (New York Yankees), Meridian Scrappers (St. Louis Browns), Montgomery Bombers (Cleveland Indians) and Pensacola Pilots teams in the reformed league. The league schedule began on April 15, 1937.

Pro Football Hall of Fame member Don Hutson played for Selma in 1937 while also playing for the Green Bay Packers and leading the National Football League in receptions that season. Green Bay had just won the 1936 NFL championship and Hutson played baseball before joining the Packers for the 1937 season. At age 24, Hutson played his second and final season of professional baseball in 1937. Hutson had played for his hometown Pine Bluff Judges in 1936. After the 1937 season, he returned exclusively to football. Hutson played ten seasons with the Green Bay Packers and was elected to the Pro Football Hall of Fame in 1963.

In returning to the eight-team Southeastern League, The Cloverleafs finished in second place, as the league began a four-team playoff system in 1937. Selma completed the regular season with 78–57 record in the 1937 Southeastern League. Playing the season under manager Babe Ganzel, the Cloverleafs ended the season 5.0 games behind the first place Pensacola Fliers in the final regular season standings. Selma qualified for the four-team playoffs with their second-place finish and subsequently lost in first round of the playoffs 3 games to 1 to the eventual champion Mobile Shippers. Everette Grossman of Selma led the Southeastern League with a 2.08 ERA.

Selma did not have an affiliate for the 1938 Southeastern League season, and the Cloverleafs ended play with another second-place finish as the league expanded to become eight-team Class B level league. The Anniston Rams and Gadsden Pilots were the two expansion teams added for the 1938 season. On August 14, 1938, in the second game of a doubleheader at home, Selma pitcher Ralph Braun threw the Selma franchise's third No-hitter in a win over the Pensacola Pilots. Braun was the winning pitcher as Selma won the game 2–0, as Braun recorded 3 walks and 8 strikeouts in the contest.

Selma ended the 1938 Southeastern League season with a record of 83–62, playing the season under manager Ivy Griffin. The Cloverleafs ended the season 10½ games behind the first place Pensacola Fliers in the final standings. With their second place finish the Cloverleafs qualified for the four-team playoffs. In the first round of the playoffs, Selma defeated the Jackson Senators 4 games to 3. Selma then lost in the league finals, as the Mobile Shippers, who finished fourth in the regular season standings defeated the Cloverleafs in Game 7 of the series to win the league championship 4 games to 3. Selma's Art Luce scored a league leading 119 runs. Selma pitcher John Burrows had 187 strikeouts to lead the Southeastern League, while his Cloverleaf teammate Julian Tubb had a 1.96 ERA to lead the league.

The Selma Cloverleafs continued Southeastern League play in 1939 and again qualified for the playoffs, as the league played again as eight-team Class B level league. Selma ended the regular season with a record 68–66 and finished in fourth place. Playing the season under player-manager Billy Bancroft the Cloverleafs ended the season 18½ games behind first place Pensacola Fliers. With their fourth-place finish, Selma qualified for the four-team playoffs and lost in first round, being swept by eventual champion Pensacola in 4 games.

Selma manager Billy Bancroft was still playing minor league baseball while serving as a college football coach in 1939. In 1935, Bancroft began serving as the head football, baseball and basketball coach for the Howard College teams. Today, Howard is known as Samford University. A 1928 graduate of Howard, Bancroft coached Howard football in the fall of 1939 after his season with Selma ended. In 1940 he served at athletic director in his final year at Howard. He later became a high school teacher and coach. As a pinch hitter for Selma in his dual role with the 1939 team, Bancroft batted .235 in 11 games and 21 at-bats, playing at age 34.

The Selma Cloverleafs continued play in the 1940 eight-team Class B level Southeastern League and again qualified for the playoffs. Selma became a minor league affiliate of the Washington Senators in 1940 ended the season in fourth place. The Cloverleafs ended the season with a 72–77 record under manager Wes Kingdon. Selma finished the regular season 19.0 games behind the first place Jackson Senators. With their fourth place regular season finish, Selma qualified for the four-team playoffs and lost in first round 4 games to 1 to eventual champion Jackson. Ted Mueller of Selma won the Southeastern League batting title, hitting .346 on the season.

For the 1941 season, Dale Alexander, was hired to become the player-manager for Selma. Prior to his arrival in Selma, Alexander was the player-manager for the 1939 Sanford Lookouts of the Florida State League and held the same role with the 1940 Thomasville Tourists. In 1929, as a rookie with the Detroit Tigers, Alexander led the American League with 215 total hits, and had a total of 272 RBIs in his first two major league seasons. In 1932, while playing for the Boston Red Sox, Alexander won the American League batting championship, hitting .367 and winning the title over Baseball Hall of Fame member Jimmie Foxx (.364) of the Philadelphia Athletics. After winning the batting title, Boston raised his salary by a total of $500, from $10,500 to $11,000. In May 1933, Alexander received third degree burns on his leg and developed gangrene after receiving a diathermy treatment on an injured knee. The injuries from the burns and infection permanently limited his mobility as a 6'3" 210 pound first baseman and essentially ended his major league career. After the injury, Alexander continued his playing career in the minor leagues and would compile a .334 batting average with 2,145 hits and 1,171 RBIs in minor league play through his final 1942 season. In 1938, Alexander played for the Chattanooga Lookouts in the Southern Association, when was traded by Chattanooga to the Dallas Steers but refused to report to Dallas and temporarily retired before resuming his career the player-manager position with Sanford. Alexander became manager of the Greeneville Burley Cubs in 1942.

Selma improved to end the 1941 season as the runner-up in the eight-team Southeastern League final standings. The Cloverleafs finished in second place under manager Dale Alexander, with a 80–57 record as the team continued as a Washington Senators affiliate. Selma ended the regular season 9.0 games behind the first place Mobile Shippers. Selma qualified for the four-team playoffs and lost in first round 4 games to 1 to the Jackson Senators who had finished the regular season in third place. Mobile then swept Jackson in the final. In part-time play at age 38, manager Dale Alexander had career-high .438 batting average in 56 games and 64 at bats, serving as a pinch-hitter for the Cloverleafs. Selma pitcher Ray Scarborough led the Southeastern League with both 21 wins and 220 strikeouts.

In 1942 with World War II emerging the Southeastern League reduced to six teams, dropping the Selma Cloverleafs and Jackson Senators teams. After the conclusion of the 1942 season, the league did not resume play until 1946.

=== 1946 to 1950: Southeastern League ===
The Southeastern League and Selma Cloverleafs resumed play in 1946, following the conclusion of World War II. Selma became an affiliate of the Pittsburgh Pirates in returning to minor league play. The eight team league was classified as a Class B level league in its return to play. Salem joined with the Anniston Rams (Pittsburgh Pirates affiliate), Gadsden Pilots, Jackson Senators (Boston Braves), Meridian Peps (Brooklyn Dodgers), Montgomery Rebels, Pensacola Fliers (Washington Senators and Vicksburg Billies teams in resuming league play on April 12, 1946. Salem and Anniston both played the league season as Pittsburgh affiliates.

On June 5, 1946, Selma pitcher Richard Piatnek threw a no hit game on the road. It was the fourth Selma no-hitter and came in a 5–1 victory against the Jackson Senators. Piatnek issued 2 walks and 8 strikeouts in the game, which was held at Jackson.

In their return to Southeastern League play, Selma did not qualify for the playoffs in 1946, as the league post season consisted of a four-team playoff and the Cloverleafs did not end the regular season as a top four team. The Cloverleafs ended the 1946 season in seventh place in the eight-team league. With a 60–77 record, playing under manager Frank Oceak, Selma finished 27.0 games behind the first place Pensacola Fliers in the final regular season standings. Selma did not qualify for the four-team playoffs, which were won by Anniston. Selma pitcher Richard Piatnek led the Southeastern League hurlers with 160 strikeouts.

Carl Fischer began the 1947 season as the Selma manager and left the team after compiling a 9–16 record. A left-handed pitcher, Fischer then ended the season pitching with the league rival Pensacola Fliers, in what would be his final professional season at age 41. Fischer pitched for six teams in seven years of major league baseball between 1930 and 1937. He played for the Chicago White Sox, Washington Senators, Cleveland Indians, Detroit Tigers and St. Louis Browns, and was a member of the 1935 World Series Champion Detroit Tigers. He appeared in 191 major league games and compiling a record of 46–50, with a 4.63 ERA and 376 strikeouts in 823 innings pitched.

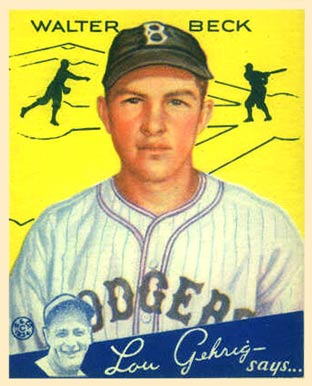
(1934) Boom-Boom Beck, Brooklyn Dodgers. Beck was a player-manager for the 1947 Cloverleafs.

Fischer was replaced during the 1947 season as the Selma manager by Boom Boom Beck. After making his major league debut in 1924, Beck had pitched in the major leagues through the 1945 season winning 38 career games against 69 losses. In 1946, Beck was a player-manager for the York White Roses, who were a Pittsburgh Pirate affiliate. Beck compiled a record of 55–60 as the Selma manager. He had a 3–2 record with a 4.15 ERA pitching in 15 games for Selma. Beck later became a pitching coach for the Washington Senators from 1957 to 1959. He then worked as a minor league pitching instructor for the Milwaukee Braves in 1960 and 1961 before retiring from baseball.

Playing the season under Fischer and Beck, Selma did not qualify for the Southeastern League post season in 1947. With the team becoming a minor league affiliate of the Pittsburgh Pirates, the Cloverleafs ended the season with a record of 64–76 to finish in seventh place. Carl Fischer had record of 9–16 in his tenure and the team was 55–60 while playing under Boom-Boom Beck. Salem finished 13½ games behind the first place Jackson Senators in the final regular season standidngs. With their seventh-place finish, Salem did not qualify for the four-team Southeastern League playoffs won by the Montgomery Rebels.

Morrie Arnovich was named as the Cloverleafs' manager for the 1948 season, as the Selma franchise became a Chicago Cubs minor league affiliate. In 1947, Arnovich had managed the Davenport Cubs, another Chicago Cubs affiliate. In his major league playing career with the Philadelphia Phillies, Cincinnati Reds and New York Giants, Arnovich played in 590 games over seven seasons, his career interrupted by four years of military service during World War II with the U.S. Army. Arnovich volunteered for the United States Army, after Pearl Harbor in 1942, serving as a staff sergeant for the Army in the Pacific Theater of Operations. In his major league playing career, Arnovich posted a .287 batting average with 22 home runs, 261 RBIs, 17 stolen bases and 185 base on balls. He also had a .350 on-base percentage and .383 slugging percentage. Defensively, he recorded a .981 fielding percentage while playing primarily at left field.

Continuing play in the 1948 Southeastern League, the Cloverleafs finished in last place in the Southeastern League after becoming a Chicago Cubs minor league affiliate. Salem ended the season with a record of 52–88, to finish in eighth place in the eight-team league. Whit manager Morrie Arnovich completing the season with the team, Salem ended the season 34½ games behind the first place Montgomery Rebels. Salem did not qualify for the four-team playoffs won by Montgomery. In his final season as a player, manager Morrie Arnovich batted .353 for Selma in 41 at bats.

After finishing in last place the season prior, Selma ended the 1949 Southeastern League season avoiding last place in their final season as a Chicago Cubs affiliate. Salem was managed in 1949 by managers Leo Twardy (24–25) and Joseph Szuch (35–51) and finished with a record of 59–76. The Cloverleafs ended the regular season in seventh place, finishing 36½ games behind the first place Pensacola Fliers. Selma did not qualify for the four-team Southeastern League playoffs won by Pensacola.

At age 45, Cloverleafs pitcher Roy Walker played in his final season of professional baseball in 1949. Walker compiled a 4–8 record pitching for Selma, throwing 123 innings in 23 appearances. Walker began his minor league career with the 1924 Birmingham Barons and won 224 games over 20 minor league seasons.

Continuing Southeastern League play in 1950 without a minor league affiliate, the Cloverleafs again missed the four-team playoffs after finishing in last place. During the Southeastern League season the league reduced from four teams to six teams as both the Gadsden Pilots and Anniston Rams teams folded between July 25 and August 1. With the league ending the season six teams, the Cloverleafs finished in sixth place. Selma ended the season with a record of 43–87, playing the season under manager Bert Niehoff, finishing 37.0 games behind the first place Pensacola Fliers. Selam did not qualify for the four-team playoffs won by Pensacola.

The Southeastern League folded following the 1950 season and did not return to play in 1951. Selma, Alabama was without a minor league team for the next six seasons.

=== 1957 to 1962: Three Alabama–Florida League championships ===
The Selma Cloverleafs returned to minor league play in 1957. Selma became a New York Giants minor league affiliate, and joined as members of the six-team Class D level Alabama–Florida League. The Salem franchise replaced the Crestview Braves team in the league. Salem joined with the Fort Walton Beach Jets (Washington Senators affiliate), Graceville Oilers (Cincinnati Redlegs), Montgomery Rebels (Detroit Tigers), Panama City Fliers and Pensacola Dons teams in beginning league play on April 25, 1957.

At age 34, Buddy Kerr was hired to manage Selma in 1957 one year after making his managerial debut with the Cocoa Indians in 1956. Growing up in New York City, New York less than a mile from The Polo Grounds, Kerr became the starting shortstop for the New York Giants for seven seasons during his career and was a greatly supported by the Giants' owner Horace Stoneham. After his major league playing career ended, Kerr managed in the minor leagues for New York and San Francisco Giants affiliated teams through 1963. He then became scout for the San Francisco Giants in 1964 and signed John Montefusco among others.

In their first season of play in the Alabama–Florida League, Selma ended the 1957 season in last place. The Cloverleafs ended their first season in the new league with a final record of 55–65. Ending the season in sixth place in the six-team league, the Cloverleafs were managed by Buddy Kerr and finished 13.0 games behind the first place Montgomery Rebels in the final regular season standings. With their sixth-place finish, Selma did not qualify for the four-team Alabama–Florida League playoffs. The playoffs ended in a tie between Graceville and Panama City after weather ended the series tied at 3 games each.

In their second season, the Salem Cloverleafs became a Kansas City Athletics minor league affiliate went from last place to first place as the Cloverleafs won the 1958 Alabama–Florida League pennant. Led by manager Tommy Giordano, the Cloverleafs ended the regular season with a record of 71–49 and in first place, finishing percentage points ahead of the second place Columbus Foxes (74–52) in the final standings. After winning the league pennant, Selma qualified for the four-team playoffs and subsequently defeated the Pensacola Dons 3 games to 2 in the first round. In the Alabama–Florida League championship series, Selma lost 4 games to 1 to the Dothan Cardinals, who had finished in fourth place in the regular season standings. Selma pitcher Tom Kelleher was the co-league leader with 20 wins and teammate Frank Roland had a 2.10 ERA, the best in the Alabama–Florida League.

In 1959, Johnny Lipon became the manager for the Selma Cloverleafs in his first managerial role. Lipon subsequently spent 30 of the next 34 seasons as a minor league manager, winning 2,185 games while losing 1,987. In the other four seasons, Lipton was a major league coach with the Cleveland Indians, serving from 1968 to 1971. Lipon then became the Cleveland Indians manager after Alvin Dark was fired on July 29, 1971, and finished the season as interim manager.

A two-time major league all-star, Max Alvis played for Selma in 1959 in his first professional season. After becoming the Cleveland Indians' all-star third basemen, Alvis' baseball playing career was greatly affected after being hospitalized with spinal meningitis. After a strong start to his major league career, Alvis never had the same strength and quickness after being stricken with meningitis. Alvis batted .297 with 6 home runs and 70 RBIs while playing in 117 games for the 1959 Selma Cloverleafs at age 19.

In August 1959, two Selma pitchers both threw no hit games against the Pensacola Dons, the fifth and sixth no-hitters in franchise history. First, on August 5, 1946, Selma pitcher Robert Gordon defeated Pensacola at home in a 6–0 victory. Gordon walked 5 and had 11 strikeouts in the contest. Then, on August 20, 1959, in a game at Pensacola, Selma's Jerry Fosnow pitched the second no-hitter of the month. Fosnow walked 1 and struck out 5 in the 5–0 Selma win over the Dons.

Becoming a minor league affiliate of the Cleveland Indians, the 1959 Selma Cloverleafs won the Alabama–Florida League title, their first league championship since 1930. The Cloverleafs ended the Alabama–Florida League regular season with a 73–46 record, finishing in second place under manager Johnny Lipon. Selma ended the season 4.0 games behind the first place Montgomery Rebels. In the four-team league playoffs, Selma swept Pensacola 3 games to 0 in the first round to advance. In the Final, Selma defeated the Dothan Cardinals 4 games to 1 to win their first Alabama–Florida League championship. Selma's Keith Williams won the Alabama–Florida League batting title, hitting .341 on the season. Williams also had 156 total hits to lead the league.

Ken Landenberger began the 1960 season as the new manager of the Selma Cloverleafs. Landenberger had served as the player-manager of the Minot Mallards the previous two seasons. He did not play for Minot in 1959. A first basemen, Landenberger had played briefly for the 1952 Chicago White Sox. Landenberger left the Selma Cloverleafs team in mid-July after a medical examination revealed that he was suffering from acute leukemia. Landenberger was immediately admitted to the Cleveland Clinic where he died on July 28, 1960, the day before his 32nd birthday, after suffering from a cerebral hemorrhage and the effects of leukemia.

As defending champion in the Alabama–Florida League, Selma continued as Cleveland Indians affiliate in 1960 and made the finals in the six-team Class D level league after the death of their manager. The Cloverleafs ended the 1960 regular season with a record of 58–57 to finish in second place while playing the season under managers Ken Landenberger, Joe Morlan and Paul O'Dea. Selma finished 14½ games behind the first place Panama City Fliers in the six-team league final regular season standings. The Cloverleafs qualified for the four-team playoffs and Selma swept the Fort Walton Beach Jets in 3 games in the first round to advance. Selma the lost in the league finals as Pensacola defeated Selma 3 games to 1 to win the league championship. Selma's Jose Villar hit 23 home runs and scored 87 runs to lead the league in both categories. Cloverleafs' pitcher Peter Pekich had a league leading 17 wins for the season.

Continuing as a Cleveland Indians affiliate, the 1961 Selma Cloverleafs won their second championship in the Class D Alabama–Florida League after winning the league regular season pennants in a split season schedule. In the regular season, manager Walt Novick began the season as manager of the Selma Cloverleafs, but was moved by the Cleveland Indians to become manager of the Burlington Indians of the Carolina League during the season and replaced by Joe Morlan. The Cloverleafs, managed by Novick (47–28) and Morlan (29–15) ended the season in first place with a 76–43 record. Selma finished 5.0 games ahead of the second place Pensacola Senators in the final overall standings of the six-team Class D level league. No playoffs were held in 1961, as the six-team league played a split-season schedule and Selma won both half season pennants becoming the Alabama–Florida League champions. Cloverleafs' pitcher David Seeman had an Alabama–Florida League leading 17 wins for the season.

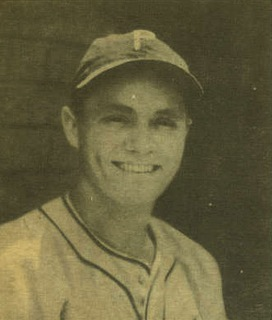
(1940) Merrill "Pinky" May, Philadelphia Phillies. May managed the Selma Cloverleafs to the Alabama–Florida League championship in 1962.

Pinky May became the Selma manager for the 1962 season. A former All-Star third basemen with the Philadelphia Phillies, May played in the major leagues for the Phillies from 1939 to 1943 before his major league playing career was interrupted by his service during World War II. May had served in the United States Navy during World War II. Following his military service, May became a long-time minor league manager from 1946 until his retirement in 1972. Pinky May's son is catcher Milt May, who had a lengthy major league playing and coaching career. As a youth, Milt May served as a bat boy for his father's minor league teams.

At age 18, Lou Piniella was signed and played his first professional season with the 1962 Selma Cloverleafs. Piniella won the 1969 AL Rookie of the year and managed the 1990 Cincinnati Reds to the 1990 World Series championship in a lengthy baseball career that spanned over 50 years. After having played one season of college basketball for the University of Tampa, Piniella was signed by the Cleveland Indians on June 9, 1962, and received $25,000 bonus. He started his professional career with Selma Cloverleafs slowly and improved after Pinky May, suggested that he worry about the fastball first and pull the ball. Piniella played in 70 games for Selma, batting .270 with 8 home runs and 44 RBIs.

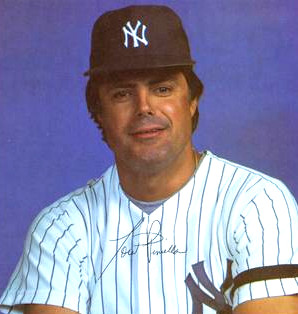
(1981) Lou Piniella, New York Yankees. Piniella played for Selma in 1962 in his first professional season at age 18.

In their final season of 1962, manager Pinky May led the defending champion Cloverleafs to an improbable second consecutive Alabama–Florida League championship in the Class D level league. Continuing play as a Cleveland Indians affiliate, Selma ended the season under .500 with a record of 55–63 and ended the regular season in fourth place in the six-team league. The Cloverleafs finished the regular season 24.0 games behind the first place Pensacola Senators playing under manager Pinky May. Selma qualified for the four-team playoffs and went on a championship run. Selma defeated the Ft. Walton Beach Jets 2 games to 0 in the first round to advance. In the Alabama–Florida League finals, Selma defeated Pensacola 3 games to 1 and won their second consecutive Alabama–Florida League championship in what became the final season for the league.

Selma was unable to defend their league championship as the Alabama-Florida League did not return to play in 1963, with the league permanently folding following the 1962 season.

=== 2002: New Selma Cloverleafs team ===
After a forty-year absence, Selma next hosted minor league baseball in 2002 when the independent Selma Cloverleafs team was formed, reviving the historic "Cloverleafs" nickname. Selma played the 2002 season as a member of the independent Southeastern League.

== The ballparks ==
All three ballparks utilized by the Selma minor league teams are on sites that were adjacent to each other. The ballpark site was an early spring training site for the Chicago Cubs.

=== Riverside Park ===
Selma first played minor league home games at a ballpark within Riverside Park in Selma. In 1901, Selma player Ed Glenn was instrumental in preparing the ballpark for its first season. Still in use today, Riverside Park has a bridge connecting to Bloch Park. Riverside Park is located at 1 Satterfield Street in Selma, Alabama.

=== Rowell Field ===
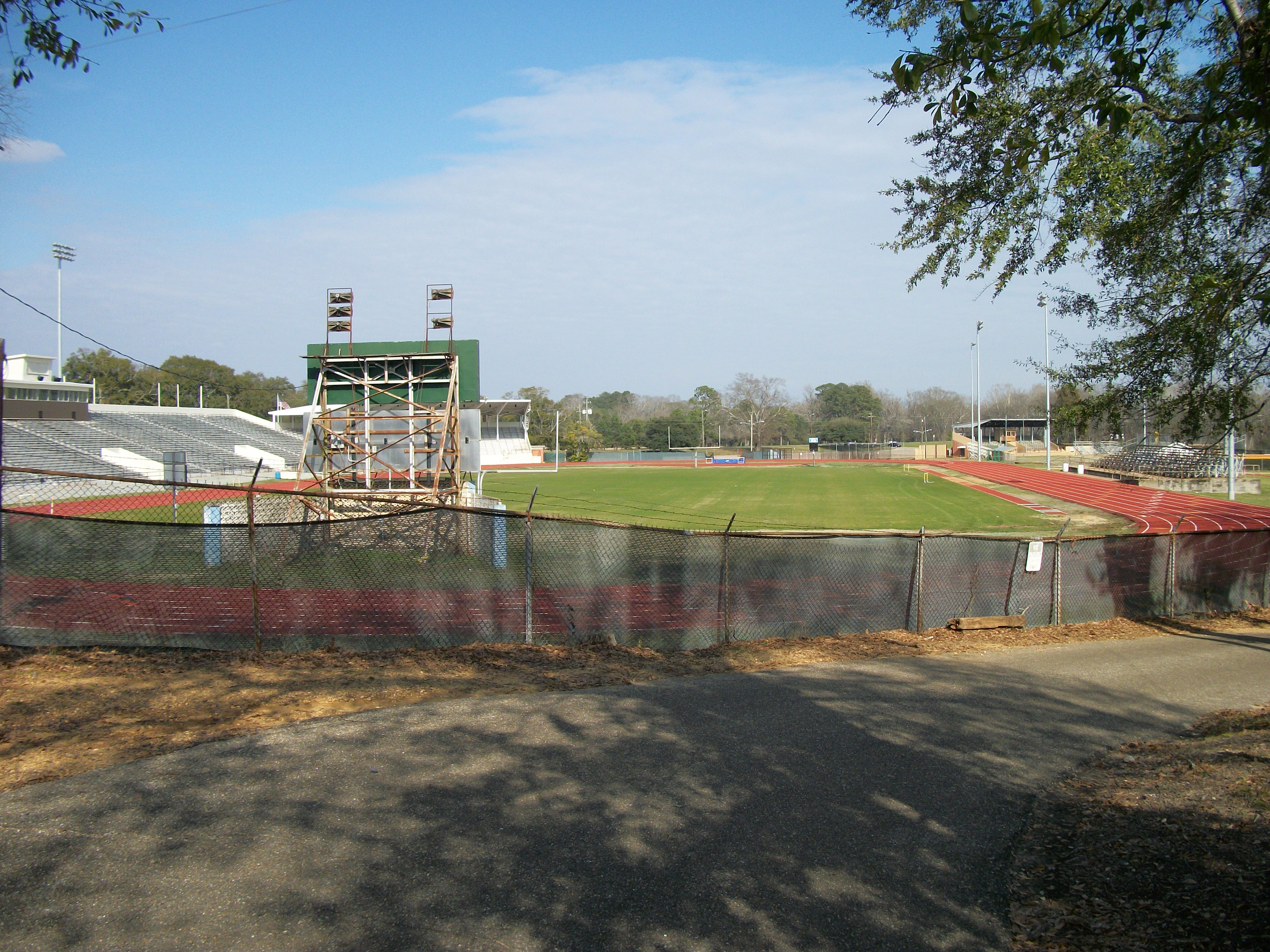
(2012) Memorial Stadium at Bloch Park. Selma, Alabama.

In their minor league seasons from 1927 to 1949, Selma hosted minor league home games at Rowell Field. When Selma applied for membership in the Southeastern League in 1927, a new ballpark was constructed to host the team. When league play began, Selma had strong home attendance in the Southeastern League games at the new Rowell Field, despite being a smaller city than the other league members. The ballpark was located at Dallas Avenue & Rowell Drive in the era. The ballpark parcel became home to both Memorial Stadium and Block Park. On April 28, 1939, Rowell Field hosted an exhibition between the Homestead Grays and Atlanta Black Crackers. Baseball Hall of Fame member Josh Gibson played for Homestead in the contest.

The Rowell Field was destroyed by fire and a new grandstand was constructed for the city by local businessman Morris Bloch, who operated a brick company in Selma at the time.

=== Block Park ===
Beginning in 1957, Selma hosted home games at Bloch Park in Selma. Bloch Park was built at the site that contained Rowell Field. "Block Park" was named for Selma businessman Morris Bloch, who owned a local hardware store and had worked to construct the ballpark. The ballpark later hosted the 2002 Selma Cloverleafs team. Still in use today, the Block Park ballpark is located at 108 West Dallas Avenue in Selma, Alabama.

== Timeline ==
Year(s)	# Yrs.	Team	Level	League	Ballpark
1901	1	Selma Christians	Class B	Southern Association	Riverside Park
1911–1912	2	Selma Centralites	Class D	Southeastern League	Riverside Park
1913	1	Selma Centralites	Class D	Cotton States League	Riverside Park
1914	1	Selma River Rats	Class D	Georgia–Alabama League	Riverside Park
1927	1	Selma Selmians	Class B	Southeastern League	Rowell Field
1928–1930	3	Selma Cloverleafs	Class B	Southeastern League	Rowell Field
1932	1	Selma Cloverleafs	Class B	Southeastern League	Rowell Field
1937–1941	5	Selma Cloverleafs	Class B	Southeastern League	Rowell Field
1946–1950	5	Selma Cloverleafs	Class B	Southeastern League	Rowell Field
1957–1962	6	Selma Cloverleafs	Class D	Alabama–Florida League	Bloch Park

== Year–by–year records ==
Year	Record	Finish	Manager	Playoffs/Notes
1901	37–78	8th	Ed Peters / Bob Pender	No Playoffs held
1911	53–51	3rd	Bill May / C.L. Howell; Frank Anderson / Ralph Savidge	No Playoffs held
1912	42–35	2nd	Link Stickney	League folded August 2
1913	49–46	3rd	Harry Spratt / Arthur Riggs	No Playoffs held
1914	60–35	1st	Arthur Riggs / Wilfred Gutierrez	No Playoffs held League champions
1927	65–88	8th	Fred Graf (18–36) / Dutch Hoffman (47–52)	No Playoffs held
1928	59–83	6th	Polly McLarry / Zinn Beck	No Playoffs held
1929	77–60	2nd	Zinn Beck	Did not qualify.
1930	94–43	1st	Zinn Beck	Won both halves/No playoff held League champions
1932	16–16	3rd	Art Phelan	League disbanded May 21
1937	78–57	2nd	Babe Ganzel	Lost in 1st round
1938	83–62	2nd	Ivy Griffin	Lost league finals
1939	68–66	4th	Billy Bancroft	Lost in 1st round
1940	72–77	4th	Wes Kingdon	Lost in 1st round
1941	80–57	2nd	Dale Alexander	Lost in 1st round
1946	60–77	7th	Frank Oceak	Did not qualify
1947	64–76	7th	Carl Fischer (9–16) / Boom-Boom Beck (55–60)	Did not qualify
1948	52–88	8th	Morrie Arnovich	Did not qualify
1949	59–76	7th	Leo Twardy (24–25) / Joseph Szuch (35–51)	Did not qualify
1950	43–87	6th	Bert Niehoff	Did not qualify
1957	55–65	6th	Buddy Kerr	Did not qualify
1958	71–49	1st	Tommy Giordano	Won league pennant Lost league finals
1959	73-46	2nd	Johnny Lipon	League champions
1960	58–57	2nd	Ken Landenberger / Joe Morlan; Paul O'Dea	Lost league finals
1961	76–43	1st	Walt Novick (47–28) / Joe Morlan (29–15)	No playoffs held League champions
1962	55–63	4th	Pinky May	League champions

== Notable alumni ==
- Don Hutson (1937) Inducted Pro Football Hall of Fame, 1963
- Dale Alexander (1941, MGR) 1932 AL Batting champion
- Max Alvis (1959) 2x MLB All-Star
- Frank Anderson (1911, MGR)
- Ivy Andrews (1927)
- Bill Andrus (1930)
- Morrie Arnovich (1948, MGR) MLB All-Star
- King Bailey (1901)
- Ernie Baker (1901)
- Billy Bancroft (1939, MGR)
- Zinn Beck (1928–1930, MGR)
- George Blackburn (1901)
- Al Blanche (1938)
- Stew Bolen (1940)
- Boom-Boom Beck (1947, MGR)
- Mel Bosser (1941)
- Stew Bowers (1940–1941)
- Larry Brown (1959)
- John Burrows (1938–1939)
- Hank Camelli (1937)
- Pete Castiglione (1946)
- Johnnie Chambers (1939–1941)
- Ed Chaplin (1927)
- Buddy Crump (1928–1928)
- Dutch Distel (1928)
- Doc Edwards (1959)
- Lee Eilbracht (1948)
- Jack Farmer (1914)
- Carl Fischer (1947, MGR)
- Harry Fisher (1947)
- Jerry Fosnow (1959)
- Fred Frank (1901)
- Babe Ganzel (1937, MGR)
- Johnny Gill (1927)
- Tommy Giordano (1958, MGR)
- Paul Gleason (1959) Actor
- Ed Glenn (1901)
- Fred Graf (1927, MGR)
- Jimmy Grant (1940)
- Ivy Griffin (1938, MGR)
- Steve Hargan (1961) MLB All-Star
- Dutch Hoffman (1927, MGR)
- Bill Holden (1927)
- Lee Howard (1947)
- Ed Johnson (1929–1930)
- Elmer Johnson (1937)
- Tommy Kane (1939)
- Buddy Kerr (1957, MGR) MLB All-Star
- Wes Kingdon (1940, MGR)
- Joe Kracher (1939)
- Hal Kurtz (1962)
- Wayne LaMaster (1928)
- Ken Landenberger (1960, MGR)
- Hillis Layne (1940)
- Sam Leslie (1929)
- Johnny Lipon (1959)
- George Loepp (1927)
- Slim Love (1913)
- Fred Lucas (1927)
- Wild Bill Luhrsen (1913)
- Polly McLarry (1922)
- Al McLean (1939)
- Pinky May (1962, MGR)
- Paddy Mayes (1913)
- Vern Morgan (1948)
- Williams Newton (1927)
- Bert Niehoff (1950, MGR)
- Paul O'Dea (1960, MGR)
- Frank Oceak (1946, MGR)
- Charlie Osgood (1948)
- Lou Palmer (1957)
- Robert Pender (1901)
- Parson Perryman (1927)
- Art Phelan (1932, MGR)
- Lou Piniella (1962) Seattle Mariners Hall of Fame
- Abner Powell (1901, Co-owner)
- Rip Radcliff (1930) MLB All-Star
- Cheo Ramos (1928)
- Grover Resinger (1940)
- Chuck Rowland (1928–1930)
- Tom Saffell (1947)
- Ben Sankey (1928–1929)
- Ralph Savidge (1911, MGR)
- Ray Scarborough (1941) MLB All-Star
- Doc Sechrist (1901)
- Duke Sims (1960)
- Carr Smith (1928)
- Harry Spratt (1913, MGR)
- Tom Stouch (1901)
- Moose Stubing (1957)
- Bob Talbot (1948)
- Al Tate (1946)
- Red Thomas (1928–1929)
- Hal Toenes (1941)
- Jim Turner (1928) MLB All-Star
- Elmer Tutwiler (1928)
- Al Vincent (1930, 1932)
- Pee-Wee Wanninger (1940)
- Floyd Weaver (1961)
- Roy Wright (1957)
- Sam Zoldak (1941)

== See also ==
- Selma Cloverleafs players
- Selma Selmians players
- Selma River Rats players
- Selma Centralites players
- Selma Christians players
