= Selma Cloverleafs =

- 2002–2003; Selma, Alabama

Minor league affiliations
- Class: Independent (2002–2003)
- League: Southeastern League (2002–2003)

Minor league titles
- League titles: none

Team data
- Name: Southeastern Cloverleafs (2003); Selma Cloverleafs (2002–2003)
- Ballpark: Bloch Park (2002–2003)

The Selma Cloverleafs were a baseball team based in Selma, Alabama. They played in the independent Southeastern League from 2002 to 2003. For most of the 2003 season, they were a road team and were known as the Southeastern Cloverleafs. They played their home games at Bloch Park.

The original Cloverleafs played in the Southeastern League and Alabama–Florida League at various times between 1928 and 1962.

== History ==
In 2002 a new version of the team was charter members of the Southeastern League of Professional Baseball. They played their home games in Selma, Alabama, at Bloch Park. The team left Selma after playing only three games in 2003 and playing the remainder of that season as the Southeastern Cloverleafs before folding at season's end.

=== 2002 ===
In April 2002, it was announced that Selma was the recipient of a team in the newly formed Southeastern League of Professional Baseball. For their inaugural season Merritt Bowden served as the manager. On May 27, 2002, the Cloverleafs played the Montgomery Wings in an exhibition game, marking the first professional baseball game to be played within the city since the original Cloverleafs folded in 1962. The season would officially begin on May 31, 2002, against the Americus Arrows on opening night, with Selma mayor James Perkins, Jr. throwing out the opening pitch. Dennis Gomez was the starting pitcher for the 'Leafs. Throwing 6 innings with 8 K's and giving up 1 earned run, picking up the win and closer Tony Macon pitched the top of the ninth inning to earn the save. Both feats were firsts for the Cloverleafs since the 1960s..The opening series drew over 2,000 fans to the stadium before the teams would embark on an 18-game roadtrip.

On June 25, 2002, the team returned after the extended roadtrip to play in front of many Cloverleaf alumni from the 1950s–1960s teams that called Selma home. The major highlight of the second half of the season occurred on July 17 when both Desmond O'Quine and Jose Colon each hit a grand slam in the seventh inning of a 17–2 rout of the rival Montgomery Wings.

The season would end after a 3–0 loss to the Pensacola Pelicans in the league tournament on August 29. The 2002 squad finished with an overall record of 29-29.

=== 2003 ===
After seeing success in the 2002 season along with the teams’ new ownership, the outlook for 2003 looked bright. The team had initial player tryouts in March followed by an invitation only try-outs in April to fill out the final team roster.

On May 13, it was announced that the team would play as a traveling team for the 2003 season after ownership was unable to pay the league a $100,000 safety net to make sure they would finish out the season on the heels of the Ozark and Americus teams folding mid-season in 2002. After the announcement, the team would play on May 29 and a final double-header on May 31 in Selma before officially becoming a traveling team. These games against the Montgomery Wings were played in Selma due to a scheduling conflict at Paterson Field.

Of note, the traveling Cloverleafs team made national press upon signing the late Ted Williams' son, John Henry Williams, on June 9. His first game came against the Pensacola Pelicans on June 12. John played in 13 games with the Cloverleafs with an average of .051.

The 2003 squad finished with an overall record of 23–44, and finished sixth in the overall standings.
