= Johnnie Chambers =

American baseball player (1911–1977)

- Pitcher
- Born: September 10, 1911; Copperhill, Tennessee, U.S.
- Died: May 11, 1977 (aged 65); Palatka, Florida, U.S.
- Batted: Left Threw: Right

MLB debut
- May 4, 1937, for the St. Louis Cardinals

Last MLB appearance
- May 14, 1937, for the St. Louis Cardinals

MLB statistics
- Win–loss record: 0–0
- Earned run average: 18.00
- Strikeouts: 1
- Stats at Baseball Reference

Teams
- St. Louis Cardinals (1937)

Johnnie Monroe Chambers (September 10, 1911 – May 11, 1977) was an American professional baseball pitcher who appeared in two games with the St. Louis Cardinals of Major League Baseball in 1937. He also played in the minor leagues from 1931 to 1945.

== Early life and career ==
Chambers was born on September 10, 1911, in Copperhill, Tennessee. Chambers attended and played baseball at Technological High School in Atlanta.

A right-handed pitcher, he began his professional baseball career in 1931 playing in spring training with the Chattanooga Lookouts of the Southern Association. and was scheduled that season to try out for the Blue Ridge League, but the league disbanded. Chambers had brief stints with the Huntington Boosters of the Middle Atlantic League and the Southern League's Atlanta Crackers and Knoxville Smokies before being signed by the St. Louis Cardinals and reporting to their Piedmont League affiliate, the Greensboro Patriots, in 1933. He finished the season with a 23-8 win-loss record in 38 games for Greensboro. He was purchased by the Houston Buffaloes in April 1934, but returned to Greensboro in May after going winless in six games. During a game against the Richmond Colts, he struck out 22 batters in 13 innings. Chambers joined the Columbus Red Birds in 1934, winning five games in 45 games pitched. The Cardinals transferred Chambers to the Sacramento Solons in the Pacific Coast League for 1936.

== Major leagues ==
After going 17-19 for Sacramento in 1936, the Cardinals purchased his contract on January 7, 1937.

Chambers made his major league debut on May 4, entering a game against the Boston Braves in the eighth inning and allowing one hit and one walk while striking out one of the five batters he faced. His second and final game came on May 14 against the Pittsburgh Pirates, where he once again entered in the eighth inning and allowed four hits and earned runs while facing eight hitters as the Pirates beat St. Louis 14–4.

He was optioned to back to Columbus on May 21 and would remain with the club for the remainder of 1937, ending the year with a 12–7 record and 3.78 ERA.

After the season ended, Cardinals general manager Branch Rickey told Sid Keener of the St. Louis Star-Times that he believed Chambers had the best chance of the club's pitching prospects to make the team in 1938.

== Return to minor leagues ==
Chambers battled for a roster spot with the Cardinals in spring training 1938 before he was sent down to Columbus on April 4. On July 19, he was obtained on waivers by the Brooklyn Dodgers for $6,000. The Dodgers optioned Chambers to the Minneapolis Millers on August 12 after the club acquired Lee Rogers from the Boston Red Sox. Chambers dealt with a sore arm for much of the 1938 season. After the minor league season ended, he was among eight players recalled to the Dodgers on September 4. He did not appear in a game before the season ended on October 2.

On January 4, 1939, he returned to the Chattanooga Lookouts as the player to be named later in an August 23 trade that sent Fred Sington from the Lookouts to the Dodgers. Named the opening day starter for Chattanooga, Chambers battled more arm trouble in 1939 and was ultimately placed on the injured list before returning on May 9. He was sold to the Selma Cloverleafs of the Southeastern League on July 24. Chambers remained with Selma for the remainder of 1939 and all of 1940, ending the 1940 season with a 9–14 record and 3.70 ERA. After beginning the 1941 season with Selma, Chambers was acquired by the Richmond Colts in the Piedmont League On May 6. However, he failed to report to Richmond and instead joined the Charleston Rebels of the South Atlantic League. He then was signed by the Southern Association's Memphis Chickasaws on August 31.

He did not play organized baseball from 1942 to 1944 due to arm issues, but returned in May 1945 when he signed with the Minneapolis Millers. Chambers split the season with the Millers and the Little Rock Travelers before ending his professional career.

== Post-playing career and death ==
Following his playing career, Chambers worked as a college and professional umpire for 18 years. He worked in the Southern League, American Association and Southeastern Conference and served as president of the Atlanta Baseball Umpires Association.

He retired from umpiring in 1971 to work as a fishing guide in Florida. While working as a boat guide for an elderly woman, Chambers drowned on May 11, 1977, in Lake George after his fishing boat was tipped by waves and he fell overboard. His body was recovered two days later.
