= Bloch Park =

Baseball stadium in Selma, Alabama, US

Coordinates: 32°24′16.38″N 87°2′25.10″W

- Interactive map of Bloch Park
- Location: Bloch Park; Selma, Alabama, 36701
- Owner: City of Selma
- Capacity: 1,500

Tenants
- Selma Cloverleafs (Alabama–Florida League) (1951–1962); Selma Cloverleafs (Southeastern League) (2002–2003); Selma Toros (Lowdnes County Amateur Baseball League) (2002–2005, 2013)

Bloch Park (/blɒk/ BLOK) is a baseball stadium in Selma, Alabama, United States. The Selma Cloverleafs of the independent Southeastern League of Professional Baseball played here before folding prior to the 2003 season. Professional baseball was also played here in the 1940s-60s by the Selma Cloverleafs of the Alabama–Florida League. Then venue was also home to the summer collegiate Selma Toros from 2002 to 2005. The team resumed play in May 2013.

The park features a small, covered grandstand that contains all bench seating and seats about 1,500. It is also used for high school and American Legion baseball.
