= Americus Arrows =

- 2002; Americus, Georgia

Minor league affiliations
- Previous classes: Independent
- League: Southeastern League (2002)

Team data
- Previous names: Americus Arrows (2002)
- Previous parks: Americus High School baseball stadium (2002)

The Americus Arrows was a short-lived baseball team based in Americus, Georgia. In 2002 they were inaugural members of the Southeastern League of Professional Baseball. They played their home games in Americus, Georgia, at the Americus High School baseball stadium.

The Arrows would begin their season on the road against the Selma Cloverleafs on May 31, 2002, on opening night. The first home game would take place later that week on June 4. However, after only about 30 games the team was disbanded due to financial problems and low attendance. The team officially folded on July 2.
