= Paterson Field =

Baseball stadium in Alabama

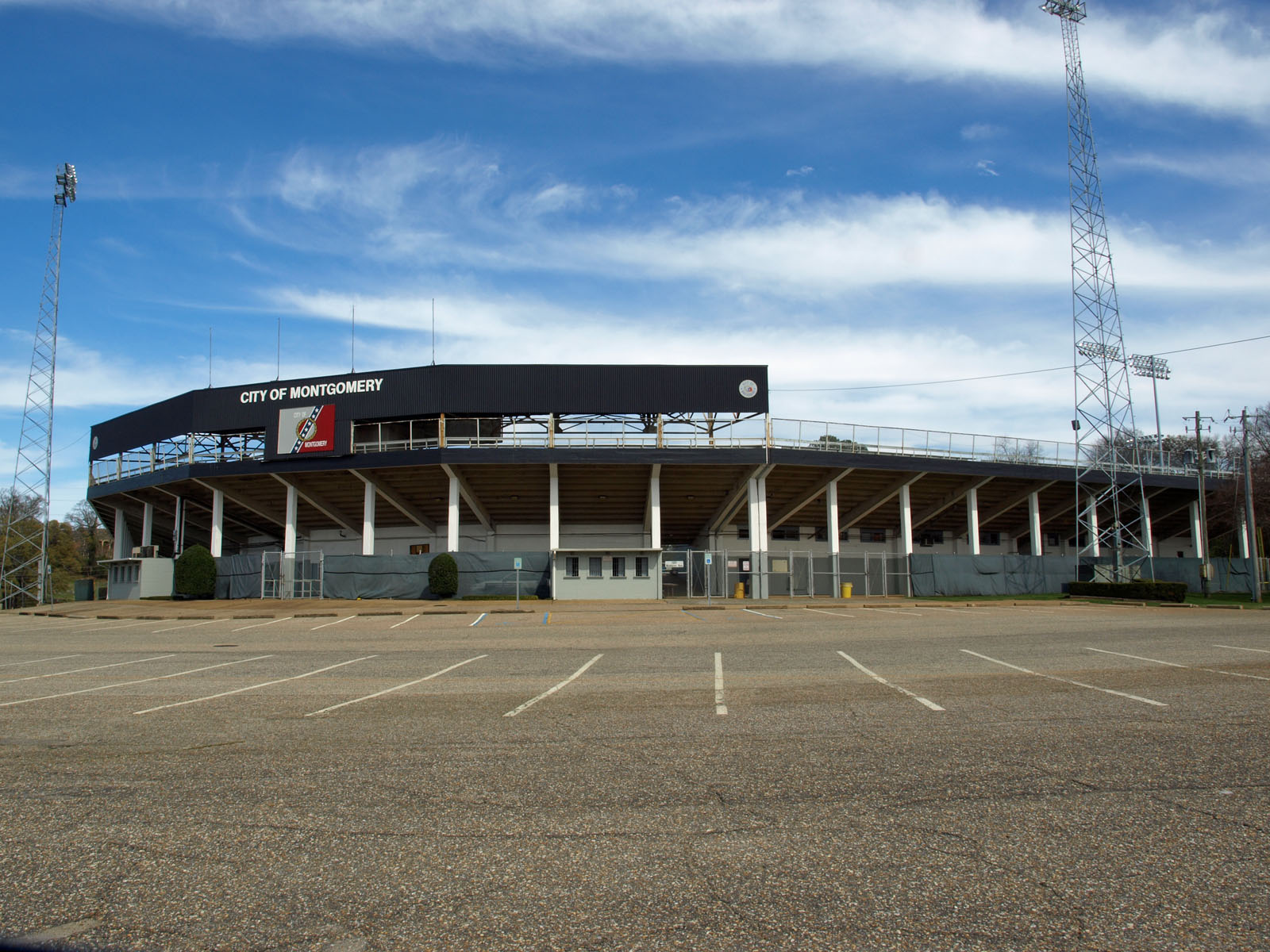
- The exterior of the stadium in February 2012
- Interactive map of Paterson Field
- Former names: Municipal Stadium
- Location: Montgomery, Alabama, U.S.
- Coordinates: 32.382127°N 86.291353°W
- Capacity: 7,000
- Surface: Grass

Construction
- Opened: 1949

Tenants
- Montgomery Rebels (1965–1980); NCAA D-II Baseball Championship (1985–2003); Montgomery Wings (2001–2003); Alabama State Hornets (?–2011)

Paterson Field is a baseball stadium in Montgomery, Alabama. The stadium, named after William Burns Paterson junior, has a maximum capacity of 7,000 people and was opened in 1949. Paterson Field has played host to, among other professional teams, the Montgomery Rebels, a AA-class minor-league team affiliated with the Detroit Tigers, and the Montgomery Wings, an independent minor-league team. The stadium is still in use today, having recently been used as the home field of Alabama State University, a Division I program that competes in the Southwestern Athletic Conference.

A majority of seating inside Paterson Field is metallic bleachers with a few rows of box seats. Roof coverings shelter the three sections of the park behind home plate. The concourse is entirely covered, and situated below the seating. The concourse also provides no views of the playing field. Its location is in the downtown Montgomery area on Madison Avenue, near its intersection with Hall Street and in close proximity to Cramton Bowl. The stadium affords no view of downtown Montgomery to the large majority of fans in the seating inside the park.

Soon after its construction, Paterson Field was the home of several Montgomery minor-league professional baseball teams. Chief among these was the 1965–80 incarnation of the Montgomery Rebels as a Detroit Tigers affiliate. During their 16 years in Montgomery, the Rebels won five Southern League championships as the Tigers developed the nucleus of a club that would win the 1984 World Series, and future MLB notables such as Jack Morris, Lou Whittaker, and Alan Trammell played under Paterson Field's lights before becoming big leaguers. The Rebels moved to Birmingham, after the 1980 Southern League season, becoming the Birmingham Barons, while Paterson Field lay relatively dormant.

Riding the wave of increased popularity in minor league baseball of any level, the independent All-American Association opened play in June 2001 with teams in six cities. With the city's population count reaching 200,000, Montgomery was a logical choice for a franchise, and the city heartily welcomed the return of professional baseball to Alabama's capital city. In 2001, the Wings were part of the All-American Association; when the league folded, the Southeastern League of Professional Baseball picked them up for the 2002 season. The Wings were brought back for a final season in 2003 before an affiliate team from the Southern League, the Montgomery Biscuits, took up residence in a new waterfront park, Dabos Park, which opened in 2004.

Paterson Field was home to the NCAA Division II Baseball Championship from 1985 to 2004, after which the event was moved to Riverwalk Stadium.
