= Pensacola Fliers =

Penscaola Fliers
- 1927–1950; Pensacola, Florida

Minor league affiliations
- Previous classes: Class B
- League: Southeastern League

Major league affiliations
- Previous teams: Washington Senators (1946); Philadelphia Phillies (1939–1940); Brooklyn Dodgers (1938)

Minor league titles
- League titles: 3 (1939, 1949, 1950)

Team data
- Previous names: Pensacola Fliers (1946–1950); Pensacola Pilots (1937–1942); Pensacola Flyers (1928–1930)
- Previous parks: Legion Field

The Pensacola Fliers were a Minor League Baseball team, based in Pensacola, Florida, United States, that operated in the Southeastern League between 1928 and 1950. They won 3 league championships, in 1939, 1949 and 1950.

The team originated as the Pensacola Flyers in 1928 and operated through 1930. After a brief hiatus, they reformed as the Pensacola Pilots which lasted through World War II. After the war they returned as the Fliers.

They had affiliation agreements with the Brooklyn Dodgers (1938), Philadelphia Phillies (1939–1940), Washington Senators (1946) and Atlanta Crackers (1949–1950).

The 1949 Fliers were recognized as one of the 100 greatest minor league teams of all time.

== Notable players ==
- Jim Rivera (1921–2017), Major League Baseball player
- Saul Rogovin, Major League Baseball pitcher; 1951 AL ERA leader

== Year-by-year records ==
Year	Record	Finish	Manager	Playoffs
1927	79-73	4th	Bill Holden	none
1928	92-54	1st	Jim Johnson	Won league pennant Lost League Finals
1929	52-85	6th	Jim Johnson / Tom Pyle	
1930	53-87	6th	Tom Pyle	none
1937	83-52	1st	Frank Kitchens	Won league pennant Lost League Finals
1938	95-53	1st	Wally Dashiell	Won league pennant Lost in 1st round
1939	87-48	1st	Wally Dashiell	League champions
1940	89-60	2nd	Wally Dashiell	Lost League Finals
1941	75-67	4th	Frank Kitchens	Lost in 1st round
1942	59-84	5th	Buster Chatham / Jake Baker	
1946	85-48	1st	Bill McGhee	Won league pennant Lost in 1st round
1947	75-68	4th	Grover Resinger (28-31) / Rudy Laskowski (47-37)	Lost in 1st round
1948	71-67	5th	Otto Denning / Wally Dashiell / Clyde McDowell	
1949	98-42	1st	Bill Herring	League champions
1950	82-52	1st	George Dozier	League champions
