= Grover Resinger =

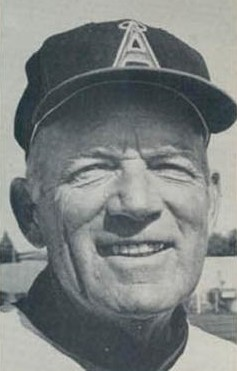
- Coach
- Born: October 20, 1915; St. Louis, Missouri, U.S.
- Died: January 11, 1986 (aged 70); St. Louis, Missouri, U.S.
- Batted: Right Threw: Right
- Stats at Baseball Reference

Teams
- Atlanta Braves (1966); Chicago White Sox (1967–1968); Detroit Tigers (1969–1970); California Angels (1975–1976)

Grover S. Resinger (October 20, 1915 – January 11, 1986) was an American coach in Major League Baseball during the 1960s and 1970s. Previously, he was a minor league third baseman and manager. A native of St. Louis, Missouri, the 5-foot-9-inch (175 cm), 160-pound (73 kg) Resinger batted and threw right-handed.

As a player, Resinger peaked at the Class A1 level (equivalent to Double-A today) with the Little Rock Travelers (1941 and 1946) of the Southern Association. He began his managerial career in 1947 as skipper (and third baseman) of the Pensacola Fliers of the Class B Southeastern League, but he was released as manager on June 14 with a 28–31 record. He remained in the league, but strictly as a third baseman, with the Meridian, Mississippi-based Meridian Peps through 1949. During his 11-year minor league playing career, Resinger batted over .300 six times.

After spending the 1950s out of organized baseball, Resinger returned to the game in 1960 as a coach with the Houston Buffaloes of the Triple-A American Association. He then joined the St. Louis Cardinals organization in 1961 as a manager in their farm system. His 1962 Billings Mustangs won the Pioneer League championship. In 1963–64 he managed the Tulsa Oilers of the Double-A Texas League (leading them to the title in 1963) and won Texas League Manager of the Year in 1964. In 1965, Resinger then became the skipper of the Jacksonville Suns of the Triple-A International League. His minor league managing record was 420 wins, 395 losses (.515).

At age 50, Resinger was promoted to his first big-league coaching assignment with the 1966 Atlanta Braves, although he resigned on August 10 upon the firing of manager Bobby Bragan. He returned to the majors as the third-base coach of the Chicago White Sox (1967–68) and Detroit Tigers (1969–70). In his final MLB assignment, he was the bench coach for Dick Williams with the California Angels in 1975–76.

In the waning days of his Detroit tenure, in September 1970, Resinger bemoaned a listless performance on the field, saying: "You know, when country-club teams like the Red Sox and Tigers get together, they should play baseball one day, polo the next, golf the next, and sail boats the fourth day."

Grover Resinger died in St. Louis at age 70.

| Preceded by Whitey Kurowski | Tulsa Oilers manager 1963–1964 | Succeeded by Vern Rapp |
| Preceded by Harry Walker | Jacksonville Suns manager 1965 | Succeeded by Solly Hemus |
| Preceded by Jo-Jo White | Atlanta Braves third-base coach 1966 | Succeeded by Jo-Jo White |
| Preceded by Tony Cuccinello | Chicago White Sox third-base coach 1967–1968 | Succeeded by Tony Cuccinello |
| Preceded by Tony Cuccinello | Detroit Tigers third-base coach 1969–1970 | Succeeded by Joe Schultz |
