= Ken Landenberger =

American baseball player (1928–1960)

- First baseman
- Born: July 29, 1928; Lyndhurst, Ohio, U.S.
- Died: July 28, 1960 (aged 31); Cleveland, Ohio, U.S.
- Batted: Left Threw: Left

MLB debut
- September 20, 1952, for the Chicago White Sox

Last MLB appearance
- September 28, 1952, for the Chicago White Sox

MLB statistics
- Batting average: .200
- Games played: 2
- Hits: 1
- Stats at Baseball Reference

Teams
- Chicago White Sox (1952)

Kenneth Henry Landenberger (July 29, 1928 – July 28, 1960) was an American professional baseball player and manager. Landenbeger played 11 seasons (1948–58) of minor league baseball and managed in the minors for three full seasons and part of a fourth. In his only Major League Baseball service, he appeared in two games as a first baseman and pinch hitter over a nine-day period for the 1952 Chicago White Sox, batted five times, and had one single — off Dick Littlefield of the St. Louis Browns in his final MLB plate appearance.

Listed as 6 ft 3 in (1.91 m) tall and 200 lb (91 kg), Landenberger batted and threw left-handed. He graduated from Charles F. Brush High School in his native Lyndhurst, Ohio, and attended Ohio University. He batted an even .300 in 1,389 games played (with 1,512 hits) during his minor league career, spent mostly in the White Sox system. He batted over .300 seven times and four times hit 25 or more home runs. But after his 1952 trial, he never returned to the Majors.

Landenberger became a minor league manager in 1957 and joined the Cleveland Indians' system the following year, managing teams at the Class C and D levels. He began the 1960 campaign as manager of the Selma Cloverleafs of the Alabama–Florida League, but he was sent home in mid-July after a medical examination revealed that he was suffering from acute leukemia. He entered the Cleveland Clinic, but died on July 28, the day before his 32nd birthday, from a cerebral hemorrhage and the effects of leukemia.
