= Ozark Patriots =

- 2002–2002; Ozark, Alabama

Minor league affiliations
- League: Southeastern League

Team data
- Previous parks: Eagle Stadium

The Ozark Patriots were based in Ozark, Alabama. In 2002 they were members of the Southeastern League of Professional Baseball. They played their home games in Ozark, Alabama, at historic Eagle Stadium, which was constructed in 1946. A few Patriot standouts were Sergio Cairo, Matt Morrison, Junior Braddy, Cortney Jenkins, Steve Crampton, and Ty Ryburn.

== History ==
Eagle Stadium is a baseball stadium where the Ozark Patriots played. They folded midway through the 2002 season. Professional baseball was also played here in the 1940s and 1950s as part of the Alabama-Florida League. The park features a small, covered grandstand that contains all bench seating and seats about 1,200. The dimensions of the field are huge here as center field is 440 feet from home plate. It is currently used for high school, American Legion, and special event baseball games.
