= Jerry Fosnow =

American baseball player (born 1940)

- Pitcher
- Born: September 21, 1940 (age 86); Deshler, Ohio, U.S.
- Batted: Right Threw: Left

MLB debut
- June 29, 1964, for the Minnesota Twins

Last MLB appearance
- July 16, 1965, for the Minnesota Twins

MLB statistics
- Win–loss record: 3–4
- Earned run average: 5.65
- Strikeouts: 44
- Stats at Baseball Reference

Teams
- Minnesota Twins (1964–1965)

Gerald Eugene Fosnow (born September 21, 1940) is an American former professional baseball player, a left-handed pitcher who appeared in parts of the 1964 and 1965 seasons for the Minnesota Twins of Major League Baseball. Fosnow batted right-handed, stood 6 feet 4 inches (1.93 m) tall and weighed 195 pounds (88 kg).

Originally signed by the Cleveland Indians, Fosnow pitched a no-hit game on August 20, 1959, his first professional season, while pitching for the Selma Cloverleafs in the Class D Alabama–Florida League. He was eventually acquired by the Twins' farm system and was recalled by Minnesota from the Triple-A Atlanta Crackers in the middle of the 1964 season. In seven appearances and 10 2/3 innings pitched, all in relief, Fosnow sported a 0–1 win–loss record and a poor 10.64 earned run average.

However, he earned a job in the 1965 Twins' bullpen coming out of spring training and won his first Major League game on Opening Day, April 12, pitching two scoreless innings against the New York Yankees in relief of Jim Kaat. The Yankees were the defending American League champions, but the 1965 Twins would go on to win the AL pennant, the first for the franchise since its relocation to the Twin Cities in 1961. Fosnow would appear in 29 games that season, and compile a 3–3 record with a 4.44 earned average in 46 2/3 innings. But he was sent to the Triple-A Denver Bears after his last MLB game on July 16, 1965, and did not appear on the Twins' World Series roster. He left baseball after the 1967 season.
