= Roy Ellam (baseball) =

American baseball player (1886–1948)

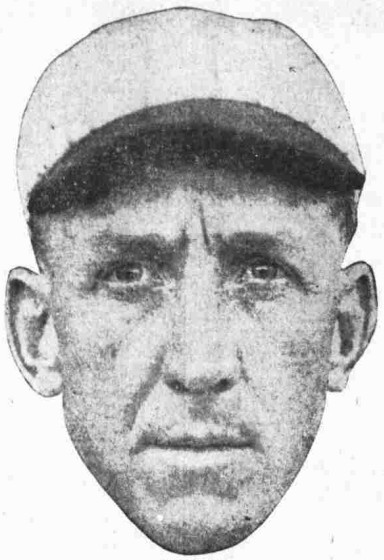
- Shortstop
- Born: February 8, 1886; Conshohocken, Pennsylvania, U.S.
- Died: October 28, 1948 (aged 62); Conshohocken, Pennsylvania, U.S.
- Batted: Right Threw: Right

MLB debut
- September 18, 1909, for the Cincinnati Reds

Last MLB appearance
- August 29, 1918, for the Pittsburgh Pirates

MLB statistics
- Batting average: .143
- Home runs: 1
- Runs batted in: 6
- Stats at Baseball Reference

Teams
- Cincinnati Reds (1909); Pittsburgh Pirates (1918)

Roy Ellam (February 8, 1886 – October 28, 1948), nicknamed "Slippery", was an American professional baseball player. He was a shortstop for parts of two seasons (1909, 1918) with the Cincinnati Reds and Pittsburgh Pirates. For his career, he compiled a .143 batting average, with one home run and six runs batted in.

He was born in Conshohocken, Pennsylvania.

He was killed on October 28, 1948 in Conshohocken when he was hit by a 150 lb (68 kg) weight which fell from a fire escape.
