= Tom Long (outfielder) =

American baseball player (1890–1972)

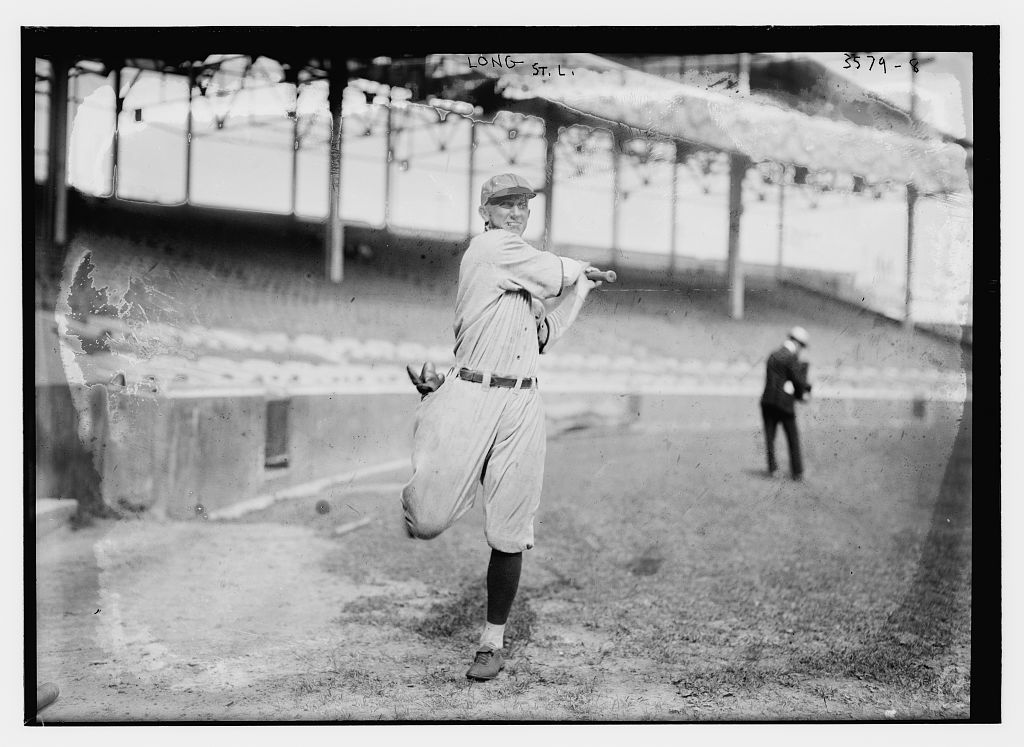
- Tom Long in 1915
- Outfielder
- Born: June 1, 1890; Coffeeville, Alabama, U.S.
- Died: June 23, 1972 (aged 82); Mobile, Alabama, U.S.
- Batted: Right Threw: Right

MLB debut
- September 11, 1911, for the Washington Senators

Last MLB appearance
- September 30, 1917, for the St. Louis Cardinals

MLB statistics
- Batting average: .269
- Home runs: 6
- Runs batted in: 140
- Stats at Baseball Reference

Teams
- Washington Senators (1911–1912); St. Louis Cardinals (1915–1917)

Career highlights and awards
- Led NL in triples in 1915

Thomas Augustus Long (June 1, 1890 – June 23, 1972), was a professional baseball outfielder in the Major Leagues from 1911–1917. He played for the Washington Senators and St. Louis Cardinals.

In 418 games over five seasons, Long posted a .269 batting average (401-for-1489) with 148 runs, 6 home runs and 140 RBI. He finished his career with a .928 fielding percentage at all three outfield positions. In 1915, he led the National League in triples with 25.

== See also ==
- List of Major League Baseball annual triples leaders
