= Anniston Rams =

- 1938–1950; (1938–1942, 1946–1950); Anniston, Alabama

Minor league affiliations
- Class: Class B (1938–1950)
- League: Southeastern League (1938–1950)

Major league affiliations
- Team: Pittsburgh Pirates (1946); Brooklyn Dodgers (1940); Chicago White Sox (1938–1939)

Minor league titles
- League titles (1): 1946

Team data
- Name: Anniston Rams (1938–1950)
- Ballpark: Johnston Field (1938–1950)

The Anniston Rams were a minor league baseball team based in Anniston, Alabama that operated in the Southeastern League from 1938–1942 and again from 1946–1950. They had affiliation deals with the Chicago White Sox (1938–39), Brooklyn Dodgers (1940) and Pittsburgh Pirates (1946).

Anniston had several minor-league teams between 1904 and the Rams' first season in 1938, but the Rams were Anniston's longest-running team.

The Rams' nickname related to the city's foundational iron foundry industries and the wooden "rammer" tools workers used in making the moulds.

The Rams' final season, 1950, ended early when poor finances caused the franchise to be returned to the Southeastern League, which operated it as an "orphan" team for two weeks and forced it to play all of its games on the road. The league finally folded the team on July 25.
