= Tom Pyle =

English footballer

Personal information
- Full name: Tom Pyle
- Date of birth: 29 November 1875
- Place of birth: Lincoln, Lincolnshire, England
- Date of death: 20 December 1958 (aged 83)
- Place of death: Lincoln, Lincolnshire
- Positions: Inside left; outside left

Senior career*
Years	Team	Apps	(Gls)
–	Princess (Lincoln)		
1894–1900	Lincoln City	27	(3)
–	Adelaide (Lincoln)		
- * Club domestic league appearances and goals

Tom Pyle (29 November 1875 – 20 December 1958) was an English footballer who played in the Football League for Lincoln City as an inside or outside left.

Pyle appeared infrequently for Lincoln's first team, making only 30 appearances in senior competition over six seasons. In March 1899 – four years after his Football League debut – the Sheffield Independent described him as "a local youth who had been introduced at outside left", who "played a very fine game, and was on more than one occasion the recipient of a splendid ovation at the hands of the spectators" as Lincoln beat Newton Heath 2–0. Pyle opened the scoring in Lincoln's next game, a 2–2 draw with Small Heath, and his third and last senior goal came on the opening day of the 1899–1900 Football League season, in a 3–0 defeat of Middlesbrough. He also played local football in the Lincoln area.

He later worked as a bricklayer in Lincoln, where he died in 1958.
