= Ivy Griffin =

American baseball player (1896-1957)

- First baseman
- Born: November 16, 1896; Thomasville, Alabama, U.S.
- Died: August 25, 1957 (aged 60); Gainesville, Georgia, U.S.
- Batted: Left Threw: Right

MLB debut
- September 9, 1919, for the Philadelphia Athletics

Last MLB appearance
- August 28, 1921, for the Philadelphia Athletics

MLB statistics
- Batting average: .257
- Home runs: 0
- RBI: 39
- Stats at Baseball Reference

Teams
- Philadelphia Athletics (1919–1921)

Ivy Moore Griffin (November 16, 1896 – August 25, 1957) was an American first baseman in Major League Baseball. He played from 1919 to 1921 for the Philadelphia Athletics.

Griffin was a manager in the minor leagues from 1935 to 1955, winning four league championships. While Griffin managed a Class D team in Eau Claire, Wisconsin, he signed future all-star player Andy Pafko. Pafko, who had never played baseball in high school, was signed while working on his father's nearby farm. Griffin died in an automobile accident in Gainesville, Georgia.
