= St. Augustine Saints =

- 1926–1952; (1926–1927, 1936–1941, 1946–1950, 1952); St. Augustine, Florida

Minor league affiliations
- Previous classes: Class D (1936–1941); Class B (1926–1927)
- League: Florida State League (1936–1952)
- Previous leagues: Southeastern League (1926–1927)

Major league affiliations
- Previous teams: Chicago Cubs (1948–1949)

Minor league titles
- League titles: 2 (1936, 1949)

Team data
- Previous names: St. Augustine Saints (1936–1952); Waycross Saints (1927); St. Augustine Saints (1926–1927)
- Previous parks: Francis Field

St. Augustine Saints were a professional minor league baseball team that played primarily in the Florida State League, winning two league titles. The team did play however for two seasons in the Southeastern League. During World War II, Saints' pitching phenom, Forrest "Lefty" Brewer was one of 5 men, who played minor-league or semipro ball, to die while taking place in the D-Day Invasion. Brewer had pitched a no-hitter for the Saints in the 1938 season.

During the 1927 season, the team was briefly known as the Waycross Saints.

The Saints folded on June 1, 1952. A newspaper report cited "poor attendance and a lack of funds." The club had a 10–37 record at the time.
