= Montgomery Wings =

- 2001–2003; Montgomery, Alabama

Minor league affiliations
- League: Southeastern League (2002-2003)
- Previous leagues: All-American Association (2001)

Team data
- Previous parks: Paterson Field

The Montgomery Wings were a professional baseball team that represented Montgomery, Alabama in the independent All-American Association and Southeastern League from 2001 to 2003.
