= Babe Ganzel =

American baseball player (1901–1978)

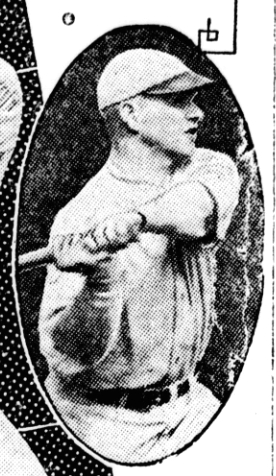
- Outfielder
- Born: May 22, 1901; Malden, Massachusetts, U.S.
- Died: February 6, 1978 (aged 76); Jacksonville, Florida, U.S.
- Batted: Left Threw: Right

MLB debut
- September 19, 1927, for the Washington Senators

Last MLB appearance
- May 10, 1928, for the Washington Senators

MLB statistics
- Batting average: .311
- Home runs: 1
- Runs batted in: 17
- Stats at Baseball Reference

Teams
- Washington Senators (1927–1928)

Foster Pirie "Babe" Ganzel (May 22, 1901 – February 6, 1978) was an American outfielder who played baseball for the Washington Senators from 1927 to 1928. He batted left handed and threw right-handed.

A native of Malden, Massachusetts, Ganzel came from a family of baseball men. His father, Charlie, was a catcher who played with the Whitecaps, Quakers, Wolverines and Beaneaters during 14 seasons, and his uncle John was a first baseman for the Pirates, Cubs, Giants, Highlanders and Reds and also managed the Reds and the Tip-Tops. Two brothers and two uncles also played in the minor leagues.

In a two-season career, Ganzel posted a .311 batting average with one home run and 17 RBI in 23 games played.

Following his majors career, Ganzel played in the high minors for nine years. Then he turned to managing and directing the Selma, St. Paul and Jacksonville Triple-A teams.

Ganzel died in Jacksonville, Florida, at the age of 76.

== See also ==
- List of second-generation Major League Baseball players
