= Dutch Hoffman =

American baseball player (1904–1962)

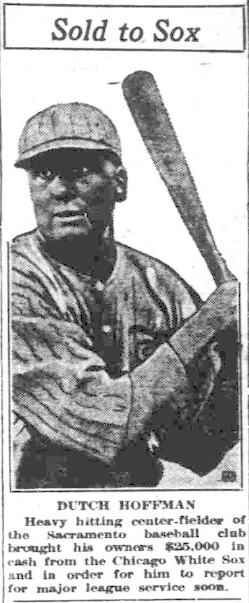
- Outfielder
- Born: January 28, 1904; Freeburg, Illinois, U.S.
- Died: December 6, 1962 (aged 58); Belleville, Illinois, U.S.
- Batted: Right Threw: Right

MLB debut
- April 23, 1929, for the Chicago White Sox

Last MLB appearance
- October 6, 1929, for the Chicago White Sox

MLB statistics
- Batting average: .258
- Home runs: 3
- Runs batted in: 37
- Stats at Baseball Reference

Teams
- Chicago White Sox (1929)

Clarence Casper "Dutch" Hoffman (January 28, 1904 – December 6, 1962) was an American outfielder in Major League Baseball. He played for the Chicago White Sox in 1929. Hoffman served as the President of the Mississippi-Ohio Valley League and the Midwest League from 1949 to 1962, overseeing the growth and reorganization of the leagues.
