= Fred Graf =

American baseball player (1889-1979)

- Third baseman
- Born: August 25, 1889; Canton, Ohio, U.S.
- Died: October 4, 1979 (aged 90); Chattanooga, Tennessee, U.S.
- Batted: Right Threw: Right

MLB debut
- May 14, 1913, for the St. Louis Browns

Last MLB appearance
- September 18, 1913, for the St. Louis Browns

MLB statistics
- Batting average: .400
- Home runs: 0
- Runs batted in: 2
- Stats at Baseball Reference

Teams
- St. Louis Browns (1913)

Frederick Gottleib Graf (August 25, 1889 – October 4, 1979) was an American Major League Baseball third baseman who played with the St. Louis Browns in 1913. In nine plate appearances he batted .400/.625/.600.

He was a minor league manager in the Southeastern League in 1926 and 1927. He was Jewish.
