= Southeastern League =

American baseball league(s)

- Classification: Independent (1897); Class D (1910–1912); Class B (1926–1930, 1932, 1937–1942, 1946–1950); Independent (2002–2003)
- Sport: Minor League Baseball
- First season: 1897
- Folded: 2003
- President: Judge J. G. Bloodworth (1897); J. H. O'Neill (1910–1911); H. W. Roberts (1912); Cliff Green (1926-1930); Roy Williams (1932); Maurice I. Bloch (1936); Stuart X. Stephenson (1937–1941); Pat Moulton (1942); Stuart X. Stephenson (1946–1950); James Gamble (2002–2003)
- No. of teams: 28
- Country: United States of America
- Most titles: 4 Pensacola; Mobile

The Southeastern League was the name of four separate baseball leagues in minor league baseball which operated in the Southeastern and South Central United States in numerous seasons between 1897 and 2003. Two of these leagues were associated with organized baseball; the third and most recent incarnation was an independent league that operated for two seasons in 2002–03.

== History ==
=== Class D league (1910–12) ===
After playing a season in 1897, the Southeastern League reformed and lasted for three years, from 1910 through 1912. At Class D, it was considered on the lowest rung of the minor league ladder, and had six clubs located in the American states of Alabama, Georgia, North Carolina and Tennessee. Stung by the midseason collapse of two of its six franchises, this league disbanded on August 2, 1912.

=== Class B league (1926–50) ===
In 1926 a new, Class B Southeastern League took the field, with six teams — representing Montgomery, Alabama; Jacksonville and St. Augustine, Florida; and Albany, Columbus and Savannah, Georgia. Although this league would be periodically shut down by the Great Depression and World War II, it continued as a Class B circuit, four levels below Major League Baseball, through 1950.

Its lineup of teams in its final season included the champion Pensacola Fliers, Meridian Millers, Montgomery Rebels, Jackson Senators, Vicksburg Billies, Selma Cloverleafs, Gadsden Pilots and Anniston Rams. Both Gadsden and Anniston withdrew from the league before the end of the season.

=== Independent league (2002–03) ===
The most recent version of the Southeastern League was an independent circuit, with member teams were not affiliated with any Major League Baseball team.

The league began play in 2002 after the demise of the All-American Association. For its inaugural season, it placed teams in Montgomery, Ozark, and Selma, Alabama, along with Pensacola, Florida, Americus, Georgia, and Baton Rouge, Louisiana. The Ozark Patriots and Americus Arrows franchises folded at mid-season. The Pensacola Pelicans won the inaugural league championship.

After completing the season, the league added two franchises for 2003. The league had high hopes for its new team in Macon, Georgia, and Houma, Louisiana, along with the already successful clubs in Montgomery and Pensacola. However, after just two games the Selma Cloverleafs folded, forcing the league to operate the club as a road team for the duration of the season under the name "Southeastern Cloverleafs." The Macon Peaches also fared a lot worse than expected. Still, the league completed the year, with Pensacola compiling the league's best mark at 42-23 and Baton Rouge defeating Pensacola, 3 games to 1, in the league championship series.

Ultimately, the league could not survive the arrival of affiliated baseball to Montgomery. The Orlando Rays of the Southern League, who had played at Walt Disney World for four years, became the Montgomery Biscuits and effectively drove the Wings out of town. In addition, the Springfield/Ozark Mountain Ducks of the Central Baseball League moved to Pensacola and assumed the Pelicans name. As a result, the league folded prior to the 2004 season.

== Cities represented ==
=== Member teams (2003) ===
- Baton Rouge, LA: Baton Rouge Riverbats
- Houma, LA: Houma Hawks
- Macon, GA: Macon Peaches
- Montgomery, AL: Montgomery Wings
- Pensacola, FL:Pensacola Pelicans
- Selma, AL: Selma/Southeastern Cloverleafs

=== 1910-1950 ===
- Albany, GA: Albany Nuts (1926-1928)
- Anniston, AL: Anniston Models (1911-1912); Anniston Rams (1938-1942, 1946-1950)
- Asheville, NC: Asheville Moonshiners (1910)
- Bessemer, AL: Bessemer Pipemakers (1912)
- Columbus, GA: Columbus Foxes (1926-1930, 1932)
- Decatur, AL: Decatur Twins (1911)
- Gadsden, AL: Gadsden Steel Makers (1910-1912); Gadsden Pilots (1938-1941, 1946-1948); Gadsden Chiefs (1949); Gadsden Pilots (1950)
- Huntsville, AL: Huntsville Westerns (1911); Huntsville Mountaineers (1912)
- Jackson, MS: Jackson Senators (1932, 1937-1942, 1946-1950)
- Jacksonville, FL: Jacksonville Tars (1926-1930)
- Johnson City, TN: Johnson City Soldiers (1910)
- Knoxville, TN: Knoxville Appalachians (1910)
- Macon, GA: Macon Peaches (1932)
- Meridian, MS: Meridian Scrappers (1937-1939); Meridian Bears (1940); Meridian Eagles (1941-1942); Meridian Peps (1946-1948); Meridian Millers (1949-1950)
- Mobile, AL: Mobile Red Warriors (1932; Mobile Shippers 1937-1942)
- Montgomery, AL: Montgomery Lions (1926-1930); Montgomery Capitals (1932); Montgomery Bombers (1937-1938); Montgomery Rebels (1939-1942, 1946-1950)
- Morristown, TN: Morristown Jobbers (1910)
- Pensacola, FL: Pensacola Pilots (1927); Pensacola Fliers (1928-1930); Pensacola Pilots (1937-1942); Pensacola Fliers (1946-1950)
- Rome, GA: Rome Romans (1910); Rome Hillies (1911); Rome Romans (1912)
- Savannah, GA: Savannah Indians (1926-1928)
- St. Augustine, FL: St. Augustine Saints (1926-1927)
- Selma, AL: Selma Centralites (1911-1912); Selma Selmians (1927); Selma Cloverleafs (1928-1930, 1932, 1937-1941, 1946-1950)
- Talladega, AL: Talladega Highlanders (1912)
- Tampa, FL: Tampa Krewes (1928); Tampa Smokers (1929-1930)
- Vicksburg, MS: Vicksburg Billies (1946-1949); Vicksburg Hill Billies (1950)
- Waycross, GA: Waycross Saints (1927)

== Standings & statistics ==
=== Year 1897 ===
1897 Southeastern League

Team standings	W	L	PCT	GB	Managers
Knoxville Indians	22	10	.688	-	Frank Moffett
Atlanta Crackers	19	10	.655	1½	Jack Sheridan
Chattanooga Blues	7	26	.212	15½	A.M. Gifford
Columbus Babies	3	6	.333	NA	James Smith Jr.
Asheville Moonshiners	11	10	.524	NA	John Jobe

Columbus disbanded April 29; Asheville entered the league May 6

=== Years 1910-1912 ===
1910 Southeastern League

Team standings	W	L	PCT	GB	Managers
Knoxville Appalachians	50	30	.625	-	Frank Moffett
Morristown Jobbers	46	37	.554	5½	E. Fisher / E. Sherrill
Johnson City Soldiers	45	39	.536	7	Nat Taylor / Ed Garner
Asheville Moonshiners	44	41	.518	8½	David Gaston
Rome Romans	43	41	.512	9	Joe Patton / C.G. Milford
Gadsden Steel Makers	21	61	.256	30	Paul Stevenson / J. Foreman; Baldorf

Player statistics
Player	Team	Stat	Tot
Roy Thrasher	Asheville/Rome	BA	.324
E.H. Graham	Morristown	Runs	55
Roy Thrasher	Asheville/Rome	Hits	96
Sephia Silvers	Knoxville	HR	3
Roy Thrasher	Asheville/Rome	SB	

1911 Southeastern League

Team standings	W	L	PCT	GB	Managers
Anniston Models	68	39	.636	-	Walter Ford / Thomas Fisher
Gadsden Steel Makers	62	42	.596	4½	King Bailey
Selma Centralites	53	51	.510	13½	Bill May / C.L. Howell; Frank Anderson / Ralph Savidge
Rome Hillies	47	57	.452	19½	Carlton Beusse / Don Burt
Huntsville Westerns	46	56	.451	19½	V. Campbell / Bill Watkins; Newt Horn / Wild Bill Evans / Arthur Riggs
Decatur Twins	37	68	.352	30	Don Burt / Gordon Hickman; Con Harlow

Player statistics
Player	Team	Stat	Tot	Player	Team	Stat	Tot
Tommy Long	Gadsden	BA	.364	Clarence Smith	Anniston	W	24
Tommy Long	Gadsden	Runs	97	Clarence Smith	Anniston	SO	248
Tommy Long	Gadsden	Hits	149	Sam Nelson	Anniston	PCT	.750 12-4
Tommy Long	Gadsden	HR	18				

1912 Southeastern League

Team standings	W	L	PCT	GB	Managers
Gadsden Steel Makers	43	33	.566	-	Johnny Siegle
Selma Centralites	42	35	.545	1½	Lindsay Stickney
Anniston Models	41	35	.539	2	Thomas Fisher
Rome Romans	37	36	.507	4½	Harry Matthews
Huntsville Mountaineers / Talladega Highlanders	33	44	.429	10.5	Arthur Riggs
Bessemer Pipemakers	29	42	.408	11½	Gordon Hickman

Huntsville (24-29) moved to Talladega July 9; Bessemer disbanded July 14; Anniston disbanded July 19
Second half started July 22. The league disbanded August 2 with the following official second half standings: Gadsden (7-4), Talladega (5-5), Selma (5-6), and Rome (5-7).

Player statistics
Player	Team	Stat	Tot
Earl Hanna	Selma	BA	.345
Earl Hanna	Selma	Runs	62
Earl Hanna	Selma	Hits	115
John Cochran	Bessemer / Anniston	HR	12

=== Years 1926-1930, 1932 ===
1926 Southeastern League

Team standings	W	L	PCT	GB	Managers
Columbus Foxes	72	49	.595	-	Hardin Herndon
Montgomery Lions	70	49	.588	½	Joe Brennan / Charles Leonard
Jacksonville Tars	64	60	.516	9½	Bob Fisher / [Red Smith
Albany Nuts	53	64	.453	12	George Stinson / Sumpter Clarke
St. Augustine Saints	55	70	.440	19	Fred Graf / Bob Folmar
Savannah Indians	49	71	.408	22½	Bill Robertsor / William Holland; Army Magness

Playoff: Columbus 4 games, Montgomery 1

Player statistics
Player	Team	Stat	Tot	Player	Team	Stat	Tot
John Kloza	Montgomery	BA	.380	Lawton McWhirter	Montgomery	W	19
Burney Acton	Montgomery	Runs	103	Paul Doss	Columbus	SO	110
Henry Parrish	Columbus	Hits	174	Lawton McWhirter	Montgomery	PCT	.792 19-5
Henry Parrish	Columbus	HR	28				

1927 Southeastern League

Team standings	W	L	PCT	GB	Managers
Jacksonville Tars	90	63	.588	-	Tommy McMillan
Montgomery Lions	86	67	.562	4	Charles Leonard / Bill Pierre
Columbus Foxes	80	71	.530	9	Hardin Herndon
Pensacola Pilots	79	73	.520	10½	Bill Holden / Jim Johnston
Savannah Indians	72	79	.477	17	Joe Brennan / Harry Snyder
Albany Nuts	69	81	.460	19½	Sumpter Clarke
St. Augustine Saints / Waycross Saints	66	85	.437	23	Bob Folmar / Roy Ellam
Selma Selmians	65	88	.425	25	Fred Graf / Tex Hoffman

St. Augustine (42-53) moved to Waycross July 25

Player statistics
Player	Team	Stat	Tot	Player	Team	Stat	Tot
John Kloza	Albany	BA	.404	Ben Cantwell	Jacksonville	W	25
Henry Parrish	Columbus	Runs	114	Bill Clowers	Pensacola	SO	172
Mel Simons	Montgomery	Hits	198	Ben Cantwell	Jacksonville	PCT	.833 25-4
Henry Parrish	Columbus	HR	34				

1928 Southeastern League

Team Standings	W	L	PCT	GB	Managers
Pensacola Fliers	92	54	.630	-	Jim Johnston
Montgomery Lions	91	57	.615	2	Bill Pierre
Tampa Krewes	72	76	.486	21	Roy Ellam
Jacksonville Tars	71	78	.477	22½	Art Bourg / Hardin Herndon
Columbus Foxes	61	84	.421	30½	Hardin Herndon / Bill White
Selma Cloverleafs	59	83	.415	31	Polly McLarry / Zinn Beck
Albany Nuts	62	60	.508	NA	Joe Schepner / Tommy McMillan
Savannah Indians	49	65	.430	NA	Ray Schmandt

Albany and Savannah disbanded August 12

Playoff: Montgomery 4 games, Pensacola 2

Player statistics
Player	Team	Stat	Tot	Player	Team	Stat	Tot
Moose Clabaugh	Jacksonville	BA	.366	Floyd Van Pelt	Montgomery	W	26
Tom Pyle	Pensacola	Runs	110	Floyd Van Pelt	Montgomery	SO	183
Tom Pyle	Pensacola	Hits	197	Ralph Stewart	Montgomery	ERA	2.24
Parker Perry	Albany / Selma	RBI	118	Floyd Van Pelt	Montgomery	PCT	.703 26-11
Sam Stuart	Columbus	HR	17				

1929 Southeastern League

Team standings	W	L	PCT	GB	Managers
Tampa Smokers	79	56	.585	-	Pop Kitchens
Selma Cloverleafs	77	60	.562	3	Zinn Beck
Montgomery Lions	73	64	.533	7	Roy Ellam
Jacksonville Tars	68	68	.500	9½	Tommy McMillan / Rube Marquard
Columbus Foxes	58	74	.439	19.5	Frank Kohlbecker / Bill White
Pensacola Fliers	52	85	.380	28	Jim Johnston / Tom Pyle

Playoff: Montgomery 4 games, Tampa 3

Player statistics
Player	Team	Stat	Tot	Player	Team	Stat	Tot
Dick Tangeman	Pensacola	BA	.373	Roy Appleton	Tampa	W	26
Art Bourg	Jacksonville	Runs	108	Ray Phelps	Jacksonville	SO	136
Tom Pyle	Pensacola	Hits	190	Edward Chambers	Montgomery / Pensacola	ERA	2.16
Parker Perry	Selma	RBI	107	Roy Appleton	Tampa	PCT	.735 25-9
Parker Perry	Selma	HR	12				

1930 Southeastern League

Team standings	W	L	PCT	GB	Managers
Selma Cloverleafs	94	43	.686	-	Zinn Beck
Tampa Smokers	73	65	.529	21½	Pop Kitchens
Jacksonville Tars	69	66	.511	24	Rube Marquard
Montgomery Lions	61	73	.455	31½	Roy Ellam
Columbus Foxes	63	79	.444	34½	Bill White / Bobby Lennox
Pensacola Pilots	53	87	.379	42½	Tom Pyle / Ray Kennedy

Player statistics
Player	Team	Stat	Tot	Player	Team	Stat	Tot
Rip Radcliff	Selma	BA	.369	Henry Brewer	Selma	W	25
Ralph Dunbar	Columbus	Runs	104	Thornton Lee	Tampa	SO	145
Rip Radcliff	Selma	Hits	199	Roy Appleton	Tampa	ERA	2.22
Rip Radcliff	Selma	RBI	116	Leo Mackey	Selma	PCT	.875 14-2
Rip Radcliff	Selma	HR	15				

1932 Southeastern League

Team standings	W	L	PCT	GB	Managers
Mobile Red Warriors	19	13	.594	-	Clay Hopper
Columbus Foxes	19	14	.576	½	Jack Sheehan
Selma Cloverleafs	16	16	.500	3	Art Phelan
Macon Peaches	15	18	.455	4½	Sheery Smith
Jackson Senators	15	18	.455	4½	Hank DeBerry
Montgomery Capitals	13	18	.419	5½	Jim Johnston

The league folded May 21

Player statistics
Player	Team	Stat	Tot	Player	Team	Stat	Tot
Robert Schleischer	Selma	BA	.398	Albert Fisher	Mobile	W	6
Jack Sheehan; Clarence Beasley	Columbus; Columbus	Runs	37	Jackie Reid	Jackson	SO	47
Buster Mills	Mobile	Hits	47	Albert Fisher	Mobile	ERA	2.14
J.W. McKee	Columbus	RBI	39				
Fred Sington	Columbus	HR	6				
