= Polly McLarry =

American baseball player (1891–1971)

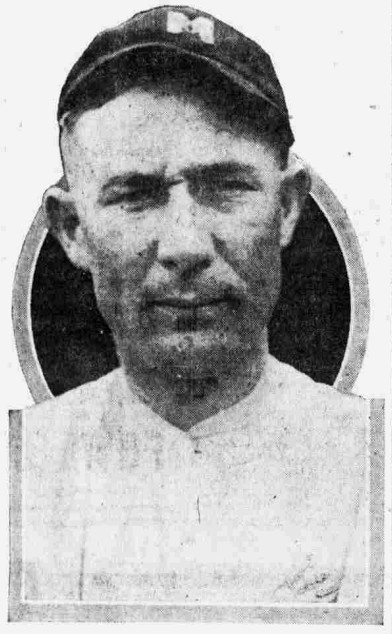
- Second baseman / First baseman
- Born: March 25, 1891; Leonard, Texas, U.S.
- Died: November 4, 1971 (aged 80); Bonham, Texas, U.S.
- Batted: Left Threw: Right

MLB debut
- September 2, 1912, for the Chicago White Sox

Last MLB appearance
- September 24, 1915, for the Chicago Cubs

MLB statistics
- Batting average: .194
- Home runs: 1
- Runs batted in: 12
- Stats at Baseball Reference

Teams
- Chicago White Sox (1912); Chicago Cubs (1915)

Howard Zell "Polly" McLarry (March 25, 1891 – November 4, 1971) was an American professional baseball player who played infield in the Major Leagues from 1912 to 1915. He played for the Chicago Cubs and Chicago White Sox. During the 1912 season, McLarry played in two games with the Chicago White Sox, only saw one at bat per game, and failed to record a hit or reach base safely. McLarry played in 68 games for the Chicago Cubs during 1915 as a first and second baseman.
